= Rachel Grady =

American documentary filmmaker

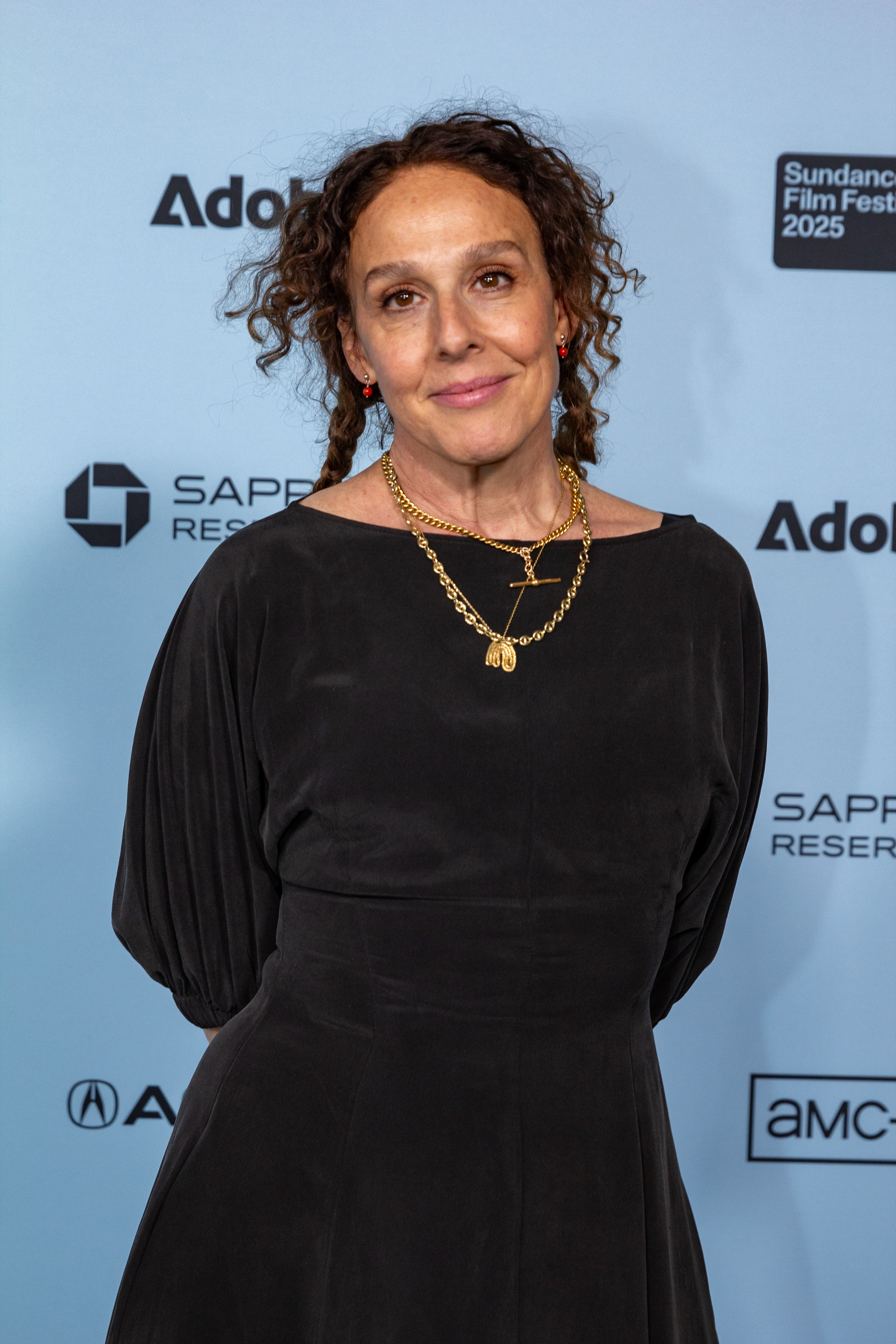
- Grady at the 2025 Sundance Film Festival
- Born: United States
- Occupation: Documentary filmmaker

Rachel Grady is an American documentary filmmaker.

She co-directed Jesus Camp (Academy Award nominee), The Boys of Baraka (Emmy nominee), 12th & Delaware (Peabody Award winner), DETROPIA (Emmy winner), Norman Lear: Just Another Version of You (2016 Sundance Film Festival), One of Us (2017 Toronto International Film Festival), and the Showtime docuseries, Love Fraud, which had its world premiere at the 2020 Sundance Film Festival and was nominated for an Independent Spirit Award. Grady also co-directed Endangered, a documentary for HBO on the threats faced by journalists around the world.

== Biography ==
She is the stepdaughter of James Grady, author and investigative journalist. Grady was raised Jewish and still considers herself Jewish.

== Career ==
=== Loki Films ===
Many of Grady's prominent film projects have been co-directed and produced by her friend and business partner, Heidi Ewing. Meeting in 1997, Ewing and Grady found camaraderie in their similar approaches to creative projects. Soon thereafter, the two founded Loki Films in 2001, a production company that specializes in both short and feature films, as well as television and commercials.

Grady and Ewing approach their filmmaking with particular interest "in the nuances of the human experience and all of its colours and contours." Says Grady about her experience pursuing these interests: "we have found that in fundamentalist circles, you can learn a lot about human nature…you are asked to believe things that perhaps the majority of society doesn’t agree with".

Being a co-directing team, Grady and Ewing come up with an initial plan and outsource locations and subjects together. From there, the directors separate to conduct solo interviews and filming. When all the footage has been shot, the duo reconvenes to the editing room and compiles their respective material to create their desired film.

=== Film topics ===
Specializing in documentary filmmaking, Grady and Ewing have tackled many controversial topics in their films although they reject the idea that they are "advocacy filmmakers" and say they prefer to have the subjects of their films guide the focus of their stories.

2006's Jesus Camp explores an evangelical Christian summer camp for children. Scholar Michael Friesen says that Jesus Camp raises "important questions about the children's psychological development in a milieu of strong religion". Following the release of the film, the camp was forced to close down after garnering negative attention from its portrayal in the film.

Loki films' feature documentary One of Us debuted on Netflix in 2017. The film exposes many elements of Brooklyn's Hasidic Jewish community.

While developing the framework for One of Us, Grady said, "we started the film with what we always start all projects with, which is personal interest, curiosity". The film intimately deals with the themes of domestic and sexual abuse and the great lengths individuals must go to remove themselves from the community. Grady described the individuals who decided to leave their orthodox communities as "having an enormous amount of bravery and desperation".

Writer David Edelstein of Vulture said that Grady and Ewing did not attempt to make an "objective documentary" but noted the potential challenges that attempting to infiltrate the Hasidic community would pose even to obtain their side of the controversial stories.

== Awards ==
Jesus Camp premiered at the 2006 Tribeca Film Festival and was nominated for Best Documentary Feature at the 79thAcademy Awards.Detropia was placed on the shortlist for Best Documentary Feature at the 85th Academy Awards and One of Us garnered critical acclaim with a 96% rating on Rotten Tomatoes.

== Filmography ==
Year	Film	Subject matter
2005	The Boys of Baraka	Baraka School, Kenya
2006	Jesus Camp	Kids on Fire School of Ministry and Becky Fischer
2008	The Lord's Boot Camp	Teen Missions International
2010	Freakonomics	Economic theory as described by Steven Levitt's book Freakonomics
2010	12th & Delaware	A crisis pregnancy center and an abortion clinic in Fort Pierce, Florida
2012	Detropia	Detroit, Michigan
2012	The Education of Mohammad Hussein	
2016	Norman Lear: Just Another Version of You	Norman Lear
2016	A Dream Preferred	Taharka Bros.
2017	One of Us	Documents three people as they adapt to civilization outside of their Hasidic Jewish community
2020	Love Fraud	True crime documentary miniseries revolves around Richard Scott Smith, who used the internet to prey upon women in search of love and conned them
2022	Endangered	An investigation of threats against journalists in the United States and internationally, from intimidation to physical violence.
2025	Folktales	Teenagers at a folk high school in Norway must rely on each other and a pack of sled dogs as they grow.
