= Nuts (song) =

Single by Lil Peep featuring Rainy Bear

from the album Live Forever
- B-side: "2008"
- Released: December 2, 2015
- Recorded: 2015
- Genre: Hip-hop; emo rap; cloud rap
- Length: 1:25
- Label: AWAL; Autnmy
- Songwriters: Gustav Åhr; Rainy Bear; William Gardner; Baron Black; Michael Furjanic; Neill Livingston
- Producer: Willie G

Lil Peep singles chronology
| "Flannel" (2015) | "Nuts" (2015) |

Audio sample
- Lil Peep ft. Rainy Bear – "Nuts": file; help

Music video
- "Nuts" on YouTube

"Nuts" is a song by the American rapper Lil Peep featuring American singer Rainy Bear. It was originally self-released on December 2, 2015, as the third and final single from his second mixtape, Live Forever (2015), it was written by the duo alongside Neill Livingston and Michael Furjanic, with Willie G handling its production. It is the fourth song Lil Peep and Rainy Bear recorded together. The song was later re-released posthumously through AWAL as a single on December 17, 2021, due to sample clearance issues. The track had gained a huge surge of popularity on platforms such as TikTok.

"Nuts" is an emo rap song, featuring elements of grunge and other subgenres, that incorporates themes of love and drugs. The song features a fast-paced beat and a more sung vocal style from Peep, which contrasting his usual cold and slow vocal delivery.

== Background and composition ==
The song samples "Bright Lights", from the soundtrack of American documentary film Jesus Camp (2006) composed by Force Theory. "Nuts" was produced by Willie G. Due to sample clearance issues, the song would later be re-released posthumously as a single on December 17, 2021, through AWAL. The single saw an increase in popularity on platforms such as TikTok. Lil Skil, a.k.a. Rainy Bear was featured in the credits. "Nuts" is 1 minute and 25 seconds long. It is an alternative rap song that blends emo alongside cloud rap.

== Commercial performance ==
"Nuts" would gain virality online, leading to it breaking several streaming records upon its re-release in 2021. In New Zealand, the song had debuted at number 40 on the RMNZ Hot Singles chart, staying at its position for a week. It would later gain 30,000 sales within its first two years of sales in the country, subsequently going gold in the United Kingdom with about 340 million streams. With over 1.25 billion streams in the United States, it was certified double platinum by the Recording Industry Association of America.

== Credits and personnel ==
Credits adapted from Tidal and Lil Peep's estate website.

- Gustav Ahr – composer, lead vocalist
- Willie G – producer
- Joe LaPorta - mastering
- Baron Black – composer
- Rainy Bear - featured artist
- Neill Livingston – writer, composer
- Michael Furjanic – writer, composer
- William Gardner – composer

== Charts ==
=== Weekly charts ===
Weekly chart performance for "Nuts"
| Chart (2021) | Peak position |
|---|---|
| New Zealand Hot Singles (RMNZ) | 40 |

== Certifications and sales ==
Certifications for "Nuts"
| Region | Certification | Certified units/sales |
|---|---|---|
| Australia (ARIA) | 2× Platinum | 140,000^{‡} |
| New Zealand (RMNZ) | Platinum | 30,000^{‡} |
| United Kingdom (BPI) | Gold | 400,000^{‡} |
| United States (RIAA) | 2× Platinum | 2,000,000^{‡} |
^{‡} Sales+streaming figures based on certification alone.
