= Sudhir Venkatesh =

American sociologist and urban ethnographer

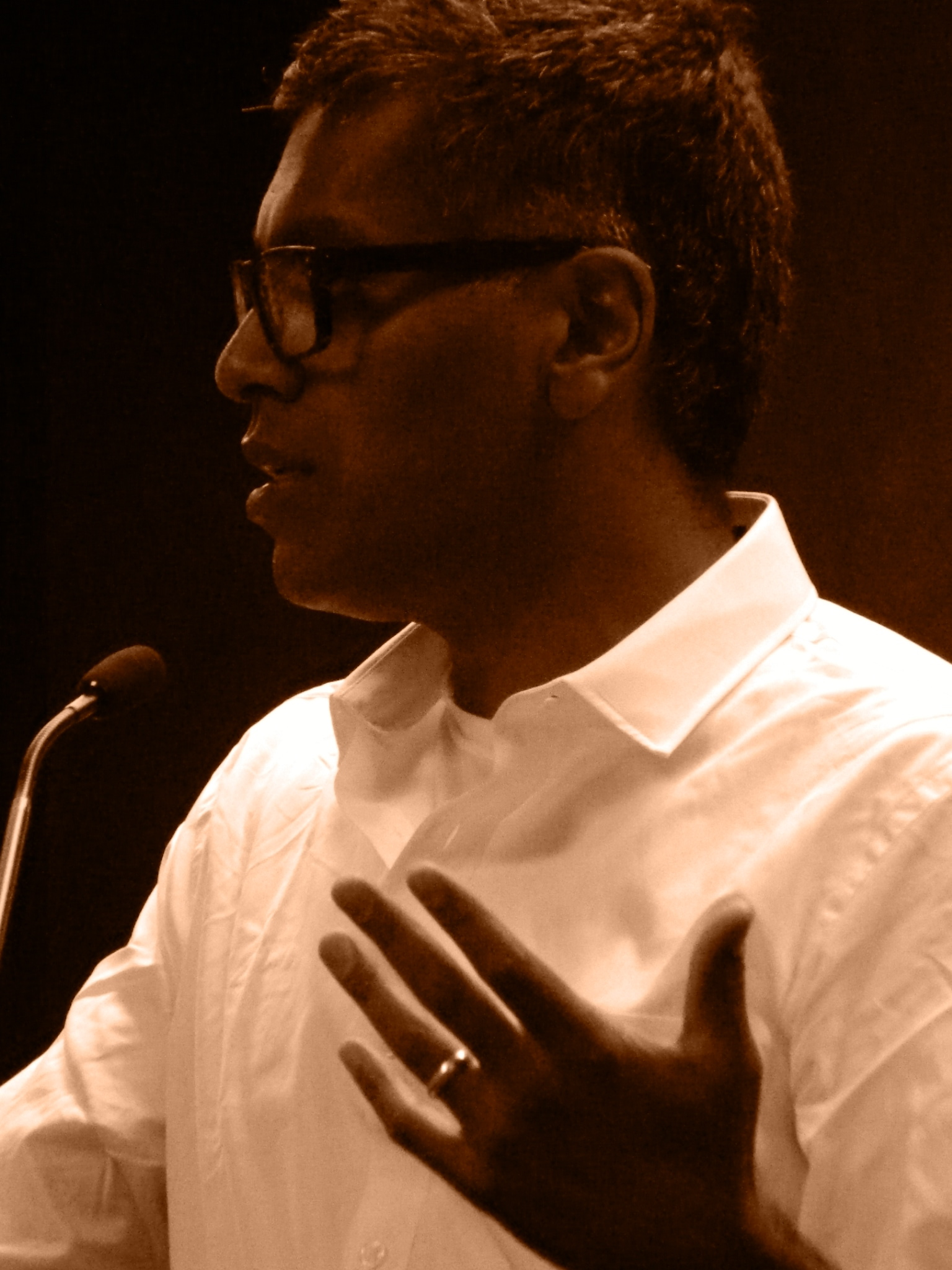
- Venkatesh in September 2013
- Born: Sudhir Alladi Venkatesh; 1966 (age 59–60); Chennai, India
- Education: University of California, San Diego (BA); University of Chicago (PhD)
- Known for: Urban ethnography
- Scientific career
- Fields: Sociology, social economics
- Workplaces: Columbia University; Facebook
- Thesis: American project: a historical-ethnography of Chicago's Robert Taylor Homes
- Academic advisors: William Julius Wilson

Sudhir Alladi Venkatesh (born 1966) is an American sociologist and urban ethnographer. He is William B. Ransford Professor of Sociology & African-American Studies at Columbia University, a position he has held since 1999. In his work, Venkatesh has studied gangs and underground economies, public housing, advertising and technology. As of 2018, he is the Director of Signal: The Tech & Society Lab at Columbia University.

Venkatesh is the author of the book, Gang Leader for a Day: A Rogue Sociologist Takes To The Streets, published by Penguin Press in 2008. Venkatesh is also the host of Sudhir Breaks the Internet, a podcast published by Freakonomics Radio Network. Additionally, Venkatesh is a public writer and documentary filmmaker, and has held positions at Facebook and Twitter.

== Early life and education ==
Born in Madras, now Chennai, and raised in Irvine, California, Venkatesh received a B.A. in mathematics from the University of California, San Diego in 1988. Venkatesh describes his switch from mathematics to sociology in graduate school as a result of conducting ethnographic fieldwork in Chicago's inner-city neighborhoods. In 1997, he earned a Ph.D. in Sociology from the University of Chicago, where he studied under Professor William Julius Wilson, focusing on the Robert Taylor Homes, a housing project in Chicago.

== Freakonomics Radio Network ==
In September 2011, Venkatesh was featured on Freakonomics Radio episode 42, "The Upside of Quitting." Venkatesh was also a Freakonomics blog contributor in 2008, authoring a nine-part blog series titled, "What Do Real Thugs Think of The Wire", in which he reported on the experience of watching episodes of popular crime drama television series The Wire with gang members he knew through his research. In 2021, he began hosting the podcast Sudhir Breaks the Internet, which focuses on the tech industry, particularly social media companies.

== Academic career ==
Venkatesh is William B. Ransford Professor of Sociology & African-American Studies at Columbia University, a position he has held continuously since 1999. He was awarded the National Science Foundation NSF CAREER award in 2000. From 1996 to 1999, Venkatesh was elected as a Junior Fellow in the Society of Fellows at Harvard University.

=== Advertising and technology ===
Since 2013, Venkatesh has been writing about the advertising industry, both in academic journals and the popular press. His current research examines the strategies platforms use to handle negative behavior. Venkatesh served as the Academic Director of the Berlin School of Creative Leadership, a global Executive MBA program for the advertising industry, from 2011 to 2012. As of 2018, Venkatesh is also currently a Co-Director of the Social Media Governance Initiative, a joint effort between the SIGNAL Lab at Columbia University and Yale University's Justice Collaboratory with the goal of ensuring that digital technologies foster healthy online interaction.

Fast Company, an American business magazine, has published four articles by Venkatesh on the topics of advertising and technology: "Thinking Small: 3 Ways To Remain Creative In A World Of Big Data", "Can Advertising Bring Back The Rust Belt?", "How To Use Conflict To Unlock Creativity", and "The Science Of Awards: Your Data-Driven Guide To Winning At Cannes".

=== Public housing ===
After earning his Ph.D. in Sociology from the University of Chicago in 1997, Venkatesh went on to write an award-winning book, American Project: The Rise and Fall of a Modern Ghetto, published by Harvard University Press in 2000. Based on nearly a decade of doctoral fieldwork in Chicago's Robert Taylor Homes, American Project "seeks to reexamine public housing from the inside out, and to salvage its troubled legacy."

The following year, Venkatesh co-authored a study on public housing with Steven D. Levitt, titled "Growing Up in the Projects: The Economic Lives of a Cohort of Men who Came of Age in Chicago Public Housing", which was published in the American Economic Review.

=== Gangs and underground economies ===
In 2008 Venkatesh authored a book titled, Gang Leader for a Day: A Rogue Sociologist Takes To The Streets. The book chronicles the life of urban poor in Chicago, particularly the Robert Taylor Homes and the gang, the Black Kings, whose leader J.T. he befriended (J.T. was renamed in the book for anonymity). He found that most foot soldiers in drug gangs make only $3.30 an hour. The year it came out, Gang Leader for a Day was awarded Best Book awards from The Economist and Slate.com. In 2015, Facebook CEO Mark Zuckerberg selected the book for his "A Year of Books" book club. In 2017, it was reported that AMC Networks would be developing a drama series adaptation from the book.

Two years prior, Venkatesh authored another book about illegal economies in Chicago, titled Off the Books: The Underground Economy of the Urban Poor. Published by Harvard University Press in 2006, Off the Books received a Best Book Award from Slate.com in 2006, as well as the C. Wright Mills Award in 2006.

In a separate research project with Steven Levitt, Venkatesh hired former sex workers to track working street prostitutes in Chicago, finding that they make about $30 to $35 an hour, with those working with pimps making more and suffering fewer arrests. A street prostitute was arrested about once per 450 sexual encounters ("tricks"). Condoms were used in only 20% of the contacts. Together, Venkatesh and Levitt co-authored two articles in 2000, "'Are We a Family or a Business?' History and Disjuncture in the Urban American Street Gang" and "The Financial Activities of an Urban Street Gang."

Venkatesh's 2022 book, The Tomorrow Game: Rival Teenagers, Their Race for a Gun, and a Community United to Save Them, focuses on families surviving poverty and gun violence in a Southside Chicago community

=== Academic and research administration ===
Venkatesh served as director of the MA in Global Thought for Columbia University's Committee on Global Thought from 2015 to 2016. For three years from 2009-2012, he was a Senior Research Advisor for the Department of Justice. At the same time, from 2011 to 2012, Venkatesh served as Academic Director for the Berlin School of Creative Leadership.

In 2009 Venkatesh became director of Columbia University's Institute for Social and Economic Research and Policy, or ISERP. In 2011 Venkatesh was the subject of an investigation on inappropriate spending and misappropriation of funds at ISERP. In 2012 Venkatesh revealed to The New York Times that he had reimbursed Columbia University for approximately $13,000 of $240,000 of funds that were misallocated during his tenure as director of ISERP.

Before becoming director of ISERP, Venkatesh served as director of the Center for Urban Research & Policy at Columbia University from 2004 to 2008. Additionally, he served as Director of Ethnography & Principal Investigator of the Multi-City Gun Project from 2018 to 2020.

== Work with social media companies ==
Venkatesh was hired in 2016 to help Facebook deal with bullying and misinformation and was let go from the company in 2018. In late 2018, Venkatesh started advising Twitter as Director of Social Science Research and Health Research.

== Public writing and documentaries ==
Venkatesh's editorial writings have appeared in The New York Times, the Chicago Tribune, and The Washington Post. He writes for Slate.com, and his stories have appeared in This American Life, Wired, and on National Public Radio.

Venkatesh's first two documentary projects relate to his research in public housing. He directed and produced Transformation: A History of Public Housing, a three-part documentary series that aired on PBS in 2003 and was awarded the Best Documentary Series Award by the Associated Press. His first documentary film, Dislocation, which aired on PBS in 2005, followed families as they relocated from condemned public housing developments. His most recent documentary film project, titled At the Top of My Voice, follows a scholar and artist who return to the ex-Soviet republic of Georgia to promote democracy and safeguard human rights.

== Selected works ==
=== Books ===
- American Project. The Rise and Fall of a Modern Ghetto, Harvard University Press, 2000
- Off the Books. The Underground Economy of the Urban Poor, Harvard University Press, 2006
- Gang Leader for a Day: A Rogue Sociologist Takes to the Streets, Penguin Press, 2008
- Floating City: A Rogue Sociologist Lost and Found in New York's Underground Economy, Penguin Press, 2013

He has also contributed to Steven Levitt and Stephen Dubner's Freakonomics in a chapter entitled, "Why Do Drug Dealers Still Live With Their Moms?"

=== Documentaries ===
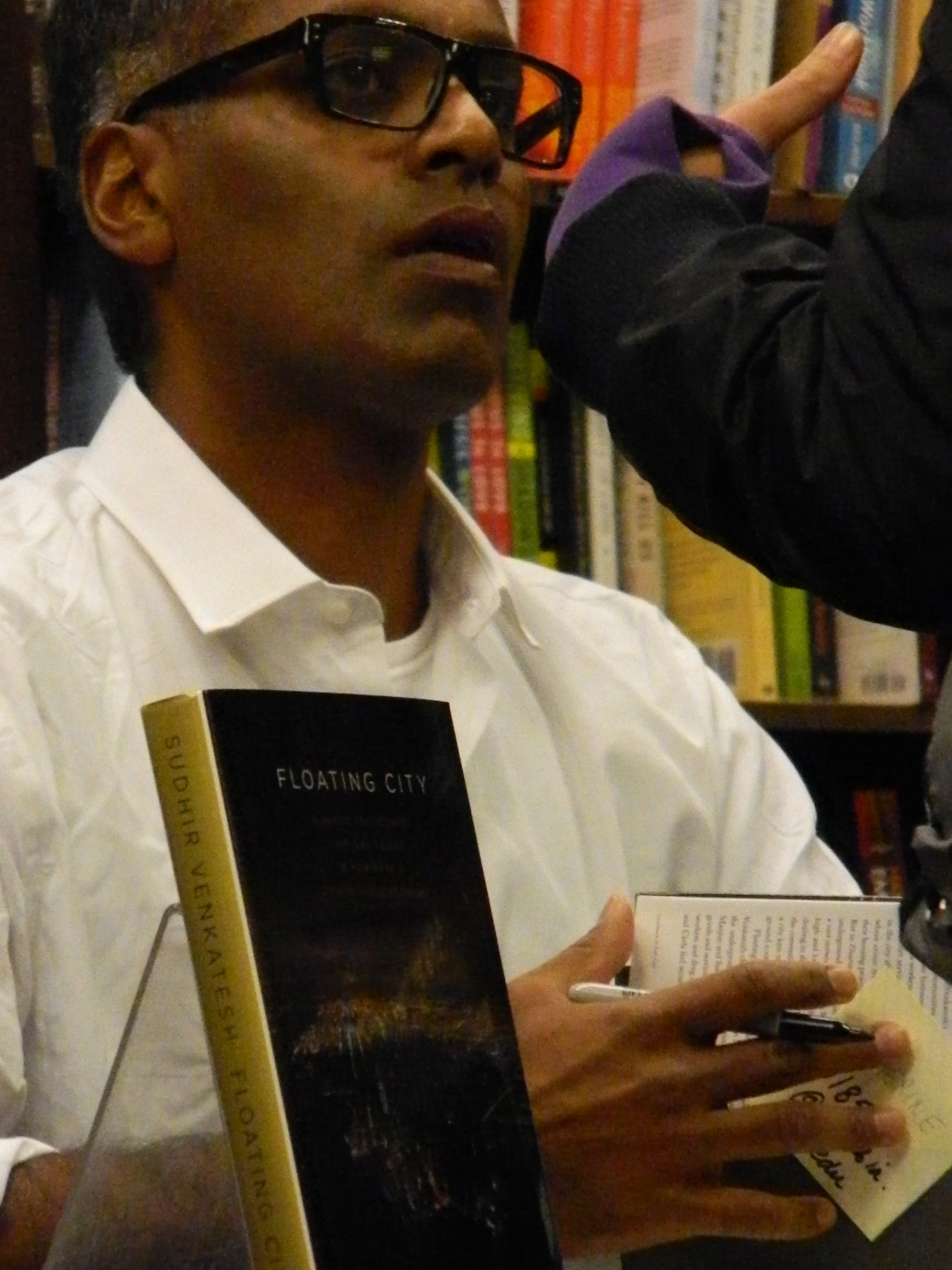
Venkatesh at a New York book signing

- Dislocation – In February 2002, families living in the Robert Taylor Homes public housing development were given a 180-day notice of eviction. In six months, the community that had been their home for generations would be demolished. Dislocation chronicles the lives of tenants in one building as they move through the six-month relocation process.
- At-Risk – This book highlights both the experiences of individuals who are operating under conditions of risk and the efforts of organizations who are providing assistance to them. The film will focus on the role of the United States as a place of refuge and a base for advocacy.
- Abhidya – This narrative feature film examines one South Asian-American woman's exposure to the post-9/11 effects on her community.
- At the Top of My Voice – a 2009 documentary about events in the Republic of Georgia in late 2007 and early 2008.

=== Public writings ===
- "The Science of Awards." Fast Company, May 3, 2013.
- "Understanding Kids, Gangs and Guns," Op-Ed. New York Times. October 4, 2012.
- "Tide Is an Affordable Status Symbol," Op-Ed, New York Times, January 2013.
- "How the Federal Government is Killing Community Policing." New Republic. October 2012.
- "Keep the Economy Underground." Op-Ed, New York Times. January 16, 2010.
- "Feeling Too Down to Rise Up." Op-Ed, New York Times. March 28, 2009.
- "But What Does it Mean for Prostitutes? How the financial crisis affects the oldest profession." Slate.com. September 26, 2008.
- "To Fight Poverty, Tear Down HUD." Op-Ed, New York Times. July 25, 2008.
- "An Invisible Community." The American Prospect. September–October, 1997: 35-41.
- "Jeunes a' la Derive dans les Villes Americaines." Le Monde Diplomatique. May, 1994 (translated into Italian, "Giovani alla derive nelle citta' americane.' Il Manifesto, June 1994.)
