= 2008 (disambiguation) =

2008 was a leap year starting on Tuesday of the Gregorian calendar.

2008 may also refer to:

- 2008 (number)
- "2008", a song by Lil Peep from the mixtape Live Forever, 2015
- Peugeot 2008, a 2013–present French subcompact SUV
  - Peugeot 2008 DKR, a 2016 French rally raid car
- Zotye 2008, a 2005–2016 Chinese subcompact SUV
