= SuperFreakonomics =

2009 book by Steven Levitt and Stephen J. Dubner

SuperFreakonomics: Global Cooling, Patriotic Prostitutes, and Why Suicide Bombers Should Buy Life Insurance
- Hardcover edition
- Author: Steven D. Levitt, Stephen J. Dubner
- Subject: Economy, sociology
- Genre: Non-fiction
- Publisher: William Morrow
- Publication date: October 20, 2009
- Publication place: United States
- Media type: Hardcover
- Pages: 288 pp.
- ISBN: 0-06-088957-8
- Preceded by: Freakonomics
- Followed by: Think Like a Freak

SuperFreakonomics: Global Cooling, Patriotic Prostitutes, and Why Suicide Bombers Should Buy Life Insurance is the second non-fiction book by University of Chicago economist Steven Levitt and The New York Times journalist Stephen J. Dubner, released in early October 2009 in Europe and on October 20, 2009 in the United States. It is a sequel to Freakonomics: A Rogue Economist Explores the Hidden Side of Everything.

== Synopsis ==
The explanatory note states that the theme of the book explores the concept that all people work for a particular reward. The introduction states people should look at problems economically. The examples given include the preference for sons in India and the hardships Indian women face, as well as the horse manure issue at the turn of the 20th century.

The first chapter explores prostitution and pimps in South Chicago, one high class escort, and real estate brokers. The pimps and brokers are compared based on the idea that they are helping to sell one's services to the larger market. Inequalities in pay grades for men and women are also covered in the chapter.

The second chapter is about patterns and details. Patterns in the ages of soccer players, health issues of children in the womb during Ramadan, and the upbringings of terrorists are observed. Next, the book discusses the skills of hospital doctors and how Azyxxi was created, and draws parallels to how terrorists in the UK were tracked down by banks.

Altruism is discussed in the third chapter, and uses examples of the murder of Kitty Genovese, crime rates as affected by television, and economic experimental games such as prisoner's dilemma, ultimatum, and the work of John A. List.

The fourth chapter is about unintended consequences and simple fixes. It goes into detail about Ignaz Semmelweis' work in hospitals, use of seatbelts and child seats, and the possibility of reducing hurricanes.

The fifth chapter discusses externalities and global warming. It discusses how economics does not necessarily take environmental issues into account. While interviewing Nathan Myhrvold and Ken Caldeira from Intellectual Ventures, the authors posit an alternative way of solving global warming by stratospheric aerosol injection.

The epilogue is about microeconomics, and discusses a study by Laurie Santos and Keith Chen as to whether capuchin monkeys can be trained to use money.

== Reception ==
SuperFreakonomics has been praised for its entertainment value, but has drawn criticism for taking unconventional approaches to its subject matter, particularly global warming.

In the Financial Times, Tim Harford, author of The Undercover Economist, said that SuperFreakonomics "is a lot like Freakonomics, but better." BusinessWeek gave the book three and a half stars out of five, saying that the book is "[a]n inventive and even useful application of economics to unusual subjects".

=== Global warming section ===
In the book's fifth chapter, the author proposes that the climate system can be intentionally regulated by construction of a stratoshield or a fleet of marine cloud seeders.

The chapter has been criticized by economists and climate science experts who say it contains numerous misleading statements and discredited arguments. Among the critics are Paul Krugman, Brad DeLong, Raymond Pierrehumbert, The Guardian, Bloomberg News, and The Economist. Elizabeth Kolbert, a science writer for The New Yorker who has written extensively on global warming, contends that "just about everything they [Levitt and Dubner] have to say on the topic is, factually speaking, wrong."

Joseph Romm said that SuperFreakonomics had seriously misrepresented the position of climate scientist Ken Caldeira; the book says among other things, that Caldeira's research tells him CO_{2} is "not the right villain", an assertion Caldeira strongly disputes.

Caldeira has commented

I believe all of the ideas attributed to me are based on fact, with the exception of the 'carbon dioxide is not the right villain' line. That said, when I am speaking, I place these facts in a very different context and draw different policy conclusions.... I believe the authors to have worked in good faith. They draw different conclusions than I draw from the same facts, but as authors of the book, that is their prerogative.

Dubner responded that with hindsight the line describing Ken Caldeira overstated his position, but noted that Caldeira had been sent a preview of the text and had approved it.

Caldeira has acknowledged that he did receive the preview, but disagreed that the errors were his responsibility: "I feel no need to read, fact check, or make detailed comments on documents that arrive in my in-box. I have lots of other things to do, like trying to get my science out the door." As it transpired, Dubner had been apprised of Caldeira's objection to the "right villain" assertion, but did not delete the line as Caldeira expected, although Caldeira believes this was due to a good faith misunderstanding.

Regarding their own views on global warming, Levitt and Dubner have stated on their Freakonomics blog that global warming is "a man-made phenomenon" and "an important issue to solve". They go on to explain that where they differ with the establishment view is in what the most effective solutions to that problem are. For an establishment review of how Levitt and Dubner use arithmetic in their dismissal of the solar photovoltaic option to mitigate global warming, see Raymond Pierrehumbert's open letter to Steven Levitt at Realclimate.org.

== Illustrated edition ==
In 2010, Levitt and Dubner released an illustrated edition of SuperFreakonomics.

== See also ==
- Global warming controversy
- Scientific opinion on climate change
