= When to Rob a Bank =

2015 book by Steven D. Levitt and Stephen J. Dubner

When to Rob a Bank: ...And 131 More Warped Suggestions and Well-Intended Rants
- First edition (US)
- Author: Steven D. Levitt; Stephen J. Dubner
- Language: English
- Subject: Economics, Sociology
- Genre: Non-fiction
- Publisher: William Morrow (US); Allen Lane (UK)
- Publication date: May 5, 2015
- Publication place: United States
- Media type: Print, e-book, audiobook
- Pages: 400 pp (hardback edition)
- ISBN: 978-0-06-238532-1
- Preceded by: Think Like a Freak

When to Rob a Bank: ...And 131 More Warped Suggestions and Well-Intended Rants is an edited collection of blog posts by American authors Steven Levitt and Stephen J. Dubner, authors of the Freakonomics series. It was published by HarperCollins imprint William Morrow on May 5, 2015.

== Overview ==
It takes quick looks at a variety of topics, including car seats, terrorism, aptonyms, obesity, performance-enhancing substances, and attempts to ban internet gambling. The pieces are taken from the companion website that the authors first developed with the 2005 publication of Freakonomics, and continued to post new content to over the following decade.

== Reception ==
Reviews of the collection were mixed. Kirkus Reviews called it "another kooky and counterintuitive compilation of economic analysis that might appear wildly offbeat but just might be surprisingly spot-on." Publishers Weekly wrote that "Lively, self-deprecating writing ensures an entertaining read for fans and new readers alike". Robbie Millen of The London Times, in contrast, wrote that the collection lacked the appeal of the authors' previous volumes.
