= Live Forever (mixtape) =

Mixtape by Lil Peep
- Released: December 2, 2015
- Recorded: 2015
- Genres: Rock; emo rap; cloud rap; trap
- Length: 20:17
- Labels: Self-released; AUTNMY (re-release)
- Producers: Brobak; Fleance; Hector Vae; Kryptik; Mysticphonk; Paulie Leparik; Willie G

Lil Peep chronology
Romeo's Regrets (2015)	Live Forever (2015)	Vertigo (2015)

Alternative cover
- Unedited cover artwork

Singles from Live Forever
- 1. "Flannel" Released: November 4, 2015; 2. "Live Forever" Released: July 1, 2021; 3. "Nuts" Released: December 17, 2021

Lil Peep mixtape chronology
Mall Musicc (2015)	Live Forever (2015)	Crybaby (2016)

Live Forever is the second solo mixtape by American rapper Lil Peep. It was released on December 2, 2015. The mixtape was preceded by two singles, "Flannel" and "Haunt U", and three additional singles were issued posthumously, including the viral hit "Nuts". The mixtape was later re-released on the seventh anniversary of the mixtape's release in 2022.

== Background and composition ==
"Live Forever" was originally released in 2015, and a music video for the title track would be released on December 16, 2015. The mixtape would later be re-released to all platforms in 2022, due to sample clearance issues. The artwork was created by ArtByChase.

== Track listing ==
Live Forever track listing
No.	Title	Writer(s)	Producer(s)	Length
1.	"Angeldust"	Gustav Åhr; Chad Phonk	Mysticphonk	1:51
2.	"Mirror, Mirror"	Åhr; Hector Chavez	Hector Vaé	1:43
3.	"Pick Me Up" (featuring Yunggoth)	Åhr; Luis Venegas; Ed O'Brien; Jonny Greenwood; Colin Greenwood; Thom Yorke; Philip Selway	Fleance	2:49
4.	"Nuts" (featuring Rainy Bear)	Åhr; Bear; William Gardner; Baron Black; Michael Furjanic; Neill Livingston	Willie G	1:25
5.	"Haunt U"	Åhr; Phonk; Martin Puschel	Mysticphonk	1:57
6.	"Vibe"	Åhr; Paul Leparik; Róbert Forgács; Szabolcs Boros	Paulie Leparik	1:52
7.	"Live Forever"	Åhr; Nicholas Brobak; Rob Dell	Brobak	2:40
8.	"Flannel"	Åhr; Gardner; Laurence Andrew Tolhurst; Robert James Smith; Simon Johnathon Gallup	Willie G	1:58
9.	"2008"	Åhr; Chavez; Brian Warner; Jeordie White; Stephen Bier Jr; Timothy Linton	Hector Vaé	1:43
10.	"Give U the Moon"	Åhr; Cabe Brown; Evan Pharmakis	Kryptik	2:19
Total length:				20:17

Notes

- "Angeldust" samples the loop "Lovely Guitar Loop Clean" by djole94hns.
- "Pick Me Up" samples Yasmin De Laine's cover of "Climbing Up the Walls" by Radiohead.
- "Nuts" samples "Bright Lights", from the Jesus Camp soundtrack by Force Theory.
- "Haunt U" samples the loop "If Time Could Stand Still" by Minor2Go.
- "Vibe" samples "Eastern Smell of Death" by Siculicidium.
- "Live Forever" samples "Just a Boy" by Walleater.
- "Flannel" samples "The Drowning Man" by The Cure.
- "2008" samples "Coma White" by Marilyn Manson.
- "Give U the Moon" samples "Level Head" by Wind in Sails.

== Charts ==
Chart performance for Live Forever
Chart (2022–2024)	Peak position
Belgian Albums (Ultratop Flanders)	82
Lithuanian Albums (AGATA)	80
UK Independent Albums (Official Charts)	42
