= Heidi Ewing =

American documentary filmmaker

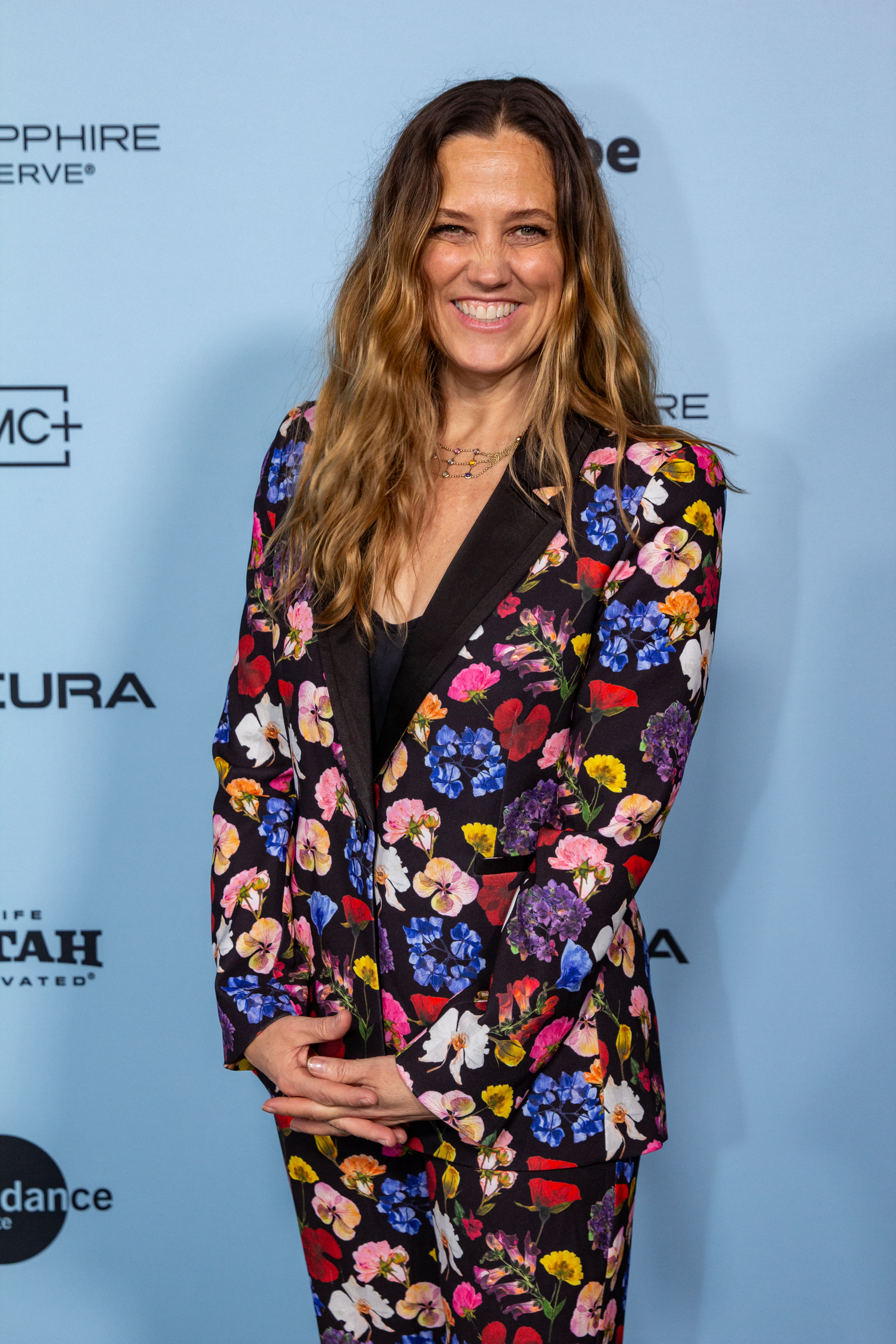
- Ewing at the 2025 Sundance Film Festival
- Occupation: Filmmaker
- Known for: Observational filmmaking.

Heidi Ewing is an American documentary filmmaker and the co-director of Folktales, Jesus Camp, The Boys of Baraka, 12th & Delaware, DETROPIA, Norman Lear: Just Another Version of You, One of Us, Love Fraud (series), I Carry You With Me (narrative), and Endangered.

== Biography ==
Ewing is a native of the Detroit area. She was introduced to film by her father, who encouraged her and her siblings to watch Fellini films at a young age. But her exposure to Alfred Hitchcock's "Vertigo" at the age of ten had the greatest impact. "It blew my mind into thousands of pieces, and I couldn't stop going back to see it over and over again," she says. "I didn't know something could be so potent."

Ewing graduated from Mercy High School and attended and graduated from Georgetown University.

In 2001, she and Rachel Grady founded Loki Films in New York.

Her first film as a director was the short "Dissident: Oswaldo Paya and The Varela Project," which was financed by the National Democratic Institute about the now deceased activist and his efforts to promote human rights in Cuba.

Her first feature-length documentary, "The Boys of Baraka," was co-directed with Rachel Grady. The film, made with ITVS, premiered at the South by Southwest Film Festival and was released theatrically by ThinkFilm before airing on PBS. The film follows a group of 12-year-old boys from Baltimore who leave home for an experimental middle school in rural Kenya.

In 2006, she and Grady released "Jesus Camp," which premiered at The Tribeca Film Festival and was released by Magnolia Pictures. The film was nominated for the 2006 Academy Award.

In 2011, she returned to her native Detroit to make "DETROPIA," an impressionistic documentary focusing on the challenges of a shrinking city and those who refuse to give up on it. The film premiered at the 2012 Sundance Film Festival and won the editing award

In 2017, she co-directed the Netflix Original film "One of Us," which follows three Hasidic Jews who attempt to leave the insular community and pursue a secular life. The film premiered at the 2017 Toronto International Film Festival. Ewing appeared on Charlie Rose in October 2017 to discuss the film and said that Hasidic Jews died disproportionally in the Holocaust because they "refused to blend in". She later apologized.

Ewing made her narrative debut in 2020 with "I Carry You With Me," a love story based on her two close friends, Ivan and Gerardo, who had emigrated to the United States from a conservative town in Mexico. The film began as a documentary, but over the course of the process, Ewing realized it was best presented as a narrative film with non-fiction elements woven through. The film made its world premiere at the 2020 Sundance Film Festival, winning the jury and audience awards in the festival's NEXT section. The film was nominated for two Independent Spirit Awards and was released by Sony Pictures Classics in 2021.

"Love Fraud," the four-part series co-directed by Ewing, debuted on Showtime in August 2020 after premiering as one of the opening night selections at the 2020 Sundance Film Festival. It was nominated for a 2020 Cinema Eye Award.

In 2021, co-directed "Endangered," a film for HBO on the silencing of journalists around the world. The film premiered at the Tribeca Film Festival in 2022.It was nominated for a News and Doc Emmy in 2023.

Her next film, FOLKTALES, an observational film made in Northern Norway about students who attend a dog-sledding-focused Folk High School, premiered at the 2025 Sundance Film Festival and was picked up by Magnolia Pictures for a theatrical release, which happened in July and August 2025.

== Filmography ==
Film	Year	Subject matter	Notes
The Boys of Baraka	2005	Baraka School, Kenya	
Jesus Camp	2006	Kids On Fire School of Ministry, Becky Fischer	
The Lord's Boot Camp	2008	Teen Missions International	Produced and aired for 48 Hours
Freakonomics (segment "Can You Bribe a 9th Grader to Succeed?")	2010	2005 book of the same name	
12th & Delaware	2010	A crisis pregnancy center and an abortion clinic in Fort Pierce, Florida	
Detropia	2012	Detroit, Michigan	
The Education of Mohammad Hussein	2012		
Norman Lear: Just Another Version of You	2016	Norman Lear	
A Dream Preferred	2016	Taharka Bros.	
One of Us	2017	Four former members of the Hasidic Jewish community.	
I Carry You With Me	2020	Narrative film	
Love Fraud	2020	True crime documentary miniseries revolves around Richard Scott Smith, who used the internet to prey upon women in search of love and conned them	
Endangered	2022	An investigation of threats against journalists in the United States and internationally, from intimidation to physical violence.	
Folktales	2025	Teenagers at a folk high school in Norway, rely on each other and a pack of sled dogs as they grow.	
