= Love Fraud =

American true crime documentary miniseries

- Genre: Documentary
- Directed by: Heidi Ewing; Rachel Grady
- Music by: T. Griffin
- Original language: English
- No. of episodes: 4

Production
- Executive producers: Heidi Ewing; Rachel Grady; Amy Goodman Kass; Vinnie Malhotra; Jihan Robinson; Michael Bloom; Maria Zuckerman
- Producer: Alex Takats
- Cinematography: Alex Takats
- Editor: JD Marlow
- Production companies: Showtime Documentary Films; Topic Studios; Loki Films

Original release
- Network: Showtime
- Release: August 30 – September 20, 2020

Love Fraud is an American true crime documentary television miniseries, directed by Heidi Ewing and Rachel Grady, about the hunt for a serial romance scammer. It premiered on August 30, 2020, on Showtime.

== Production ==
The filmmakers wanted to make a series about a con artist, but not one that was a cold case, resolved, or well known. They decided on their subject after producer Alex Takats read the blog of a woman who had accused her former husband of fraud. There was an arrest warrant, but his whereabouts were unknown. The filmmakers decided not to be a "fly on the wall", but instead intervene to fund the investigation. The series began filming in December 2017.

== Release ==
The series had its world premiere at the Sundance Film Festival on January 23, 2020. It was initially scheduled to premiere on Showtime on May 8, 2020, but this was delayed to August 30, 2020, due to the COVID-19 pandemic.

== Subject ==
The series is a "manhunt", following efforts of private detectives hired by the filmmakers, including bounty hunter Carla Campbell, to find a man from Lenexa, Kansas named Richard Scott Smith. Smith was accused by multiple women, including some he married, of romance scams. He is accused of being married at least ten times and to more than one woman at a time, and being accused of using multiple identities. His former partners accused him of using their identities to make purchases and obtain credit, leaving them severely in debt. He was put on probation in 2015 in Polk County, Iowa after being charged with domestic abuse assault. After one former partner went to the police in 2017, he pleaded guilty to identity theft and received a 10-month jail sentence, later violating probation.

The women each tell their stories of how they met Smith and came to be duped, and the film explores what led Smith to act in these ways. Smith appears on camera in the final episode in "what can most charitably be described as a dumpster fire of an interview", according to the Kansas City Star.

== Reception ==
On Rotten Tomatoes, the series holds an approval rating of 92% based on 24 reviews, with an average rating of 8/10. The website's critical consensus reads, "Explosive, but never exploitive, Love Fraud tells a thrilling tale of online dating gone terribly wrong with expert precision and a welcome dose of empathy." On Metacritic, the series holds a rating of 77 out of 100, based on 13 critics, indicating "generally favorable reviews".

== Episodes ==
No.	Title	Directed by	Original release date	U.S. viewers (millions)
1	"You Just Gotta Trust Me"	Heidi Ewing; Rachel Grady	August 30, 2020	0.135
2	"Wichita"	Heidi Ewing; Rachel Grady	September 6, 2020	0.142
3	"I'm Glad You Called"	Heidi Ewing; Rachel Grady	September 13, 2020	0.149
4	"How Did You Guys See This Thing Ending?"	Heidi Ewing; Rachel Grady	September 20, 2020	0.111

=== Accolades ===
Year	Award	Category	Nominees	Result	Ref.
2021	Cinema Eye Honors	Outstanding Achievement in Nonfiction Series for Broadcast	Heidi Ewing & Rachel Grady	Nominated	
2021	Independent Spirit Awards	Best New Non-Scripted or Documentary Series	Heidi Ewing, Rachel Grady, Amy Goodman Kass, Jihan Robinson, Michael Bloom and Maria Zuckerman	Nominated	
2021	Critics' Choice Real TV Awards	Best Limited Documentary Series	Love Fraud	Pending	
