= Freakonomics (film) =

- Theatrical poster
- Directed by: Heidi Ewing; Alex Gibney; Seth Gordon; Rachel Grady; Eugene Jarecki; Morgan Spurlock
- Written by: Peter Bull; Alex Gibney; Jeremy Chilnick; Morgan Spurlock; Eugene Jarecki; Heidi Ewing; Rachel Grady; Seth Gordon
- Produced by: Chad Troutwine; Chris Romano; Dan O'Meara
- Cinematography: Junji Aoki; Derek Hallquist; Tony Hardmon; Darren Lew; Daniel Marracino; Ferne Pearlstein; Rob VanAlkemade
- Edited by: Douglas Blush; Tova Goodman; Sloane Klevin; Luis Lopez; Nelson Ryland; Michael Taylor
- Music by: Paul Brill; Craig DeLeon; Michael Furjanic; Human; Mike MacAllister; Peter Nashel; Jon Spurney; Michael Wandmacher
- Production companies: Chad Troutwine Films; Cold Fusion Media Group; Green Film Company; Human Worldwide; Jigsaw Productions; Loki Films
- Distributed by: Magnolia Pictures
- Release dates: April 30, 2010 (Tribeca); November 2010 (United States)
- Running time: 85 minutes
- Country: United States
- Language: English
- Budget: $2.9 million
- Box office: $122,216

Freakonomics: The Movie is a 2010 American documentary film based on the 2005 nonfiction book Freakonomics: A Rogue Economist Explores the Hidden Side of Everything written by economist Steven D. Levitt and writer Stephen J. Dubner. The film premiered at the Tribeca Film Festival in April 2010, and had a theatrical release later that year.

== Segments ==
1. A Roshanda by Any Other Name: Directed by Morgan Spurlock, this segment investigates the possible implications of names in personal development and social advancement.
2. Pure Corruption: Directed by Alex Gibney, this segment explores the Japanese concept of yaochō (match fixing) in sumo wrestling.
3. It's Not Always a Wonderful Life: Narrated by Melvin Van Peebles and directed by Eugene Jarecki, this segment explores the question of what led to a decline in the urban crime rate in the US during the mid- to late-1990s. The authors of Freakonomics suggest that a substantial factor was the 1973 US Supreme Court case Roe v. Wade, which conferred the right to choose to have an abortion.
4. Can You Bribe a 9th Grader to Succeed?: Director and filmmaker Rachel Grady documented an experiment in Chicago Heights, Illinois, to determine the efficacy of paying students to achieve higher grades.

== Cast ==
- Carl Alleyne as Boyfriend
- Zoe Sloane as Blake
- Adesuwa Addy Iyare as Temptress’ Mother
- Jade Viggiano as High School Girl
- Sammuel Soifer as Jake
- Jalani McNair as Loser
- Andrew Greiche as Jake
- Alyssa Wheeldon as High School Girl
- Greg Crowe as Johnny the Mechanic
- Hassan Brown as Father
- Kelli Chaves as High School Girl
- Amancaya Aguilar as Mercedes
- Rick Owens as Tad
- Kellie Gerardi as Lexus

== Reception ==
On the review aggregator website Rotten Tomatoes, 66% of 64 critics' reviews are positive, with an average rating of 6.1/10. The website's consensus reads: "More disjointed and less compelling than the book it's based on, Freakonomics isn't quite as entertaining or educational as it should be." Metacritic, which uses a weighted average, assigned the film a score of 58 out of 100, based on 23 critics, indicating "mixed or average" reviews.

== See also ==
- List of American films of 2010
