= Daraja Academy =

- Nanyuki, Laikipia; Kenya

Information
- School type: Secondary Boarding School
- Established: 2009; 17 years ago
- Founders: Jenni and Jason Doherty
- Gender: Girls

Daraja Academy is a boarding school providing secondary education for Kenyan girls. The school is located outside of Nanyuki, Kenya.

== History ==
Daraja Academy was founded in 2009 by Jenni and Jason Doherty – educators from the San Francisco Bay Area who, after visiting Kenya in 2006, saw the need for girls’ education in the country. Noting the degree to which gender determined educational opportunity and the correlation between education and job opportunity, the Dohertys realized they could work toward a solution by establishing a school for girls who had no other means of continuing their education.

To realize this vision, the Dohertys partnered with Kenyan educator Victoria Gichuhi, now Daraja’s head of school. Gichuhi’s experience and leadership in Kenya gave the Dohertys a partner who could efficiently navigate local laws and policies, and so together they envisioned a boarding school that would best suit the girls they aimed to help, addressing both girls’ physical needs in addition to providing a rigorous academic curriculum, and bolstering them as women and leaders. The school was christened "Daraja", meaning "bridge", symbolizing the belief that "for Kenyan girls, secondary education is the fastest bridge out of poverty."

While it opened with a freshman class of 26 girls, the school’s enrollment has grown to accommodate 129 girls across four grade levels.

== Academics ==
=== Admissions ===
Admissions at Daraja Academy are highly competitive, with the school receiving hundreds of applicants each year. The selection process consists of an application period that culminates in a series of interviews. Throughout the applications, the school examines students based on a combination of need, academic scores, and leadership potential.

As Daraja Academy aims to help underprivileged girls, none of its students are required to spend money on tuition, with the academy providing a full four-year scholarship, room, board, uniforms, and health and hygiene services. However, in return, each student commits to “pay forward” her education through providing a minimum of 30 hours of community service per year. Girls frequently volunteer in hospitals, churches, and schools.

=== WISH Program ===
Standing for “Women of Integrity, Strength, and Hope,” WISH is a program developed and implemented at Daraja Academy in order to empower girls to become leaders in their communities. In addition to giving girls confidence and leadership skills, the program also enables them to become changemakers, working in turn to reduce poverty and conflict in their lives, families, and communities.

In line with their mission of reaching as many girls as possible, Daraja’s WISH Program has been shared with other schools. As of 2023, In addition to Daraja Academy, WISH is also taught at six public high schools in Laikipia County. Though it currently reaches 690 girls annually, Daraja aims to expand its WISH curriculum to help over 5,000 girls by 2025.

=== Transition Program ===
To complement its high school, Daraja Academy also offers a transition program to bridge the six-month gap between exit examinations and the start of college or university. This four-month-long program focuses on teaching life-skills and entrepreneurial training to prepare Daraja graduates for “college, careers, and long-term community service.”

The program is made necessary by Kenya’s youth unemployment rate, which reaches upwards of 23%. Yet despite this, graduates of the Daraja Transition Program consistently earn employment within three months of completing their education, with earnings three times the national average.

== In Other Media ==
Daraja Academy has been featured in two documentaries: Girls of Daraja and School of My Dreams, both made by Executive Producer Deborah Santana and produced by Out of the Blue Films, Inc. The school’s campus, which was originally home to the Baraka School, was the subject of a documentary titled The Boys of Baraka. Additionally, the school is frequently featured on Kenya’s citizen TV.

== See also ==
- Education in Kenya
- List of schools in Kenya
- Poverty in Kenya
- Female education
