= Tell Me Something I Don't Know =

Tell Me Something I Don't Know may refer to:

- "Tell Me Something I Don't Know" (Selena Gomez song), 2008
- "Tell Me Something I Don't Know" (Charlie Major song), 1995
- "Tell Me Something I Don't Know", a song by Mindy McCready from the 1996 album Ten Thousand Angels
- Tell Me Something I Don't Know (game show), a radio game show produced by Stephen Dubner and the New York Times
