= Force Theory =

Force Theory was a musical production team and performance art band from Fort Greene, Brooklyn.

== Force Theory Productions ==
Force Theory Productions was formed in 2004 by bandmates Ion Michael Furjanic and Neill Sanford Livingston. The partnership are best known for composing and sound designing independent documentaries.

In 2005, Force Theory composed and sound designed the film Favela Rising, which won 24 international film festivals and was short-listed for the Academy Awards. The team went on to score and sound design the film Jesus Camp by Heidi Ewing and Rachel Grady, which was released theatrically by Magnolia Pictures and was nominated for the 2007 best documentary Academy Award. In late 2007, Force Theory added 7 songs to Manda Bala (Send a Bullet) by Jason Kohn, which won the grand jury prize for documentary at the Sundance Film Festival.

Their later work included composition and sound design on director Marjan Tehrani's Arusi: Persian Wedding (PBS, 2009) and a complete sound design for Benson Lee's Planet B-Boy, which aired on MTV in January 2009. They have also composed and sound designed the film Toe to Toe which premiered at the 2009 Sundance film festival in the dramatic competition.

=== Force Theory Productions members ===
- Ion Michael Furjanic
- Neill Sanford Livingston

== Force Theory Band ==
The Force Theory Performance Band was founded in 1997 and played stage shows and private events around the New York City area until 2005. The Band was made up primarily of students from New York University. The band's music was a blend of Funk and Electronic. The lead vocals were provided by "Ionic", "Rai"(pronounced Ray) and Master of ceremonies "Mike Noise". The band usually played a 1-hour non-stop set produced by "Sanford" and "Ionic". Their stage shows were known for frenetic choreography, props and inventions. The band claims to never have performed the same show twice.

Ion ("Ionic") of the band developed the "human piano" installation which uses low level electricity to put sound into a person, who is then attached to a speaker system to amplify the sound.

The band's name was derived from the Unified Force Theory.

== Original members ==
- Ionic (Ion Michael Furjanic - vocals, production, human piano)
- Neill (Sanford Livingston - production, bass, cello)
- Rai (Renee Benson - vocals, choreography)
- Sosa (Sam Albright - horns, synth)
- Mike Noise (Nora Woolley - emcee, movement)
