= Endangered (2022 film) =

2022 documentary film directed by Rachel Grady and Heidi Ewing

- Directed by: Rachel Grady; Heidi Ewing
- Produced by: Alex Takats
- Production companies: Loki Films; Ronan Production Group
- Distributed by: HBO Max
- Release date: 2022
- Country: United States
- Language: English

Endangered is a 2022 documentary film directed by Rachel Grady and Heidi Ewing. It details threats against journalists in the United States and around the world. The film features Brazil's Patrícia Campos Mello, Mexico's Sashenka Gutierrez, the United States' Carl Juste, and the United Kingdom's Oliver Laughland (reporting from the United States).

== Reception ==
On the review aggregator website Rotten Tomatoes, 100% of 14 critics' reviews are positive, with an average rating of 8.10/10.

=== Accolades ===
Award	Date of ceremony	Category	Recipient(s)	Result	Ref.
IDA Documentary Awards	December 10, 2022	Best TV Feature Documentary or Mini-Series	Endangered	Nominated	
Hollywood Professional Association Awards	November 17, 2022	Outstanding Sound - Documentary/Nonfiction	Lewis Goldstein, Bennett Kerr, Jerrell Suelto, Linzy Elliott, and Alfred DeGrand	Nominated	
