= Freakonomics Radio =

American public radio program

- Running time: Variable
- Syndicates: WNYC Studios (radio); Stitcher (podcast)
- Hosted by: Stephen Dubner
- Created by: Stephen Dubner and Steven Levitt
- Original release: June 1, 2009
- No. of series: 5 (as of September 2014)
- No. of episodes: 618 (as of 22 January 2025)
- Website: freakonomics.com

Freakonomics Radio is an American podcast and public radio program which covers the world through the lens of economics and social science. While the network, as of 2023, includes three programs, the primary podcast is also named Freakonomics Radio and is a spin-off of the 2005 book Freakonomics. Journalist Stephen Dubner hosts the show, with economist Steven Levitt as a regular guest as of 2015, both of whom co-wrote the book of the same name. The show is primarily distributed as a podcast, and is among the most popular on Apple Podcasts, formerly iTunes.

== History ==
Freakonomics Radio was created in September 2010. Starting in July 2018, production moved from WNYC to Stitcher Radio; Freakonomics Radio is released at 11 p.m. on Wednesday each week on podcast aggregators such as Apple Podcasts, Spotify, Google Podcasts, as well as on the Freakonomics website.

From November 16, 2016, until November 12, 2017, Freakonomics Radio produced episodes of “live journalism wrapped in a game show” called Tell Me Something I Don’t Know.

In November 2022, the Freakonomics podcast looked at whether Google searches were getting worse. The episode featured former Google executive Marissa Mayer.

In February 2023, Freakonomics Radio Network announced a deal with YouTube to bring its podcasts to the video platform.

== Podcasts ==
As of 2023, the Freakonomics Radio Network produces the following podcasts:

- Freakonomics Radio, with Dubner.
- People I (Mostly) Admire, with Levitt.
- The Economics of Everyday Things, with journalist Zachary Crockett.

Former programs include:

- No Stupid Questions, with Dubner and Angela Duckworth. Dubner was replaced by Mike Maughan in later episodes.
- Freakonomics, M.D. with Dr. Bapu Jena.
- Tell Me Something I Don't Know
- Sudhir Breaks the Internet, with sociologist Sudhir Venkatesh.
- Footy for Two, with Dubner and his son Solomon.
- Question of the Day, with Dubner and James Altucher.
