= Ken Caldeira =

American scientist (born 1960)

- Born: 1960 (age 65–66)
- Education: New York University (PhD)
- Scientific career
- Fields: Climate change; Biogeochemical cycles; Sustainable energy; Environment; Ocean acidification
- Workplaces: Carnegie Institution for Science; Stanford University; Breakthrough Energy
- Website: globalecology.stanford.edu/labs/caldeiralab

Kenneth Caldeira (born 1960) is an American atmospheric scientist. His areas of research include ocean acidification, climate effects of trees, intentional climate modification, interactions in the global carbon cycle/climate system, and sustainable energy.

As of 2021, Caldeira is Senior Scientist in the energy research company Breakthrough Energy, Senior Staff Scientist (emeritus) in the Carnegie Institution for Science's Department of Global Ecology, and Professor (by courtesy) in the Stanford University Department of Earth System Sciences.

== Early life and education ==
In the 1980s, Caldeira worked as a software developer. He received his Ph.D. in Atmospheric Sciences in 1991 from the New York University Department of Applied Science. From 1991 to 1993, Caldeira worked at Penn State University as a post-doctoral researcher. He then worked as an Environmental Scientist and Physicist at Lawrence Livermore National Laboratory until 2005.

== Climate change research ==
In 2005, Caldeira joined the Carnegie Institution for Science Department of Global Ecology as a senior scientist, where his job is "to make important scientific discoveries." He also serves as a Professor (by courtesy) in the Stanford University Department of Earth System Science.

Caldeira served as a member of the committee producing the 2015 U.S. National Academy of Sciences report Geoengineering Climate: Technical Evaluation and Discussion of Impacts.

He was a contributing author to the Intergovernmental Panel on Climate Change (IPCC) AR5 report Climate Change 2013: The Physical Science Basis. In 2010, he was a co-author of the 2010 US National Academy America's Climate Choices report He participated in the UK Royal Society geoengineering panel in 2009 and ocean acidification panel in 2005. Caldeira was coordinating lead author of the oceans chapter for the 2005 IPCC report on Carbon Capture and Storage.

In 2007, Caldeira began advising Bill Gates on climate change and energy issues. In his 2016 end-of-year blog post, Gates referred to Caldeira as "my amazing teacher". In 2021, Caldeira began working for the energy research company Breakthrough Energy, which was founded by Gates.

== Press ==
Caldeira's work was featured in a 14 May 2012 article in The New Yorker, entitled "The Climate Fixers" and in a 20 November 2006 article in The New Yorker, entitled "The Darkening Sea." In 2007, he contributed two op-ed pieces on the subject of global warming to The New York Times.

In response to the controversy caused by the book SuperFreakonomics over Caldeira's view on climate engineering, Caldeira rejected the suggestion that he had said, "Carbon dioxide is not the right villain". He responded by posting on his website, "Carbon dioxide is the right villain...insofar as inanimate objects can be villains." He said that while the other statements attributed to him by authors Steven Levitt and Stephen Dubner are "based in fact", the casual reader could come up with a misimpression of what he [Caldeira] believes.

=== Views ===
In 2011, Caldeira resigned as a lead author of an IPCC AR5 chapter, stating "Again, I think the IPCC has been extremely useful in the past, and I believe the IPCC could be extremely useful in the future. [...] My resignation was made possible because I believe that the chapter team that I was part of was on the right track and doing an excellent job without my contribution. Had I had a scientific criticism of my chapter team, you can be assured that I would have stayed involved. So, my resignation was a vote of confidence in my scientific peers, not a critique."

Caldeira has argued for a policy goal of zero carbon dioxide emissions. In 2005, he said, "If you're talking about mugging little old ladies, you don't say, 'What's our target for the rate of mugging little old ladies?' You say, 'Mugging little old ladies is bad, and we're going to try to eliminate it.' You recognize you might not be a hundred per cent successful, but your goal is to eliminate the mugging of little old ladies. And I think we need to eventually come around to looking at carbon dioxide emissions the same way.". In 2014, he said, "It is time to stop building things with tailpipes and smokestacks. It is time to stop using the sky as a waste dump for our carbon dioxide pollution."

In 2013, with other leading experts, he was co-author of an open letter to policy makers, which stated that "continued opposition to nuclear power threatens humanity's ability to avoid dangerous climate change."

== Awards and recognition ==
2008 – Hero Scientist of 2008 list, New Scientist magazine

2009 – Number 36 out of 100 Agents of Change in Rolling Stone magazine

2010 – Fellow of the American Geophysical Union
