= Think Like a Freak =

2014 book by Steven Levitt and Stephen J. Dubner

Think Like a Freak The Authors of Freakonomics Offer to Retrain Your Brain
- Hardcover edition
- Author: Steven D. Levitt; Stephen J. Dubner
- Language: English
- Subject: Economics, sociology
- Genre: Non-fiction
- Publisher: William Morrow
- Publication date: May 12, 2014
- Publication place: United States
- Media type: Print, e-book, audiobook
- Pages: 288 pp (hardback edition)
- ISBN: 978-0062218339
- OCLC: 870699040
- Preceded by: SuperFreakonomics
- Followed by: When to Rob a Bank

Think Like a Freak: The Authors of Freakonomics Offer to Retrain Your Brain is the third non-fiction book by University of Chicago economist Steven Levitt and New York Times journalist Stephen J. Dubner. The book was published on May 12, 2014, by William Morrow.

== Synopsis ==
The introduction states that one should avoid preconceived notions and prejudices when approaching societal issues and related questions. The examples given include the controversial study of Robin Goldstein of an experiment that he conducted in which 500 subjects, in a blind taste test, preferred cheaper to more expensive wine.

The first chapter, entitled What Does It Mean to Think like a Freak?, explains the premise of the book. It gives examples including penalty kick tactics and concludes with the authors recounting a meeting with David Cameron before he became prime minister of the United Kingdom.

The second chapter discusses the difficulty that people have in admitting "I don't know". This chapter has a discussion of the wine tasting studies by Robin Goldstein.

The third chapter explains the importance of asking the correct questions to gain knowledge on a situation. By asking the wrong questions, it is unlikely to get the answer one is seeking to a problem. The main example in this chapter discusses Takeru Kobayashi's experiences in competitive eating, specifically how he redefined the approach to hot dog eating contests.

The fourth chapter discusses the importance of approaching a problem from a new angle, and why it is so rare for people to deviate from societal norms and use a new tactic. This chapter discusses popular approaches to current issues such as poverty.

The fifth chapter explores the concept of "thinking like a child," or looking at the smaller things and not fearing the obvious. This chapter addresses how viewing the world with a simpler lens is almost always frowned upon and how smaller questions are often left unexplored because they are deemed too obvious or mediocre. Levitt and Dubner also remind the reader the importance of having fun in what we do, especially in work environments. A prominent example in this chapter is why people partake in the lottery and gambling for fun, even though it is often not profitable.

The sixth chapter explores the power of incentive.

The seventh chapter discusses how to let problems sort themselves out using the principle of a "self weeding garden" and a multitude of ways people tricked others into revealing their true intentions. The chapter uses a multitude of examples, such as explaining the logic behind the story of King Solomon and his threat to chop a baby in half and David Lee Roth's pickiness over brown M&M's.

The eighth chapter explains how to persuade people who do not want to be persuaded. This chapter outlines clear steps on how to build an argument that may sway someone else's opinions. This chapter uses the example of how over the course of reading the book, the reader was being convinced by the stories and examples used in every chapter.

The ninth chapter explains the upside of quitting and three reasons why people have so much difficulty quitting. Firstly, quitting is frowned upon in society. Secondly, it is often difficult to justify abandoning a project after putting so much time, money, and effort used in an effort to achieve success, also known as the "sunk cost fallacy." Lastly, when struggling to salvage a losing proposition other opportunities are often left unseen or diminished in comparison to the failing project. According to Levitt and Dubner, quitting a failing project and freeing one's time up for other opportunities is not being a quitter; it's being a realist.

== Criticism ==
The title of their new book, the third in the series, is evidence of the falling off. Gone is the economics part of the equation. Now it's simply about thinking like a Freak. But without the hardcore economics, thinking like a Freak just means being willing to think outside the box, and there are plenty of people doing that already. Too much of this book is taken up with routine problem-solving advice and over-familiar stories repackaged by Dubner as though they were revelations.

—David Runciman, The Guardian
