= Folktales (film) =

2025 American-Norwegian documentary film

- Theatrical release poster
- Directed by: Heidi Ewing; Rachel Grady
- Produced by: Heidi Ewing; Rachel Grady
- Cinematography: Lars Erlend Tubaas Øymo; Tor Edvin Eliassen
- Edited by: Nathan Punwar
- Music by: T. Griffin
- Production companies: Loki Films; Impact Partners; Topic Studios; Fifth Season; Artemis Rising Foundation; Fuglene
- Distributed by: Magnolia Pictures
- Release dates: January 25, 2025 (Sundance); July 25, 2025 (United States)
- Running time: 106 minutes
- Countries: United States; Norway
- Languages: English; Norwegian
- Box office: $129,358

Folktales is a 2025 documentary film, directed and produced by Heidi Ewing and Rachel Grady. It follows teenagers at a folk high school in Norway, where they must rely on each other and a pack of sled dogs as they grow.

It had its world premiere at the Sundance Film Festival on January 25, 2025, and was released in the United States on July 25, 2025, by Magnolia Pictures.

== Premise ==
Teenagers at a folk high school in Norway, where they must rely on each other and a pack of sled dogs as they grow.

== Production ==
Heidi Ewing and Rachel Grady wanted to make a documentary revolving around Folk high school in Norway, feeling the process was cinematic. The two visited five schools before settling on Pasvik Folk High School, with production commencing during the school year from August to May.

== Release ==
It had its world premiere at the Sundance Film Festival on January 25, 2025. In April 2025, Magnolia Pictures acquired distribution rights to the film, and released it on July 25, 2025.

== Reception ==
On the review aggregator website Rotten Tomatoes, 85% of 53 critics' reviews are positive. The website's consensus reads: "Folktales may skim the surface of its subjects' growing pains, but is most resonant in its heartwarmingly pleasant, canine-abundant exterior." Metacritic, which uses a weighted average, assigned the film a score of 73 out of 100, based on 18 critics, indicating "generally favorable" reviews.
