= 12th & Delaware =

2010 American documentary film

- Directed by: Rachel Grady; Heidi Ewing
- Produced by: Rachel Grady; Heidi Ewing
- Cinematography: Kat Patterson
- Edited by: Enat Sidi
- Music by: David Darling
- Production company: Loki Films
- Distributed by: HBO Documentary Films
- Release date: January 24, 2010 (Sundance)
- Running time: 80 minutes
- Country: United States
- Language: English

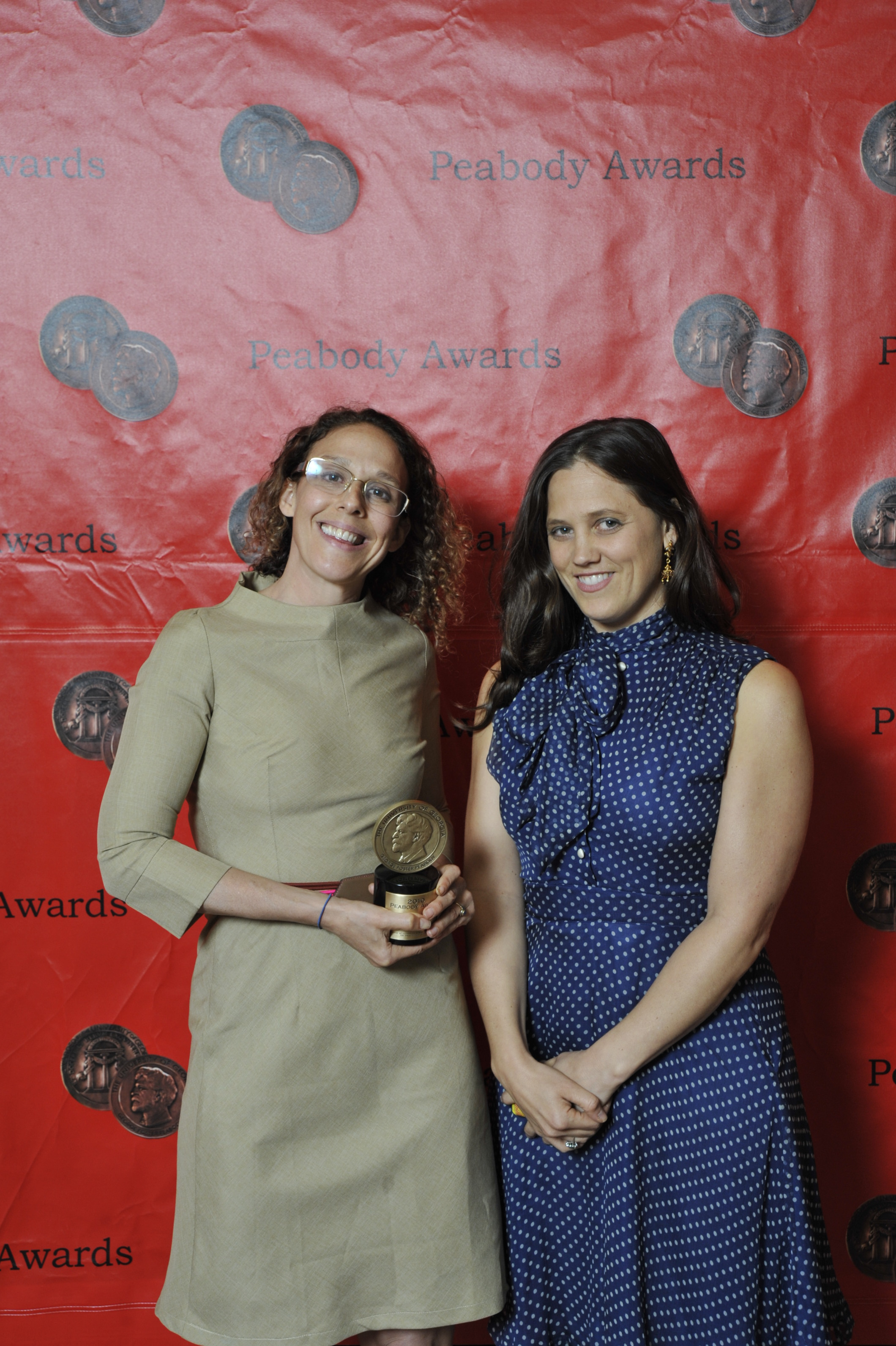
Rachel Grady and Heidi Ewing at the 70th Annual Peabody Awards

12th & Delaware is a 2010 American documentary film set in a crisis pregnancy center (named Pregnancy Care Center) and an abortion clinic (named A Woman's World Medical Center) across the street from it in Fort Pierce, Florida. The film was produced and filmed by Rachel Grady and Heidi Ewing and covers the center and its patients over the period of a year. The film shows interviews of staff at both facilities, as well as pregnant women who are going to them. 12th & Delaware premiered on January 24, 2010, at the 2010 Sundance Film Festival in the U.S. Documentary Competition. It won a Peabody Award that same year "for its poignant portrait of women facing exceedingly difficult decisions at a literal intersection of opposing ideologies."

One of the interviewees was president of the Pregnancy Care Centre, Father Thomas J. Euteneuer. In January 2011, Euteneuer issued a statement disclosing that he had "violat[ed] the boundaries of chastity with an adult female ... I take full responsibility for my own poor judgment, my weakness and my sinful conduct that resulted from it". and then in June 2012, it was reported that a woman had filed a lawsuit accusing Euteneuer of sexual abuse during what were supposed to be exorcisms.
