= Gang Leader for a Day =

Book by Sudhir Alladi Venkatesh

Gang Leader for a Day: A Rogue Sociologist Takes to the Streets
- First edition
- Author: Sudhir Venkatesh
- Language: English
- Genre: Biographies
- Publisher: Penguin Press
- Publication date: January 14, 2008
- Publication place: United States
- Media type: Print
- Pages: 288 pp.
- ISBN: 978-1-59420-150-9

Gang Leader for a Day: A Rogue Sociologist Takes to the Streets is a memoir written by Sudhir Venkatesh. The book chronicles the life of the urban poor and explores Venkatesh's views on poverty, money, gangs, drugs, and life in Chicago. In 2017, it was reported that AMC Networks would be developing a drama series adapted from the book.

== Summary ==
Gang Leader for a Day recounts the day-to-day life of the urban poor, in which Sudhir Venkatesh, a sociology graduate student, headed to Robert Taylor Homes.

His nearly decade-long research yielded valuable data, revealing the corporation-like workings of the street level drug trade, and serving as the basis of this book.

The book is written as a first person narrative and incorporates some of the stylistic traits of fiction. The book begins with Sudhir's description of a crack den. The narrative then moves back in time, as we learn how Sudhir came to study the residents of Robert Taylor Homes. We learn that Sudhir was studying at the University of Chicago under Professor William Julius Wilson. After seeing the census figures for the surrounding area, Sudhir decided to take a questionnaire into a housing project run by The Black Kings, a Chicago street gang. He met the leader of one of the gang's sub groups, who advised him to adopt more qualitative research techniques and invited Sudhir to observe his lifestyle. Sudhir observed JT's life managing a drug-dealing business. Throughout the book, JT shows Sudhir around his gang's territory and introduces Sudhir to different members of the community. Sudhir discovers a complex community, often more cohesive and nurturing than the predominantly white community he grew up in, but deeply affected by racism and poverty. Sudhir slowly becomes accepted into the community and meets some of its key members—both male and female.

== Reception ==
Gang Leader for a Day has garnered reviews from The New York Times, The Guardian, The Wall Street Journal, Chicago Tribune, and Entertainment Weekly. The book was also Mark Zuckerberg's third selection in his 2015 "Year of Books".
