= Tell Me Something I Don't Know (game show) =

American radio game show

Tell Me Something I Don't Know (abbreviated as TMSIDK) is a radio game show hosted by Stephen Dubner. The show's pilot episode premiered on Freakonomics Radio, Dubner's economics program for WNYC. Envisioned as a game show turned inside-out, TMSIDK's contestants offer facts that they already know instead of trying to answer trivia questions found on traditional quiz shows. These "IDK's" (short for "I Don't Know") are then judged by the audience on three criteria of it being something that the show's hosts did not know, that it was worth knowing, and that it was demonstrably true.

== History ==
=== Pilot and first season ===
Tell Me Something I Don't Know first aired as a special episode of the WNYC program Freakonomics Radio in October 2014. Formatted as a live game show, each contestant posited a question or problem for judges Malcolm Gladwell, Ana Gasteyer and David Paterson to answer of figure out. Upon revealing the fact, TMSIDK fact-checker Jody Avirgan verified the credibility of each "I Don't Know"—or "IDK"—for judges to rate based on the three criteria of it being something that they did not know, something worth knowing, and also being demonstrably true. From these scores, three finalists were whittled from the show's six contestants, and each was paired with one of the judges for the show's final round in which the Wheel of Maximum Danger was spun to determine various topics. Each pair of contestants then had two minutes to come up with an IDK, and the audience made the call as to who was the show's ultimate winner.

The pilot was rebroadcast in May 2015 and Freakonomics solicited feedback from its audience in order to produce TMSIDK as its own show. Shortly thereafter, Earwolf launched Dubner's Quora-inspired podcast Question of the Day with co-host James Altucher that ran until September 2016, after which the premiere of Tell Me Something I Don't Know was announced. Season 1 ran in November and December 2016 and was coproduced by The New York Times. The show's first season maintained the pilot's format of pre-selected audience contestants presenting their IDK's to a panel of celebrities and experts from business, the arts, science, politics, sports, and academia, but with less emphasis on the panelists' scoring system. The format of the final round was also modified and the Wheel of Maximum Danger's 12 topics were designated as subcategories of the show's main theme. This final round was altered a few times throughout the first season: most episodes paired each panelist with one of the top three contestants, one episode organized panelists and audience winners into two separate teams, and another episode had only the panelists competing in the final round. Episode 5 temporarily renamed the Wheel of Maximum Danger as "the Wheel of Perpetual Agony." The wheel did not return for subsequent seasons.

=== Season 2 ===
Season 2 ran February through May 2017 and featured broadcasts recorded in Washington D.C. as well as New York. For the entire season, one of five contestants was chosen as winner of the first round by the three panelists. As in Season 1, the final round's process varied from episode to episode. For the first five of the season's 10 episodes the four audience runners-up each received a Certificate of Impressive Knowledge while the winner received a prize associated with the IDK from the top of the show and went on to play a "Reference Round" along with the three panelists. For the Reference Round, each person was handed a reference book, such as the Oxford English Dictionary, Journal of Sports Economics, a list of patents granted by the United States Patent and Trademark Office, or a volume of the Encyclopedia Britannica, from which they derived their final IDK. From this round the audience chose two winners who were given a single topic for an IDK and the audience then chose the final winner. For Episodes 6 through 8, only the first round's audience winner was given a Certificate of Impressive Knowledge and the Reference Round was played solely by the panelists so that the final round always faced a panelist off with an audience member. Episode 9 replaced the Reference Round with a lightning round of questions individually tailored to each panelist, and Episode 10's panelist round required each one to sing a meaningful song from childhood with live musical accompaniment by Dan Zanes and Friends.

=== Season 3 ===
Season 3 promised "more twists and turns to the game play" and ran from June to August 2017 with broadcasts recorded in Chicago, Boston, Minneapolis, Philadelphia and New York City. The season started out maintaining Season 2's three-round structure and returned to the policy of giving every audience contestant a Certificate of Impressive Knowledge while adopting the personalized question model for the panelist round. For the season's last three episodes the show's format was simplified in response to listener feedback. TMSIDK's producers eliminated the panel of judges and Stephen Dubner was instead joined only by a co-host and the show's fact-checker. Time was allotted for more audience contestants to share their IDK's, and Dubner, co-host and fact-checker each weighed in on the show's three requisite criteria before turning the final say to the audience to pick a single winner. The IDK at the top of the show was also removed and the only prize given became one Certificate of Impressive Knowledge to each week's winner. This format continued into Season 4, which began in September of 2017 with co-production from the podcasting platform Stitcher. In between seasons Tell Me Something I Don't Know ran a mini-season of short-form versions of the podcast, released daily in August 2017. Recorded in the studio without a live audience, these episodes cut the program's game show format, each focusing on a single IDK from a celebrity call-in guest.

=== Season 4 ===
In October 2018 Dubner announced that season 4 would no longer appear in its own podcast feed but be collapsed into Freakonomics Radio’s stream. Dubner also announced a sponsorship deal with Stitcher that would allow paid subscribers to access content in advance of the show's wider release.
