= Melissa Lafsky =

American writer (born 1979)

Melissa Lafsky Wall (born 1978) is an American writer and entrepreneur. She began her career as a writer by founding the Opinionistas blog, which focused on the dehumanizing aspects of working at large law firms. She then entered digital journalism, writing for media brands like The Huffington Post Newsweek and The New York Times. She then moved to Silicon Valley and worked in AI startups.

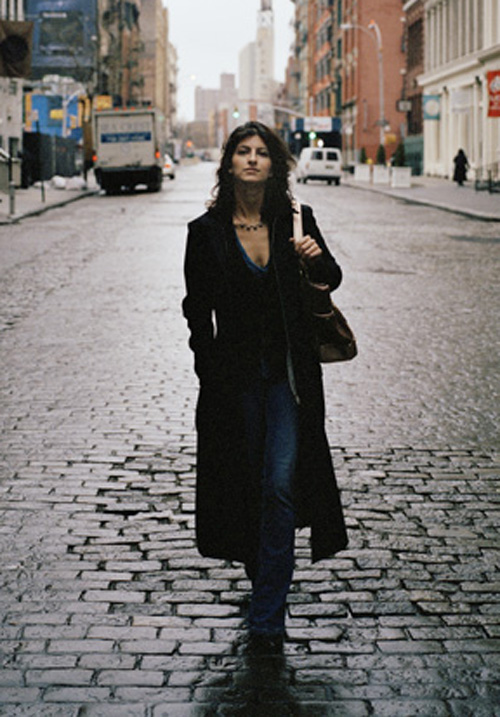
Founder and writer Melissa Lafsky

== Education and legal career ==
Lafsky began writing Opinionistas anonymously while working as a junior associate at a law firm in New York City. After her blog was discovered by Gawker in April 2005, it gained a profile and was covered by The New York Times. She then resigned her law firm position in December 2005 to pursue a career in writing, and revealed her identity to the New York Observer in January 2006.

== Writing and editorial career ==
Lafsky has written for publications including The New York Times, the New York Post, Wired, the New York Observer and The Christian Science Monitor. She spent a year as a contributor and then associate editor at The Huffington Post, and was hired as editor of the Freakonomics blog, which features content by the authors of the internationally best-selling book. Freakonomics.com then became part of The New York Times Online.

In August 2009, following the death of Ted Kennedy, she wrote a controversial article about the Chappaquiddick incident, in which she speculated that the victim of that incident, Mary Jo Kopechne, might have felt that the injustice of Kennedy's not facing jail time was "worth it" because it spurred Kennedy's later social justice work. The comment was attacked by the conservative media. Rush Limbaugh said on his show that it meant that "liberal young women like to die for the cause of advancing Kennedys' careers." Lafsky responded by criticizing the right wing media for using out-of-context soundbites to stir up controversy.

In 2011, she became editor of the Newsweek's iPad edition. It launched in January 2012 to positive reviews.

== Silicon Valley career ==
In 2016 she began working with Silicon Valley companies. She worked with Facebook to launch the first Facebook Communities Summit in June 2017, in which Mark Zuckerberg announced that the company was changing its mission. She also helped launch the first Facebook Social Good Forum in which Facebook highlighted its social impact work. She then turned to cryptocurrency, writing a popular post for Medium about women in crypto.

In 2020 she joined the founding team of a startup that provided advanced AI solutions for banks, fintechs and other lenders, "to reduce algorithmic bias for people of color, women, and other historically disadvantaged groups".

== Trauma Advocacy ==
In 2025 she began sharing her personal story of losing her first child during labor in 2014.
