= Stephen J. Dubner =

American author, journalist, and podcast host

Stephen Dubner
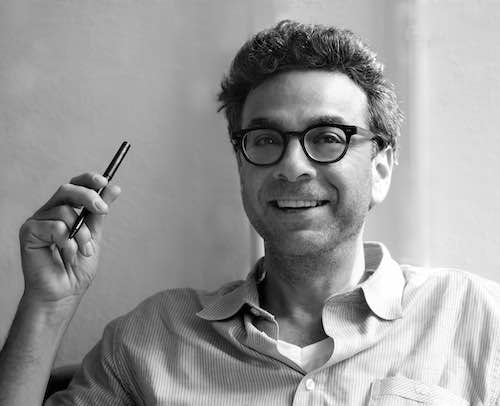
- Stephen Dubner in 2012
- Born: Stephen Joseph Dubner; August 26, 1963 (age 63); Duanesburg, New York, U.S.
- Education: Appalachian State University (BA); Columbia University (MFA)
- Occupation: Journalist
- Known for: Freakonomics; SuperFreakonomics; Think Like a Freak; When to Rob a Bank; Freakonomics Radio
- Spouses: Abigail Seymour (divorced); Ellen Binder (m. 1998)
- Children: 2
- Awards: Quill Award (2005)
- Website: freakonomics.com/about

Stephen Joseph Dubner (born August 26, 1963) is an American author, journalist, and podcast and radio host. He is co-author of the popular Freakonomics book series: Freakonomics, SuperFreakonomics, Think Like a Freak and When to Rob a Bank. He is the host of Freakonomics Radio.

== Early life and education ==
Born in 1963 in Duanesburg, New York, to Solomon Dubner (also known as Paul) and Florence Greenglass (also known as Florence Winters and Veronica Dubner), Dubner grew up as the youngest of eight children. His father, who died in 1973 when Dubner was 10 years old, worked as a copy editor at The Record in Troy, New York. Dubner grew up in a devout Roman Catholic household, his parents having converted from Judaism to Catholicism before his birth. As an adult, Dubner himself converted back to Judaism, an experience he chronicles in his first book, Turbulent Souls: A Catholic Son's Return to His Jewish Family.

Dubner completed his high school education at Duanesburg Central High School in 1980, a year ahead of his graduating class. In 1984, he graduated from Appalachian State University in North Carolina, where he studied in the College of Fine and Applied Arts. There, Dubner played in a rock band, The Right Profile, which later signed with Arista Records shortly before he decided against a career in music. In 1990, Dubner earned a Master of Fine Arts degree in writing from Columbia University, where he also taught English.

== Career ==
Dubner's first published work appeared in Highlights for Children, when he was 11 years old. Since then, his journalism has been published in The New York Times, The New Yorker, and Time, and has been anthologized in The Best American Sports Writing, The Best American Crime Writing, and elsewhere.

In 1998, Dubner wrote his first full-length book, Turbulent Souls: A Catholic Son's Return to His Jewish Family, for which he was named a finalist for the Koret Jewish Book Award. Dubner has since written Confessions of a Hero-Worshiper, and a children's book, The Boy With Two Belly Buttons.

=== Books ===
Dubner met Steven Levitt, a professor of economics at the University of Chicago, when his editor asked him to write a profile on Levitt for The New York Times Magazine. At the time, Dubner was writing a book on the psychology of money and didn't have much interest in meeting the young economist from Chicago. Likewise, Levitt had little interest in the profile, but agreed to a two-hour interview because his mom liked The New York Times Magazine. Upon meeting Levitt, Dubner extended the two-hour interview to three days.

After publication of Dubner's 2003 Times Magazine article, Dubner and Levitt were asked to co-write a book, which cemented their partnership. In 2005, William Morrow and Company published Freakonomics, a book about cheating teachers, bizarre baby-names, self-dealing realtors, and crack-selling mama's boys. Freakonomics would go on to be translated into 40 languages and sell 5 million copies worldwide.

Dubner and Levitt have co-authored three other books: SuperFreakonomics, Think Like a Freak, and When to Rob a Bank. Throughout their work, Dubner and Levitt use economics to explore real-world phenomena, answer perplexing questions, and offer unconventional analysis.

Dubner has a chapter giving advice in Tim Ferriss' book Tools of Titans.

=== Radio ===
In 2010, Dubner launched a weekly podcast, Freakonomics Radio, which was getting 15 million global monthly downloads as of 2018. On March 5, 2020, Dubner appeared on the Joe Rogan Experience podcast.

Dubner also hosts occasional episodes of Freakonomics Radio Live, a live version of his Freakonomics podcast.

Other shows include:

- Tell Me Something I Don't Know was a game-show podcast that Dubner created in partnership with The New York Times that ran from 2016 to 2018.
- Footy for Two was a podcast produced from 2016 to 2018 by Stephen Dubner and his son, Solomon Dubner, in which Solomon educated his father on the politics, personalities, and news of international football.
- No Stupid Questions is podcast that is part of Freakonomics Radio that was co-founded in 2020 by Dubner and Angela Duckworth. In mid 2023, Dubner stepped away from his co-host role and was replaced by Mike Maughan.

A film called Freakonomics: The Movie was released in 2010.

=== Awards and honors ===
- Finalist for the Koret Jewish Book Award, for Turbulent Souls
- Quill Award, for Freakonomics
- Short-listed for Financial Times and Goldman Sachs Business Book of the Year Award

== Personal life ==
As of June 2023, Dubner resides in New York City with his wife, documentary photographer Ellen Binder, their two children, and their dog. In a 2017 New York Times profile, Dubner described his ideal Sunday as one in which he walks his dog in Central Park early in the morning, watches an FC Barcelona game with his son, and spends the afternoon cooking dinner with his daughter.
