= Freakonomics =

2005 nonfiction book

Freakonomics: A Rogue Economist Explores the Hidden Side of Everything
- Hardcover edition
- Author: Steven D. Levitt; Stephen J. Dubner
- Language: English
- Subject: Economics, sociology
- Publisher: William Morrow
- Publication date: April 12, 2005
- Publication place: United States
- Media type: Hardback and paperback
- Pages: 336 pp (hardback edition)
- ISBN: 0-06-123400-1 (hardback), ISBN 0-06-089637-X (large print paperback)
- OCLC: 73307236
- Followed by: SuperFreakonomics

Freakonomics: A Rogue Economist Explores the Hidden Side of Everything is the debut non-fiction book by University of Chicago economist Steven Levitt and New York Times journalist Stephen J. Dubner. Published on April 12, 2005, by William Morrow, the book has been described as melding pop culture with economics. By late 2009, the book had sold over 4 million copies worldwide. Based on the success of the original book, Levitt and Dubner have grown the Freakonomics brand into a multi-media franchise, with a sequel book, a feature film, a regular radio segment (now a podcast) on National Public Radio, and a weekly blog.

== Overview ==
The book is a collection of articles written by Levitt, an economist who had gained a reputation for applying economic theory to diverse subjects not usually covered by "traditional" economists. In Freakonomics, Levitt and Dubner argue that economics is, at its roots, the study of incentives. The book's chapters cover:

- Chapter 1: Discovering cheating as applied to teachers and sumo wrestlers, as well as a typical Washington, D.C.–area bagel business and its customers
- Chapter 2: Information asymmetry as applied to the Ku Klux Klan and real-estate agents
- Chapter 3: The economics of drug dealing, including the surprisingly low earnings and abject working conditions of crack cocaine dealers in Chicago
- Chapter 4: The role legalized abortion has played in reducing crime, contrasted with the policies and downfall of Romanian dictator Nicolae Ceauşescu (Levitt explored this topic in an earlier paper entitled "The Impact of Legalized Abortion on Crime", written with John Donohue)
- Chapter 5: The negligible effects of good parenting on education
- Chapter 6: The socioeconomic patterns of naming children (nominative determinism)

One example of the authors' use of economic theory involves demonstrating the existence of cheating among sumo wrestlers. In a sumo tournament, all wrestlers in the top division compete in 15 matches and face demotion if they do not win at least eight of them. The sumo community is very close-knit, and the wrestlers at the top levels tend to know each other well. The authors looked at the final match, and considered the case of a wrestler with seven wins, seven losses, and one fight to go, fighting against an 8–6 wrestler. Statistically, the 7–7 wrestler should have a slightly below even chance, since the 8–6 wrestler is slightly better. However, the 7–7 wrestler actually wins around 80% of the time. Levitt uses this statistic and other data gleaned from sumo wrestling matches, along with the effect that allegations of corruption have on match results, to conclude that those who already have eight wins collude with those who are 7–7 and let them win, since they have already secured their position for the following tournament. Following condemnation of the claims by the Japan Sumo Association, the 2011 Grand Tournament in Tokyo was canceled- the first time since 1946 -due to allegations of match-fixing.

The authors attempt to demonstrate the power of data mining, as a number of their results emerge from Levitt's analysis of various databases. The authors posit that various incentives encourage teachers to cheat by assisting their students with multiple-choice high-stakes tests. Such cheating in the Chicago school system is inferred from detailed analysis of students' answers to multiple-choice questions. Levitt asks, "What would the pattern of answers look like if the teacher cheated?", and hypothesizes that the more difficult questions found at the end of test sections will be answered correctly more frequently than the easy questions at the beginning of test sections.

=== Second edition ===
In Chapter 2 of Freakonomics, the authors wrote of their visit to folklorist Stetson Kennedy's Florida home where the topic of Kennedy's investigations of the Ku Klux Klan were discussed. However, in their January 8, 2006 column in The New York Times Magazine, Dubner and Levitt wrote of questions about Stetson Kennedy's research ("Hoodwinked", pp. 26–28) leading to the conclusion that Kennedy's research was at times embellished for effectiveness.

In the "Revised and Expanded Edition" this embellishment was noted and corrected: "Several months after Freakonomics was first published, it was brought to our attention that this man's portrayal of his crusade, and various other Klan matters, was considerably overstated ... we felt it was important to set straight the historical record."

== Criticism ==
Freakonomics has been criticized for being a work of sociology or criminology, rather than economics. Israeli economist Ariel Rubinstein criticized the book for making use of dubious statistics and opined that "economists like Levitt ... have swaggered off into other fields," saying that the "connection to economics ... [is] none" and that the book is an example of "academic imperialism." Arnold Kling has suggested the book is an example of "amateur sociology."

=== The impact of legalized abortion on crime ===
Revisiting a question first studied empirically in the 1960s, Donohue and Levitt argue that the legalization of abortion can account for almost half of the reduction in crime witnessed in the 1990s. This paper has sparked much controversy, to which Levitt has said:

The numbers we're talking about, in terms of crime, are absolutely trivial when you compare it to the broader debate on abortion. From a pro-life view of the world: If abortion is murder then we have a million murders a year through abortion. And the few thousand homicides that will be prevented according to our analysis are just nothing—they are a pebble in the ocean relative to the tragedy that is abortion. So, my own view, when we [did] the study and it hasn't changed is that: our study shouldn't change anybody's opinion about whether abortion should be legal and easily available or not. It's really a study about crime, not abortion.

In 2003, Theodore Joyce argued that legalized abortion had little impact on crime, contradicting Donohue and Levitt's results ("Did Legalized Abortion Lower Crime?" Journal of Human Resources, 2003, 38(1), pp. 1–37). In 2004, the authors published a response, in which they argued that Joyce's argument was flawed due to omitted-variable bias.

In November 2005, Federal Reserve Bank of Boston economist Christopher Foote and his research assistant Christopher Goetz published a working paper, in which they argued that the results in Donohue and Levitt's abortion and crime paper were due to statistical errors made by the authors: the omission of state-year interactions and the use of the total number of arrests instead of the arrest rate in explaining changes in the murder rate. When the corrections were made, Foote and Goetz argued that abortion actually increased violent crime instead of decreasing it and did not affect property crime. They even concluded that the majority of women who had abortions in the 1970s were middle-class whites rather than low-income minorities as Levitt stated; this was, they stated, because white middle-class women had the financial means for an abortion. The Economist remarked on the news of the errors that "for someone of Mr Levitt's iconoclasm and ingenuity, technical ineptitude is a much graver charge than moral turpitude. To be politically incorrect is one thing; to be simply incorrect quite another."

In January 2006, Donohue and Levitt published a response, in which they admitted the errors in their original paper but also pointed out Foote and Goetz's correction was flawed due to heavy attenuation bias. The authors argued that, after making necessary changes to fix the original errors, the corrected link between abortion and crime was now weaker but still statistically significant, contrary to Foote and Goetz's claims. Foote and Goetz, however, soon produced a rebuttal of their own and said that even after analyzing the data using the methods that Levitt and Donohue recommend, the data does not show a positive correlation between abortion rates and crime rates. They are quick to point out that this does not necessarily disprove Levitt's thesis, however, and emphasize that with data this messy and incomplete, it is in all likelihood not even possible to prove or disprove Donohue and Levitt's conclusion.

Freakonomics commented on the effects of an abortion ban in Romania (Decree 770), stating that "Compared to Romanian children born just a year earlier, the cohort of children born after the abortion ban would do worse in every measurable way: they would test lower in school, they would have less success in the labor market, and they would also prove much more likely to become criminals. (p. 118)". John DiNardo, a professor at the University of Michigan, retorts that the paper cited by Freakonomics states "virtually the opposite of what is actually claimed":

On average, children born in 1967 just after abortions became illegal display better educational and labor market achievements than children born prior to the change. This outcome can be explained by a change in the composition of women having children: urban, educated women were more likely to have abortions prior to the policy change, so a higher proportion of children were born into urban, educated households. (Pop-Eleches, 2002, p. 34).

— John DiNardo, Freakonomics: Scholarship in the Service of Storytelling

Levitt responded on the Freakonomics Blog that Freakonomics and Pop-Eleches "are saying the same thing":

Here is the abstract of the version of the Pop-Eleches paper that we cited:

...Children born after the abortion ban attained more years of schooling and greater labor market success. This is because urban, educated women were more likely to have abortions prior to the policy change, and the relative number of children born to this type of woman increased after the ban. However, controlling for composition using observable background variables, children born after the ban on abortions had worse educational and labor market achievements as adults. Additionally, I provide evidence of crowding in the school system and some suggestive evidence that cohorts born after the introduction of the abortion ban had higher infant mortality and increased criminal behavior later in life.

The introduction of the Pop-Eleches paper says:

This finding is consistent with the view that children who were unwanted during pregnancy had worse socio-economic outcomes once they became adults.

=== Effects of extra police on crime ===
Freakonomics claimed that it was possible to "tease out" the effect of extra police on crime by analyzing electoral cycles. The evidence behind these claims was shown to be due partly to a programming error. Economist Justin McCrary stated "While municipal police force size does appear to vary over state and local electoral cycles ... elections do not induce enough variation in police hiring to generate informative estimates of the effect of police on crime."

=== Defamation case ===
On April 10, 2006, political activist John Lott filed suit for defamation against Levitt and HarperCollins Publishers over the book and a series of emails to retired economist John B. McCall. In the book, Levitt and coauthor Dubner claimed that the results of Lott's research in More Guns, Less Crime had not been replicated by other academics. In the emails to McCall, who had pointed to a number of papers in different academic publications that had replicated Lott's work, Levitt wrote that the work by authors supporting Lott in a special 2001 issue of The Journal of Law and Economics had not been peer-reviewed, alleged that Lott had paid the University of Chicago Press to publish the papers, and that papers with results opposite of Lott's had been blocked from publication in that issue.

A federal judge found that Levitt's replication claim in Freakonomics was not defamation but found merit in Lott's complaint about the email claims.

Levitt settled the second defamation claim by admitting in a letter to McCall that he himself was a peer reviewer in the 2001 issue of The Journal of Law and Economics, that Lott had not engaged in bribery (paying for extra costs of printing and postage for a conference issue is customary), and that he knew that "scholars with varying opinions" (including Levitt himself) had been invited to participate. The Chronicle of Higher Education characterized Levitt's letter as offering "a doozy of a concession".

The dismissal of the first half of Lott's suit was unanimously upheld by the United States Court of Appeals for the Seventh Circuit on February 11, 2009.

== Publishing history ==
Freakonomics peaked at number two among nonfiction on The New York Times Best Seller list and was named the 2006 Book Sense Book of the Year in the Adult Nonfiction category.

Screen shot of Freakonomics Blog

The success of the book has been partly attributed to the blogosphere. In the campaign prior to the release of the book in April 2005, the publisher (William Morrow and Company) chose to target bloggers in an unusually strategic way, sending galley copies to over a hundred of them, as well as contracting two specialized buzz marketing agencies.

In 2006, the Revised and Expanded Edition of the book was published, with the most significant corrections in the second chapter.

== Progression ==
=== Freakonomics blog ===
The authors started their own Freakonomics blog in 2005. In May 2007, writer and blogger Melissa Lafsky was hired as the full-time editor of the site. In August 2007, the blog was incorporated into The New York Times' web site—the authors had been writing joint columns for The New York Times Magazine since 2004—and the domain Freakonomics.com became a redirect there. In March 2008, Annika Mengisen replaced Lafsky as the blog editor. The Freakonomics blog ended its association with The New York Times on March 1, 2011.

Among the recurrent guest bloggers on the Freakonomics blog are Ian Ayres, Daniel Hamermesh, Eric A. Morris, Sudhir Venkatesh, Justin Wolfers and others.

In 2008, Stephen Dubner asked for questions from the site's readers and then featured them in an extended Q&A on "Best Places to Live" with demographics expert Bert Sperling.

=== SuperFreakonomics ===
In April 2007, co-author Stephen Dubner announced that there would be a sequel to Freakonomics, and that it would contain further writings about street gang culture from Sudhir Venkatesh, as well as a study of the use of money by capuchin monkeys. Dubner said the title would be SuperFreakonomics, and that one topic would be what makes people good at what they do. The book was released in Europe in early October 2009 and in the United States on October 20, 2009.

=== Freakonomics radio ===
In September 2010, Marketplace radio announced the creation of a Freakonomics podcast hosted by Dubner and Levitt. It used to be available on iTunes and aired bi-weekly on NPR, but is now streamed on Apple Podcasts, Spotify, YouTube, the Freakonomics Website, and most major podcast apps

=== Film adaptation ===
In 2010, Chad Troutwine, Chris Romano, and Dan O'Meara produced a documentary film adaptation with a budget of nearly $3 million in an anthology format by directors Seth Gordon, Morgan Spurlock, Alex Gibney, Eugene Jarecki, Rachel Grady, and Heidi Ewing. It was the Closing Night Gala premiere film at the Tribeca Film Festival on April 30, 2010. It was also the Opening Night film at the AFI/Discovery SilverDocs film festival on June 21, 2010. Magnolia Pictures acquired distribution rights for a Fall 2010 release.

Freakonomics: The Movie was released in major cities with a pay what you want pricing offer for selected preview showings. No report of the results has yet been published.

=== Freakonomics Consulting Group ===
In 2009, Levitt co-founded Freakonomics Consulting Group, a business and philanthropy consulting company which became The Greatest Good and is now known as TGG Group. Founding partners include Nobel laureates Daniel Kahneman and Gary Becker, as well as several other prominent economists.
