= Baraka School =

- Laikipia District; Kenya

Information
- Type: Small education program
- Established: 1996
- Closed: 2003
- School district: Baltimore City Public Schools
- Age: 12+

The Baraka School was a small education program that took at-risk 12-year-old boys from the Baltimore public school system to the Kenyan outback for two years to live and study. The school was located in Laikipia District, and the program began in 1996 with funding from the Abell Foundation, a local Baltimore philanthropy.

The program was shut down in 2003 because of security threats. After the 2002 hotel bombing in Mombasa and the 2003 invasion of Iraq, the school administrators decided not to reopen the school.

The school program was featured in the 2005 documentary The Boys of Baraka. The campus has since been transformed into Daraja Academy.

== See also ==
- Education in Kenya
- List of schools in Kenya
