= Microsoft Amalga =

Health enterprise platform

- Original author(s): Washington Hospital Center
- Developer(s): Microsoft Health Solutions Group
- Operating system: Windows Server
- Successor: Caradigm Intelligence Platform
- Website: https://web.archive.org/web/20120101225438/https://www.microsoft.com/en-us/microsofthealth/products/microsoft-amalga.aspx

Microsoft Amalga Unified Intelligence System (formerly known as Azyxxi) was a unified health enterprise platform designed to retrieve and display patient information from many sources, including scanned documents, electrocardiograms, X-rays, MRI scans and other medical imaging procedures, lab results, dictated reports of surgery, as well as patient demographics and contact information.

As of February 2013, Microsoft Amalga was part of a number of health-related products spun-off into a joint-venture with GE Healthcare called Caradigm.

In early 2016, it was reported that Microsoft had sold its stake in Caradigm to GE.

== History ==
Amalga was developed initially as Azyxxi by doctors and researchers at the Washington Hospital Center emergency department in 1996. After heavy adoption, in 2006 it was acquired by the Microsoft Health Solutions Group as part of a plan to enter the fast-growing market for health care information technology. It was adopted at a number of leading hospitals and health systems across America including St Joseph Health System, New York Presbyterian Hospital, Georgetown University Hospital, Johns Hopkins, the Mayo Clinic and five hospitals in the MedStar Health group, a nonprofit network in the Baltimore-Washington, D.C. area.

Amalga was used to tie together many unrelated medical systems using a wide variety of data types in order to provide an immediate, updated composite portrait of the patient's healthcare history. All of Amalga's components were integrated using middleware software that allows the creation of standard approaches and tools to interface with the many software and hardware systems found in hospitals. A physician using Amalga could obtain within seconds a patient's past and present hospital records, medication and allergy lists, lab studies, and views of relevant X-rays, CT Scans, and other clips and images, all organized into one customized format to highlight the most critical information for that user. In clinical use since 1996, Amalga had the ability to manage more than 40 terabytes of data and provide real-time access to more than 12,000 data elements associated with a given patient.

The system was first implemented by the Washington Hospital Center emergency department to reduce average waiting times. It was also used by the District of Columbia Department of Health for management of such mass-casualty incidents as a bioterrorism attack and in a variety of other settings in Arizona, Maryland, and Virginia. The Cleveland Clinic installed the system in a pilot project as an imaging and data integration system. Besides clinical data, Amalga is also designed to collect financial and operational data for hospital administrators.

Amalga ran on Microsoft Windows Server operating system and used SQL Server 2008 as the data store.

At the time of acquisition, Microsoft hired Dr. Craig F. Feied, principal designer of the software, and 40 members of the development team at Washington Hospital Center. Dr. Mark Smith, who helped design the system, remained at Washington Hospital Center as director of the emergency department. Since then, the Amalga team has grown to include 115 members.

As of February 2013, Microsoft Amalga was part of a number of health-related products spun-off into a joint-venture with GE Healthcare called Caradigm. Shortly thereafter, Caradigm announced the "Caradigm Intelligence Platform" as the new brand for Microsoft Amalga, ending the use of the name.

In early 2016, it was reported that Microsoft had sold its stake in Caradigm to GE.

== Amalga HIS ==
Not to be confused with Amalga UIS above, on July 22, 2010, Microsoft announced that it was shutting down operations and sales for Amalga HIS. Chilmark Research reported that "Amalga HIS has only six customers today, and those customers will receive support for the next five years. After that, they will be on their own..."

As for the remnants of Amalga HIS in 2011, Dale Sanders, CIO of the Cayman Island Health Authority stated that "work remains" for Amalga HIS, one drawback of which is its "split personality for data collection at the point of care — orders, problems, medications, and progress notes are orphaned." CIO Sanders found that, after working closely with Microsoft, some of the organizations he consulted "adopted, but the vast majority did not. In the end, we (Northwestern and Microsoft) couldn’t agree on a value proposition for Northwestern, which already had Cerner, Epic, and a data warehouse. There wasn’t any room or need for a product like Amalga."

Brian Eastwood of Health IT Exchange concluded, "If nothing else, Amalga HIS outlasted the Kin."

== See also ==
- Electronic medical record
- Electronic health record
- Health informatics
