= Maria Zuckerman =

American film executive and executive producer

- Occupations: Film executive; Executive producer
- Organization: Fox Entertainment Studios (since 2025)

Maria Zuckerman is an American film and television producer and media executive. She has worked across scripted and non-fiction film, television, and podcasts, and has held leadership roles at HBO and Topic Studios. She won a Primetime Emmy Award for Outstanding Documentary or Nonfiction Series in 2025 for 100 Foot Wave.

== Career ==
=== HBO ===
Zuckerman worked at HBO for approximately two decades and served as senior vice president of HBO Films. During this period she oversaw the development and production of more than 30 films. Projects associated with this time included Bessie, Muhammad Ali’s Greatest Fight, Mike Tyson: Undisputed Truth, Grey Gardens, and Mary and Martha. She has described her early years at HBO as formative to her approach as a producer. She has cited former HBO Films executives Colin Callender and Keri Putnam as mentors and has said that the studio's emphasis on character-driven storytelling influenced her approach to filmmaking.

In 2015, Variety named Zuckerman one of Hollywood's New Leaders in Television.

=== Topic Studios ===
In May 2019, Zuckerman joined Topic Studios as executive vice president. In this role she was involved in the development, financing, and production of films, documentaries, television series, podcasts, and digital programming. In July 2021 she was promoted to president of Topic Studios, where she supervised the development and production of film, television, documentary, and podcast projects.

During her tenure, Topic Studios produced projects for distributors including Netflix, Amazon Prime Video, HBO, Paramount Pictures, and Freeform. The studio also distributed podcasts through platforms including Audible, Spotify, iHeartRadio, and Wondery. Zuckerman stepped down as president of Topic Studios in June 2022.

=== Fox Entertainment Studios ===
In November 2025, Zuckerman signed a first-look producing agreement with Fox Entertainment Studios to develop scripted television series, films, and nonfiction projects.

== Selected productions ==
- 100 Foot Wave – executive producer
- Bessie
- Grey Gardens
