= Teen Missions International =

American nonprofit organization

- Founded: May 7, 1970
- Founder: Robert M. Bland, Bernie Bland, Gayle Will, Jim Person
- Type: 501(c)(3)
- Location: Merritt Island, Florida
- Key people: Steve Petersen, President
- Website: https://teenmissions.org

Teen Missions International (TMI) is an interdenominational Christian mission organization specializing in running short-term mission trips for youth, teenager, and adult participation. The organization was started in 1970 in Ohio and later moved its headquarters to Florida.

== The Lord's Boot Camp ==
"Boot Camp" is a ten-day training period in which teams learn basic construction and evangelism skills, as well as teamwork. TMI's main, and longest running, Boot Camp is based out of Merritt Island Florida.

The Boot Camp is designed to present simulations of the circumstances members may encounter overseas, and thus intentionally utilizes rustic conditions. Members live in tents, use buckets of water to bathe and wash clothes, and wear clothing such as construction boots.

== Mission Trip Age Groups & Program Focus ==
Teen Mission Trips (Ages 13–19 years)

Teen mission trips focus on spiritual and character development in addition to offering work and evangelism assistance to the host mission on the field. The length of Teen mission trips vary slightly depending on location, but they average between 6 and 8 weeks.

== Obstacle Course (The OC) ==
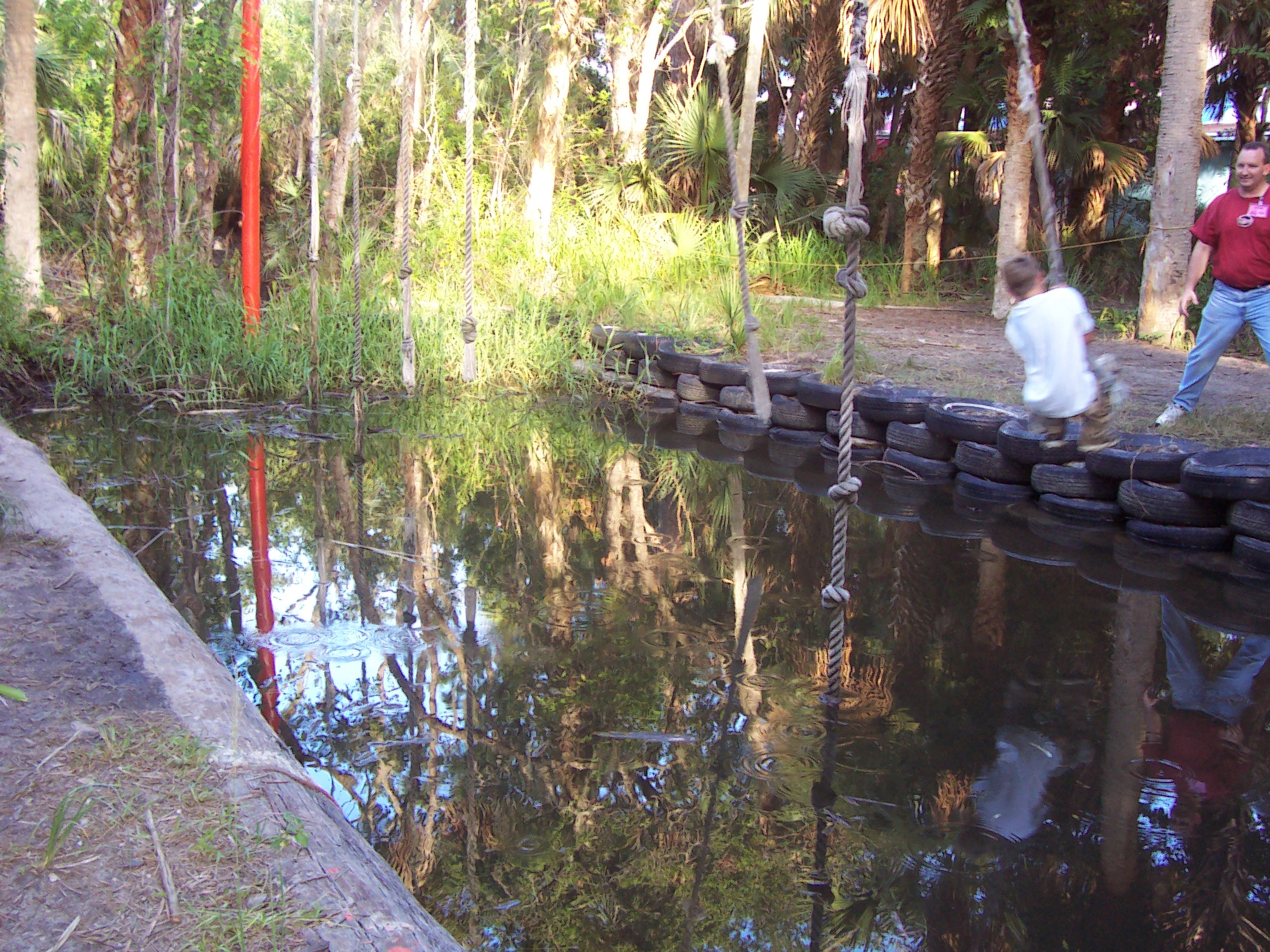
The Slough of Despond. Part of the Obstacle Course.

Teen Missions believes that it is important to send out well trained and unified teams.

To help promote team building, a sense of accomplishment, and reliance on others, teams run an obstacle course during their Boot Camp training. Obstacles include Mount Sinai, (a large mountain formerly made of tires), Jacob's Ladder (a cargo net ladder), The Slough of Despond (a rope swing over a muddy pool of water), and the Wall (a twelve-foot wall that the team must work together to get each member over).

The Obstacle Course is usually run in the early morning (to avoid the extreme afternoon heat) and obstacles are carefully monitored by staff.

== International Bases ==
Teen Missions operates 32 bases on 4 continents with nearly 300 fulltime staff worldwide. Each base is unique and ministry approaches are contextualized based on local needs and culture. The primary ministry efforts are as follows:

- Boot Camps — This program provides training for national youth through short-term work and evangelism projects
- Bible Schools — Bible Missionary & Work Training Centers (BMW) provide discipleship and missionary Training using a three-year program (two years academic plus one-year internship)
- Circuit Rider Sunday Schools — Circuit Riders share the gospel with children and adults through weekly lessons in addition to teaching English using phonics exercises, games and other projects.
- Rescue Units — Mercy ministry to underprivileged children, many of whom have lost one or both parents to AIDS. Children receive assistance to get into school and learn basic agriculture using community gardening. Basic medical care is often provided as needed. Children also learn of God's love for them through Bible stories and Sunday School lessons.
- Matron Units — At-risk young girls are given a safe place to attend high school when the school is located too far for a daily commute from home. This prevents the abuse and exploitation that often occurs in some rural areas without this help.

== Media ==
Teen Missions was featured in a "48 Hours" episode of CBS on April 12, 2008. The organization also received attention for assistance to orphans in Africa.

An article was written on Teen Missions in a Feb 15, 2008 issue of Christianity Today.

Florida Today reporter John A Torres travelled to Zambia with Teen Missions in 2006 resulting in a feature called Orphans & Angels

== Citations ==
- Anderson, Ken (1990). No Elephants Under Our Big Top. Merritt Island: Teen Missions International.
