= Kids on Fire School of Ministry =

Pentecostal summer camp at Devils Lake, North Dakota, US

Coordinates: 48°4′13.8″N 98°55′46.3″W

Kids on Fire School of Ministry was a Pentecostal summer camp at Devils Lake, North Dakota, United States. It is the setting of the Academy Award-nominated documentary Jesus Camp. The camp was run by the Reverend Becky Fischer.

== Closing ==
Becky Fischer announced that Kids on Fire would be closed indefinitely due to telephone calls, letters, and other negative reactions after the release of Jesus Camp. Fischer had rented the campground from the Assemblies of God, but was asked not to return because of vandalism at the campground after the film's release. Kids on Fire was disbanded, but is now regrouped as Kids in Ministry International. Under the new organization, Fischer has organized conferences instead of camps, but has not changed her message or methods.
