= The Boys of Baraka =

- Directed by: Heidi Ewing; Rachel Grady
- Produced by: Heidi Ewing; Rachel Grady
- Starring: Devon Brown; Richard Keyser
- Cinematography: Marco Franzoni; Tony Hardmon
- Edited by: Enat Sidi
- Music by: J.J. McGeehan
- Production company: ITVS
- Distributed by: THINKFilm
- Release date: 30 November 2005
- Running time: 84 min.
- Language: English

The Boys of Baraka is a 2005 documentary film produced and directed by filmmakers Heidi Ewing and Rachel Grady. The documentary follows twenty boys from Baltimore, Maryland who spend their seventh and eighth-grade years at a rural boarding school in northern Kenya.

It premiered at the South by Southwest Film Festival in 2005, where it won the Special Jury Award for Documentary Feature. It was released theatrically in 2006 by ThinkFilm. The film also won a Gold Hugo at the 2005 Chicago Film Festival for Best Documentary and an NAACP Image Award for Outstanding Independent or Foreign Film. The film was shortlisted for the 2006 Academy Awards and nominated for an Emmy for Outstanding Informational Programming.

== Synopsis ==
The Boys of Baraka is a documentary film that sheds light on the harsh realities faced by African American boys in Baltimore. The film addresses African-American boys' alarmingly high rate of failure to graduate from high school in Baltimore, with many ending up in jail. These numbers reflect the challenges posed by drug dealers, addiction, and a public school system overwhelmed by chaos.

The documentary focuses on four young boys: Devon Brown, Montrey Moore, Richard Keyser Jr., and Richard's younger brother, Romesh Vance. These boys, aged 12 and 13, find themselves at a critical juncture in their lives. Living in the tough streets of Baltimore, they are confronted with choices that could determine their futures. Will they succumb to the allure of the drug trade, manage to continue their education against the odds, or become victims of violence?

== Background ==
Founded by the private Abell Foundation in 1996, the Baraka School – "baraka" means "blessing" in Kiswahili, the native spoken language of eastern Africa – was designed to give "at-risk" African American boys from Baltimore a chance to learn in an environment far removed from their troubled neighbourhoods.

The Boys of Baraka is a co-production of the Independent Television Service (ITVS), produced in association with American Documentary | POV. The film was released theatrically in 2006 by Think Film.

== Reception ==
On review aggregator website Rotten Tomatoes, the film holds an approval rating of 76% based on 46 reviews, with an average rating of 7.2/10.
