= Jesus Camp =

2006 documentary film by Rachel Grady and Heidi Ewing

- Promotional release poster
- Directed by: Heidi Ewing; Rachel Grady
- Produced by: Heidi Ewing; Rachel Grady
- Starring: Becky Fischer; Mike Papantonio
- Cinematography: Mira Chang; Jenna Rosher
- Edited by: Enat Sidi
- Music by: Force Theory
- Distributed by: Magnolia Pictures; A&E Indie Films
- Release date: September 15, 2006
- Running time: 85 minutes
- Country: United States
- Language: English
- Box office: $1 million

Jesus Camp is a 2006 American documentary film directed by Rachel Grady and Heidi Ewing about a charismatic Christian summer camp, where children spend their summers being taught that they have "prophetic gifts" and can "take back America for Christ". According to the distributor, it "doesn't come with any prepackaged point of view" and attempts to be "an honest and impartial depiction of one faction of the evangelical Christian community".

Jesus Camp premiered at the 2006 Tribeca Film Festival, and was sold by A&E Indie Films to Magnolia Pictures. It was nominated for Best Documentary Feature at the 79th Academy Awards. The negative reaction the camp received due to the film led to its eventual closure.

== Overview ==
Jesus Camp follows the Kids on Fire School of Ministry, a charismatic Christian summer camp located just outside Devils Lake, North Dakota and run by Becky Fischer and her ministry, Kids in Ministry International. While Fischer's summer camp is sometimes identified as Pentecostal, Fischer is most closely associated with the neo-charismatic movement known as the New Apostolic Reformation (NAR). The film focuses on three of the children who attended the camp in the summer of 2005—Levi, Rachael, and Tory (Victoria). The film cuts between footage of the camp and a children's prayer conference held just before the camp at Christ Triumphant Church, a large charismatic church in Lee's Summit, Missouri, a suburb of Kansas City.

All three children are already very devout Christians. Levi has preached several sermons at his father's church, Rock of Ages Church in St. Robert, Missouri. He is homeschooled, his mother explaining that God did not give her a child just so he could be raised by someone else eight hours a day. He learns science from books and videos that attempt to reconcile young-earth creationism with scientific principles. Levi preaches a sermon at the camp in which he declares that his generation is key to bringing Jesus back. Rachael, who also attends Levi's church (her father was assistant pastor at the time), is seen praying over a bowling ball during a game early in the film, and evangelizes to strangers, telling them that Jesus loves them. She does not think highly of non-charismatic churches (or "dead churches" as she calls them), feeling they are not "churches that God likes to go to." Tory is a member of the Children's Praise Dance Team at Christ Triumphant Church. She is observed dancing to Christian rock music, and says she has to check herself to make sure she is not "dancing for the flesh."

At the camp, Fischer stresses the need for children to purify themselves in order to be part of the "army of God." She strongly believes that children need to be in the forefront of turning America toward conservative Christian values. She also feels that Christians need to focus on training kids since "the enemy" (radical Islam) is focused on training theirs. She compares the preparation she is giving children with the training of terrorists in the Middle East. "I want to see young people who are as committed to the cause of Jesus Christ as the young people are to the cause of Islam," she tells the camera. "I want to see them radically laying down their lives for the gospel, as they are over in Pakistan and Israel and Palestine."

In one scene shot at Christ Triumphant Church, a woman brings a life-sized cutout of George W. Bush to the front of the church and has the children stretch their hands toward him in prayer for him. In another scene, Fischer rails against Harry Potter, and says that it is a gateway to joining the occult, in an attempt to scare the children into avoiding it. She argues that if Harry Potter were a real warlock, and lived during the Old Testament era, that the Jews would have stoned him to death. In another scene, Lou Engle preaches a message urging children to join the fight to end abortion in America. Children are shown a series of plastic models of developing fetuses, and have their mouths covered with red tape with "Life" written across it. Engle is a founder of the Justice House of Prayer and a leader of Harvest International Ministries, a network of charismatic-oriented ministries with which both the church and Fischer's ministry are affiliated. He prays for Bush to have the strength to appoint "righteous judges" who will overturn Roe v. Wade. By the end of the sermon, the children are chanting, "Righteous judges! Righteous judges!"

There is also a scene at New Life Church in Colorado Springs, Colorado where Ted Haggard preaches a sermon against homosexuality. Before the service, Levi mentioned how he admired Ted Haggard and was looking forward to meeting him. After the sermon, Levi informs Haggard that he has already preached sermons and wants to be a preacher when he grows up. Haggard advises him: "I say, use your cute kid thing until you're thirty, and by then you'll have good content." Afterward, Levi, Rachael, Tory, their families and several other children take part in a Justice House of Prayer rally held by Engle in front of the U.S. Supreme Court.

Throughout the movie, there are cut scenes to a debate between Fischer and Mike Papantonio, an attorney and a radio talk-show host for Air America Radio's Ring of Fire. Papantonio questions Fischer's motives for focusing her ministry efforts on children. Fischer explains that she does not believe that people are able to choose their belief system once they pass childhood, and that it is important that they be "indoctrinated" in evangelical Christian values from a young age. Fischer also explains that democracy is flawed and designed to destroy itself "because we have to give everyone equal freedom".

== Release ==
Jesus Camp premiered at the Tribeca Film Festival in 2006, where it won a Special Jury Prize, and was acquired by Magnolia Pictures for theatrical distribution. It was later screened at Michael Moore's Traverse City Film Festival against the wishes of the distribution company, Magnolia Pictures. Magnolia had pulled Jesus Camp from the festival earlier in the summer after it purchased rights to the film, in a decision apparently inspired by Moore's association with the film festival, with Magnolia president Eamonn Bowles saying "I don't want the perception out in the public that this is an agenda-laden film".

=== Home media ===
The DVD, released in January 2007, includes 15 deleted scenes. In one of them, Levi's father and mother suggest that a future president may well have been at Kids on Fire. In another, a woman takes several of the kids on a "prayer walk" through Lee's Summit, and later takes them to a crisis pregnancy center. A Planned Parenthood clinic is located next door, and the woman has the kids pray over it. In an interview, the anti-abortion clinic's director says that she was very pleased to see children so passionate about ending abortion.

The DVD also includes commentary by Grady and Ewing. They reveal that when they arrived in Kansas City, there was a great deal of excitement over the nomination of Samuel Alito to the Supreme Court. However, according to Grady and Ewing, Fischer and the others did not see their activism for socially conservative causes as political, but as a matter of faith. They also reveal that Fischer and the others did not understand why some of the scenes of them speaking in tongues and praying over objects were included in the film, since such occurrences were second nature to them. Furthermore, on the DVD commentary, Heidi and Grady refer to the central character, Becky Fischer, as "a great documentary subject" because of her charisma.

== Reception ==
In November 2006, Fischer announced that she would be shutting down the camp due to negative reaction towards her in the film. According to Fischer's website, the owners of the property used for the camp shown in the film were concerned about vandalism to the premises following the film's release and thus will not allow it to be used for any future camps. Fischer has said that the camp will be indefinitely postponed until other suitable premises can be found, but that it will be back.

=== Critical reception ===
Jesus Camp received an 87% rating on Rotten Tomatoes, based on 105 reviews, with an average rating of 7.26/10. The website's consensus states, "Evangelical indoctrination is given an unflinching, even-handed look in this utterly worthwhile documentary." The documentary has a 62/100 score on Metacritic based on 28 mainstream critics.

Michael Smith of the Tulsa World gave the film three out of four, describing it as "impressive in its even-handed presentation", "straightforward" and "a revealing, unabashed look at the formation of tomorrow's army of God".

The Chicago Tribune reviewer Jessica Reaves also gave the film three out of four and wrote that Jesus Camp is "an enlightening and frank look at what the force known as Evangelical America believes, preaches and teaches their children" and concludes that what the filmmakers "have accomplished here is remarkable—capturing the visceral humanity, desire and unflagging political will of a religious movement".

David Edelstein of CBS Sunday Morning, New York, and NPR finds Jesus Camp "a frightening, infuriating, yet profoundly compassionate documentary about the indoctrination of children by the Evangelical right".

Some reviewers responded negatively: Rob Nelson of the Village Voice called the movie "[an] absurdly hypocritical critique of the far right's role in the escalating culture war", and J. R. Jones of the Chicago Reader criticized the film for "failing to distinguish the more fundamentalist Pentecostals" and for inserting "unnecessary editorializing" by using clips from Mike Papantonio's radio show.

The character Levi was manga artist Hajime Isayama's inspiration for naming the character Levi Ackerman in his manga series Attack on Titan.

=== Award nominations ===
Jesus Camp was nominated for Best Documentary Feature at the 79th Academy Awards; it lost to Davis Guggenheim and Al Gore's An Inconvenient Truth.

== See also ==
- Marjoe
- Religulous
- The God Who Wasn't There
- Friends of God: A Road Trip with Alexandra Pelosi
- One of Us
