= Steven Levitt =

American economist (born 1967)

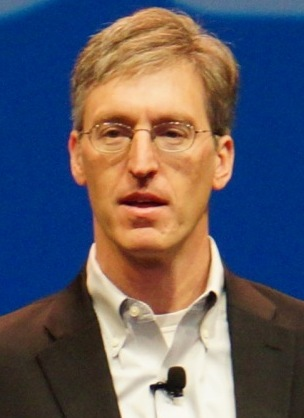
- Levitt in 2012
- Born: Steven David Levitt; May 29, 1967 (age 59); Boston, Massachusetts, U.S.
- Children: 7

Academic background
- Education: Harvard University (BA); Massachusetts Institute of Technology (PhD)
- Doctoral advisor: James M. Poterba
- Influences: Gary Becker; Kevin Murphy; Josh Angrist

Academic work
- Discipline: Social economics Applied Microeconomics
- School or tradition: Chicago School of Economics
- Institutions: University of Chicago
- Doctoral students: Brian Jacob
- Notable ideas: Freakonomics, SuperFreakonomics
- Awards: John Bates Clark Medal (2003)
- Website: Information at IDEAS / RePEc

Steven David Levitt (born May 29, 1967) is an American economist and co-author of the best-selling book Freakonomics and its sequels (along with Stephen J. Dubner). Levitt is a professor emeritus at the University of Chicago. Levitt was the winner of the 2003 John Bates Clark Medal for his work in the field of crime. He was co-editor of the Journal of Political Economy published by the University of Chicago Press until December 2007. In 2009, Levitt co-founded TGG Group, a business and philanthropy consulting company. He was chosen as one of Time magazine's "100 People Who Shape Our World" in 2006. A 2011 survey of economics professors named Levitt their fourth favorite living economist under the age of 60, after Paul Krugman, Greg Mankiw and Daron Acemoglu.

== Career ==
Levitt attended St. Paul Academy and Summit School in St. Paul, Minnesota. He graduated from Harvard University in 1989 with his BA in economics summa cum laude, writing his senior thesis on rational bubbles in horse breeding, and then worked as a consultant at Corporate Decisions, Inc. (CDI) in Boston advising Fortune 500 companies. He received his PhD in economics from MIT in 1994. He is currently the William B. Ogden Distinguished Service Professor and the director of Gary Becker Milton Friedman Institute for Research in Economics at the University of Chicago. In 2003 he won the John Bates Clark Medal, awarded every two years by the American Economic Association to the most promising U.S. economist under the age of 40. In April 2005 Levitt published his first book, Freakonomics (coauthored with Stephen J. Dubner), which became a New York Times bestseller. Levitt and Dubner also started a blog devoted to Freakonomics. From 2020 to 2025, Levitt hosted the podcast People I (Mostly) Admire.

He received the Quantrell Award in 1998.

== Work ==
Levitt has published over 60 academic publications, studying topics including crime, politics and sports, through the framework of economics. For example, his An Economic Analysis of a Drug-Selling Gang's Finances (2000) analyzes a hand-written "accounting" of a criminal gang, and draws conclusions about the income distribution among gang members. His most well-known and controversial paper (The Impact of Legalized Abortion on Crime (2001), co-authored with John Donohue) posits that the legalization of abortion in the US in 1973 was a major causal factor in the considerable reduction in crime that followed approximately eighteen years later.

=== The impact of legalized abortion on crime ===
Revisiting a question first studied empirically in the 1960s, Donohue and Levitt argued that the legalization of abortion could account for almost half of the reduction in crime witnessed in the 1990s. Their 2001 paper sparked much controversy, to which Levitt has said

". . . John Donohue and I estimate maybe that there are 5,000 or 10,000 fewer homicides because of it. But if you think that a fetus is like a person, then that's a horrible tradeoff. So ultimately I think our study is interesting because it helps us understand why crime has gone down. But in terms of policy towards abortion, you're really misguided if you use our study to base your opinion about what the right policy is towards abortion"

In 2003, Theodore Joyce argued that legalized abortion had little impact on crime, contradicting Donohue and Levitt's results. In 2004, the authors published a response, in which they claimed Joyce's argument was flawed due to omitted-variable bias.

In November 2005, Federal Reserve Bank of Boston economist Christopher Foote and his research assistant Christopher Goetz, published a paper, in which they argued that the results in Donohue and Levitt's paper were due to statistical errors made by the authors. When the corrections were made, Foote and Goetz argued that abortion actually increased violent crime instead of decreasing it.

In January 2006, Donohue and Levitt published a response, in which they admitted the errors in their original paper, but also pointed out that Foote and Goetz's correction was flawed due to heavy attenuation bias. The authors argued that, after making necessary changes to fix the original errors, the corrected link between abortion and crime was now weaker but still statistically significant.

In 2019, Levitt and Donohue published a new paper to review the predictions of the original 2001 paper. The authors concluded that the original predictions held up with strong effects. "We estimate that crime fell roughly 20% between 1997 and 2014 due to legalized abortion. The cumulative impact of legalized abortion on crime is roughly 45%, accounting for a very substantial portion of the roughly 50-55% overall decline from the peak of crime in the early 1990s."

== Views ==
When asked "If you could change one thing about the United States financial policies what would it be and why?", he replied "I hate "too big to fail".

He is an advocate of a carbon tax. On the Freakonomics podcast, Levitt laments: "literally every economist I've ever known would tell you, 'Of course we should have a tax on carbon. This could not be more obvious.'"

== Selected bibliography ==
=== Academic publications (in chronological order) ===
- "Four essays in positive political economy" PhD Thesis, DSpace@MIT. Massachusetts Institute of Technology, Dept. of Economics, 1994.
- "Using Repeat Challengers to Estimate the Effect of Campaign Spending on Election Outcomes in the U.S. House." Journal of Political Economy, 1994, 102(4), pp. 777–98.
- "How Do Senators Vote? Disentangling the Role of Voter Preferences, Party Affiliation, and Senator Ideology." American Economic Review, 1996, 86(3), pp. 425–41.
- "The Effect of Prison Population Size on Crime Rates: Evidence from Prison Overcrowding Litigation." Quarterly Journal of Economics, 1996, 111(2), pp. 319–51.
- "The Impact of Federal Spending on House Election Outcomes." Journal of Political Economy, 1997, 105(1), pp. 30–53. (with Snyder, James M. Jr.).
- "Using Electoral Cycles in Police Hiring to Estimate the Effect of Police on Crime." American Economic Review, 1997, 87(3), pp. 270–90.
- "Measuring Positive Externalities from Unobservable Victim Precaution: An Empirical Analysis of Lojack." Quarterly Journal of Economics, 1998, 113(1), pp. 43–77 (with Ayres, Ian).
- Levitt, Steven D. (1998). "Juvenile Crime and Punishment". Journal of Political Economy. 106 (6): 1156–85. doi:10.1086/250043. S2CID 158207361.
- "An Economic Analysis of a Drug-Selling Gang's Finances." Quarterly Journal of Economics, 2000, 115(3), pp. 755–89. (with Venkatesh, Sudhir A.).
- "The Impact of Legalized Abortion on Crime." Quarterly Journal of Economics, 2001, 116(2), pp. 379–420. (with Donohue, John J., III).
- "How Dangerous Are Drinking Drivers?" Journal of Political Economy, 2001, 109(6), pp. 1198–237. (with Porter, Jack) .
- "Testing Mixed-Strategy Equilibria When Players Are Heterogeneous: The Case of Penalty Kicks in Soccer." American Economic Review, 2002, 92, pp. 1138–51 (With Chiappori, Pierre-Andre and Groseclose, Timothy).
- "Winning Isn't Everything: Corruption in Sumo Wrestling." American Economic Review, 2002, 92(5), pp. 1594–605. (with Duggan, Mark).
- "Using Electoral Cycles in Police Hiring to Estimate the Effects of Police on Crime: Reply." American Economic Review, 2002, 92(4), pp. 1244–50.
- "Rotten Apples: An Investigation of the Prevalence and Predictors of Teacher Cheating" Quarterly Journal of Economics, 2003, 118(3), pp. 843–77. (with Jacob, Brian A.).
- "The Causes and Consequences of Distinctively Black Names." Quarterly Journal of Economics, 2004, 119(3), pp. 767–805. (with Fryer, Roland G. Jr.)
- Levitt, Steven D. (2004). "Testing Theories Of Discrimination: Evidence From Weakest Link" (PDF). Journal of Law and Economics. 47 (2): 431–53. doi:10.1086/425591.
- Levitt, Steven D. (Winter 2004). "Understanding Why Crime Fell in the 1990s: Four Factors that Explain the Decline and Six that Do Not" (PDF). Journal of Economic Perspectives. 18: 163–90. doi:10.1257/089533004773563485.
- Levitt, Steven D. (2004). "How Do Markets Function? An Empirical Analysis of Gambling on the National Football League". Economic Journal.
- Levitt, Steven D. (2004). "The Impact of School Choice on Student Outcomes: An Analysis of the Chicago Public Schools". Journal of Public Economics.
- Levitt, Steven D.(with Roland G. Fryer) (2005). "The Black-White Test Score Gap Through Third Grade". American Law and Economics Review.
- Levitt, Steven D. (with Rubio, Mauricio) (2005). "Understanding Crime in Columbia and What Can Be Done About it". Institutional Reforms: The Case of Columbia.
- Levitt, Steven D. (2006). "The Case of the Critics Who Missed the Point: A Reply to Webster et al". Criminology and Public Policy. 5 (3): 449–460. doi:10.1111/j.1745-9133.2006.00400.x.
- Levitt, Steven D. (with Cullen, JB, Jacob, BA) (2006). "The Effect of School Choice on Participants: Evidence from Randomized Lotteries". Econometrica.
- Levitt, Steven D. (2006). "White-Collar Crime Writ Small: A Case Study of Bagels, Donuts, and the Honor System". American Economic Review. 96 (2): 290–294. doi:10.1257/000282806777212161.
- Levitt, Steven D. (with Gil, R) (2007). "Testing the Efficiency of Markets in the 2002 World Cup". Journal of Prediction Markets.
- Levitt, Steven D. (with John List) (2007). "Viewpoint: On the Generalizability of Lab Behavior in the Field". Canadian Journal of Economics. 40 (2): 347–370. doi:10.1111/j.1365-2966.2007.00412.x.
- Levitt, Steven D. (with John List) (2007). "What Do Laboratory Experiments Measuring Social Preferences Reveal about the Real World?" (PDF). Journal of Economic Perspectives. 21 (2): 153–174. doi:10.1257/jep.21.2.153.
- Levitt, Steven D. (with Susan Athey, Lawrence F. Katz, Alan B. Krueger, James Poterba) (2007). "What Does Performance in Graduate School Predict? Graduate Economics Education and Student Outcomes". American Economic Review.
- Levitt, Steven D. (with Syverson, Chad) (2008). "Antitrust Implications of Home Seller Outcomes when using Flat-Fee Real Estate Agents". Brookings-Wharton Papers on Urban Affairs. doi:10.1353/urb.2008.a249797.
- Levitt, Steven D. (with John List) (2008). "Economics: Homo Economicus Evolves". Science. 319 (5865): 909–910. doi:10.1126/science.1153640. PMID 18276876.
- Levitt, Steven D. (2008). "Evidence that Seat Belts Are as Effective as Child Safety Seats in Preventing Death for Children" (PDF). The Review of Economics and Statistics. doi:10.1162/rest.90.1.158.
- Levitt, Steven D. (with Fryer, Roland, John List) (2008). "Exploring the Impact of Financial Incentives on Stereotype Threat: Evidence from a Pilot Study". AEA Papers and Proceedings.
- Levitt, Steven D. (with Syverson, Chad) (2008). "Market Distortions when Agents are Better Informed: The Value of Information in RealEstate Transactions" (PDF). Review of Economics and Statistics. 90 (4): 599–611. doi:10.1162/rest.90.4.599.
- Levitt, Steven D. (with Donohue, John) (2008). "Measurement Error, Legalized Abortion, and the Decline in Crime: A Response to Foote and Goetz". Quarterly Journal of Economics.
- Levitt, Steven D. (with David Herberich, John List) (2009). "Can Field Experiments Return Agricultural Economics to the Glory Days?". American Journal of Agricultural Economics.
- Levitt, Steven D. (with John List) (2009). "Field Experiments in Economics: The Past, the Present, and the Future" (PDF). European Economic Review. 53: 1–18. doi:10.1016/j.euroecorev.2008.12.001.
- Levitt, Steven D. (with Donohue, John J., Jeff Grogger) (2009). "The impact of legalized abortion on teen childbearing". American Law and Economics Review.
- Levitt, Steven D. (with Roland Fryer) (2010). "An Empirical Analysis of the Gender Gap in Mathematics". American Economic Journal: Applied Economics.
- Levitt, Steven D. (with Joseph Doyle) (2010). "Evaluating the Effectiveness of Child Safety Seats and Seat Belts in Protecting Children from Injury". Economic Inquiry.
- Levitt, Steven D. (with John List, David Reilly) (2010). "What Happens in the Field Stays in the Field: Exploring Whether Professionals Play Minimax in Laboratory Experiments". Econometrica.
- Levitt, Steven D. (with John List, Sally Sadoff) (2011). "Checkmate: Exploring Backward Induction among Chess Players" (PDF). American Economic Review. 101 (2): 975–990. doi:10.1257/aer.101.2.975.
- Levitt, Steven D. (with Dana Chandler, John A. List) (2011). "Predicting and Preventing Shootings Among At-Risk Youth". American Economic Association Papers and Proceedings.
- Levitt, Steven D. (with John List) (2011). "Was there really a Hawthorne Effect at the Hawthorne Plant? An Analysis of the Original Illumination Experiments". American Economic Journal: Applied Economics. 3: 224–238. doi:10.1257/app.3.1.224.
- Levitt, Steven D. (with Roland Fryer) (2012). "Hatred and Profits: Under the Hood of the Ku Klux Klan". The Quarterly Journal of Economics.
- Levitt, Steven D. (2012). "Identifying Terrorists using Banking Data". The B.E. Journal of Economics Analysis and Policy. 13 (3). doi:10.1515/1935-1682.3282.
- Levitt, Steven D. (with Thomas J. Miles, Andrew M. Rosenfield) (2012). "Is Texas Hold 'Em a Game of Chance? A Legal and Economic Analysis". The Georgetown Law Journal.
- Levitt, Steven D. (with Roland Fryer, Lisa Kahn, Jorg Spenkuch) (2012). "The Plight of Mixed-Race Adolescents". Review of Economics and Statistics.
- Levitt, Steven D. (with Thomas J. Miles) (2012). "The Role of Skill Versus Luck in Poker Evidence from the World Series of Poker". Journal of Sports Economics.
- Levitt, Steven D. (with Roland G. Fryer, Paul S. Heaton, Kevin M. Murphy) (2013). "Measuring the Impact of Crack Cocaine". Economic Inquiry.

=== Other publications (in chronological order) ===
- Freakonomics: A Rogue Economist Explores the Hidden Side of Everything, co-author with Stephen Dubner, (2005) (ISBN 0-061-23400-1)
- SuperFreakonomics: Global Cooling, Patriotic Prostitutes, and Why Suicide Bombers Should Buy Life Insurance, co-author with Stephen Dubner (2009) (ISBN 0-060-88957-8)
- Think Like a Freak: The Authors of Freakonomics Offer to Retrain Your Brain, co-author with Stephen Dubner (2014) (ISBN 0-062-21833-6)
- When to Rob a Bank: ...And 131 More Warped Suggestions and Well-Intended Rants, co-author with Stephen Dubner (2015) (ISBN 0-062-38532-1)
