= Self-defence law (Czech Republic) =

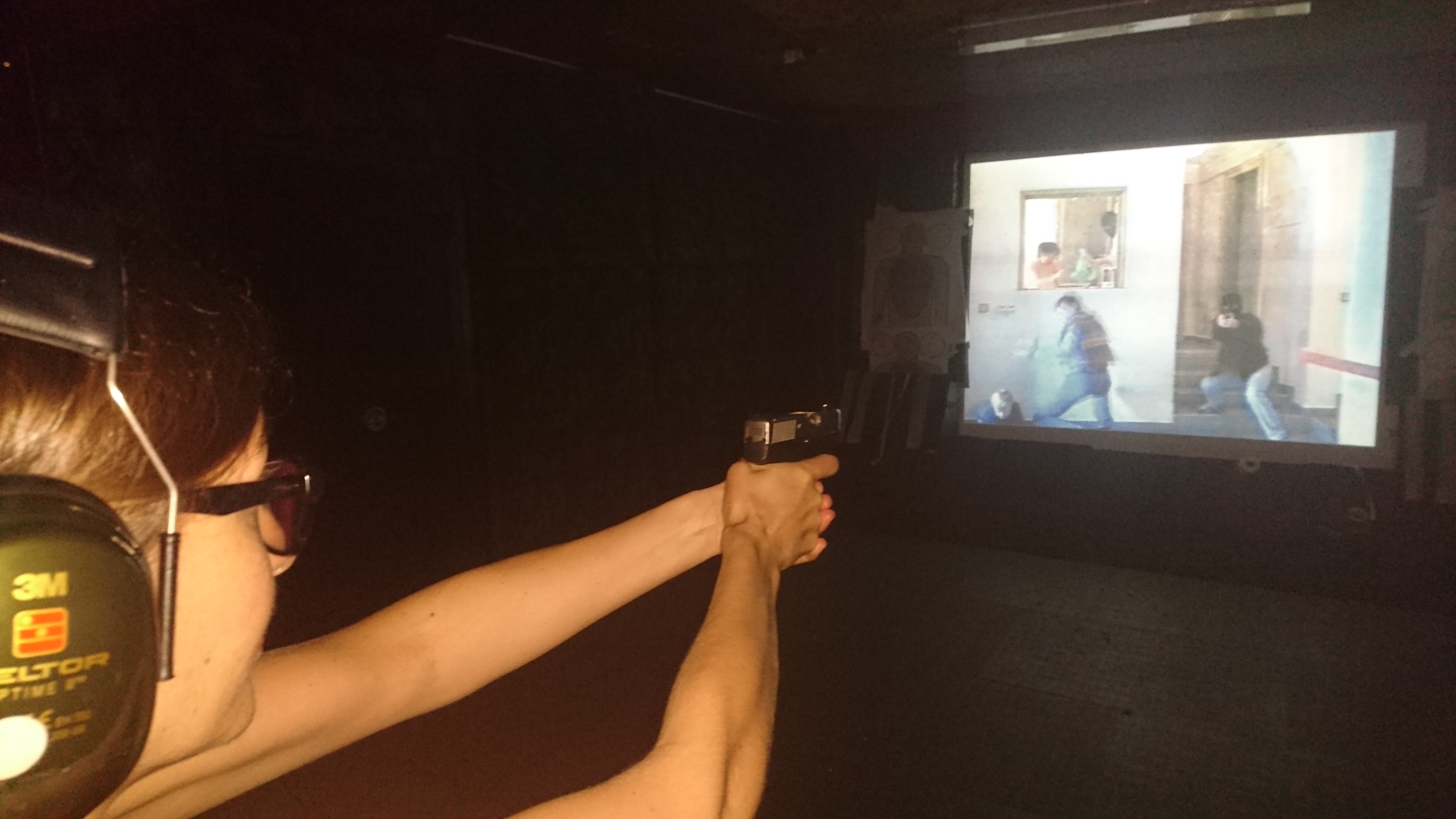
A woman trains real-life defensive gun use scenarios with live ammunition at a video shooting range in Prague, Czech Republic.

Czech criminal law defines self-defense (nutná obrana, lit. "necessary defense") as a person's action which averts an ongoing or imminent attack and which is not manifestly (lit: "obviously grossly") disproportionate to the manner of the attack. This definition stems from the Article 29 of the Act No. 40/2009 Coll., the Criminal Code.

In the Czech Republic, self-defense is considered to be an individual human right protected under Article 2(4) of the Constitution and Articles 2(3) and 6(4) of the Charter of Fundamental Rights and Freedoms.

Czech law does not include specific provisions regarding self-defense with use of a weapon. Same rules apply in case of unarmed defense or defense with any type of weapon. The Ministry of the Interior officially recommends carrying non-lethal weapons such as pepper sprays, paralyzers, or gas pistols as means of self-defense. Unlike in most other European countries, Czech citizens have the right to keep and bear firearms for personal protection, for which they must first obtain a shall-issue license.

== History of Czech law on self-defense ==
Historically, the self-defense related case law was primarily dealing with killing of an assailant that had attempted an attack against defender's life. This had progressively led to self-defense being understood in very broad terms as an action averting any kind of imminent attack. The first codification of the criminal law took place in 1803 when the Czech Crown Lands were part of the Habsburg monarchy and included an article on self-defense as an exculpatory provision to murder. In 1852, under Austrian Empire, a major recodification took place, which introduced a general article on self defense in Section 2 of the Criminal Code. This law remained in place for next nearly 100 years, including after the 1918 Czechoslovak declaration of independence. I.e. in period of 1803 - 1949, the Czech lands had same law on self defense as Austrian lands. The law protected self-defense against an attack targeting "life, liberty or property"; "life" was interpreted extensively, covering any attack against physical integrity. The main limit of self-defense was defined as "necessity".

Following the Communist Coup a new Criminal Act was enacted in 1950. The law, including the article on self defense, was inspired by Soviet Union's model. The law protected self-defense against an attack targeting "people's democratic republic, its socialist development, interests of the working people or individuals". The main limit of self-defense was defined as "adequacy".

A major recodification took place in 1961. Since this year, the law protects self-defense against an attack that targets "interests protected by the Criminal Act", meaning any interests that are focus of protection as listed in the particular crimes. The main limit of defense was defined as "clear disproportionality to the nature and dangerousness of the attack". After the Velvet Revolution, the limits of self-defense were expanded in 1994. The limit of self-defense was newly defined as "manifest disproportionality to the manner of attack". The Supreme Court of the Czech Republic interprets the limit being a defense which is "absolutely unequivocally, extremely grossly exaggerated", meaning that "the defender's act does not clearly, obviously and unquestionably correspond to all the relevant circumstances characterising the manner of the attack".

In 2021, the Parliament of the Czech Republic adopted a second amendment to the Charter of Fundamental Rights and Freedoms, adding a new guaranty, which states: "The right to defend own life or life of another person also with arms is guaranteed under conditions set out in the law." This is interpreted as guaranteeing legal accessibility of arms in a way that must ensure possibility of effective self-defense.

== Law on self-defense ==
(1) An act otherwise criminal, by which a person averts an imminent or ongoing attack to an interest protected by the Criminal Code, shall not be considered as a criminal offence.
(2) It is not a necessary defence, if the defence was obviously grossly disproportionate to the manner of the attack.

— Section 29 of the Criminal Code, "Necessary Defence"

=== General explanation ===
Necessary self-defense may be invoked to deflect imminent or ongoing attack against an interest protected by the Criminal Code (such as right to property or right to life) by performing an action which would otherwise be punishable (such as use of a firearm against the other person).

Unlike in case of utmost necessity, there is no requirement of subsidiarity, i.e. no duty to retreat. There is also no requirement for proportionality as the law stipulates that defense may not be manifestly disproportionate (a different translation: obviously grossly disproportionate) to the manner of the attack. The manner of attack includes everything from intensity of attack, attacker's personality, attributes and intent, possible previous actions by the attacker (threats, stalking, etc.), place and time of attack, numerical advantage and possibility of other persons joining the attacker, attacker's option to use a weapon, etc.

It is generally accepted by Czech jurisprudence and case law that in order for defense to be successful, defensive action must exceed the intensity of the attack.

It is completely legal for a person to prepare for eventual need to defend themselves, including with weapons. A person may also defend themselves against an attack that they provoked, as long as they did not start offensive action or did not engage in mutual fight. Defender may commence his action before attacker in case that an attack is imminent, however those cases are often difficult to prove.

In case that a defender has multiple defensive options available (e.g. pepper spray and a firearm), they are not bound to escalate from the least effective to the most effective and they do not need to explain the choice they made. The only limitation is that the final choice, i.e. action taken, shall not be manifestly disproportionate to the manner of attack.

The manner in which a weapon was used, not the use of a weapon alone is decisive as regards meeting of the limit of prohibition of manifestly disproportionate defense. I.e. a warning shot or shot intended towards non-critical part of attacker's body may be within the limits of necessary defense in cases where the manner of attack does not warrant a shot aimed into a critical part of body.

Defensive action may not continue after an attack has ended. In case that the defender is prosecuted, proving that defense continued beyond the end of the attack is upon the prosecution and shall be decided in line with in dubio pro reo principle.

=== Defensive gun use cases ===
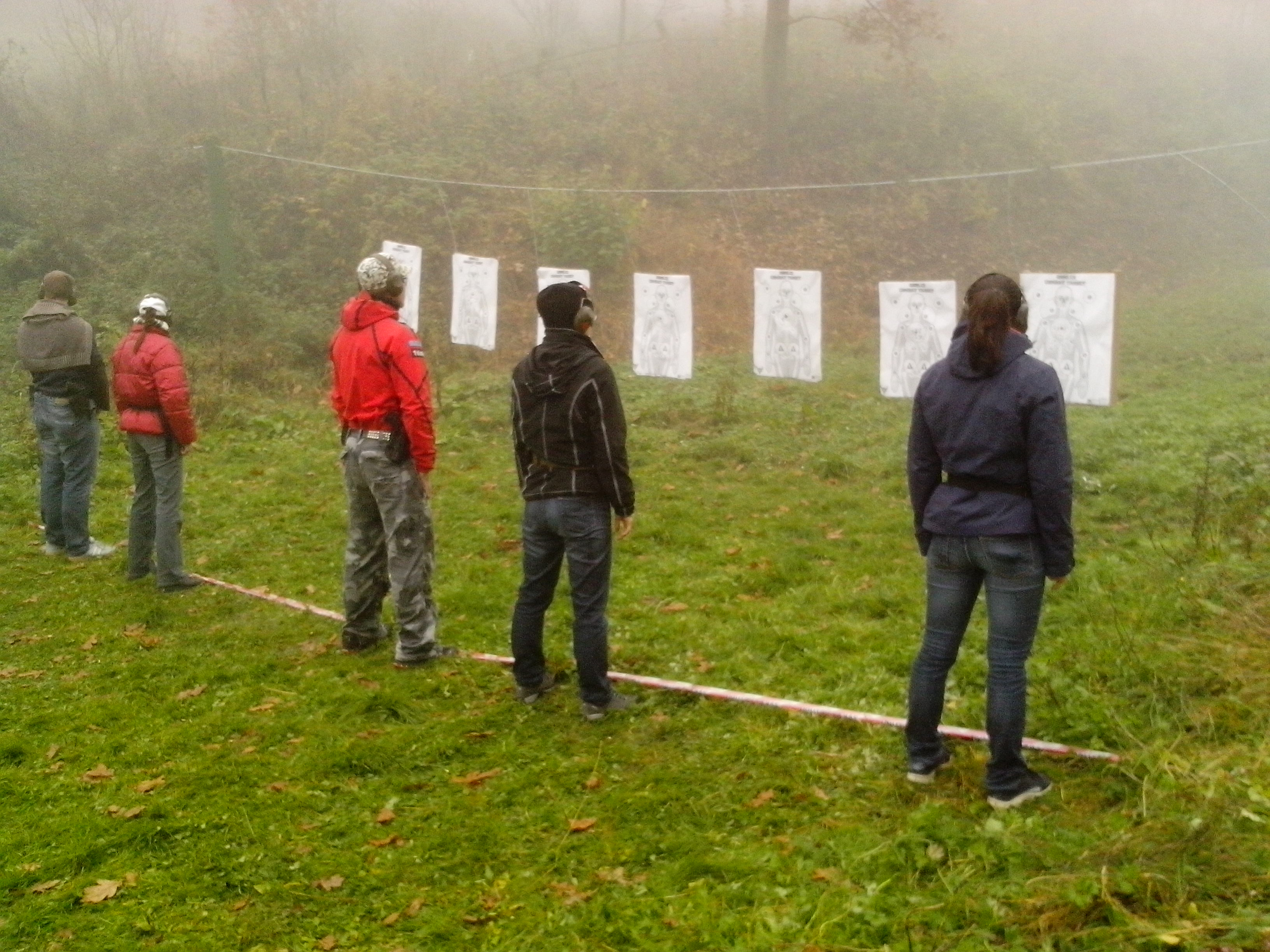
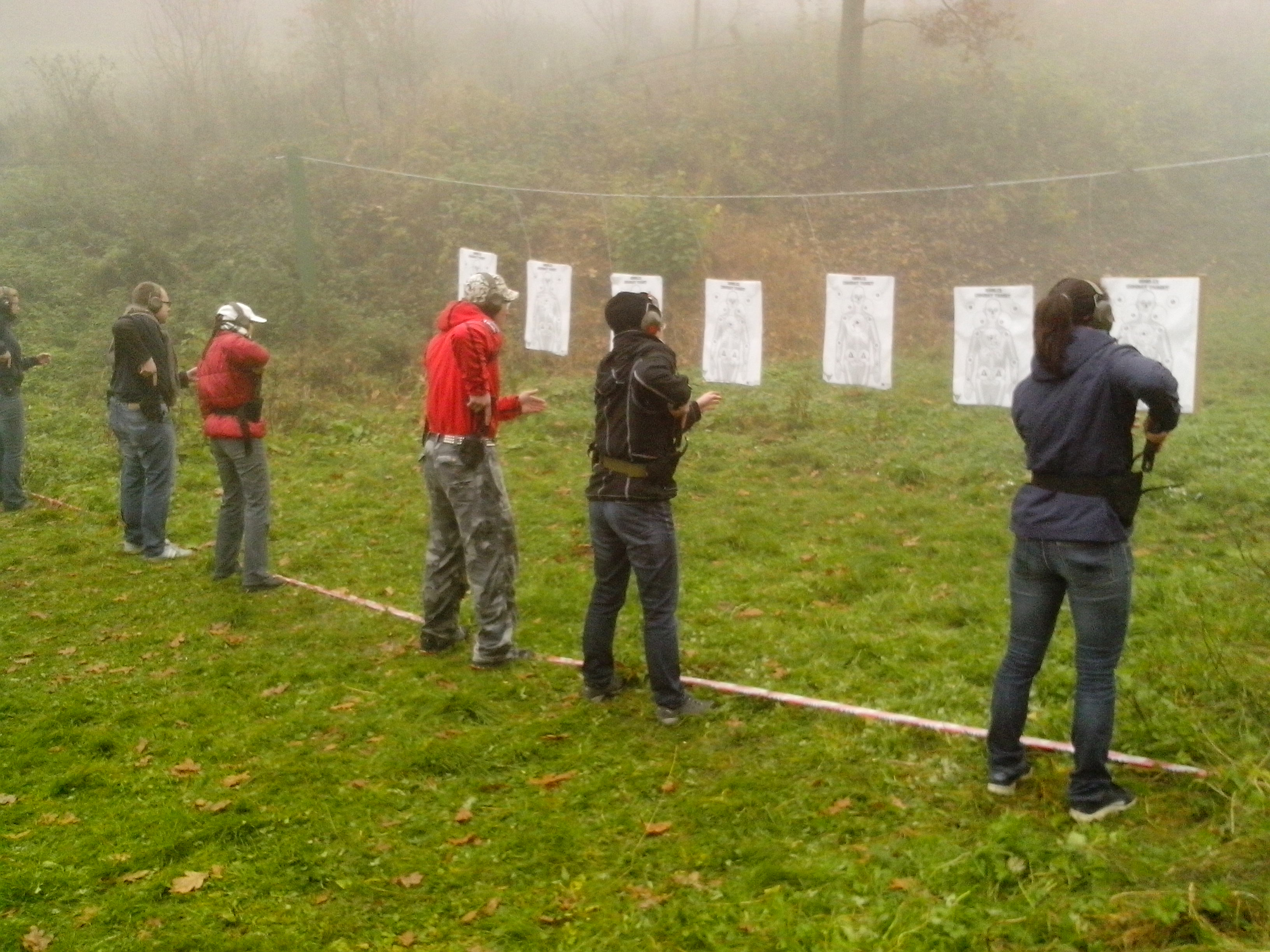
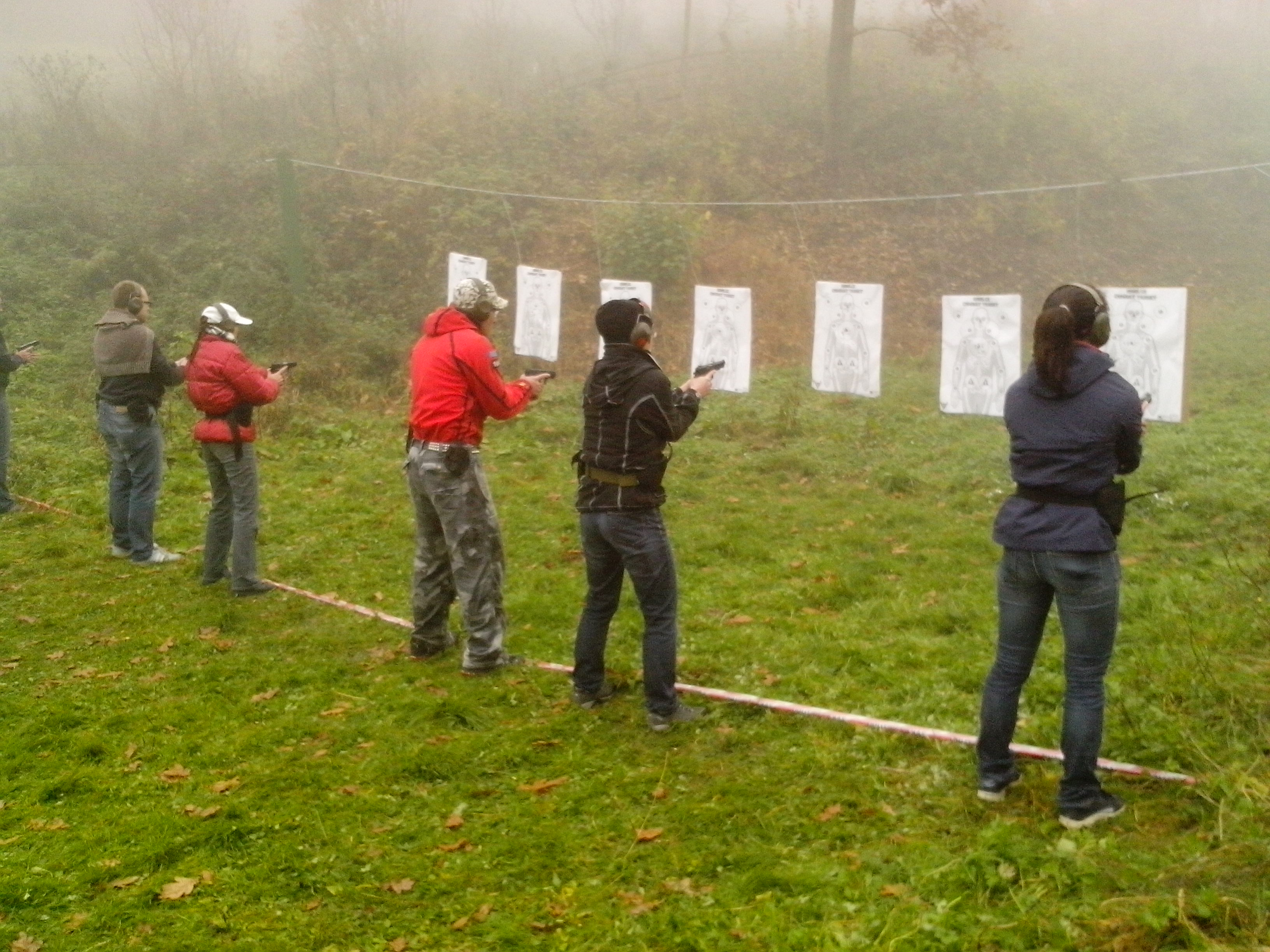
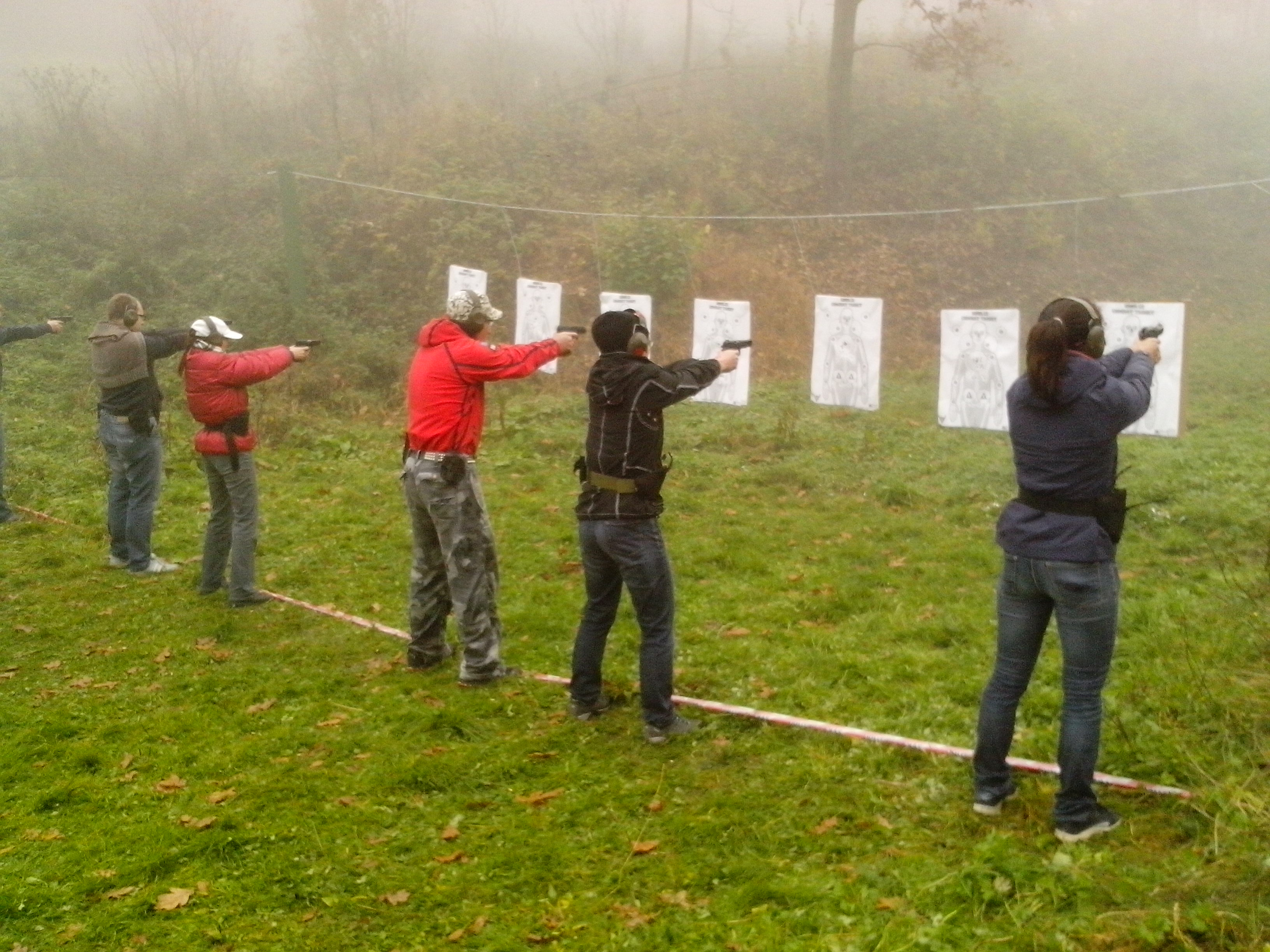
People training self-defense with firearm in the Czech Republic

Only slightly more than 3% of Czech adult population have concealed carry licenses. This together with a generally low rate of violent crime makes defensive gun uses relatively rare. More common are defensive knife uses, as there are no limitations on carrying of weapons other than firearms. Even more common are defensive uses of pepper sprays, the carrying of which is officially recommended by Ministry of Interior to women, elderly and other vulnerable groups.

It is acceptable to use a firearm during defense against a violent attack especially when a person is attacked with a knife or another weapon. Shooting of unarmed attackers also occurs and becomes sometimes a subject of controversy. In general, each case is investigated in great detail before being eventually dismissed as legitimate self-defense. The defense is judged according to the subjective and objective perception of the defender during the time of the imminent or ongoing attack, and not according to the view of persons who are judging it ex-post. As regards home defense, there is no Castle Doctrine in the Czech Republic. Multiple attempts at introducing it into Czech law failed. Defense at home is thus judged similarly as at any other place.

A number of successful defensive uses of firearms or other weapon is being cleared as legitimate self-defense by authorities every year without raising wider public concern, including for example a 2014 shooting of an attacker by a bartender in Hořovice, or a 2014 shooting of an aggressive burglar in a garage by homeowner in Čimice. However, some cases become rather notable, such as:

- In 1991, the defensive killing of a Nazi skinhead by a famous sculptor Pavel Opočenský, who attempted to help a couple that had been attacked on the street of Prague. Opočenský stabbed a 17-year-old metal-bar-wielding skinhead. The case included several reversals of Opočenský's conviction by higher court and significantly advanced case law on self defense. White power skinheads also conducted various protests throughout the many years of trials. A neo-nazi band Agrese 95 released a song titled "We shall go together and kill Opočenský."
- In 1993, a group of five men decided to visit a friend who had previously brokered a deal, under which the men loaned 3,3 million CZK (US$120.000) to a Slovak entrepreneur. Instead of making quick profit on the loan, the men lost almost all of the loaned money. The broker first let the men into his house, but as the conversation heated up, he ordered them to leave. Due to their reluctance the broker ordered them to leave again, this time at gunpoint. While three of the men ran away from the house, the remaining two attacked the broker and managed to disarm him, at which point one shot went out from the firearm, not hitting anyone. The attack against the broker continued and included fingers being pushed into his eyes, which left him unable to see. The broker however managed to get hold of another firearm during the brawl, a six-shot Arminius HW .38 revolver and fired off five shots. Three of them turned out to be perfect headshots, instantly killing the attackers. The broker was first charged with double murder. Due to unusual circumstances, the police investigation ran for two years without indictment as the police ordered the making of several written expert opinions. The case was closed in 1995 as legitimate self-defense with charges being dropped.
- In 2003, Slavoj Hašek was awoken by commotion from outside of his house. Hašek left his house with a shotgun and pursued a thief. After the thief got to his own car and drove it in Hašek's direction, he shot and killed him. Hašek was sentenced to five years imprisonment with the High Court in Olomouc arguing that the defense could not be legitimate, since the shot went through a side window rather than through the front windshield. Hašek was pardoned by President Václav Klaus shortly thereafter.
- In 2006, a private security guard with a pistol pursued on foot two men who he believed tried to steal scrap metal. The men climbed on a railway embankment and started throwing rocks down at the guard who thereafter shot ten rounds in their direction, mortally wounding one of them in the head. The guard was first convicted of murder by the Municipal Court in Prague and given a sentence of 7 years imprisonment. The decision was changed by the High Court in Prague to conviction of intentional infliction of bodily harm resulting in death (i.e. manslaughter) and a sentence of five years imprisonment. The guard was finally exonerated by the Supreme Court in Brno which considered his action legitimate self-defense, noting that defense must be clearly more intensive than attack in order to be successful, and that the stones and bricks being thrown presented grave danger to the man's life.
- In 2009, a security system at a scrap metal yard, which had been repeatedly burgled, went off. The yard's owner was at the time on a hunt close to the yard and drove directly to it. A group of burglars jumped into their car and attempted to drive away. The owner used his shotgun and attempted to shoot the car's tires, hitting and wounding two of its occupants. He was sentenced to 6 years imprisonment for intentional infliction of bodily harm, a sentence that was confirmed on appeal. The owner received full presidential pardon.
- In 2010, a student from Azerbaijan was verbally attacked by a group of other foreigners in a bar in Prague. The student left the bar and proceeded to his friend's car, being followed by the group who continued to verbally attack him and his family and stating that "the issue needs to be solved immediately". The student recovered a knife from the car and took a stand. Thereafter one of the foreigners started punching him. The student stabbed one of the four attackers and then engaged in a fight with another, whom he stabbed in the leg and who bled to death. The Municipal Court in Prague convicted the Azerbaijani student of intentional infliction of bodily harm with excusable motive and sentenced him to two years in prison. The decision was overturned by the High Court in Prague who considered the death an outcome of legitimate self-defense. The Supreme State Attorney mounted an extraordinary appeal to the Supreme Court, which however confirmed the acquittal, noting that the verbal abuse continued even after the victim got into the car and he could thus legitimately perceive it as an ongoing attack. The Supreme Court also refused the Municipal Court's previous line of argumentation that the victim could have easily left the place once in the car (as there is no duty to retreat under Czech law) as well as its reasoning that the threat did not reach such an intensity as to justify a lethal defense.
- In 2012, two brothers in their early 20s, one of them armed with a knife, attacked a 63-year-old man in a town in the Northern Bohemian borderland. He shot both attackers with his legally owned pistol, killing one of them. The police closed the case as legitimate self-defense six months later and brought charges against the surviving attacker.
- In the 2017 Chomutov incident, a 37-year-old man believed that a vehicular rampage is taking place in front of his home and in an effort to stop it, he shot the 34 year old driver dead. The ensuing court trial gained major public attention.
- In 2017, a man with criminal and drug abuse history attempted to rob a store in Prague, armed with a knife. He managed to stab the store clerk in the neck, but was then shot by store owner's wife and later died in hospital. Police ruled out the shooting as legitimate self-defense. She was later awarded for the deed by the Prague City Council.
- In 2018, a man riding a tram in Ostrava started attacking other commuters with a glass bottle and fist punches. When he started to stomp on a head of one of them, a woman with concealed carry license (E license) pulled out her handgun and ordered him to stop or be shot. He complied and stopped the attack. She later received a medal from the City of Ostrava for the deed.
- In 2018, a drunk man refused to pay in a pub and verbally attacked a female bartender, another guest tried to defend the bartender but was attacked instead. The defender reached for his revolver, while being strangled on the ground, and fired a shot into the attacker. The attacker died. At first, the prosecutor didn't push any charges. Later, this case has been brought to court and ruled legitimate self defense.

== Other relevant legal concepts ==
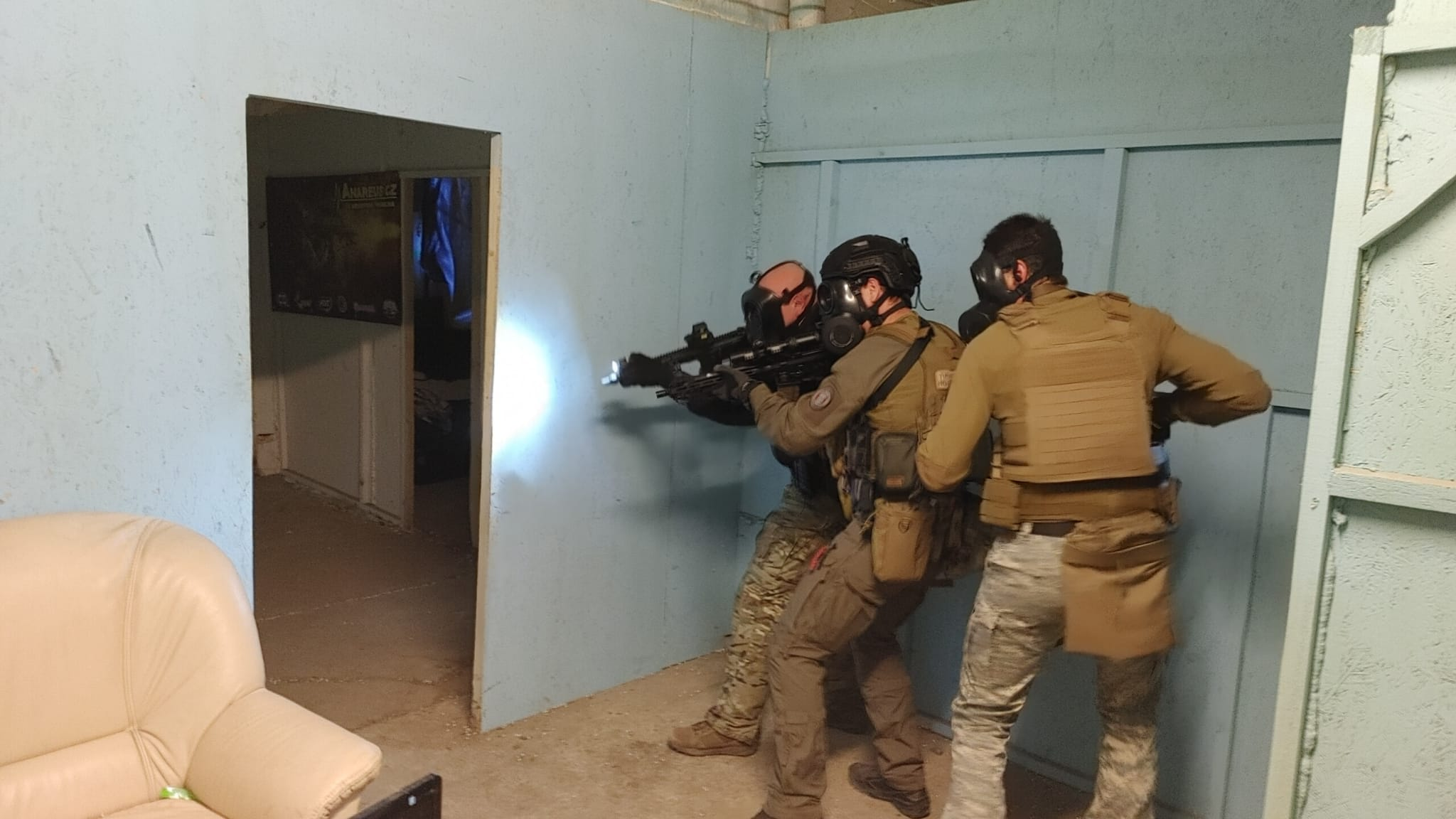
Designated Reserve members traininig self-defense against active attacker

Czech law includes other concepts that may be relevant in self-defense scenarios. Primarily it is "utmost necessity", which may be invoked in case of defense against types of danger other than a person's attack, e.g. defense against a raging dog. In law enforcement context, "eligible use of a weapon" may be also relevant.

=== Utmost necessity ===
Utmost necessity may be invoked when an ongoing danger other than an attack threatens an interest protected by the Criminal Code (such as right to property or right to life). Common examples include breaking through a car window in order to save a pet from heat or using neighbour's pool water in order to extinguish a fire.

An example of an attack by a raging dog is commonly used to explain the difference between utmost necessity and necessary self defence. Only a person can commit an attack in a legal sense. Hence defensive action against a raging dog falls within the limits of utmost necessity, while defensive action against a dog that was directly ordered to attack by owner falls within limits of necessary self defense. This distinction is important as limits of defensive action taken under each of these concepts differ greatly.

There are two main limitations to utmost necessity:

- The consequences of defensive action may not be equal or greater than that of endangerment (proportionality).
- There is no other way of deflecting the danger than by taking the given action (subsidiarity), i.e. a concept similar to common law duty to retreat.

=== Eligible use of a weapon ===
Eligible use of a weapon is addressed in special enactments dealing with police, secret security service, prison guards etc. Thus for example a policeman may, under specified conditions, shoot on an escaping suspect, a privilege which an armed civilian does not have.
