= Defensive gun use =

Use of a firearm to protect people or property

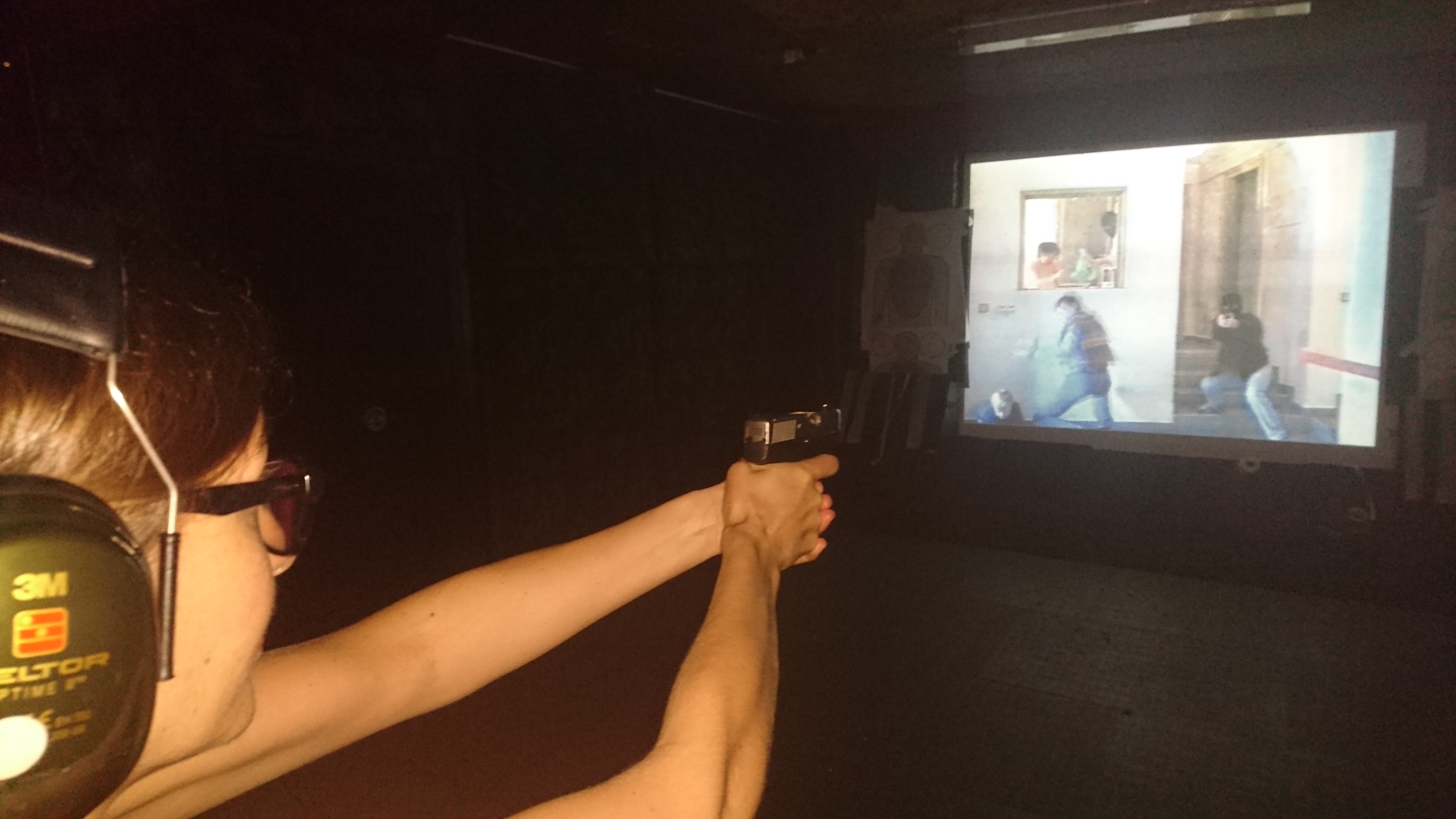
A woman trains real-life defensive gun use scenarios with live ammunition at a video shooting range in Prague, Czech Republic.

Defensive gun use (DGU) is the use or presentation of a firearm for self-defense, defense of others or, in some cases, protecting property. The frequency of incidents involving DGU and their effectiveness in providing safety and reducing crime are controversial issues in gun politics and criminology, chiefly in the United States. Different authors and studies employ different criteria for what constitutes a defensive gun use which leads to controversy in comparing statistical results. Perceptions of defensive gun use are recurring themes in discussions over gun rights, gun control, armed police, open and concealed carry of firearms.

== Estimates of frequency ==
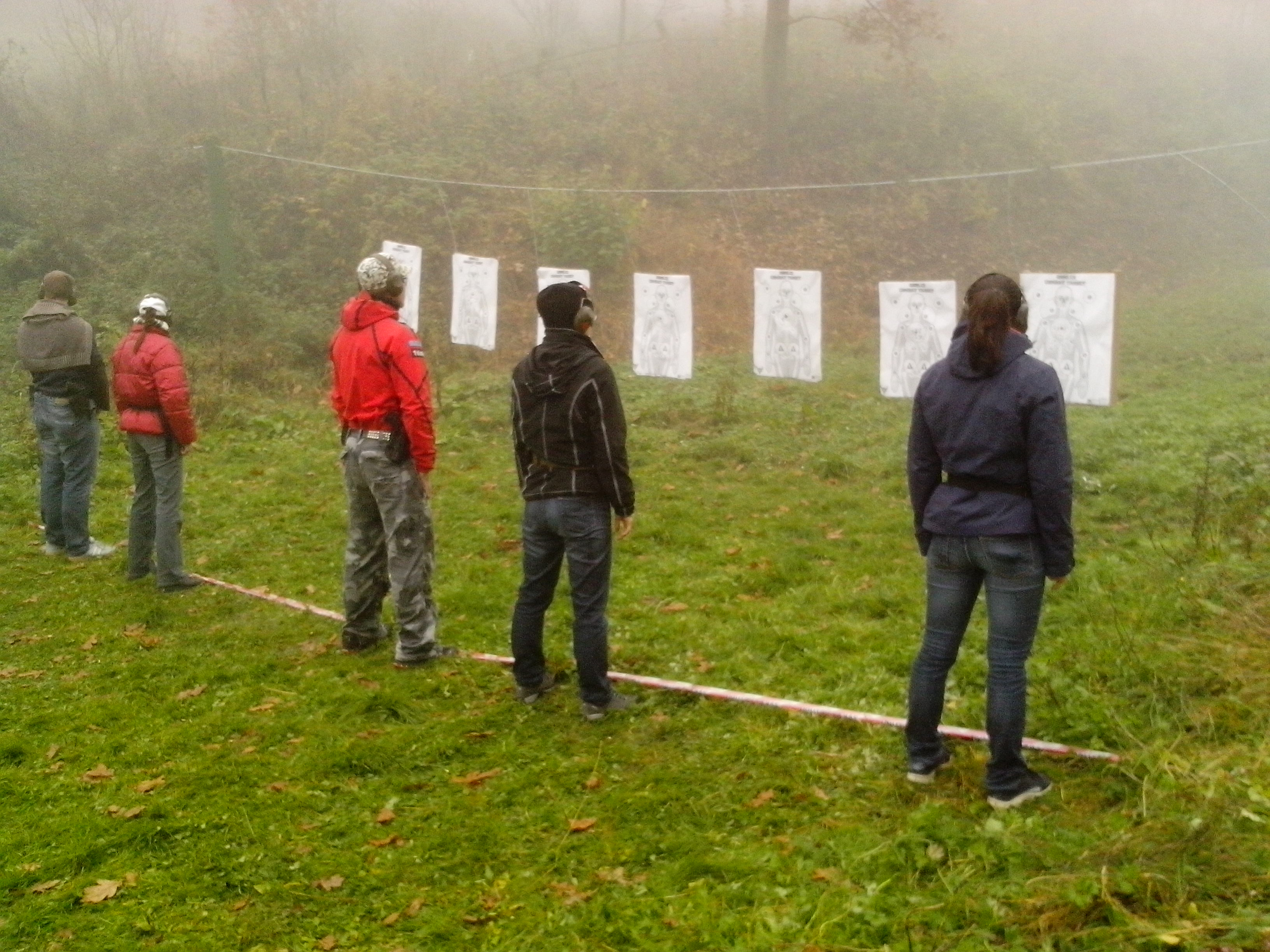
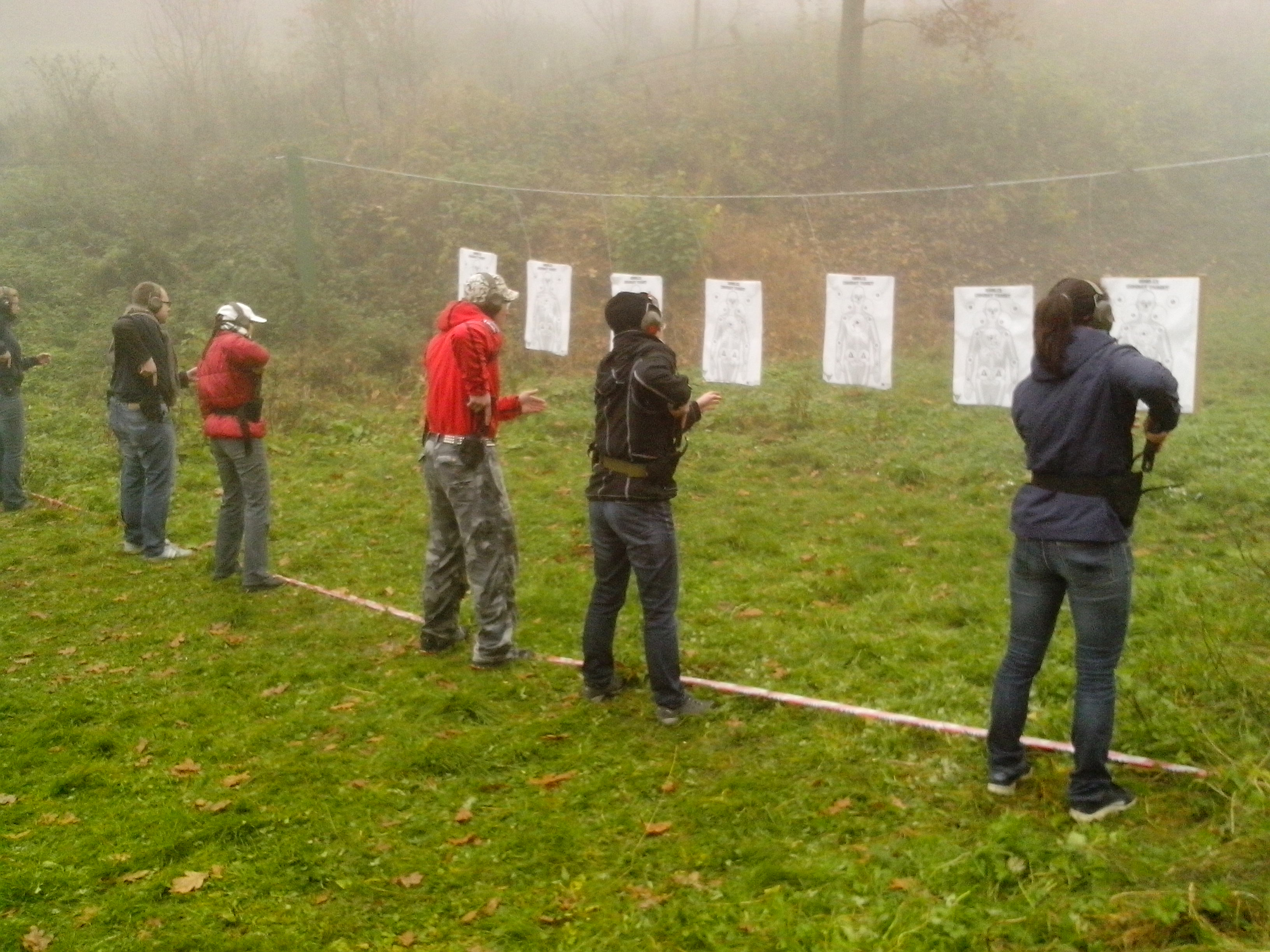
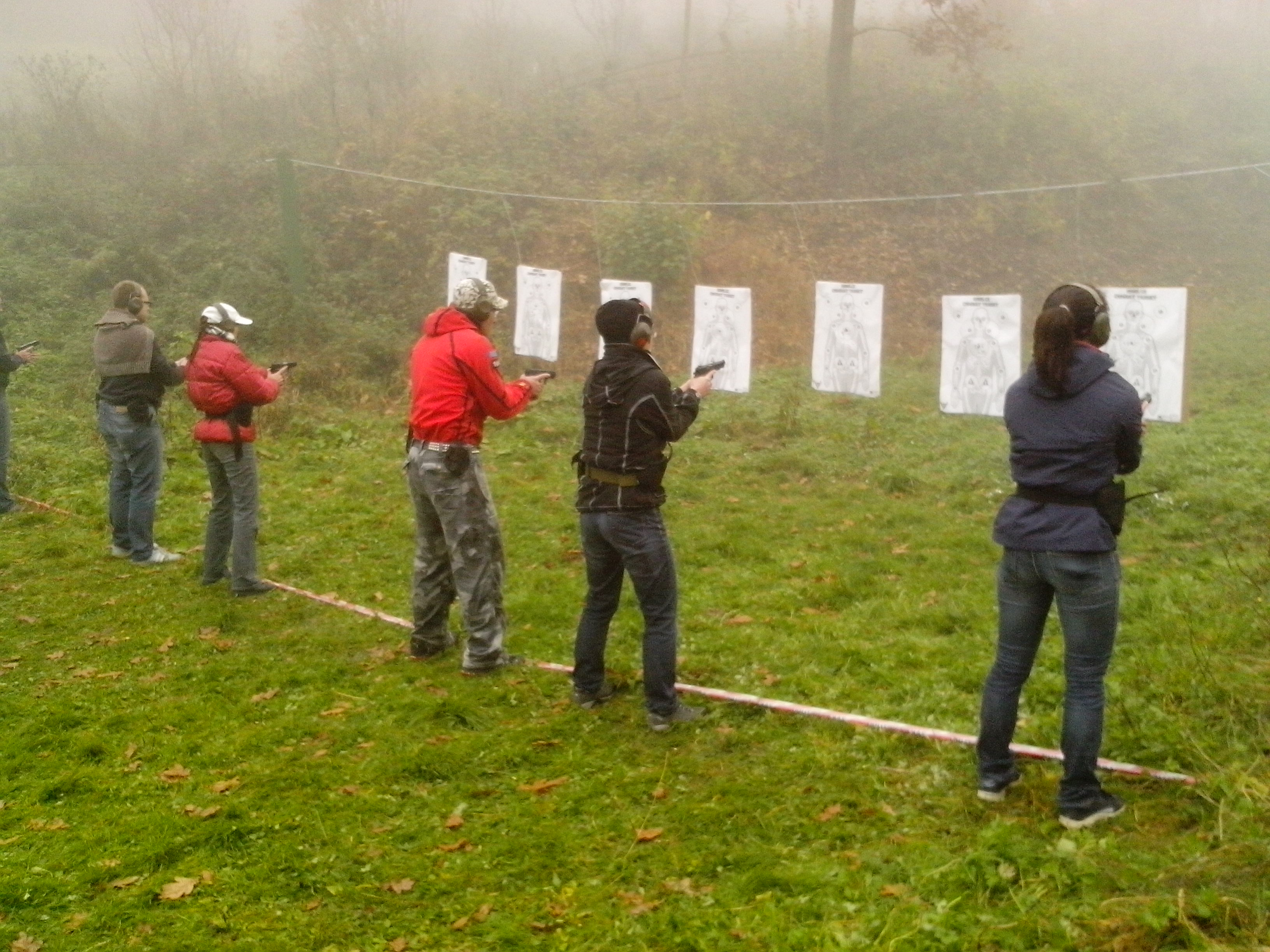
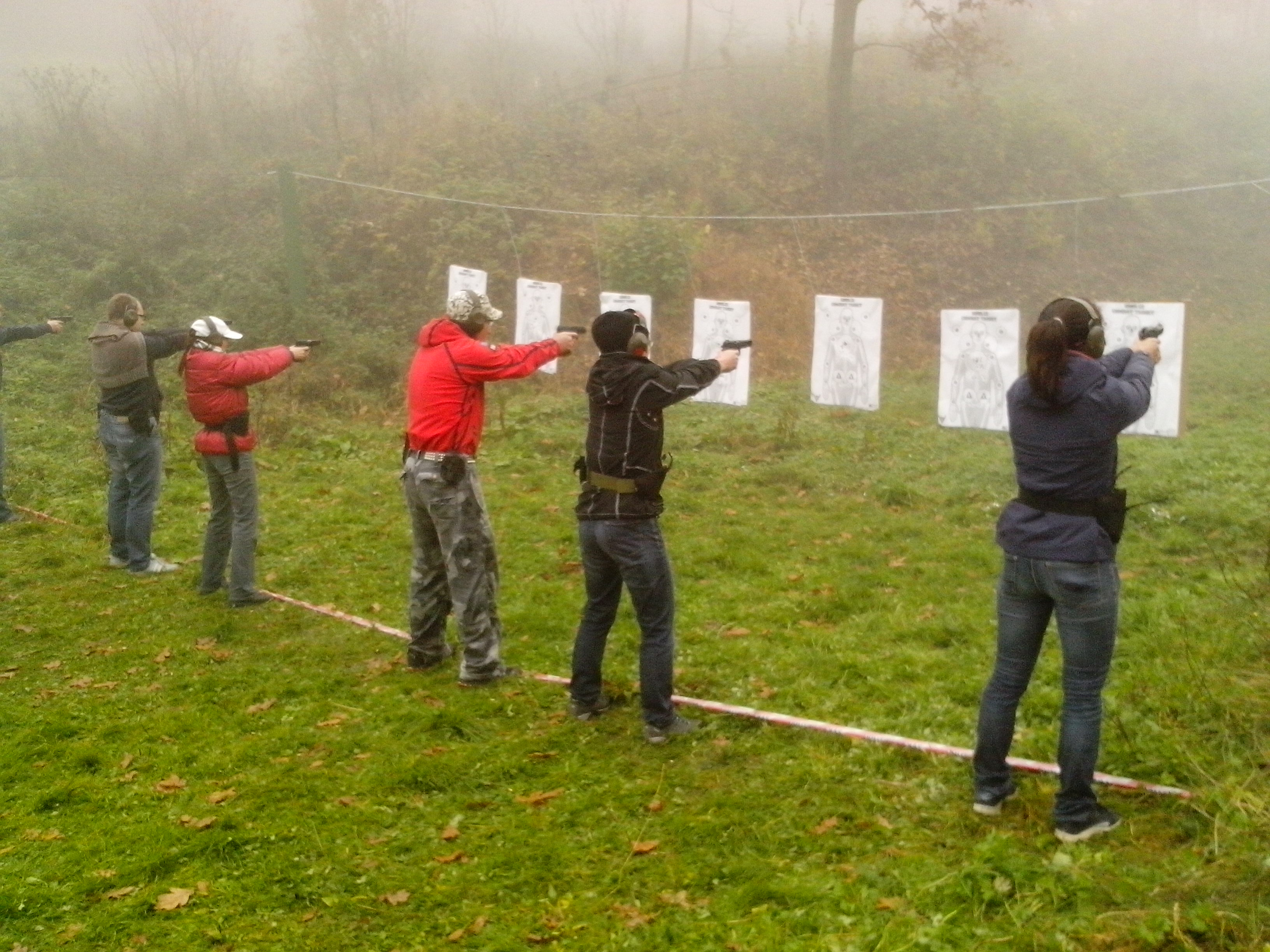
People training self-defense with firearm in the Czech Republic

Estimates over the number of defensive gun uses vary wildly, depending on the study's definition of a defensive gun use, survey design, country, population, criteria, time-period studied, and other factors. Low-end estimates for the United States are in the range of 55,000 to 80,000 incidents per year, while high end estimates reach 4.7 million per year. A May 2014 Harvard Injury Control Research Center survey about firearms and suicide committed by 150 firearms researchers found that only 8% of firearm researchers agreed that "In the United States, guns are used in self-defense far more often than they are used in crime." Discussion over the number and nature of DGU and the implications to gun control policy came to a head in the late 1990s.

Estimates of DGU from the National Crime Victimization Survey (NCVS) are consistently lower than those from other studies. A 2000 study suggested that this may be because the NCVS measures different activities than the other surveys do.

The National Self-Defense Survey and the NCVS, vary in their methods, time-frames covered, and questions asked. DGU questions were asked of all the NSDS sample. Due to screening questions in the NCVS survey, only a minority of the NCVS sample were asked a DGU question.

Lower-end estimates include that by David Hemenway, a professor of Health Policy at the Harvard School of Public Health, which estimated approximately 55,000–80,000 such uses each year.

Another survey including DGU questions was the National Survey on Private Ownership and Use of Firearms, NSPOF, conducted in 1994 by the Chiltons polling firm for the Police Foundation on a research grant from the National Institute of Justice. in 1997 NSPOF projected 4.7 million DGU per year by 1.5 million individuals after weighting to eliminate false positives. Another estimate has estimated approximately 1 million DGU incidents in the United States.

=== Kleck and Gertz, and Cook and Ludwig ===
A commonly cited 1995 study by Kleck and Gertz estimated that between 2.1 and 2.5 million DGUs occur in the United States each year. After Kleck and Gertz accounted for telescoping, their estimate was reduced to 2.1 million DGU per year. Kleck and Gertz conducted this survey in 1992, and Kleck began publicizing the 2.5 million DGU per year estimate in 1993. By 1997, the 2.5 million per year number from Kleck & Gertz' study had been cited by news articles, editorial writers, and the Congressional Research Service. Besides the NSDS and NCVS surveys, ten national and three state surveys summarized by Kleck and Gertz gave 764 thousand to 3.6 million DGU per year. In the report "Guns in America: National Survey on Private Ownership and Use of Firearms" by Philip J. Cook and Jens Ludwig, projected 4.7 million DGU which Cook and Ludwig explained by pointing out all of the NSPOF sample were asked the DGU question. Cook and Ludwig also compared the U.S. crime rate to the number of DGU reported by Kleck and similar studies and said that their estimate of DGU is improbably high.

Hemenway has asserted that Kleck and Gertz' methodology suffers from several biases leading them to overestimate the number of DGU, the social desirability bias, and the possibility that "some gun advocates will lie to help bias estimates upwards." Hemenway contends the Kleck and Gertz study is unreliable and no conclusions can be drawn from it. He argues that there are too many "false positives" in the surveys, and finds the NCVS figures more reliable, yielding estimates of around 100,000 defensive gun uses per year. Applying different adjustments, other social scientists suggest that between 250,000 and 370,000 incidents per year. In 1996, Cook and Ludwig reported that based on their analysis of the National Survey of Private Ownership of Firearms, which "incorporated a sequence of DGU questions very similar to that used by Kleck and Gertz," they estimated that 4.7 million defensive gun uses occur in the United States per year. However, they questioned whether this estimate was credible because the same survey suggests that approximately 132,000 perpetrators were either wounded or killed at the hands of armed civilians in 1994. They note that this number is about the same as the number of people hospitalized for gunshot injuries that year, but that "almost all of those are there as a result of criminal assault, suicide attempt, or accident."

Kleck asserts errors in his critics' statements that his survey's estimates of defensive gun uses linked with specific crime types, or that involved a wounding of the offender, are implausibly large compared to estimates of the total numbers of such crimes. The total number of nonfatal gunshot woundings, whether medically treated or not, is unknown, and no meaningful estimates can be derived from his survey regarding defensive gun uses linked with specific crime types, or that involved wounding the offender, because the sample sizes are too small. The fact that some crime-specific estimates derived from the Kleck survey are implausibly large is at least partly a reflection of the small samples on which they are based – no more than 196 cases. Kleck states that his estimate of total defensive gun uses was based on nearly 5,000 cases. Thus, he argues, the implausible character of some estimates of small subsets of defensive gun uses is not a valid criticism of whether estimates of the total number of defensive gun uses are implausible or too high.

Marvin Wolfgang, who was acknowledged in 1994 by the British Journal of Criminology as "the most influential criminologist in the English-speaking world", commented on Kleck's research concerning defensive gun use: "I am as strong a gun-control advocate as can be found among the criminologists in this country. [...] The Kleck and Gertz study impresses me for the caution the authors exercise and the elaborate nuances they examine methodologically. I do not like their conclusions that having a gun can be useful, but I cannot fault their methodology. They have tried earnestly to meet all objections in advance and have done exceedingly well."

A 1998 study by Philip Cook and Jens Ludwig replicated the Kleck and Gertz survey, but also concluded that the results of these surveys were far too high. A similar conclusion was reached by a 2018 RAND Corporation report, which stated that the Kleck-Gertz estimate of 2.5 million DGUs per year, and other similar estimates, "are not plausible given other information that is more trustworthy, such as the total number of U.S. residents who are injured or killed by guns each year." The same report also stated that "At the other extreme, the NCVS estimate of 116,000 DGU incidents per year almost certainly underestimates the true number," concluding that "... there is still considerable uncertainty about the prevalence of DGU".

=== National Crime Victimization Survey ===
A 1994 study examined NCVS data and concluded that between 1987 and 1990, there were approximately 258,460 incidents in which firearms were used defensively in the United States, for an annual average of 64,615. The same study said that "Firearm self-defense is rare compared with gun crimes." An article published by the Bureau of Justice Statistics, drawing its DGU from the NCVS, said: "In 1992 offenders armed with handguns committed a record 931,000 violent crimes ... On average in 1987-92 about 83,000 crime victims per year used a firearm to defend themselves or their property. Three-fourths of the victims who used a firearm for defense did so during a violent crime; a fourth, during a theft, household burglary, or motor vehicle theft." A 2013 study, also released by the BJS, found that less than 1% of nonfatal violent crime victims during the 2007–2011 period reported using a gun to defend themselves. The same study reported that "The percentage of nonfatal violent victimizations involving firearm use in self defense remained stable at under 2% from 1993 to 2011.", reporting 235,700 instances of defensive use of a firearm between 2007 and 2011

Cook and Ludwig said of the NCVS, NSPOF, and Kleck surveys: "The key explanation for the difference between the 108,000 NCVS estimate for the annual number of defensive gun uses and the several million from the surveys discussed earlier is that NCVS avoids the false-positive problem by limiting defensive gun use questions to persons who first reported that they were crime victims. Most NCVS respondents never have a chance to answer the defensive gun use question, falsely or otherwise."

Clayton Cramer and David Barnett say that such a structure could cause the NCVS to under-count defensive gun uses, because someone who has successfully defended themselves with a gun may not consider themselves a "victim of a crime." In the NCVS, if one says that they have not been a victim of a crime, the survey assumes that there was no attempted crime and does not go on to ask if they have used a gun in self-defense. According to Jens Ludwig, estimates of the frequency of DGU from the NCVS appear to be too low, but those from phone surveys (like that conducted by Kleck and Gertz) appear to be too high.

=== Lott research ===
John Lott, an economist and guns rights advocate, argues in both More Guns, Less Crime and The Bias Against Guns that media coverage of defensive gun use is rare, noting that in general, only shootings ending in fatalities are discussed in news stories. In More Guns, Less Crime, Lott writes that "[s]ince in many defensive cases a handgun is simply brandished, and no one is harmed, many defensive uses are never even reported to the police".

Attempting to quantify this phenomenon, in the first edition of the book, published in May 1998, Lott wrote that "national surveys" suggested that "98 percent of the time that people use guns defensively, they merely have to brandish a weapon to break off an attack." The higher the rate of defensive gun uses that do not end in the attacker being killed or wounded, the easier it is to explain why defensive gun uses are not covered by the media without reference to media bias. Lott cited the figure frequently in the media, including publications like The Wall Street Journal and the Los Angeles Times.

In 2002, he repeated the survey, and reported that brandishing a weapon was sufficient to stop an attack 95% of the time. Other researchers criticized his methodology, saying that his sample size of 1,015 respondents was too small for the study to be accurate and that the majority of similar studies suggest a value between 70 and 80 percent brandishment-only. Lott explained the lower brandishment-only rates found by others was at least in part due to the different questions that were asked. Most surveys used a recall period of "Ever" while some (Hart, Mauser, and Tarrance) used the previous five years. The Field Institute survey used periods of previous year, previous two years and ever. The NSPOF survey used a one-year recall period. Lott also used a one-year recall period and asked respondents about personal experiences only, due to questionable respondent recall of events past one year and respondent knowledge of DGU experiences of other household members.

=== Hemenway research ===
In 2000, David Hemenway, an advocate for gun control, published a survey which found that "Guns are used to threaten and intimidate far more often than they are used in self defense"; also that year, he published another survey which found that "criminal gun use is far more common than self-defense gun use." Both of these surveys argued that many defensive gun uses may not be in the best interests of society. Also in 2000, Hemenway and his colleagues conducted a small survey that found that guns in the home were used more often to intimidate family members (13 respondents) than in self-defense (2 respondents). The same study stated that its results suggested that most self-defense gun uses did not occur in the home, and that non-gun weapons are used more often to thwart crime than guns are. A later survey by Hemenway et al. that included 5,800 California adolescents found that about 0.3% of these adolescents reported having used a gun in self-defense, whereas, in the same study, 4% of those adolescents reported that someone had threatened them with a gun. In a 2015 study co-authored with Sara Solnick, Hemenway analyzed data from the NCVS from 2007 to 2011 and identified only 127 instances of DGU.

=== Other ===
A study published in 2013 by the Violence Policy Center, using five years of nationwide statistics (2007-2011) compiled by the Federal Bureau of Investigation estimated that defensive gun uses occur an average of 67,740 times per year. In their 2017 update, the FBI reported that guns were used in 35 criminal homicides for every defensive ("justifiable") homicide.

A 2004 study surveyed the records of a Phoenix, Arizona newspaper, as well as police and court records, and found a total of 3 instances of defensive gun use over a 3.5 month period. In contrast, Kleck and Gertz's study would predict that the police should have noticed more than 98 DGU killings or woundings and 236 DGU firings at adversaries during this time.

A 1995 study led by Arthur Kellermann, which examined 198 home invasion crimes in Atlanta, Georgia, found that in only 3 of these cases did victims use guns for self-protection. Of these three, none were injured, but one lost property. The authors concluded that "Although firearms are often kept in the home for protection, they are rarely used for this purpose."

A follow-up study in 1998 by Arthur Kellermann analyzed 626 shootings in three cities. The study found that "For every time a gun in the home was used in a self-defense or legally justifiable shooting, there were four unintentional shootings, seven criminal assaults or homicides, and 11 attempted or completed suicides."

The Gun Violence Archive, which uses a methodology of counting incidents reported and verified by law enforcement or media, reports substantially lower numbers of defensive gun use in the US than studies based on polls. 1,980 and 2,043 incidents were reported and verified in 2016 and 2017, respectively.

An interactive visualization of recent defensive gun use instances starting in 2019 is being tracked by The Heritage Foundation's Defensive Gun Uses in the U.S.^{[unfit]} Data points include date, location (city/state), context (e.g. home invasion, domestic violence, etc.), whether the gun owner held a concealed carry permit, whether multiple assailants were present, whether shots were fired, type of firearm used for defense, and miscellaneous details.

== Benefits ==
The same data indicating that DGU against criminals is uncommon also indicates that it is often effective.

A 2002 study looking at instances of DGU where convicted offenders were the defenders found that DGUs "are not likely to provide similar social benefits, implying that prevalence estimates may not simultaneously estimate social benefits." Another study published the same year found that DGU is an effective deterrent against injury for some groups of people, but not others; notable groups for whom DGU did not provide benefits in this study included women, people living in rural areas, and those living in low-income homes. A 2009 study reported that gun owners were more likely to be shot in an assault than were non-gun owners, and concluded that the chances of DGU being successful for residents of urban areas may be low. Another 2009 study of NCVS data found that DGU was "most often effective at helping the victim" in the contexts in which it occurred, with an average of 92% of victims reporting that their DGU had been beneficial for them. A 2013 National Research Council report found that studies looking at the effectiveness of different self-protective strategies had consistently found that victims who used guns defensively had lower injury rates than did victims who used other strategies. A 2015 study by Solnick and Hemenway which analyzed NCVS data reported "little evidence that [DGU] is uniquely beneficial in reducing the likelihood of injury or property loss."

== Predictors of defensive gun use ==
Individuals who use guns defensively tend not to have extremely punitive attitudes toward criminals, but people with punitive attitudes may be somewhat more likely to own guns, and, thus, to use them defensively. A 2009 study found no support for the "Southern culture of honor" hypothesis, in that no significant relationship was seen between living in the Southern United States and defensive gun use.

== See also ==
- Castle doctrine
- Justifiable homicide
- Stand-your-ground law
- DGU cases in the Czech Republic
- 2017 Chomutov incident
