= More Guns, Less Crime =

1998 non-fiction book by John Lott

- Author: John R. Lott
- Language: English
- Subject: Gun control
- Genre: Non-fiction
- Publisher: University of Chicago Press
- Publication date: June 1, 1998 (1st ed.) Jun 15, 2000 (2nd ed.) May 24, 2010 (3rd ed.)
- Publication place: United States
- Media type: Paperback (3rd ed.)
- Pages: 472 (3rd ed.)
- ISBN: 0-226-49366-0 (3rd ed.)
- OCLC: 38067725
- Dewey Decimal: 344.73/0533 21
- LC Class: KF3941 .L68 1998
- Preceded by: Straight Shooting
- Followed by: The Bias Against Guns

More Guns, Less Crime is a book by American economist John R. Lott Jr. that argues violent crime rates go down when US states pass "shall issue" concealed carry gun laws. The explanation is that criminals are deterred by the risk of attacking an armed victim. In the third and latest edition, he presents the results of his statistical analysis of crime data for every county in the United States during 29 years from 1977 to 2005. Each edition of the book was refereed by the University of Chicago Press. As of 2019, the book is no longer published by the University of Chicago Press. The book examines city, county and state level data from the entire United States and measures the impact of 13 different types of gun control laws on crime rates. The book expands on an earlier study published in 1997 by Lott and his co-author David Mustard in The Journal of Legal Studies and by Lott and his co-author John Whitley in The Journal of Law and Economics, October 2001.

== Main topics ==
Below are summaries of the main topics discussed in More Guns, Less Crime.

=== Shall issue laws ===
Lott examines the effects of shall issue laws on violent crime across the United States.

His conclusion is that shall issue laws, which allow citizens to carry concealed weapons, steadily decrease violent crime. He explains that this result makes sense because criminals are deterred by the risk of attacking an armed victim. As more citizens arm themselves, the danger to criminals increases.

=== Training requirements ===
Lott examines the effects of training requirements on crime rate and accident rate. He finds that training requirements have very little effect on both crime rates and accident rates.

=== Waiting periods ===
Lott examines the effects of waiting periods. These include limiting the time before purchasing a gun, and limiting the time before obtaining a concealed carry permit.

=== Brady Law ===
Lott examines the effects of the Brady law.

=== "Stand Your Ground" and "Castle Doctrine" Laws ===
The third edition of the book is the first study to examine Stand Your Ground and Castle Doctrine laws.

=== Other countries ===
The focus of the book is overwhelmingly on the US, but Lott does mention briefly gun ownership and crime rates in other countries, such as Great Britain, Ireland, and Jamaica, noting that murder rates rose after guns were banned. He also notes that many countries, such as Switzerland, Finland, New Zealand, and Israel, have high gun ownership rates and low crime rates, while many other countries have both low gun ownership rates and either high or low crime rates.

== Reception ==
=== Disagreement ===
Partially in response to Lott's book, a sixteen-member panel of the United States National Research Council was convened to address the issue of whether right-to-carry laws influenced crime rate. In 2001 and 2002 they also looked at many other gun control measures, including the soon-to-expire 1994 Assault Weapon Ban scheduled for renewal in 2004, gun buy-backs, and bans on handgun possession or carry. In 2004 they issued the report "Firearms and Violence: A Critical Review" which examined Lott's statistical methods in detail, including computation of the statistical uncertainties involved, and wrote:

The committee found that answers to some of the most pressing questions cannot be addressed with existing data and research methods, however well designed. Indeed, the committee was unable to find any of the laws that it examined had any effect on crime or suicide rates. In the case of right-to-carry laws, despite a large body of research, the committee found no credible evidence that the passage of right-to-carry laws decreases or increases violent crime, and there is almost no empirical evidence that the more than 80 prevention programs focused on gun-related violence have had any effect on children's behavior, knowledge, attitudes, or beliefs about firearms. The committee found that the data available on these questions are too weak to support unambiguous conclusions or strong policy statements.

The council determined that Lott's data sets can be subject to manipulation given a number of factors, so that different studies produce different results. "While the trend models show a reduction in the crime growth rate following the adoption of right-to-carry laws, these trend reductions occur long after law adoption, casting serious doubt on the proposition that the trend models estimated in the literature reflect effects of the law change."

The issue of right-to-carry laws was the only law that drew a dissent from the committee's otherwise universal findings that it could not reach a conclusion. In a very unusual dissent for National Research Council reports, criminologist James Q. Wilson wrote that:

The direct evidence that such shooting sprees occur is nonexistent. The indirect evidence, as found in papers by Black and Nagin and Ayres and Donohue [cited in Chapter 6], is controversial. Indeed, the Ayres and Donohue paper shows that there was a "statistically significant downward shift in the trend" of the murder rate (Chapter 6, page 135). This suggests to me that for people interested in RTC laws, the best evidence we have is that they impose no costs but may confer benefits. ... In sum, I find that the evidence presented by Lott and his supporters suggests that RTC laws do in fact help drive down the murder rate, though their effect on other crimes is ambiguous.

=== Support ===
A conference organized by the Center for Law, Economics, and Public Policy at Yale Law School and held at American Enterprise Institute was published in a special issue of The Journal of Law and Economics. Academics of all interests in the debate were invited to participate and provide refereed empirical research. As follows are some papers from that conference supported Lott's conclusions.

- Bruce L. Benson, Florida State University, and Brent D. Mast, American Enterprise Institute, "Privately Produced General Deterrence", The Journal of Law and Economics, October 2001.
- John R. Lott, Jr, "The Concealed-Handgun Debate," Journal of Legal Studies, January 1998.
- Florenz Plassmann, State University of New York at Binghamton, and T. Nicolaus Tideman, Virginia Polytechnic Institute and State University, "Does the right to carry concealed handguns deter countable crimes? Only a count analysis can say", The Journal of Law and Economics, October 2001.
- Carlisle E. Moody, College of William and Mary, "Testing for the effects of concealed weapons laws: Specification errors and robustness," The Journal of Law and Economics, October 2001.
- David E. Olson, Loyola University Chicago, and Michael D. Maltz, University of Illinois at Chicago, "Right-to-carry concealed weapons laws and homicide in large U.S. counties: the effect on weapon types, victim characteristics, and victim-offender relationships," The Journal of Law and Economics, October 2001. They found "a decrease in total homicides."
- David B. Mustard, University of Georgia, "The Impact of Gun Laws on Police Deaths," The Journal of Law and Economics, October 2001.
- John R. Lott, Jr and John Whitley, "Safe-Storage Gun Laws: Accidental Deaths, Suicides, and Crime," The Journal of Law and Economics, October 2001.
- T. B. Marvell, Justec Research, "The Impact of Banning Juvenile Gun Possession," The Journal of Law and Economics, October 2001. Marvell found evidence that right-to-carry laws reduced rape rates.

Other refereed empirical academic studies besides the original paper with David Mustard that have supported Lott's conclusions include the following.

- William Alan Bartley and Mark A. Cohen, Vanderbilt University, "The Effect of Concealed Weapons Laws: An Extreme Bound Analysis", Economic Inquiry, 1998.
- Stephen G. Bronars, University of Texas, and John R. Lott, Jr., "Criminal Deterrence, Geographic Spillovers, and Right-to-Carry Concealed Handguns", American Economic Review, May 1998.
- John R. Lott, Jr and John Whitley, University of Adelaide, "Abortion and Crime: Unwanted Children and Out-of-Wedlock Births," Economic Inquiry, April 2007.
- John R. Lott, Jr and John Whitley, University of Adelaide, "A Note on the Use of County-Level UCR Data," Journal of Quantitative Criminology, October 2001.
- Florenz Plassmann, State University of New York at Binghamton, and John Whitley, University of Adelaide, 'Confirming "More Guns, Less Crime"', Stanford Law Review, 2003.
- Eric Helland, Claremont-McKenna College and Alexander Tabarrok, George Mason University, 'Using Placebo Laws to Test "More Guns, Less Crime",' The B.E. Journal of Economic Analysis & Policy, 2008.
- Carlisle E. Moody, College of William and Mary, and Thomas B. Marvell, Justec Research, "The Debate on Shall-Issue Laws", Econ Journal Watch, 2008.
- Carlisle E. Moody and Thomas B. Marvell, "The Debate on Shall-Issue Laws," Econ Journal Watch, September 2008
- Carlisle E. Moody and Thomas B. Marvell, " On the Choice of Control Variables in the Crime Equation," Oxford Bulletin of Economics and Statistics, October 2010
- Carlisle E. Moody, Thomas B. Marvell, Paul R Zimmerman, and Fasil Alemante, "The Debate on Shall-Issue Laws," Review of Economics & Finance, 2014
- Donald J. Lacombe and Amanda Ross, "Revisiting the Question 'More Guns, Less Crime?' New Estimates Using Spatial Econometric Techniques," Social Science Research Network, 2014.
- Mark Gius, "An examination of the effects of concealed weapons laws and assault weapons bans on state-level murder rates," Applied Economics Letters, 2014.

=== Opposition ===
Some academic studies that have rejected Lott's conclusions include the following. Virtually all of these studies contend that there seems to be little or no effect on crime from the passage of license-to-carry laws. One by Ayres and Donohue, published in 2003, finds a temporary increase in aggravated assaults. The authors of the book Freakonomics report "troubling allegation that Lott actually invented some of the survey data that supports his theory" and that other scholars couldn't replicate his results (a court later dismissed Lott's defamation claim against the authors).

- Rutgers sociology professor Ted Goertzel stated that "Lott's massive data set was simply unsuitable for his task", and that he "compar[ed] trends in Idaho and West Virginia and Mississippi with trends in Washington, D.C. and New York City" without proper statistical controls. He points out that econometric methods (such as the Lott & Mustard RTC study or the Levitt & Donohue abortion study) are susceptible to misuse and can even become junk science.
- Hemenway, David (2006). Private guns, public health. Ann Arbor: University of Michigan Press. ISBN 978-0-472-02382-0.
- Ian Ayres, Yale Law School, and John Donohue III, Stanford Law School, "Shooting Down the More Guns, Less Crime Hypothesis," Stanford Law Review, 2003. This study found a temporary increase in aggravated assaults.
- Webster et al., "Flawed gun policy research could endanger public safety", American Journal of Public Health, 1997.
- Jens Ludwig, Georgetown University, "Concealed-Gun-Carrying Laws and Violent Crime: Evidence from State Panel Data", International Review of Law and Economics, 1998.
- Dan Black and Daniel Nagin, "Do 'Right-to-Carry' Laws Deter Violent Crime?" Journal of Legal Studies, (January 1998).
- Hashem Dezhbakhsh and Paul H. Rubin, "Lives Saved or Lives Lost? The Effects of Concealed-Handgun Laws on Crime," The American Economic Review, 1998.
- Mark Duggan, University of Chicago, "More Guns, More Crime," National Bureau of Economic Research, NBER Working Paper No. W7967, October 2000, later published in Journal of Political Economy.
- David E. Olson and Michael D. Maltz, "Right‐to‐Carry Concealed Weapon Laws and Homicide in Large U.S. Counties: The Effect on Weapon Types, Victim Characteristics, and Victim‐Offender Relationships," The Journal of Law & Economics, 2001. This study found mixed results as to whether right-to-carry laws were associated with similar effects as reported by Lott and Mustard or not.
- Grant Duwe, Tomislav Kovandzic, and Carlisle E. Moody, "The Impact of Right-to-Carry Concealed Firearm Laws on Mass Public Shootings" Homicide Studies 4 (2002).
- Tomislav V. Kovandzic and Thomas B. Marvell, "Right-to-Carry Concealed Firearms and Violent Crime: Crime Control Through Gun Decontrol?" Criminology and Public Policy 2, (2003).
- John J. Donahue III, Stanford Law School, 'The Final Bullet in the Body of the More Guns, Less Crime Hypothesis', Criminology and Public Policy, 2003.
- Tomislav V. Kovandzic, Thomas B. Marvell and Lynne M. Vieraitis, "The Impact of "Shall-Issue" Concealed Handgun Laws on Violent Crime Rates: Evidence From Panel Data for Large Urban Cities" Homicide Studies (2005): 292–323.
- Michael D. Maltz and Joseph Targonski, "Measurement and Other Errors in County-Level UCR Data: A Reply to Lott and Whitley," Journal of Quantitative Criminology June 2003: 199-206.
- Lisa Hepburn, Matthew Miller, Deborah Azrael, and David Hemenway "The effect of nondiscretionary concealed weapon carrying laws on homicide", Journal of Trauma March 2004: 676-81.
- Robert A. Martin Jr. and Richard L. Legault, "Systematic Measurement Error with State-Level Crime Data: Evidence from the "More Guns, Less Crime" Debate," Journal of Research in Crime and Delinquency May 2005: 187–210.
- Rosengart et al., "An evaluation of state firearm regulations and homicide and suicide death rates," Injury Prevention 2005: 77–83.
- Patricia Grambsch, "Regression to the Mean, Murder Rates, and Shall-Issue Laws," The American Statistician (2008).
- Benjamin French and Patrick J. Heagerty, "Analysis of Longitudinal Data to Evaluate a Policy Change", Statistics in Medicine October 30, 2008: 5005–5025. This study concluded that "enacting a shall-issue law is associated with a weak but non-significant increase in firearm-related homicide rates."
- John Donohue and Ian Ayres. "More Guns, Less Crime Fails Again: The Latest Evidence from 1977–2006" Econ Journal Watch (2009): 218–238.
- Hoskin, Anthony (March 2011). "Household gun prevalence and rates of violent crime: a test of competing gun theories". Criminal Justice Studies. 24 (1): 125–136. doi:10.1080/1478601X.2011.544445. S2CID 144072789.
- Aneja, A.; Donohue, J. J.; Zhang, A. (29 October 2011). "The Impact of Right-to-Carry Laws and the NRC Report: Lessons for the Empirical Evaluation of Law and Policy" (PDF). American Law and Economics Review. 13 (2): 565–631. doi:10.1093/aler/ahr009.
- Wolfgang Stroebe, "Firearm possession and violent death: A critical review," Aggression and Violent Behavior, 2013.
- Sripal Bangalore and Franz Messerli, "Gun Ownership and Firearm-related Deaths," The American Journal of Medicine, 2013.
- Kesteren, John van; Dijk, Jan van; Mayhew, Pat (January 2014). "The International Crime Victims Surveys". International Review of Victimology. 20 (1): 49–69. doi:10.1177/0269758013511742. S2CID 145082706.
- Manski & Pepper, "How Do Right-to-Carry Laws Affect Crime Rates? Coping with Ambiguity Using Bounded-Variation Assumptions", Review of Economics and Statistics, 2015.
- Steven N. Durlauf, Salvador Navarro, David A. Rivers, "Model uncertainty and the effect of shall-issue right-to-carry laws on crime," European Economic Review, 2016.

== Editions ==
There have been three editions of More Guns, Less Crime: Understanding Crime and Gun Control Laws, all published by University of Chicago Press. As of 2019, this book is no longer published by the University of Chicago Press:

- First edition, 1998, ISBN 978-0-226-49363-3
- Second edition, 2000, ISBN 978-0-226-49364-0
- Third edition, 2010, ISBN 978-0-226-49366-4

== See also ==
- Gun violence in the United States
- Gun politics in the United States
- The Bias Against Guns – A related book by John Lott, suggesting that psychological bias prevents some from accepting the results of his study.
- Private Guns, Public Health
- Carrying concealed weapons
