= Freedomnomics =

2007 non-fiction book by John Lott

Freedomnomics: Why the Free Market Works and Other Half-Baked Theories Don't
- Hardcover edition
- Author: John R. Lott
- Language: English
- Genre: Non-fiction
- Publisher: Regnery Publishing
- Publication date: June 25, 2007
- Publication place: United States
- Media type: Hardcover
- ISBN: 978-1-59698-506-3
- OCLC: 87758440
- Dewey Decimal: 330.12/2 22
- LC Class: HB95 .L68 2007
- Preceded by: The Bias Against Guns

Freedomnomics: Why the Free Market Works and Other Half-Baked Theories Don't is a book by writer and public policy researcher John R. Lott, Jr., author of previous works More Guns, Less Crime and The Bias Against Guns. Freedomnomics takes an economic look at the effects of the free market, and presents some arguments against those found in Freakonomics by Steven D. Levitt and Stephen J. Dubner. The publications The American and National Review ran positive reviews, with critic Robert VerBruggen stating that Lott "renders lots of charts, graphs and statistical analysis into clear, uncomplicated conversation."

In the book, Lott argues that right-to-carry laws in the U.S. have contributed to reduced rates of gun violence, that the public availability of abortion causes a rise of illegitimacy, and that female suffrage has led to government growth, among other viewpoints. Lott generally takes a conservative and libertarian perspective.

== Background ==
Lott had previously sued Freakonomics co-author Steven Levitt for libel, based on Levitt's statement that other researchers "haven’t been able to replicate" Lott's controversial studies that find that gun deaths decline after concealed-carry laws are put into effect. A judge dismissed Lott's complaint.

Readings in Applied Microeconomics: The Power of the Market, a work edited by Craig Newmark and published by the Taylor & Francis Group, later excerpted sections from Freedomnomics in 2009.

== Topics ==
=== Academia ===
In a discussion of incentives, Lott refers to an event at Montana State University when the state proposed to abolish property taxes. Lott asserts that University professors knew that ending the tax was a good economic policy, but opposed the proposed law because it had the potential to reduce government funding to their University.

=== Gas prices ===
Lott argues that oil and gas companies have incentives to stabilize the prices of gas and that such stability would benefit consumers in the long run. He asserts that the increases in gas prices during Hurricane Katrina actually helped mitigate the adverse impacts of the hurricane. He says that if government price controls, like those of the 1970s, had been enacted, they would have made life much harder for the victims.

=== Drug prices ===
Lott asserts that Americans pay more for medications than other countries and that the additional expense paid by Americans is used to fund the research necessary to invent those drugs. If Americans did not pay high prices for drugs, he claims, then no new drugs would be created. Lott asserts that government price controls on drugs would destroy medical innovation, not only for the United States, but also for other countries who are dependent on the United States for new drugs.

=== Used car vs. new car prices ===
Lott argues against the widely held belief that a new car loses 15–25% of its value as soon as it leaves the new car dealer's lot. He cites published estimates of new and certified used car prices using manufacturer's suggested retail price (MSRP); Kelley Blue Book prices; and Yahoo! Auto Certified Used prices for 55 certified used cars (15 with less than 5,000 miles and 40 with about 15,000 miles). A few of the cars with less than 5,000 miles were actually worth more than MSRP.

=== Campaign finance reform ===
Lott claims that laws which limit money donated to politicians gives an advantage to incumbents. He also asserts that these laws redirect money from politicians to political action committees, thereby increasing the occurrence of negative campaigning.

=== Reputation ===
Lott makes an argument that reputations are an important, and often overlooked, asset in the economy. He gives examples of how hurt reputations can be more damaging than penalties imposed by law.

=== Professional licensing ===
Lott asserts that professional licensing prevents the highest quality entrants from entering professions from barbering to practicing law. He points out that even though he has been a university professor for many years, he is not legally able to teach at public high schools in most states because of government regulations.

=== Crime ===
Lott discusses the economics behind the changing levels of crime across the United States. He asserts that affirmative action in police hiring has caused an increase in crime and argues that the death penalty, citizens with concealed weapons carry permits have worked to decrease crime. He also writes that gun control regulations have had little effect on the crime rate.

=== Women's suffrage ===
Lott states that women's suffrage has led to an increase in the size and scope of government in the US, and that states that gave women the vote increased spending afterwards compared to others.

=== Voting ===
Lott discusses factors that he believes affect voter turnout and voter fraud in the United States. These include older examples such as the poll tax, secret ballots, and literacy tests and recent examples such as voting machines, felony voting, the 2000 Florida vote, public schools and alleged bias in the media.

== Reviews ==
Robert VerBruggen, an assistant editor at The Washington Times, praised the book by stating that it "entertains, educates and argues forcefully." He referred to Lott as "a great writer, especially for the general public" and remarked that Lott's work "renders lots of charts, graphs and statistical analysis into clear, uncomplicated conversation." He also wrote, "Scholar wars may seem petty at times, but this book shows they lead to some worthwhile endeavors."

Academic Michael New, writing in the National Review, ran a supportive review that read "Lott successfully engages a number of current political debates and succeeds in making a number of cogent and well researched arguments in favor of free markets."

== See also ==
- 2007 in literature
- Freakonomics
- SuperFreakonomics
- The Bias Against Guns
