= Duve =

Duve is a German language variant spelling of the surname Duwe that stems from the Low Germanic düwe (dove), a metonymic occupational name for someone who bred or sold doves. Notable people with the surname include:

- Christian de Duve (1917–2013), Nobel Prize-winning Belgian cytologist and biochemist
- Freimut Duve (1936–2020), German politician
- Karen Duve (born 1961), German author
- Thierry de Duve (born 1944), Belgian professor of modern art theory
- Vanessa Duve, German fashion model
