= DGU =

DGU may refer to:

- Defensive gun use
- Dictionary of general usage
- Dongguk University, South Korea
