= David Mustard =

David Mustard may refer to:

- David Mustard (tennis), tennis player from New Zealand
- David Mustard (economist), American economist
- Dave Mustaine, American musician
