= Carlisle Moody =

American economist

Carlisle Eaton Moody Jr.
- Born: May 2, 1943 (age 83)

Academic background
- Education: Colby College, University of Connecticut

Academic work
- Discipline: Economics, criminology
- Institutions: College of William & Mary

Carlisle E. Moody (born May 2, 1943) is an American economist, criminologist, and professor of economics at the College of William & Mary.

== Education ==
Moody received his B.A. from Colby College and his M.A. (1966) and Ph.D. (1970) from the University of Connecticut, all in economics.

== Research ==
Moody has done research on the relationship between gun laws and crime. He has also published studies pertaining to other subjects in the field of criminology, such as the effectiveness of increasing the prison population on crime rates. In a 1995 study in the journal Criminology, Moody and his colleague Thomas Marvell reported that they found little evidence that sentence enhancements for gun crimes were effective at reducing crime rates or gun use. Marvell and Moody have also conducted studies on the effect of three-strikes laws, which, according to their research, are associated with higher homicide rates. Their results were originally published in 2001 and replicated the following year. In a 2002 study, Moody, along with Grant Duwe and Tomislav Kovandzic, found very little, if any, evidence that right-to-carry laws affected the number of mass shootings. In 2008, he co-authored a study, along with Dave Kopel, that found that countries with higher gun ownership rates tend to have higher levels of political and civil freedom.

== Views ==
Moody has said that right-to-carry laws lead to lower crime rates. The National Research Council in 2004 were undecided on the topic. His research on the subject suggests that such laws deter crime but only slightly.

He has said that his research suggests that states with higher prison populations have lower crime rates. In 2000, he told The Washington Post, "The fact is, if you put people in jail, it helps."
