= Designated Reserves (Czech Republic) =

Czech militia-style training program for firearm owners

Designated Reserves

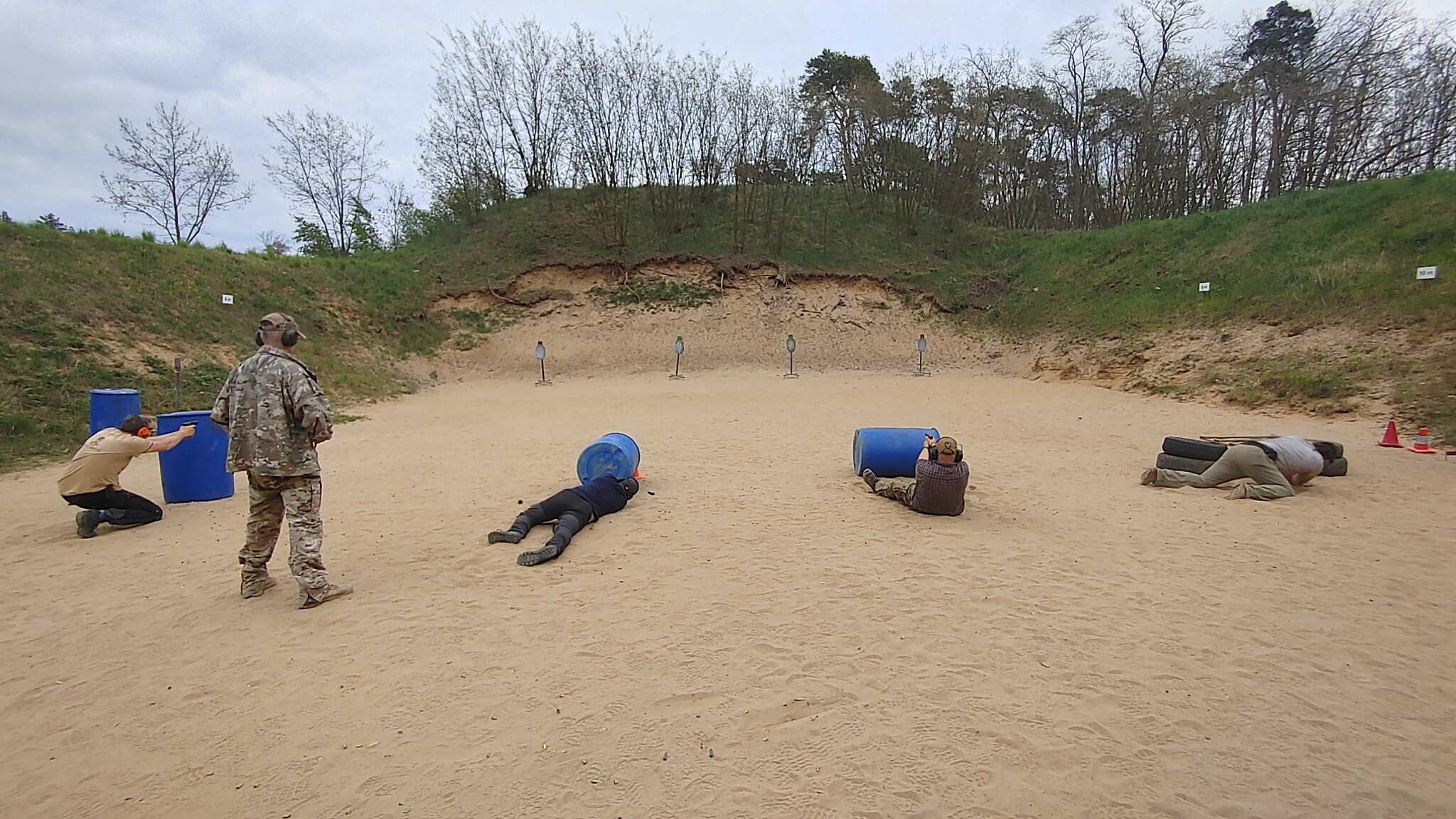
Level 1 training - shooting from concealment.

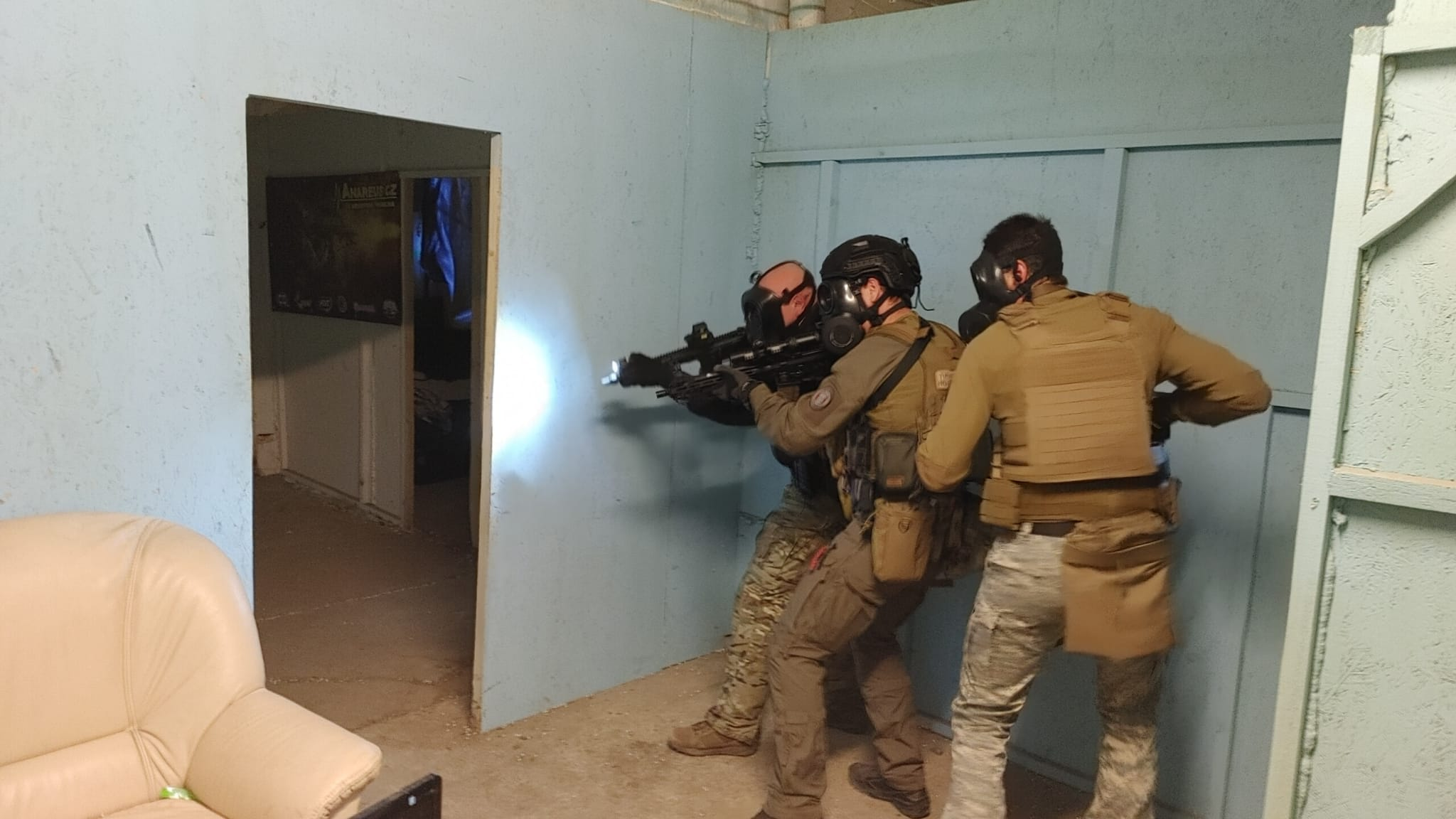
Level 3 training - teamwork elimination of active shooter (FX simmunition CQB combat).

Search and rescue exercise in a Nature Reserve Český Kras.

Designated Reserves of the State (Czech: Stanovené zálohy státu) is a militia-style training program provided to civilian firearm owners under auspices of the Government of the Czech Republic. The program provides practical shooting training to participants in different levels, focused on individual defensive gun use, soft targets protection, defense against active attacker, and use of firearm during state of emergency. Members of the Designated Reserve may be called up with their private firearms as reinforcement of emergency services, and, apart from the basic level participants, receive free ammunition (or reimbursement thereof) for their shooting training.

== Legal basis ==
Designated Reserves Act
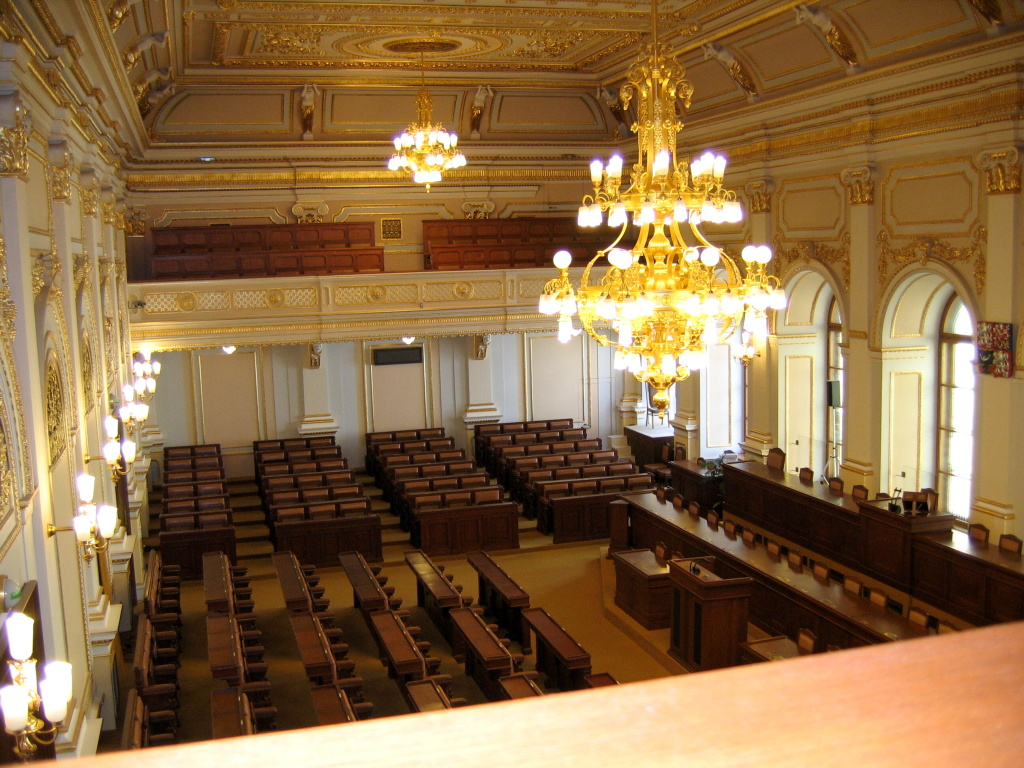

Parliament of the Czech Republic
- Long title: Act on the handling of weapons in certain cases affecting the internal order or security of the Czech Republic
- Citation: No. 14/2021 Coll.
- Passed by: Chamber of Deputies
- Passed: 26 October 2020
- Passed by: Senate
- Passed: 17 December 2020
- Signed by: President Miloš Zeman
- Signed: 21 December 2020
- Commenced: 30 January 2021

Legislative history

Initiating chamber: Chamber of Deputies
- Bill citation: Chamber Bill No. 669 (8th Legislature)
- Introduced by: Deputy Jiří Mašek (politician) and 23 other deputies
- Rapporteur: Jana Černochová
- Introduced: 6 December 2019
- Distributed to members: 6 December 2019
- Committee responsible: Security Committee
- First reading: 3 June 2020
- Second reading: 7 October 2020
- Third reading: 23 October 2020
- Voting summary: 89 voted for; None voted against; 3 abstained

Revising chamber: Senate
- Received from the Chamber of Deputies: 24 November 2020
- Rapporteur: Václav Láska
- Committee responsible: Foreign Affairs, Defence and Security Committee
- Passed: 17 December 2020
- Voting summary: 64 voted for; None voted against; 6 abstained

Related legislation
- Government Regulation No. 255/2022, on the implementation of the Act on the handling of weapons in certain cases affecting the internal order or security of the Czech Republic
- Status: In force

Along with the 2021 Firearms Act Amendment, the Parliament passed also an Act No. 14/2021 Coll., on the handling of weapons in certain cases affecting the internal order or security of the Czech Republic. The Act's number 14/21 symbolically refers to the 600th anniversary of civilian firearms possession in the country. The legislation establishes "a system of firearms training, the purpose of which is to improve the knowledge, abilities and skills of persons authorised to handle firearms for the purpose of ensuring internal order or the security of the Czech Republic".

Details regarding the Designated Reserve and system of firearms training are dealt with in Government Regulation No. 255/2021. Within the system, private companies approved by the authorities provide advanced shooting training to firearm owners that have expanded (concealed carry) type of authorization. After passing a set of requirements and taking an oath, the participants become part of the Designated Reserve of the State, whereby they may be called up with their private firearms to support the work of police or armed forces in a crisis event. While the law anticipates founding of firearms training for both internal security as well as defense, as of 2023 only the former was in place.

== Training under auspices of Ministry of Interior ==
Firearms training for purposes of internal security consists of three general and one additional level. The training is provided by specifically licensed private companies and conducted under auspices of the Ministry of Interior. Participants become members of the designated reserve after accomplishing all Level 1 requirements, including oath taking.

For Level 2 and higher, the ammunition cost is reimbursed by the Government and selected parts of the training may be conducted by mutual combat with use of simunition.

Level	Main focus	Extent	Content
1	General defensive gun use	8 hours theoretical	Law, deescalation, tactics, practicalities of concealed carry, analysis of real DGU situations, first aid
1	General defensive gun use	8 hours practical	250 rds of ammunition Pistol or rifle Shooting from various positions, on move, from concealment, firearm failures, etc.
1	General defensive gun use	Shooting test	A stage similar to IPSC
1	General defensive gun use	Taking oath	I pledge allegiance to the Czech Republic. - I promise that as a citizen and patriot I will respect the principles of the democratic rule of law and will selflessly perform the tasks that will be imposed on me as a member of the Designated Reserves of the State. - I promise to act responsibly, courageously and modestly in the performance of the tasks of the Designated Reserves of the State and in civic life. - If necessary, I will resolutely endure the discomfort and dangers involved. - I promise to always exemplify the principles of safe handling of weapons."
Designated reserve
2	Soft targets protection and defense against active killer	8 hours theoretical	Best practices, safe handling in public spaces, aftermath, analysis of real cases, first aid in mass casualty incident, proper response to discovery of explosives, etc.
2	Soft targets protection and defense against active killer	8 hours practical	Pistol, 150 rounds, up to 50 meters. Complex decision making situations, moving and disappearing targets, one-handed shooting, transitioning between pistol and rifle, etc.
2	Soft targets protection and defense against active killer	8 hours practical	Rifle, 150 rounds, up to 100 meters. Similar as pistol above.
3	State of Emergency	8 hours theoretical	Law, tasks of state services and private individuals, command and coordination, civil defense, use of body armor and CBRN equipment, first aid in state of emergency situations
3	State of Emergency	12 hours practical	Pistol, 300 rounds, up to 50 meters, in body armor
3	State of Emergency	12 hours practical	Rifle, 300 rounds, up to 300 meters, in body armor
4	Individual training	Members of the Designated Reserve shall each receive 500 rounds (or reimbursement of 500 rounds) annually which they are bound to use for individual training.	

== Training under auspices of Ministry of Defense ==
The legislation anticipates establishment of courses for internal security under auspices of the Ministry of Interior, and for state defense purposes under auspices of Ministry of Defense. As of 2026, only the former has been established.
