= Marc Gertz =

American criminologist

- Education: Bucknell University (B.A., 1968), Baruch College (M.P.A., 1971), University of Connecticut (Ph.D., 1976)
- Scientific career
- Fields: Criminology
- Institutions: Florida State University
- Thesis: Organizational politics in felony cases: justice in five Connecticut courts (1976)
- Academic advisors: George F. Cole, Fred Kort, David Repass

Marc G. Gertz is an American criminologist and professor at the Florida State University College of Criminology and Criminal Justice. His research includes an influential 1995 survey he conducted with his Florida State University colleague, Gary Kleck, on the frequency of defensive gun use.

He has also researched the arrest rate among National Football League players relative to the general population, as well as the relationship between the number of penalties these players receive during games and the number of times those players are arrested.
