= The Bias Against Guns =

2003 non-fiction book by John Lott

The Bias Against Guns: Why Almost Everything You've Heard About Gun Control Is Wrong
- Author: John Lott
- Language: English
- Genre: Gun politics in the United States
- Publisher: Regnery Publishing, Inc.
- Publication date: March 25, 2003
- Publication place: United States
- Media type: Hardback
- Pages: 349
- ISBN: 0-89526-114-6
- OCLC: 51095536
- Dewey Decimal: 363.3/3/0973 21
- LC Class: HV7436 .L68 2003
- Preceded by: More Guns, Less Crime
- Followed by: Freedomnomics

The Bias Against Guns: Why Almost Everything You've Heard About Gun Control Is Wrong is a book by John Lott, following up on his controversial More Guns, Less Crime. It is intended to reach a broader audience than its highly technical predecessor. Lott explores what he sees as misconceptions about gun ownership, including the practice of carrying concealed weapons.

== Main topics ==
The Bias Against Guns has two parts. The first explains what Lott believes is the source of false information about gun ownership. The second examines the issues regarding gun ownership, paying specific attention to topics that often arise in debates over gun politics.

== Reception ==
Lott's book has been well received by those in the pro-gun lobby and amongst conservatives more generally. Two reviewers on the website National Rifle Association's Institute for Legal Action describe how Lott's book:

has thrown a monkey wrench into the plans to disarm civilians. Readers who understand human nature and the mechanism of deterrence will find validation for everything they have intuitively known. As Lott has done in the past, he does so again with an unparalleled intensity.

Lott discussed the book in an April 2004 event held by the Frontiers of Freedom Institute, which was broadcast on C-SPAN.

The book has been criticized by the some members of scientific community. John V. Pepper, Professor of Economics at the University of Virginia, wrote that "Lott distorts anecdotal evidence about biases, misrepresents the relevant empirical literature, and presents evidence that cannot be used to draw credible conclusions about the effects of gun laws on crime." Similarly, David Hemenway, director of the Harvard Injury Control Research Center, concludes that "Much that Lott writes is either wrong or misleading."

== See also ==
- Private Guns, Public Health
- Gun control
- Second Amendment to the United States Constitution
