= David Mustard (economist) =

American economist

David B. Mustard
- Born: September 18, 1968 (age 58); Buffalo, New York
- Spouse: Elizabeth Mustard
- Children: 5 (David Mustard III, Stephen Mustard, Mary Mustard, James Mustard, Hannah Mustard)

Academic background
- Education: University of Rochester; University of Edinburgh; University of Chicago

Academic work
- Discipline: Microeconomics; Economic policy
- Institutions: University of Georgia
- Awards: Terry College of Business Teacher of the Year
- Website: Information at IDEAS / RePEc

David Brendan Mustard (born September 18, 1968, in Buffalo, New York) is an American economist and the Josiah Meigs Distinguished Teaching Professor of economics at the University of Georgia's Terry College of Business.

== Research ==
In 1997, when he was a graduate student at the University of Chicago, Mustard co-authored an influential study with John Lott, examining the effects of right-to-carry laws, which make it easier to obtain a concealed handgun license. The study concluded that these laws reduce violent crime rates, without increasing accidental firearm deaths. This study has been criticized by other researchers, including Ian Ayres and John J. Donohue.

With Earl Grinols, Mustard has also researched the economic effects of gambling on crime, jobs, and tax revenues.
