= Private Guns, Public Health =

Book by David Hemenway

- Author: David Hemenway
- Language: English
- Subject: Gun politics, Gun violence
- Genre: Non-fiction
- Publisher: University of Michigan Press
- Publication place: United States

Private Guns, Public Health is a 2004 policy opinion book by David Hemenway, an economist who has served as Professor of Health Policy at the Harvard School of Public Health as well as the Director of Harvard's Injury Control Research Center. He argues that the widespread ownership of firearms in private hands in the U.S. promotes the spread of the "disease" of gun violence, and he takes a collective interpretation of the Second Amendment while stating that increased regulations are absolutely necessary in the purposes of public safety. Hemenway makes the central case that "more guns in a community lead to more homicide". He published the book through the University of Michigan Press in 2004. A new edition was released, also by the University of Michigan Press, in 2017.

== Contents ==
Hemenway interprets the issues of gun violence and gun politics in the U.S. through a public health lens, which he believes "emphasizes prevention rather than fault-finding, blame, or revenge." He writes that he is not "anti-gun" or "anti-gun owner" any more than people who advocate for consumer safety measures in cars are "anti-cars." He sums the goal of the book up as "injury prevention".

He states that no "credible evidence exists for a general deterrent effect of firearms" since "arming citizens to reduce crime- in the home, in schools, or on the streets- seems likely to increase rather than reduce the level of lethal violence". He also asserts that "the safety of guns is less regulated than virtually any other commodity". Overall, he remarks, "We should no longer accept our high levels of lethal violence as an inevitable by-product of a free American society."

He specifically criticizes the work of academic researchers John Lott, Jr. and Gary Kleck, both of which have published criminological studies finding no reason to think that the spread of guns leads to more crime. Hemenway argues as well that the correct interpretation of the Second Amendment is that "rights should be determined and disputes resolved not through private judgment of each individual backed by private force but rather by the public judgment of the community." He criticizes the mythos of American frontier individualism as separate from the reality of "a hired hand with a borrowed horse, a mean streak, and syphilis".

Hemenway writes in the conclusion, "The public health approach is not about banning guns. It is about creating policies that will prevent violence and injuries." Thus, he argues for federal regulations such as specific licensing of gun owners and registration programs, one-gun-per-month laws to prevent straw purchasers, background checks, and greater scrutiny of the gun manufacturing industry in a manner like the National Highway Traffic Safety Administration's role with transportation businesses.

== Reviews ==
This image shows homicides by weapon type, from 1976 to 2004, in the U.S.

Paul Helmke, a past president of the Brady Campaign to Prevent Gun Violence, praised the "excellent book" in an article in The Huffington Post. He commented, "If more of the debate and discussion about guns and gun violence were handled with the clear, studious, and fact-based approach of David Hemenway, we'd be a lot more likely to reach agreement on common-sense steps to make all our communities safer." Suspense novelist Richard North Patterson referred to the book as a "lucid and penetrating study" and lauded it as "essential reading for anyone who wishes to understand the tragedy of gun violence in America".

Richard F. Corlin, a past president of the American Medical Association, stated that "Hemenway has produced a masterwork". Corlin remarked about Hemenway as well, "Consideration and adoption of the policy lessons he recommends would strengthen the Constitutional protections that all of our citizens have to life, liberty, and the pursuit of happiness". Jerome P. Kassirer, a past editor-in-chief emeritus of the New England Journal of Medicine, praised what he viewed as the books "scholarly, sober analytic assessments", and he commented that "Hemenway constructs a convincing case that firearm availability is a critical and proximal cause of unparalleled carnage."

== See also ==
- 2004 in literature
- Gun politics in the United States
- Gun violence in the United States
- More Guns, Less Crime
