= Duwe =

Duwe, from the Low Germanic düwe (dove), is a surname, a metonymic occupational name for someone who bred or sold doves. Notable people with the surname include:

- Grant Duwe (born 1971), American criminologist
- Michael Duwe (born 1949), German composer, producer and musician
