= Michael New =

Michael New (born November 10, 1975) is an American political scientist, a visiting associate professor at the Catholic University of America, and an associate scholar with the Charlotte Lozier Institute.

New’s research has centered on analyzing laws and policies related to abortion restrictions.Anti-abortion groups have cited New's research to argue for the effectiveness of various types of state level laws restricting abortion rights, including informed consent laws, parental involvement laws, and public funding restrictions. New's research has also been used to validate Presidential platforms for and against abortion restrictions. Anti-abortion groups have used his research to encourage Rudy Giuliani to support abortion restrictions, and to challenge claims by Howard Dean.

New's secondary research is on tax-limitation amendments, such as Colorado's Taxpayer Bill of Rights. New's studies on tax limitation amendments have been used by both supporters of California's Proposition 13 and supporters of the Taxpayer Bill of Rights fiscal limit in Colorado.

New is an adjunct scholar at the CATO Institute, and is a fellow at the Witherspoon Institute. He has also worked for the anti-abortion group Americans United for Life and is a research associate at Reproductive Research Audit. His research has also been published by The Heritage Foundation and the Family Research Council.

New is also a regular commentator at National Review Online. New received his undergraduate degree from Dartmouth and his doctorate in political science from Stanford.

== Awards ==
- 2008 Witherspoon Fellowship
