= Tomislav Kovandzic =

American criminologist and professor

- Born: Tomislav Victor Kovandzic
- Education: Florida State University (B.A., 1993; M.A., 1995; Ph.D., 1999)
- Scientific career
- Fields: Criminology
- Workplaces: University of Texas at Dallas, University of Alabama at Birmingham
- Thesis: Crime prevention through selective incapacitation: an empirical assessment of Florida's habitual offender law (1999)

Tomislav Victor Kovandzic is an American criminologist and professor at the University of Texas at Dallas.

== Career ==
Before joining the faculty of the University of Texas at Dallas in 2007, he was an assistant professor at the University of Alabama at Birmingham from 1998 to 2005, and an associate professor there from 2005 to 2007. His research focuses on gun control and research methods in criminology. He has also studied the effects of three-strikes laws, right-to-carry gun laws, and increased police presence on crime rates.
