= Earl Grinols =

American economist

Earl Grinols (born 1951) is an American economist, political scientist, and author, currently serves as Distinguished Professor of Economics at Baylor University.

== Biography ==
Grinols was born in Bemidji, Minnesota, and attended the University of Michigan for undergraduate study, and then the University of Minnesota, receiving degrees from the latter in economics and mathematics. He earned his Ph.D. from Massachusetts Institute of Technology in 1977.

Grinols has taught or held positions at Cornell University, the University of Chicago, the University of Washington, MIT, the University of Illinois, and the Department of the Treasury in addition to Baylor University. He was Senior Economist for the President's Council of Economic Advisors in the presidency of Ronald Reagan.

In 1994 testimony to Congress, Grinols was one of the first academicians to recommend the formation of a national commission on gambling. The National Gambling Impact Study Commission was formed two years later in 1996, and issued its report, among other recommendations calling for a moratorium on the expansion of gambling in the United States in 1999.

In 2004 Grinols' third book, Gambling in America: Costs and Benefits was published by Cambridge University Press. His work "Casinos, Crime, and Community Costs" studied all 3,165 counties in the United States for a twenty-year period to establish statistical links between casinos and FBI Index I crime.
