= John Lott =

American economist and commentator (born 1958)

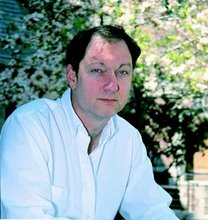
- Born: John Richard Lott Jr. May 8, 1958 (age 68)

Academic background
- Education: University of California, Los Angeles (BA, MA, PhD)

Academic work
- Discipline: Economics
- Institutions: University of Chicago; Yale University; The Wharton School; University of Maryland, College Park; American Enterprise Institute

John Richard Lott Jr. (born May 8, 1958) is an American economist, political commentator, and gun rights advocate. Lott was formerly employed at various academic institutions and at the American Enterprise Institute conservative think tank. He is the former president of the Crime Prevention Research Center, a nonprofit he founded in 2013. He worked in the Office of Justice Programs within the U.S. Department of Justice under the Donald Trump administration from October 2020 to January 2021. Lott holds a Ph.D. in economics from UCLA.

He has written for both academic and popular publications. He has authored books such as More Guns, Less Crime, The Bias Against Guns, and Freedomnomics. He is best known as a gun rights advocate and has argued against restrictions on owning and carrying guns. The New Yorker and The Trace have said "no one has had greater influence" in the scientific debate over firearms while Newsweek referred to Lott as "The Gun Crowd's Guru."

== Academic career ==
John Lott studied economics at UCLA, receiving his B.A. in 1980, M.A. in 1982, and Ph.D. in 1984. Lott has held positions in law and economics at several institutions, including the Yale Law School, the Hoover Institution, UCLA, the Wharton Business School, Texas A&M University, and Rice University. Lott was the chief economist at the United States Sentencing Commission (1988–1989). He spent five years at the University of Chicago, as a visiting professor from 1994 to 1995 and as a John M. Olin fellow from 1995 to 1999. Lott was a resident scholar at the American Enterprise Institute from 2001 to 2006. He left AEI for SUNY Binghamton. From July 2007 to 2010, Lott was a senior research scientist at the University of Maryland Foundation at the University of Maryland, College Park and lectured on law and economics.

Lott has written op-eds for The Wall Street Journal, The New York Times, the Los Angeles Times, USA Today, and the Chicago Tribune. Since 2008, he has been a columnist for Fox News, initially weekly.

== Research on guns ==
=== Concealed weapons and crime rate ===
In a 1997 article written with David B. Mustard and Lott's subsequent books More Guns, Less Crime and The Bias Against Guns, Lott argued that allowing adults to carry concealed weapons significantly reduces crime in America. In 2004, the National Academy of Sciences (NAS) National Research Council (NRC) conducted a review of current research and data on firearms and violent crime, including Lott's work, and concluded "that with the current evidence it is not possible to determine that there is a causal link between the passage of right-to-carry laws and crime rates." The NAS report wrote of Lott's work, "The initial model specification, when extended to new data, does not show evidence that passage of right-to-carry laws reduces crime. The estimated effects are highly sensitive to seemingly minor changes in the model specification and control variables." The criminologist James Q. Wilson was the only member on the 18-member NAS panel who dissented from this conclusion. For similar reasons as highlighted by the NAS, as well as "multiple serious problems with data and methodology", a 2020 comprehensive review of existing research on concealed-carry by the RAND Corporation discounted Lott's studies.

Other reviews said that there were problems with Lott's model. A replication by Dan A. Black and Daniel Nagin found that minor adjustments to Lott and Mustard's model led to the disappearance of the findings. In the New England Journal of Medicine, David Hemenway argued that Lott failed to account for several key variables, including drug consumption. Ian Ayres and John J. Donohue said that the model used by Lott contained significant coding errors and systemic bias. In the American Journal of Public Health, Daniel Webster et al. also raised concerns about flaws in the study, such as misclassification of laws and endogeneity of predictor variables, which they said rendered the study's conclusions "insupportable". Florida State University criminologist Gary Kleck considered it unlikely that such a large decrease in violent crime could be explained by a relatively modest increase in concealed carry. A 1998 study by Jens Ludwig that said it "more effectively control[ed] for unobserved variables that may vary over time" than the Lott and Mustard study concluded that "shall-issue laws have resulted, if anything, in an increase in adult homicide rates." A 2001 study in the Journal of Political Economy by University of Chicago economist Mark Duggan did robustness checks of Lott and Mustard's study and found that the findings of the Lott and Mustard study were inaccurate.

Other academics praised Lott's methodology, including Florida State University economist Bruce Benson, Cardozo School of Law professor John O. McGinnis, College of William and Mary professor Carlisle Moody, University of Mississippi professor William F. Shughart, and SUNY economist Florenz Plassmann and University of Adelaide economist John Whitley.

Referring to the research done on the topic, The Chronicle of Higher Education wrote in 2003 that "Mr. Lott's research has convinced his peers of at least one point: No scholars now claim that legalizing concealed weapons causes a major increase in crime." As Lott critics Ian Ayres and John J. Donohue III pointed out, "Lott and Mustard have made an important scholarly contribution in establishing that these laws have not led to the massive bloodbath of death and injury that some of their opponents feared. On the other hand, we find that the statistical evidence that these laws have reduced crime is limited, sporadic, and extraordinarily fragile." A 2008 article in Econ Journal Watch surveyed peer-reviewed empirical academic studies, and found that 10 supported the proposition that right-to-carry reduces crime, 8 supported no significant effect and none supported an increase. The article was rebutted by Ian Ayres and John J. Donohue in the same journal in 2009.

In 2013, Lott founded the nonprofit organization Crime Prevention Research Center to study the relationship between gun laws and crime. As of July 2015, he was also the organization's president. The board of directors for the organization includes guitarist Ted Nugent, conservative talkshow host Lars Larson and former sheriff David Clarke. In 2020, Lott left the organization to take a position in the Trump administration.

=== Defensive gun use ===
Lott argues in both More Guns, Less Crime and The Bias Against Guns that defensive gun use (DGU) is underreported, noting that in general, only shootings ending in fatalities are discussed in news stories. In More Guns, Less Crime, Lott writes that "[s]ince in many defensive cases a handgun is simply brandished, and no one is harmed, many defensive uses are never even reported to the police." In May 1998, Lott wrote that "national surveys" suggested that "98 percent of the time that people use guns defensively, they merely have to brandish a weapon to break off an attack." Lott cited similar figures in op-eds in The Wall Street Journal and the Los Angeles Times.

In 2002, he said that brandishing a weapon was sufficient to stop an attack 95% of the time. Other researchers criticized his methodology. A study in Public Opinion Quarterly said that his sample size of 1,015 respondents was too small for the study to be accurate and that the majority of similar studies suggest a value between 70 and 80 percent. According to Lott, Gary Kleck and Marc Gertz's 1994 estimate rises to 92 percent when brandishing and warning shots are added together. Lott said that the lower rates found by others was at least in part due to the different questions that were asked.

=== Defamation suit ===
On April 10, 2006, John Lott filed suit for defamation against Steven Levitt and HarperCollins Publishers over the book Freakonomics and against Levitt over a series of emails to John McCall. In the book Freakonomics, Levitt and coauthor Stephen J. Dubner claimed that the results of Lott's research in More Guns, Less Crime had not been replicated by other academics. In the emails to economist John McCall, who had pointed to a number of papers in different academic publications that had replicated Lott's work, Levitt wrote that the work by several authors supporting Lott in a special 2001 issue of the Journal of Law and Economics had not been peer-reviewed, Lott had paid the University of Chicago Press to publish the papers, and that papers with results opposite of Lott's had been blocked from publication in that issue. A federal judge found that Levitt's replication claim in Freakonomics was not defamation but found merit in Lott's complaint over the email claims. The dismissal was affirmed by a three-judge panel of The United States Court of Appeals for the Seventh Circuit on February 11, 2009.

A settlement was reached over the claims made by Levitt in the emails to McCall whereby Levitt did not have to issue a formal apology but rather send a letter of clarification to John McCall that the issue of the Journal of Law and Economics was peer-reviewed, and that Lott had not improperly influenced the editors. The Chronicle of Higher Education characterized Levitt's letter as offering "a doozy of a concession."

=== Disputed survey ===
In the course of a dispute with Otis Dudley Duncan in 1999–2000, Lott claimed to have undertaken a national survey of 2,424 respondents in 1997, the results of which were the source for claims he had made beginning in 1997. However, in 2000 Lott was unable to produce the data or any records showing that the survey had been undertaken. He said the 1997 hard drive crash that had affected several projects with co-authors had destroyed his survey data set, the original tally sheets had been abandoned with other personal property in his move from Chicago to Yale, and he could not recall the names of any of the students who he said had worked on it. Critics questioned whether the survey had ever taken place, but Lott defends the survey's existence and accuracy.

=== Mary Rosh persona ===
In response to the dispute surrounding the missing survey, Lott used a sock puppet by the name of "Mary Rosh" to defend his own works on Usenet and elsewhere. After investigative work by libertarian blogger Julian Sanchez, Lott admitted to using the Mary Rosh persona.

Further accusations claimed that Lott praised himself while posing as one of his former students and that "Rosh" was used to post a favorable review of More Guns, Less Crime on Amazon.com. Lott has claimed that the review was written by his son and wife. "I probably shouldn't have done it—I know I shouldn't have done it—but it's hard to think of any big advantage I got except to be able to comment fictitiously," Lott told The Washington Post in 2003.

=== Safe storage gun laws ===
In a 2001 study, Lott and John E. Whitley reported that safe-storage gun laws not only did not reduce juvenile suicides or accidental gun deaths, but that they also increased rates of violent and property crime. The study was criticized by Webster et al. in the Journal of the American Medical Association for using Tobit regression despite the fact that the data used in the study on youth suicides was "highly skewed and heteroskedastic", and because the vast majority of crimes that Lott and Whitley claimed increased due to safe-storage laws occurred outside the home. Webster and Carroll also wrote in Guns in American Society: An Encyclopedia of History, Politics, Culture, and the Law that the Lott and Whitley study's findings with respect to crime were inconsistent with prior research.

== Other research and events ==
In a study published in 2000, Lott concluded that most of the large recent increases in campaign spending for state and federal offices can be explained by higher government spending. Lott also supports the conclusion that higher quality judges, measured by their output once they are on the court (e.g., number of citations to their opinions or number of published opinions), take longer to get confirmed.

=== Lost Bush votes in the 2000 presidential election ===
In 2000, Lott argued, using a regression analysis, that George W. Bush lost at least 10,000 votes in Florida after the media incorrectly called the state for Al Gore while voting was still ongoing in the more conservative parts of the state. Lott's argument is used in the influential social science methodology textbook Rethinking Social Inquiry (edited by Henry Brady and David Collier) as an example of poor methodology. Contrary to Lott's study, they show that the number of lost Bush votes ranged from 28 to 56.

=== Abortion and crime ===
With John Whitley at the University of Adelaide, Lott published a study that argued that liberalization of abortion laws led to higher murder rates. In a review of the literature on the relationship between abortion and crime, Theodore Joyce, an economist at Baruch College and the National Bureau of Economic Research, praised Lott and Whitley for gathering additional data on abortion but criticized the methodology that they used.

=== Illegal immigration and crime ===
Lott has non-peer-reviewed research that purports to show that undocumented immigrants are more crime-prone than U.S. citizens. In doing so, Lott lumped together both legal and illegal immigrants in prison into a category for illegal immigrants, leading to an elevated crime rate for illegal immigrants. The Washington Post fact-checker wrote that this was a "significant flaw in Lott's study that undercuts his conclusion. Lott says the overall thrust of his study still holds, but the issue muddles his research and invites guesswork as to the actual crime rate for the undocumented immigrant population in Arizona."

Lott's claims were heavily promoted by the Trump administration to justify its anti-immigration policies, in particular their attempts to end DACA.

=== Women's suffrage and government growth ===
According to a study by Lott and Larry Kenny, "women's suffrage coincided with immediate increases in state government expenditures and revenue and more liberal voting patterns for federal representatives, and these effects continued growing over time as more women took advantage of the franchise."

=== Affirmative action in police departments ===
Lott published a study arguing that affirmative action in the hiring of police reduced the overall quality of all officers and increased crime. The most adverse effects of these hiring policies have occurred in the most heavily black-populated cities. There is no consistent evidence that crime rates rise when standards for hiring women are changed.

=== Environmental regulations ===
Together with John Karpoff and Eric Wehrly at the University of Washington, Lott has worked to show the importance of government regulations through both legal and regulatory penalties and the weaknesses of reputational penalties in reducing pollution. Firms violating environmental laws suffer statistically significant losses in the market value of firm equity. The losses are of similar magnitudes to the legal penalties imposed; and in the cross section, the market value loss is related to the size of the legal penalty.

=== Voter fraud claims ===
In October 2020, Lott was appointed as a senior adviser for research and statistics at the Office of Justice Programs within the U.S. Department of Justice in the Donald Trump administration. Lott resigned from the DoJ on January 16, 2021. Lott has claimed there was voter fraud in the 2020 United States presidential election. He argued there was "irregularities" in the absentee ballots in Missoula County, and later wrote a paper claiming there was evidence of fraud in the absentee ballots in Georgia and Pennsylvania. A 2021 PNAS study by political scientists at Stanford University and the University of Chicago rebutted Lott's paper as being not even remotely convincing, writing that his analysis was "entirely dependent on the completely arbitrary order in which pairs of precincts in other counties are entered in the dataset" and that his conclusions about voter fraud were "utterly baseless."

=== 2021 "graduation address" event ===
On June 4, 2021, two parents of a child killed in the 2018 shooting at Marjory Stoneman Douglas High School invited Lott and David Keene to deliver what they falsely said was a dress rehearsal for a 2021 graduation address for a fictitious school called "the James Madison Academy". The space for the audience contained 3,044 empty folding chairs. Lott first realized that the event was a staged attempt to call attention to school shootings, and not a genuine commencement address dress rehearsal, when news media asked him to comment on segments of video of the "dress rehearsal" that the organizers posted on the internet. They said that the empty chairs were intended to represent the victims of school shootings who would never graduate from high school. In a local Las Vegas news interview, Lott said that he is not opposed to all forms of background checks but simply believes that background checks broadly discriminate against persons of color, primarily black and Hispanic, among potential gun buyers.

== Bibliography ==
- Uncertainty and Economic Evolution (ISBN 0-415-15166-X)
- Are Predatory Commitments Credible? (ISBN 0-226-49355-5)
- More Guns, Less Crime (ISBN 0-226-49364-4)
- The Bias Against Guns (ISBN 0-89526-114-6)
- Straight Shooting (ISBN 0-936783-47-8)
- Freedomnomics (ISBN 978-1-596-98506-3)
- Debacle: Obama's War on Jobs and Growth and What We Can Do Now to Regain Our Future (ISBN 978-1118186176)
- At the Brink: Will Obama Push Us Over the Edge? (ISBN 978-1621570516)
- Dumbing Down the Courts: How Politics Keeps the Smartest Judges Off the Bench (ISBN 978-1626522497)
- The War on Guns, Regnery Publishing 2016 (ISBN 978-1-62157-580-1)

== See also ==
- Gun violence in the United States
- Stephen Halbrook
- Gary Kleck
- List of American Enterprise Institute scholars and fellows
- Rudolph Rummel
