= 2017 Chomutov incident =

Shooting incident

2017 Chomutov shooter trial
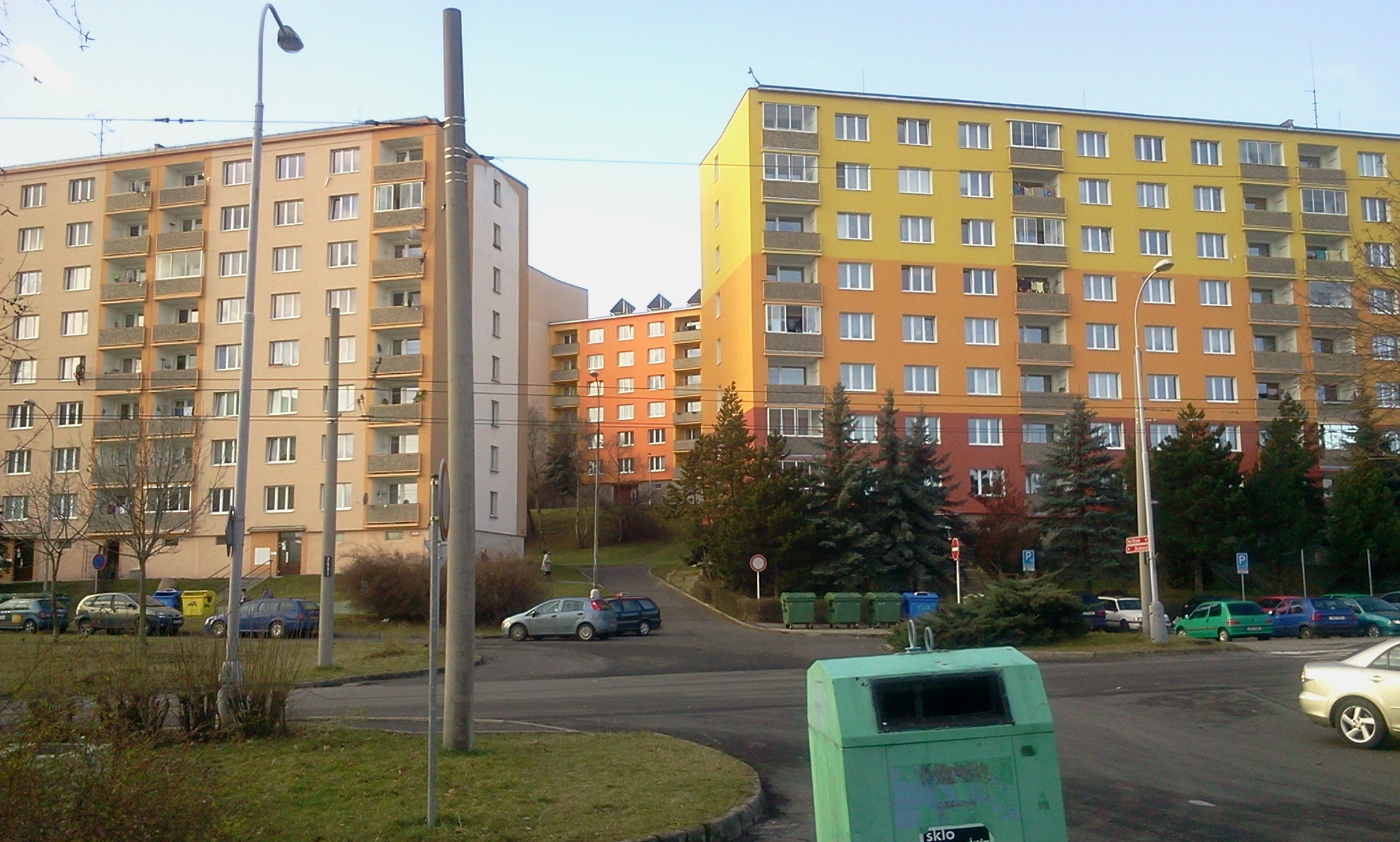
- A housing estate near the place of incident
- Court: High Court in Prague
- Full case name: 7 To 62/2018
- Decided: 28 August 2018
- Transcript: Vrchní soud v Praze

Case history
- Appealed from: Regional Court in Ústí nad Labem judge Jiří Bednář

Outcome
- Bad Defensive gun use Murder conviction 10 years imprisonment

Court membership
- Judges sitting: Martin Zelenka (presiding), Michaela Pařízková, Michal Hodouška

On 27 May 2017, a 37-year-old man believed that a vehicular rampage was taking place in front of his home and in an effort to stop it, he shot the 34 year old driver dead. The subsequent investigation and court case attracted significant public attention mainly due to issues related to the limits of legitimate self-defense and defensive gun use in the Czech Republic.

== Background ==
In months and years preceding the incident, Europe has seen a number of vehicular terror attacks against pedestrians. While no similar terror attack had taken place directly in the Czech Republic, the 1973 vehicular rampage perpetrated by Olga Hepnarová is the second largest mass murder in the country (with 20 victims, of them 8 fatal), before the 2023 Prague shooting (43 victims, 18 fatal).

The Czech Republic issues concealed carry permits, in which private firearm possession is seen as one way to provide public safety, especially when it comes to soft target protection at the time of increased terror risk. There are 240,000 civilians licensed to carry concealed firearms. However, it is unknown how many of them actually regularly do so. Following a wave of terror attacks around Europe, a number of politicians as well as security professionals started urging gun owners to actually carry firearms in order to be able to contribute to soft targets protection. These included, among many others, President Miloš Zeman as well as Libor Lochman, Chief of URNA, the country's main special forces anti-terrorism unit.

Czech courts had previously ruled that a car constitutes a weapon in case it is intentionally used against a person, even when driven slowly and with no injuries caused. Under Czech law, a firearm may be used for self-defense in case that its use is not "manifestly disproportionate to the manner of attack".

== Night of the incident ==
The initial police report describes the incident that took place at 3 AM on 27 May 2017 as follows: "A man (b. 1980) heard a loud noise from the street in the night, and from his window situated in a block of apartments he saw a van that was crashing into parked cars and driving into people assembled on the pathwalk in front of the house. He immediately took his legally owned firearm and went outside, where he opened fire towards the van that was passing by his side. The driver (born 1983) was hit by several bullets and suffered serious injuries that proved fatal. The suspect awaited arrival of police and admitted to the shooting." Media reported that one woman had her leg run over by the driver, while several parked cars were damaged.

The shooter was charged with murder and remanded in jail pending police interviews with witnesses (whereby maximum length of remand is 3 months). The state attorney petitioned court to remand the shooter also for fear of avoiding trial, which would allow jailing him for more than 3 months, however court refused that and state attorney did not challenge that decision. He was released from custody on 14 August 2017 to await trial.

== People involved ==
=== Shooter ===
The shooter was identified by media as a 37 year old Petr Benda, an ethnically white Czech former prison guard that works as a warehouseman. He had owned the firearm legally since 2002.

The shooter claimed that he acted in defense of self and others. He is represented by Jiří Pašek, a local attorney.

=== Driver ===
The driver was identified by media as a 34 year old "Radek Š.", a Czech citizen of Romani ethnicity that lived in the Netherlands and who was visiting his relatives in Chomutov. At the time of his death, the driver was under influence of both alcohol and drugs.

Media brought reports of uneasy relations between ethnic Czechs and Romanis at the apartment complex where the incident took place as well as information about possible racist motive of the shooting, which the police however denied.

== Legal proceedings ==
=== Indictment ===
State Attorney Vladimír Jan indicted the shooter on 6 February 2018 on charges of premeditated murder and damage to property; if found guilty, the shooter may face 12 to 20 years imprisonment. According to Jan, the shooter did not act in legitimate defense as the shooting happened after the danger elapsed (there were no more people in the driving path of the car).

According to the indictment, the driver was returning home from a nightclub and an uncle, who was under influence of drugs, stopped him in front of the shooter's house. They engaged in a quarrel. Afterward, the driver attempted to drive away, a group of his relatives was trying to stop him. In an attempt to drive away from the crowd, the driver hit several cars and was driving on the footpath in front of the shooter's house. By that moment the police had already received several calls from concerned citizens and dispatched a unit there.

The shooter was alerted by his mother, who told him that a driver was hitting cars and people in front of their house and after a brief look out of the window, he ran outside with gun in hand. The van was driving 7 to 8 km/h on the footpath with no obstacle or people further in its way. At that moment, the shooter engaged the driver with at least 13 shots from his 9mm Beretta Px4 Storm, hitting him 8 times. The driver was shot in the front torso, leg, side as well as back and died shortly afterward.

State attorney further clarified that media reports of shooter's racial slurs were not corroborated by any witness statements, and that the case has no racial underline.

The victim's family sought damages in amount of CZK 5 million (US$250,000).

=== Testimonies ===
In his opening statement, the shooter claimed that he intended to protect the people outside: "My mother told me that there is some lunatic outside. I looked out of the window and I saw a car driving back and forth. At one moment the car very closely missed a group of people. I heard a lot of screaming. I will remember that screaming forever. I recalled all those repulsive car attacks from other countries and decided to go out and help those people." He claimed he started shooting when the van drove in his direction. The shooter apologized to the driver's family, saying that he wishes the incident had a different outcome, however that he does not feel guilty of committing a murder.

A witness testified that he "saw someone driving in a van on a parking lot. It was clear from the driving style that the driver was off. Some woman started screaming that he ran over her legs. He was driving into cars as well as into people." According to another witness, someone was shouting "he drove him off, he probably killed him. I was thinking what a madman, he is driving people over and hitting cars." The shooter's mother said that from her window, it seemed that the car is trying to drive into a crowd of people: "When I saw my son with pistol in hand I told him not to do anything. Then I called the police, I didn't even realize he left, and then I only heard the shots."

According to the driver's father's testimony, the driver was walking his dog when he was engaged by his uncle. They brawled, and afterwards he got into the car and tried to drive away: "He was driving very slowly, maybe he intended to stop, he wasn't endangering anyone, and at that moment Benda came out of the house and shot entire magazine." According to driver's mother written testimony, the same person who was shooting previously shouted from windows from high above racial slurs. The shooter denied that, commenting that he did not say a single word during the entire incident.

According to a psychologist, the shooter has a high moral standard. He feels sorry for the driver's death, however at the same time he is convinced that the given situation required what he did.

A municipal policeman that first arrived to the scene testified that Benda told him that he had shot at the van in self-defense and surrendered the firearm. As more and more Romanis were coming to the scene shouting death threats in the shooter's direction, he took him away. Immediately after the incident, the shooter told the policeman that the car had been driving towards him when he opened fire. The shooter was sober and fully cooperated. Another witness, driver's uncle, testified that the driver got into the car after a quarrel, and drove the car against his (uncle's) girlfriend. The car hit her and knocked her down. Then the driver crashed into several parked cars, which was followed by the gunshots.

Driver's brother, who was wearing a belly chain and who was escorted by four prison guards as he was serving prison sentence for unrelated crime at the time of the hearing, testified that the driver was a successful freelance businessman in the Netherlands and that he came to Chomutov with the aim of purchasing a flat for their mother.

In his closing statement, the shooter said that "going out was my first mistake, I was a naive fool that wanted to help people. The second mistake was the shooting itself. Had I not been so frightened, had I handled the situation in a psychologically and physically better way, it could have had different ending. I am sorry, I did not mean to kill him, but I don't feel guilty of anything."

On 17 April 2018, the court found the shooter guilty of premeditated murder and sentenced the shooter to 12.5 years imprisonment. After release, the shooter shall be prohibited from possessing a firearm for further 10 years. The court also awarded CZK 2.5 million (US$125,000) to the driver's relatives. The judge said that "in the moment when the defendant came outside, he did nothing to assess whether there is any imminent threat, he immediately started shooting and emptied his entire magazine into the car. At the moment of the shooting, the car was not endangering the defendant, nor anybody else. Thus, the shooter used his firearm without any cause, unjustifiably, and he must have done so with intent to kill. When shooting entire magazine at the driver's doors and seeing the driver inside, the defendant must have been aware the 9mm rounds will easily penetrate the doors and cause a potentially deadly injury."

=== Appeal ===
The shooter lodged appeal against the verdict. The appeal was heard by the High Court in Prague which changed the conviction to murder without premeditation and sentenced the shooter to 7 years imprisonment.

The High Court overruled the original decision in several key areas:

- The High Court held that the shooter's actions undertaken within the flat (a decision to load the firearm and go outside to stop the van) were legitimate and covered under the legal definition of necessary defense as he genuinely believed that people's lives were at risk. Thus the court diverged from the original opinion which considered this to be the moment when the murder was premeditated. However, once the shooter got outside of the building, he should have recognized that the car was already leaving the scene and that it was very slowly driving in a direction where there were no more people in its path. Thus, nobody was threatened by the driver by the time of commencement of shooting.
- The High Court further held that the shooter was not under extraordinary distress and thus his actions cannot be considered a mere manslaughter.
- The High court further held that the shooter was cooperating with the investigation from the beginning, had been a law-abiding citizen for his entire life and had positive psychological and psychiatrical assessment as regards the possibility of resocialization. Taking into account that the entire situation was started and exacerbated by the victim and that the shooter acted with aim of protecting others, albeit outside of legal limits of necessary defense, the court decided that there are sufficient reasons for punishment outside the minimum band of standard penalty for murder (10–18 years) and punished the shooter with 7 years of imprisonment.

Both the shooter and the Supreme State Attorney lodged an appeal against the decision. The appeal was decided by the Supreme Court in Brno. On appeal, Supreme Court ruled that conditions for reducing the sentence below the minimum penalty for murder were not met, and returned the case to High Court in Prague for re-sentencing. The High Court sentenced the shooter to 10 years of imprisonment.

== See also ==
- Gun laws in the Czech Republic
- Vehicle-ramming attack
