= Patricia Grambsch =

American biostatistician

Patricia Louise Meller Grambsch is an American biostatistician known for her work on survival models including proportional hazards models. With Terry M. Therneau, she developed the Grambsch–Therneau test, a statistical method used to check the assumptions of the Cox model. She is an associate professor emerita of biostatistics at the University of Minnesota.

== Education and career ==
Grambsch completed her Ph.D. in 1980 at the University of Minnesota, with the dissertation Conditional Likelihood Inference supervised by David Hinkley. Before returning to Minnesota as a faculty member, she worked in the survival analysis group at the Mayo Clinic for five years, from 1985 to 1990.

== Research ==
Grambsch's research has focused on survival analysis and diagnostic methods for statistical models. Her most notable work is on proportional hazards models used in modern survival analysis.

=== Grambsch–Therneau test ===
In 1994, Grambsch and her colleague Terry M. Therneau published the paper "Proportional hazards tests and diagnostics based on weighted residuals" in Biometrika. The paper introduced a formal statistical test, known as the Grambsch–Therneau test, to assess the validity of the proportional hazards assumption in the Cox proportional hazards model. The test is based on the correlation between scaled Schoenfeld residuals and a function of time. A non-zero correlation suggests that the assumption is violated. This method is a standard diagnostic tool implemented in many statistical software packages, including R, SAS, and Stata.

== Recognition ==
Grambsch was elected as a Fellow of the American Statistical Association in 1996.

== Selected works ==
- Therneau, Terry M.; Grambsch, Patricia M. (2000). Modeling Survival Data: Extending the Cox Model. Springer. ISBN 978-0-387-98784-2.
- Grambsch, P. M.; Therneau, T. M. (1994). "Proportional hazards tests and diagnostics based on weighted residuals". Biometrika. 81 (3): 515–526. doi:10.1093/biomet/81.3.515.
