= Grant Duwe =

American criminologist

Grant Duwe is an American criminologist and research director at the Minnesota Department of Corrections, as well as a non-visiting scholar at Baylor University's Institute for Studies of Religion. Duwe holds a bachelor's degree from the University of Kansas and a Ph.D. in Criminology and Criminal Justice from Florida State University.

== Mass murder research ==
Duwe's research on mass murder has examined its patterns and prevalence, the role of the news media in its social construction as a crime problem, and the impact of right-to-carry concealed firearms laws on mass public shootings. In 2007, he wrote the book, Mass Murder in the United States: A History, an "excellent historical analysis of mass murder in the United States" that is still considered "one of the most exhaustive studies" that has been done on the topic.

Since the publication of Mass Murder in the United States: A History, Duwe has written articles that have focused on mass public shootings. In these articles, Duwe argues that while mass public shootings have not recently been on the rise, they have become more deadly. He has been critical of the methods Mother Jones has used to compile its mass shooting dataset and the conclusions that have been drawn from the use of these data.

== Corrections research ==
Duwe has published more than 50 research studies and program evaluations in peer-reviewed academic journals on a wide variety of correctional topics. He is the author of a 2017 report published by the National Institute of Justice on the use and impact of correctional interventions on prison misconduct, post-prison employment, recidivism, and cost avoidance. He is also a co-author (along with Michael Hallett, Joshua Hays, Byron Johnson, and Sung Joon Jang) of the book, The Angola Prison Seminary: Effects of Faith-Based Ministry on Identity Transformation, Desistance, and Rehabilitation.

Duwe has developed risk assessment instruments that predict sexual recidivism and first-time sexual offending. He is also the developer of the Minnesota Screening Tool Assessing Recidivism Risk (MnSTARR), a fully automated instrument that assesses risk for multiple types of recidivism for males and female prisoners. He received the American Society of Criminology's inaugural Practitioner Research Award for his development of the MnSTARR.
