= David Hemenway =

American economist (born 1945)

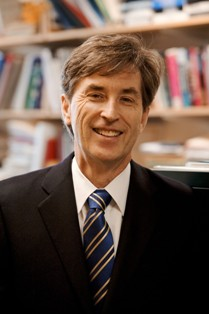
- Born: 1945 (age 80–81)
- Education: Harvard University
- Known for: Studying violence and injury prevention
- Awards: Robert Wood Johnson Investigator Award in Health Policy Research, Excellence in Science Award from the injury section of the American Public Health Association, Striving for Justice Award from Community Works, Distinguished Honoree Award from the Law Center to Prevent Gun Violence, 20 for 20 Leadership Award from the Centers for Disease Control and Prevention, Pioneer Award from Injury Free Coalition for Kids, Alan Balsam Public Health Leadership Award from Friends of Brookline Public Health
- Scientific career
- Fields: Economics, public health
- Workplaces: Harvard School of Public Health
- Thesis: Industrywide voluntary products standards (1974)

David Hemenway (born 1945) is a professor of Health Policy at the Harvard School of Public Health and Director of the Harvard Injury Control Research Center. He has a B.A. (1966) and Ph.D. (1974) from Harvard University, as well as an MA (1967) from University of Michigan, all in economics. He was James Marsh Visiting Professor-at-Large at the University of Vermont from 2005 to 2012 and 2020-2021 Elizabeth S. and Richard M. Cashin Fellow at the Harvard Radcliffe Institute. In 2012, he received the Centers for Disease Control's 20 for 20 Leadership Award in recognition of his status as one of the "twenty most influential injury and violence processionals over the past twenty years". Hemenway has written over 270 articles and seven books in the fields of economics and public health.

== Research ==
Hemenway began his research in the field of injury prevention in the 1960s, when he helped investigate product safety for Ralph Nader as one of "Nader's Raiders". Since then, he has become well known for studying gun violence and how it can be prevented.

== Books ==
His most recent book is While We Were Sleeping: Success Stories in Injury and Violence Prevention (2009). Private Guns, Public Health (2006) describes the public health approach to reducing firearm violence, and summarizes scientific research on firearms and health.

Prices and Choices (1993) is a collection of twenty-six of his essays applying microeconomic theory to everyday life. Monitoring and Compliance: the Political Economy of Inspection (1985) describes the importance of inspection processes in ensuring that regulations are followed, and the reasons the system often fails. Industry-wide Voluntary Product Standards (1975) describes the role of voluntary standards and standardization in the U.S. economy.

An early statistics article, Why Your Classes are Larger than Average, has been anthologized in various mathematical collections.
