= Race in the United States criminal justice system =

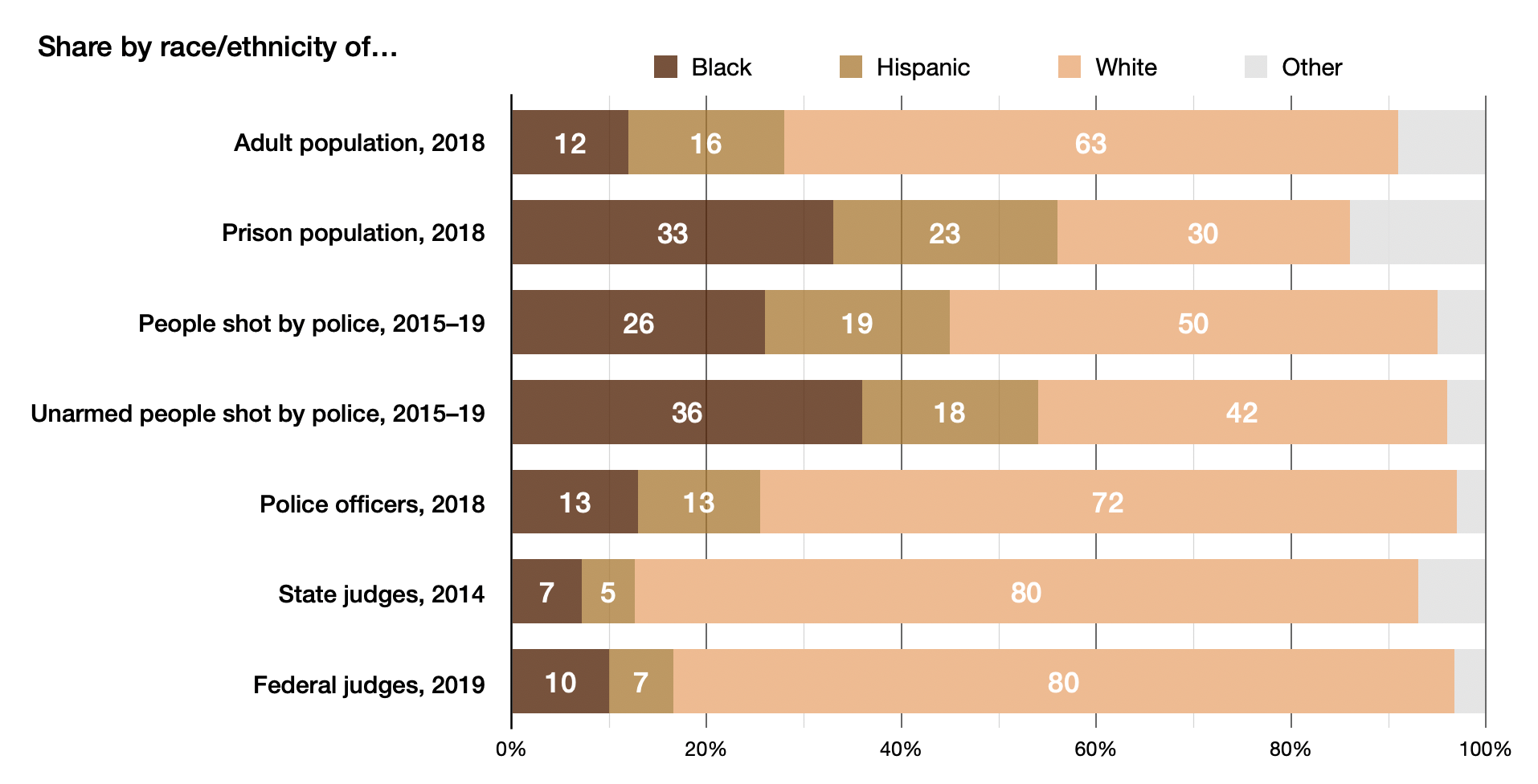
Racial disparities in the share of prisoners, police officers, people shot by police, and judges in the United States in the late 2010s

Race in the United States criminal justice system refers to the unique experiences and disparities in the United States in regard to the policing and prosecuting of various races. There have been different outcomes for different racial groups in convicting and sentencing offenders in the United States criminal justice system, although prior arrests and criminal history is also a factor. Experts and analysts have debated the relative importance of different factors that have led to these disparities.

Academic research indicates that the over-representation of some racial minorities in the criminal justice system can in part be explained by socioeconomic factors, such as poverty, exposure to poor neighborhoods, poor access to public education, poor access to early childhood education, and exposure to harmful chemicals (such as lead) and pollution. Racial housing segregation has also been linked to racial disparities in crime rates, as blacks have historically and to the present been prevented from moving into prosperous low-crime areas through actions of the government (such as redlining) and private actors. Various explanations within criminology have been proposed for racial disparities in crime rates, including conflict theory, strain theory, general strain theory, social disorganization theory, macrostructural opportunity theory, social control theory, and subcultural theory.

Research also indicates that there is extensive racial and ethnic discrimination by police and the judicial system. A substantial academic literature has compared police searches (showing that contraband is found at higher rates in whites who are stopped), bail decisions (showing that whites with the same bail decision as blacks commit more pre-trial violations), and sentencing (showing that blacks are more harshly sentenced by juries and judges than whites when the underlying facts and circumstances of the cases are similar), providing valid causal inferences of racial discrimination. Studies have documented patterns of racial discrimination, as well as patterns of police brutality and disregard for the constitutional rights of African-Americans, by police departments in various American cities, including Los Angeles, New York, and Philadelphia.

== History ==
Race has been a factor in the United States criminal justice system since the system's beginnings, as the nation was founded on Native American soil. It continues to be a factor throughout United States history through the present, with organizations such as Black Lives Matter calling for decarceration through divestment from police and prisons and reinvestment in public education and universal health care.

=== Legal background (1763–1829) ===
Lynching and Lynch-Law date back to the 1700s when the term was first used by the Scotch-Irish in reference to an act pursued by the Quakers toward Native Americans. The law was originally regulatory, providing regulations regarding how lynching could and could not be carried out. Most crimes of and relating to lynching prior to 1830 were frontier crimes and were considered justifiable due to necessity.

Groups of armed White men, called slave patrols, monitored enslaved African Americans. First established in South Carolina in 1704, the slave patrols' function was to police slaves, especially runaways. Slave owners feared slaves might organize a revolt or rebellion, so state militias were formed to provide a military command structure and discipline within the slave patrols to detect, encounter, and crush any organized slave meetings that might lead to revolt or rebellion.

=== Antebellum (1830–1860) ===
Lynch law was renewed with the anti-slavery movement, as several acts of violence towards people of color took place in the early 1830s. In August 1831, Nat Turner led the slave insurrection in Virginia. Turner, an African-American Baptist preacher, believing that the Lord had destined him to free his race, followed through with his plans to conquer Southampton county through the enlistment of other slaves. He did so by traveling from house to house murdering every White person he could find. Due to this act, many innocent slaves were killed by the police.

The court decision in Dred Scott v. Sandford made it so that African slaves and their descendants were considered non-citizens, further incorporating racism into the justice system.

=== Postbellum (1865–) ===
When slavery was abolished after the Civil War through the ratification of the Thirteenth Amendment to the constitution, violence against African Americans increased tremendously and thousands of African Americans experienced lynching. African American men were routinely rounded up, charged with being unemployed or having changed jobs without the consent of their previous employer (which were both illegal for Blacks in some southern states), and subjected to years of forced hard labor in a system of convict leasing and chain gangs. Between 1850 and 1940 ethnic minorities made up 40-50% of the incarcerated population.

During the same time period, unequal treaties towards Native Americans led to a large decrease in Native American land holdings, and Native Americans were forced into 160 acres (65 ha) reservations.

Latin Americans entering the country were also a target for the penal system during this time.

=== Reconstruction Period (1865–1877) ===
The Ku Klux Klan, was founded in 1865 in Pulaski, Tennessee as a vigilante organization whose goal was to keep control over freed slaves; It performed acts of lawlessness against negroes and other minorities. This included taking negro prisoners from the custody of officers or breaking into jails to put them to death. Few efforts were made by civil authorities in the South against the Ku Klux Klan.

The Memphis Riots of 1866 took place after many Black men were discharged from the United States Army. The riot broke out when a group of discharged Negro soldiers got into a brawl with a group of Irish police officers in Memphis, Tennessee. Forty-six African Americans and two White people were killed in the riot, and seventy-five people received bullet wounds. At least five African American women were raped by predatory gangs, and the property damage was worth over $100,000.

In 1868 the Fourteenth Amendment to the United States Constitution overruled the 1857 Dred Scott v. Sandford by establishing that those born or naturalized in the United States are entitled to equal protection under the law, regardless of race.

=== Norris v. Alabama (1935) ===
In 1935 the United States Supreme Court overturned convictions of the Scottsboro Boys in Norris v. Alabama. These were nine African American teenagers who had been previously denied equal protection under the law as stated in the Fourteenth Amendment to the United States Constitution because African Americans were purposely excluded from their cases' juries.

== By stage of the criminal justice process ==
Among key findings on the literature is that Whites with the same bail decision as Blacks commit more pre-trial violations and that Blacks are more harshly sentenced by juries and judges than Whites when the underlying facts and circumstances of the cases are similar.

=== Race and policing ===
Studies have documented patterns of racial discrimination, as well as patterns of police brutality and disregard for the constitutional rights of African-Americans, by police departments in various American cities, including Los Angeles, New York, Chicago and Philadelphia. It is also a paradoxical fact that security personnel across all US cities are disproportionately drawn from people of African descent and such security personnel have minimal background training in legal guidelines.

==== Police killings ====
A number of studies referencing both the CDC's National Violent Death Reporting System, as well as crowdsourced sources on police killings, have concluded that Black people are more likely to be killed by police than White people, with one 2019 study from the Proceedings of the National Academy of Sciences of the United States of America stating that police violence is a leading cause of death for young men of color. At least three quarters of those killed were armed. A database collected by The Guardian concluded that 1093 people in 2016 were killed by the police. In total numbers, White people make up the majority of police deaths in the database, but not the highest rate per million. The rate of fatal police shootings per million was 10.13 for Native Americans, 6.66 for Black people, 3.23 for Hispanics; 2.93 for White people and 1.17 for Asians. One study indicates that there is a correlation between measures of structural racism (e.g. residential segregation, differences in incarceration rates, differences in education level, employment rates) and racial discrepancy of police violence, at the state level. Exact estimates vary, but these sources indicate that Black people are at least twice as likely as White people to be killed by police, and are significantly more likely to be unarmed.

Although some studies indicate that Black people are more likely than White people to be victims of police shootings in particular, a 2015 study by Roland G. Fryer, Jr. concluded that nationwide, White people were more likely to be shot by police than Black people in similar situations, while Black and Hispanic people were more likely to experience excessive force, even when compliant and law-abiding. A 2019 paper by Princeton University political scientists disputed the findings by Fryer, saying that if police had a higher threshold for stopping Whites, this might mean that the Whites, Hispanics and Blacks in Fryer's data are not similar. A separate PNAS study found that there were no racial disparities in police shootings by White police; the findings of the study were disputed by Princeton University scholars who argued that the study's method and dataset made it impossible for the authors to reach that conclusion. Following the criticism by the Princeton scholars, the authors of the original PNAS study corrected their significance statement to read, "As the proportion of White officers in a fatal officer-involved shooting increased, a person fatally shot was not more likely to be of a racial minority." A study by Texas A&M University economists found that White police officers were more likely to use force and guns than Black police, and that White officers were five times as likely to use gun force in predominantly Black neighborhoods. A 2016 study published in the Injury Prevention journal indicated that the racial disparity in police killings may be due primarily to a disparity in how often Black, Native American, and Hispanic people are stopped, as they did not find much racial differences in deaths after being stopped.

A 2014 study involving computer-based simulations of a police encounter found a greater likelihood of undergraduate student participants shooting Black targets over White ones. The study found that a majority of police officers see "ambiguous behavior as more violent when the actor is Black rather than White," but found that in the simulation, police did not generally show a biased pattern of shooting. Another study at Washington State University used realistic police simulators of different scenarios where a police officer might use deadly force. The study concluded that unarmed White suspects were three times more likely to be shot than unarmed Black suspects. The study found that "the participants were experiencing a greater threat response when faced with African Americans instead of White or Hispanic suspects" but were still "significantly slower to shoot armed Black suspects than armed White suspects, and significantly less likely to mistakenly shoot unarmed Black suspects than unarmed White suspects." The study concluded that the results could be because officers were more concerned with using deadly force against Black suspects for fear of how it would be perceived. A 2016 study, which reviewed 812 fatalities from on-duty law-enforcement between 2009 and 2012 in 17 different states, concluded that unarmed Black people were 1.57 times more likely to be killed by police than White people.

==== General use of force ====
Police behavior depends on the social dynamics of a scenario in a police to citizen interaction. Within scenarios of a police to citizen interaction, different levels of force can be applied to the citizen. A 2017 study found that people of different races are treated differently by police officers throughout the time of their interaction. 62 White, 42 Black, and 35 Latino use-of-force cases were studied from a medium-to-large-sized urban police department in the United States. The outcomes of the study showed that Black and Latino suspects have more force applied to them early on in the police to citizen interaction, while White citizens receive more violent force as the interaction progresses.

Reports by the Department of Justice have also found that police officers in Baltimore, Maryland, and Ferguson, Missouri, systemically stop, search (in some cases strip-searching) and harass Black residents. A January 2017 report by the DOJ also found that the Chicago Police Department had "unconstitutionally engaged in a pattern of excessive and deadly force". An independent task created by the mayor of Chicago to examine the department concluded that they "have no regard for the sanctity of life when it comes to people of color." A 2020 American Political Science Review study estimated that 39% of uses of force by police against Blacks and Hispanics in New York City was racially discriminatory.

==== Searches and arrests ====
According to a 2003 study, the probability of arrest given the commission of a crime is higher for Whites than it is for Blacks for robbery, aggravated assault, and simple assault, whereas for rape the probability of arrest is approximately equal across offender race. Scholars have found that some racial and ethnic minorities, particularly African Americans, are disproportionately represented in the arrest and victimization reports which are used to compile crime rate statistics in the United States. The data from 2008 reveals that black Americans are over-represented in terms of arrests made in virtually all types of crime, with the exceptions of "driving under the influence", "liquor laws" and hate crime. Overall, black Americans are arrested at 2.6 times the per-capita rate of all other Americans, and this ratio is even higher for murder (6.3 times) and robbery (8.1 times). Research suggests that police practices, such as racial profiling, over-policing in areas populated by minorities and in-group bias may result in disproportionately high numbers of racial minorities among crime suspects.

A study in 2020 of 95 million traffic stops by 56 police agencies from 2011 to 2018 found Black people to be much more likely to get pulled over, but less so at night when they were less distinguishable, with the effect heightened during darker nights, and that Blacks were more likely to be searched during the stop despite Whites being more likely to have illicit substances. A smaller study focusing on just the city of Oakland found no evidence of racial bias, while a study in Cincinnati found evidence Blacks were less likely to be stopped during the day. Another study focusing on Minneapolis found evidence of Blacks being less likely to be stopped at night, while a study assessing data from Syracuse found no evidence of racial bias, though a follow-up study contested this. A study from Durham found evidence of racial disparity, though only when the driver was male. According to the Los Angeles Times, during traffic stops 24% of Black drivers were searched, while 16% of Latinos and 5% of Whites were. A 2019 study found that in Cincinnati, Blacks were 30% more likely to be stopped than Whites. In-group bias has been observed when it comes to traffic citations, as Black and White cops are more likely to cite out-groups. A 2013 report by the American Civil Liberties Union found that Blacks were "3.73 times more likely than Whites to be arrested for marijuana possession," even though "Blacks and Whites use drugs, including marijuana, at similar rates." Analysis of more than 20 million traffic stops in North Carolina showed that Blacks were more than twice as likely as Whites to be pulled over by police for traffic stops, and that Blacks were more likely to be searched following the stop. There were no significant difference in the likelihood that Hispanics would be pulled over, but Hispanics were much more likely to be searched following a traffic stop than Whites. When the study controlled for searches in high-crime areas, it still found that police disproportionately targeted Black individuals. These racial disparities were particularly pronounced for young men. The study found that Whites who were searched were more likely to carry contraband than Blacks and Hispanics.

A study in Travis County, Texas found that Blacks comprised 30% of arrests for under a gram of an illicit drug from 2017 to 2018, despite only making up 9% of the population, with survey data showing similar rates of use between Blacks and Whites. In 2019 The Intercept reported that Blacks in South Bend, Indiana were 4.3 times more likely to be arrested for cannabis possession than Whites.

A 2020 study in Charlottesville found that there were racial disparities in the "seriousness of charges brought, the number of companion charges, bail-bond release decisions, the length of stay awaiting trial, and guilty outcomes." A 2018 study in the Journal of Empirical Legal Studies found that law enforcement officers in Texas who could charge shoplifters with two types of crimes (one more serious, one less so) due to a vaguely worded statute were more likely to charge Blacks and Hispanics with the more serious crime.

A 2019 study, which made use of a dataset of the racial makeup of every U.S. sheriff over a 25-year period, found that "ratio of Black‐to‐White arrests is significantly higher under White sheriffs" and that the effects appear to be "driven by arrests for less‐serious offenses and by targeting Black crime types."

A 2019 study by the National Institute of Standards and Technology found that facial-recognition systems were substantially more likely to misidentify the faces of racial minorities. Some ethnic groups, such as Asian-Americans and African-American, were up to 100 times more likely to be misidentified than White men.

A 2018 study in the journal Proceedings of the National Academy of Sciences found that tall young Black men are especially likely to receive unjustified attention by law enforcement. The authors furthermore found a "causal link between perceptions of height and perceptions of threat for Black men, particularly for perceivers who endorse stereotypes that Black people are more threatening than White people."

=== Race and sentencing ===
Over the past 70 years, researching the impact that racial identity has on sentencing outcomes has been at the forefront of criminology. But, many studies contradict each other. Some studies found that minorities receive harsher sentences than Whites, while others found that minorities received lighter punishments. In a study done from 2011 to 2014, that followed 302 men and women in drug related convictions found that Blacks were actually convicted at a lower rate than other ethnicities, but had 2.5 more incarcerations on average.

A 2011 study which examined violent crime trends between 1980 and 2008 found that racial imbalances between arrest and incarceration levels were both small and comparably sized across the study period. The authors argued that the prior studies had been confounded by not separating Hispanics from Whites. Another recent study in 2012 raises a different concern, showing that Hispanics and Blacks receive considerably longer sentences for the same or lesser offenses on average than White offenders with equal or greater criminal records.

A 2012 University of Michigan Law School study found that African Americans are given longer federal sentences even when factoring prior criminal records, and that African American jail sentences tend to be roughly 10% longer than White jail sentences for the same crimes. The study found that federal prosecutors of African American and Hispanic defendants are almost twice as likely to push for mandatory minimum sentences, leading to longer sentences and disparities in incarceration rates for federal offenses.

Numerous studies have been conducted to examine whether race is associated with sentence length or severity. An early study by Joan Petersilia found that in California, Michigan, and Texas, Hispanics and Blacks tended to receive harsher sentences than Whites convicted of comparable crimes and with similar criminal records. A 1998 meta-analysis found that the relationship between race and sentencing in the U.S. was not statistically significant, but that the use of different methods of classifying race may also mask the true race-sentencing relationship. A study published the same year, which examined sentencing data from Pennsylvania, found that young Black men were sentenced more harshly than were members of any other age-race-gender combination. Similarly, a 2005 meta-analysis found that Blacks tended to receive harsher sentences than did Whites, and that this effect was "statistically significant but small and highly variable."

A 2006 study found that Blacks and Hispanics received about 10% longer sentences than Whites, even after controlling for all possible relevant characteristics, with regard to final offenses. However, when the researchers examined base offenses instead, the disparity was reversed. The study concludes that the racial disparity in sentencing comes from the different racial groups abilities to pay fines and other factors which are poorly accounted for (wealth) A 2010 analysis of U.S. Sentencing Commission data found that Blacks received the longest sentences of any ethnicity within each gender group (specifically, their sentence lengths were on average 91 months for men and 36 months for women). A 2011 study found that Black women with lighter perceived skin tones tended to receive more lenient sentences and serve less of them behind bars. A 2012 study looking at felony case data from Cook County, Illinois found that the sentencing disparity between Blacks and Whites varied significantly from judge to judge, which the authors state provides "support for the model where at least some judges treat defendants differently based on their race." A 2013 report by the U.S. Sentencing Commission found that Black men's prison sentences were on average almost 20% longer than those of their White counterparts who were convicted of similar crimes.

A 2015 study focusing primarily on Black and White men in Georgia uncovered that, on average, Black men received sentences that were 4.25% higher than Whites for the same type of crime. However, the same study found a larger disparity in sentence length among medium- and dark-skinned Blacks, who received 4.8% longer sentences than Whites, whereas light-skinned Blacks received sentences of about the same average length as those of Whites. It is also documented that, in the United States as a whole, Latinos, African Americans, and American Indians are far more frequently convicted than White Americans, and they receive harsher and longer punishments than their White counterparts for committing the same crimes.

According to a 2001 study, Hispanics and Blacks receive an average sentencing of 54.1 and 64.1 months, respectively, while Whites receive an average of 32.1 months. 77,236 offenders, sentenced under the Sentencing Reform Act of 1984, were evaluated to control for extraneous variables other than race, but these findings remain relevant despite the fact that the offenders committed the same offense and received sentencing from the same district court. This finding is consistent across jurisdictions in multiple states within the U.S., and direct discrimination was found to be more prominent at the federal level. There are many theorists who attempt to explain why these disparities exist. Racial stereotypes and related factors such as socioeconomic status may influence the court's perception of the individual as well as its decision-making. For instance, judges may perceive minority defendants as unable to afford fines or probation fees. Consequently, they resort to jail term as opposed to community corrections sentence.

A 2014 study revealed that judges subconsciously utilize the assumption that minorities are more likely to recidivate to issue a longer sentencing that will prevent the defendants from reengaging in criminal offenses. Additionally, theorists advocate that minorities are stereotypically identified as more violent and guilty than Whites. This perception encourages judges to believe that they are preventing the onset of future crimes by imprisoning the defendants for a longer duration. This preconception that minorities are unable to economically support themselves warns the judicial system that they are more likely to resort to criminal activity in order to gain access to money or other objectives. Because these characteristics are less associated with White offenders, judges unintentionally treat the two differently. The short amount of time that judges share with defendants in court is insufficient in establishing an objective understanding. As a result, judges may unconsciously utilize the factors that they are given, such as the color of the skin, to construct an impression. Prejudgments on the basis of race influence perception of responsibility and threat to the society.

Research also suggests that there is discrimination by the judicial system, which contributes to a higher number of convictions and unfavorable sentencing for racial minorities. A 2012 study found that "(i) juries formed from all-White jury pools convict Black defendants significantly (16 percentage points) more often than White defendants, and (ii) this gap in conviction rates is entirely eliminated when the jury pool includes at least one Black member." Research has found evidence of in-group bias, where "Black (White) juveniles who are randomly assigned to Black (White) judges are more likely to get incarcerated (as opposed to being placed on probation), and they receive longer sentences."

A 2014 study in the Journal of Political Economy found that 9% of the Black-White gap in sentencing could not be accounted for. The elimination of unexplained sentencing disparities would reduce "the level of Black men in federal prison by 8,000–11,000 men [out of Black male prison population of 95,000] and save $230–$320 million per year in direct costs." The majority of the unexplained sentencing disparity appears to occur at the point when prosecutors decide to bring charges carrying "mandatory minimum" sentences. A 2018 paper by Alma Cohen and Crystal Yang of Harvard Law School found that "Republican-appointed judges give substantially longer prison sentences to Black offenders versus observably similar non-Black offenders compared to Democratic-appointed judges within the same district court." A 2018 study in the Quarterly Journal of Economics found that bail judges in Miami and Philadelphia were racially biased against Black defendants, as White defendants had higher rates of pretrial misconduct than Black defendants.

In criminal sentencing, medium to dark-skinned African Americans are likely to receive sentences 2.6 years longer than those of Whites or light-skinned African Americans. When a White victim is involved, those with more "Black" features are likely to receive a much more severe punishment. A 2018 National Bureau of Economic Research experiment found that law students, economics students and practicing lawyers who watched 3D Virtual Reality videos of court trials (where the researchers altered the race of the defendants) showed a racial bias against minorities.

A 2016 report by the Sarasota Herald-Tribune found that Florida judges sentence Black defendants to far longer prison sentences than Whites with the same background. For the same drug possession crimes, Blacks were sentenced to double the time of Whites. Blacks were given longer sentences in 60 percent of felony cases, 68 percent of the most serious first-degree crimes, 45 percent of burglary cases and 30 percent of battery cases. For third-degree felonies (the least serious types of felonies in Florida), White judges sentenced Blacks to twenty percent more time than Whites, whereas Black judges gave more balanced sentences.

A 2017 report by the Marshall Project found that killings of Black men by White civilians were far more likely to be deemed "justifiable" than killings by any other combination of races, although it cautioned that the disparity may be warranted by differing circumstances and not the result of racial prejudice.

A 2017 report by the United States Sentencing Commission (USSC) found, "after controlling for a wide variety of sentencing factors" (such as age, education, citizenship, weapon possession and prior criminal history), that "Black male offenders received sentences on average 19.1 percent longer than similarly situated White male offenders."

A 2018 study in the American Economic Journal: Applied Economics found that judges gave longer sentences, in particular to Black defendants, after their favorite team lost a home game.

A 2019 audit study found that lawyers are less likely to take on clients with Black-sounding names than White-sounding names.

=== Race and the death penalty ===
US homicide victims by race, 1980–2008

US homicide convictions by race, 1980–2008

Various scholars have addressed what they perceived as the systemic racial bias present in the administration of capital punishment in the United States. There is also a large disparity between races when it comes to sentencing convicts to Death Row. The federal death penalty data released by the United States Department of Justice between 1995 and 2000 shows that 682 defendants were sentenced to death. Out of those 682 defendants, the defendant was Black in 48% of the cases, Hispanic in 29% of the cases, and White in 20% of the cases.^{[3]} 52.5% of people who were convicted of homicide in the 1980-2005 time period were Black.

A 2016 study from the American Psychological Association, "Discrimination and Instructional Comprehension", researched how the lack of comprehension of capital penalty jury instructions, relates to death sentencing in America. This study was composed of eligible subjects, who were given the option to sentence a verdict based on their comprehension from the given instructions and their evidence. The study concluded that multiple verdicts who could not comprehend the penalty instructions, had a higher death sentence probability.

Some researchers have suggested that there is a "white victim effect" in the application capital punishment in the US, which is where defendants, particularly black defendants, who kill white victims are more likely to receive the death penalty than other victim-defendant combinations (such as black victim-black defendant or black victim-white defendant), though the existence of this effect remains debated. For example, one 2014 study on the application of the death penalty in Connecticut over the period 1973–2007 found "that minority defendants who kill White victims are capitally charged at substantially higher rates than minority defendants who kill minorities... There is also strong and statistically significant evidence that minority defendants who kill Whites are more likely to end up with capital sentences than comparable cases with White defendants." Conversely, another 2014 study focusing on North Carolina argued that the "white victim effect" was largely driven by confounders (such as aggravating and mitigating factors) and that controlling for these rendered the effect insignificant. A similar argument was made by a 2017 study.

=== Race and incarceration ===
2010. Inmates in adult facilities, by race and ethnicity. Jails, and state and federal prisons.
Race, ethnicity	% of US population	% of U.S. incarcerated population	National incarceration rate (per 100,000 of all ages)
White (non-Hispanic)	64	39	450 per 100,000
Hispanic	16	19	831 per 100,000
Black	13	40	2,306 per 100,000
Asian	5.6	1.5	210 per 100,000

According to the United States Bureau of Justice, in 2014 6% of all Black males ages 30 to 39 were in prison, while 2% of Hispanic and 1% of White males in the same age group were in prison. There were 2,724 Black male prisoners with sentences over one year per 100,000 Black male residents in the United States, and a total of 516,900 Black male sentenced prisoners in the United States as of December 31, 2014. This compares to 1,091 Hispanic male prisoners per 100,000 Hispanic male residents, and 465 White male prisoners per 100,000 White male residents in the United States at that time. Black males between the ages of 18 and 19 had a rate of imprisonment 10.5 times that of White males of the same age group in 2014. Studies have found that a decreasing percentage of the overrepresentation of Blacks in the U.S. criminal justice system can be explained by racial differences in offending: 80% in 1979, 76% in 1991, and 61% in 2004.

According to the Bureau of Justice Statistics, Blacks accounted for 39.4% of the prison and jail population in 2009, while non-Hispanic Whites were 34.2%, and Hispanics (of any race) 20.6%. The incarceration rate of Black males was over six times as high as White males, with a rate of 4,749 per 100,000 US residents.

According to a report by the National Council of La Raza, research obstacles undermine the census of Latinos in prison, and "Latinos in the criminal justice system are seriously undercounted." A study regarding the Violent Crime Control and Law Enforcement Act concluded due to mandatory sentencing Blacks have a 1 in 3 chance of spending some time in prison or jail. Latinos 1 in 6 chance and Whites, a 1 in 17.

According to the 2010 US Census, Hispanics constituted 16.3% of the US population. According to the BJS, the Black incarceration rate in state and federal prisons declined to 3,161 per 100,000 and the White incarceration rate slightly increased to 487 per 100,000. In 2009, indigenous Americans and Alaskan indigenous people were jailed, paroled, or on probation at 932 per 100,000, 25% higher than for non-indigenous (747), up 5.6% that year and 12% higher than 2007. However, crime in general declined during this time down to near 1970 levels, an 18% decrease from the previous decade.

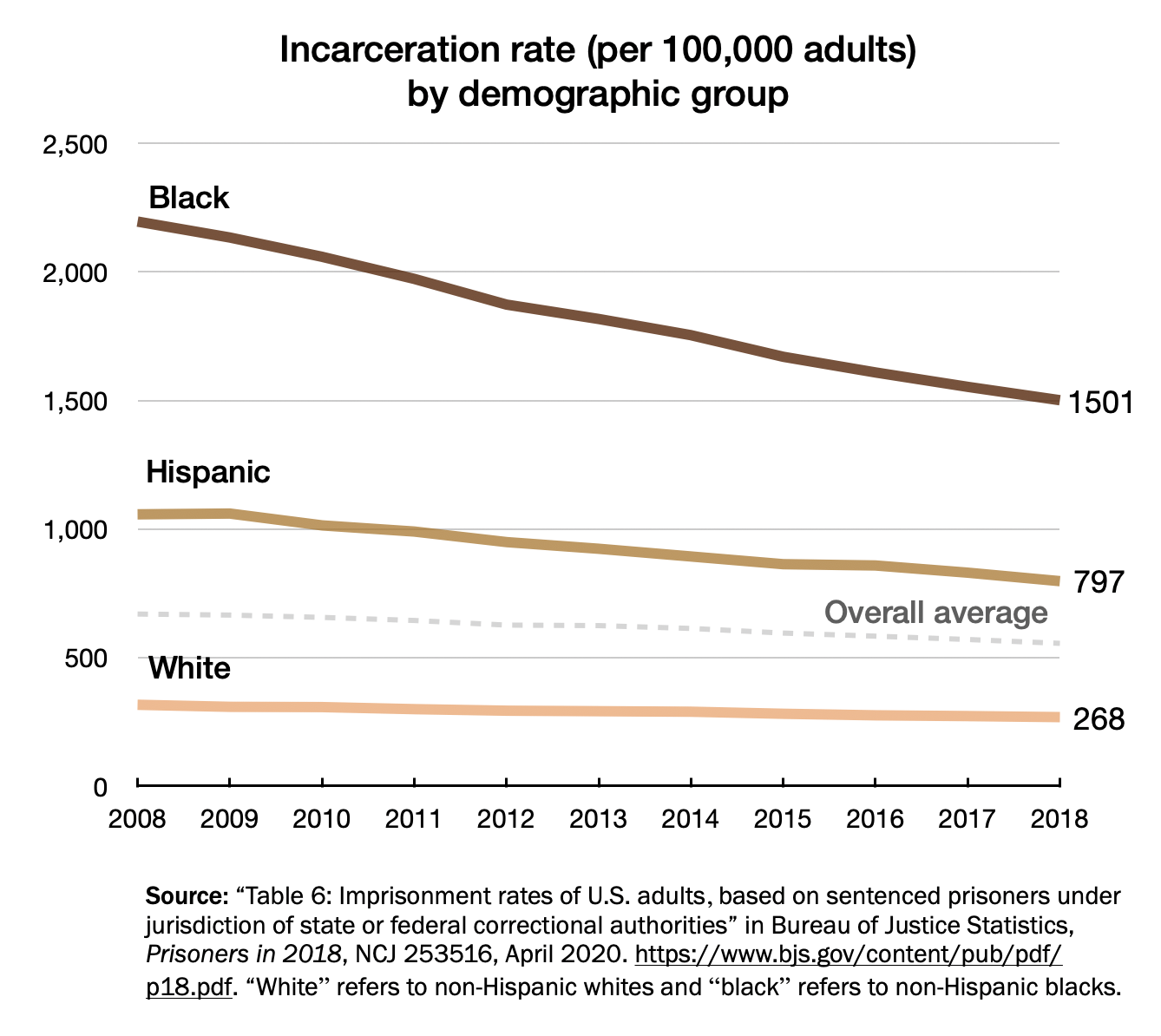
Line graph comparing the United States incarceration rate, per 100,000 adults, among Black, Hispanic, and White adults, 2008–2018

The ratio between the imprisonment rate of Blacks and non-Hispanic Whites declined each year between 2006 and 2016. The ratio fell from 6.98 in 2006 to 5.78 in 2016. The disparity between the incarceration rate of Hispanics and non-Hispanic Whites fell slightly over the same period from 3.31 in 2006 to 3.13 in 2016.

State prisons house almost all the offenders convicted of a violent crime in each respective state. In contrast to federal prisons, state prisons mostly consist of violent offenders. The disparities in imprisonment by race varies greatly between different states and regions in the US. In 2014, 12 states had majority Black prison populations and 1 state (New Mexico) majority Hispanic. African Americans were overrepresented relative to their population to varying degrees in every US state. The ratio in imprisonment between Blacks and non-Hispanic Whites was highest in New Jersey (12.2), Wisconsin (11.5) and Iowa (11.1). Racial disparities in imprisonment between Blacks and non-Hispanic Whites are much lower than average in most of the Southern United States with the lowest disparities being in the states of Hawaii (2.4), Mississippi (3.0) and Georgia (3.2). The only region with a large overrepresentation in imprisonment rate of Hispanics relative to non-Hispanic Whites is the Northeastern United States.

A 2016 analysis by The New York Times "of tens of thousands of disciplinary cases against inmates in 2015, hundreds of pages of internal reports and three years of parole decisions found that racial disparities were embedded in the prison experience in New York." Blacks and Latinos were sent more frequently to solitary and held there for longer durations than Whites. The New York Times analysis found that the disparities were the greatest for violations where the prison guards had much discretion, such as disobeying orders, but smaller for violations that required physical evidence, such as possessing contraband.

=== Race and recidivism ===
A study that considered 34,794 federal offenders took into account the race, risk assessment, and future arrests of all participating members of the sample. Though the use of the Post Conviction Risk Assessment (PCRA), which proved to be highly accurate in predicting whether or not Whites and Blacks would return to prison after being released, showed that recidivism correlates less with race and more with criminal history.

Other studies suggest that recidivism rates as related to race vary based on state. For example, the Alabama Department of Corrections performed a study where they tracked 2003 releases for three years. In that time span, 29% of both African American and White males that were released returned to prison, 20% of African American females that were released returned to prison, and 24% of White females returned to prison. The Florida Department of Corrections performed a similar study; they tracked 2001 releases for 5 years. They found that 45% of African American males were reincarcerated and 28% of non-African American males were reincarcerated.

=== Race and habitual offender sentencing ===
There are two main studies that analyze the issue of habitual offenders in regards to race. Both were mostly conducted by Western Michigan University professor Charles Crawford. Published in 1998 and 2000, both studies focused on habitual offenders in the state of Florida. Crawford's studies found that Black defendants in Florida were significantly more likely to be sentenced as habitual offenders than were Whites, and that this effect was significantly larger for drug offenses and property crimes of which Whites are often the victims.

Examining both individual level and county level variables, a new study from 2008 updated and evaluated Crawford's work. It affirmed that sentencing policies are becoming harsher, and habitual offender statutes are currently just another tool that lawmakers use to incarcerate minorities at a higher rate than their White counterparts. The 2008 study concluded that habitual offender statutes can only continue to be used if they are used in a way that completely disregards race and is unbiased.

=== Race and presidential pardons ===
According to a 2011 ProPublica analysis, "Whites are nearly four times as likely as minorities to win a [presidential] pardon, even when the type of crime and severity of sentence are taken into account."

== Race in the juvenile justice system ==
In the United States, racial disparities in the juvenile justice system are partly, but not entirely, due to racial differences in offending; differences in treatment by the justice system also appear to play a role.

A 1994 study found that Black and Hispanic youths were more likely to be detained at each of the three stages of the juvenile justice system examined (police detention, court intake detention, and preliminary hearing detention), even after controlling for other factors such as offense seriousness. Other studies have reached similar conclusions. A 2014 study looking at juvenile dispositional decisions found that minority juveniles were more likely than their White counterparts to be committed to physical regimen-oriented facilities than their White counterparts were, which the authors suggested was due to court actors using "a racialized perceptual shorthand of youthful offenders that attributes both higher levels of blame and lower evaluations of reformability to minority youth." Research suggests the racial disparities in assessments of juvenile offenders, and the resulting sentence recommendations, result from officials attributing different causes of crime to cases based on the race of the offender. According to a 1982 study, racial bias in juvenile justice decisions is more pronounced in police decisions than in judicial ones.

Black and Latino juvenile offenders are also vastly more likely to be tried as adults by local prosecutors throughout the US, and are generally likelier to be given harsher, longer sentences by the judges presiding over their trials.

A study of New Jersey juvenile court records for the years 2010-2015 released by WNYC late in 2016 found that Black and Latino offenders comprised almost 90% of juveniles tried as adults (849 Black youths, 247 Latino out of a total of 1,251 juveniles tried as adults during the five-year period, thereby Black/Hispanic teens represented 87.6% of the total cases.) WNYC also surveyed all NJ inmates currently serving sentences which resulted from crimes committed as a minor, and found that 93% of them are Black or Latino. These numbers represent a clear racial disparity in sentencing, particularly so, given the fact that during this period New Jersey was only 14.8% Black and 19.7% Hispanic, in comparison to 56.2% of the state's residents being White. "Controlling for nature of offense...for family background...for educational history—all of the things that go into a prosecutor's decision, there are still disparities, significant disparities, that cannot be explained by anything other than race," says Laura Cohen, the director of the Criminal and Youth Justice Clinic at Rutgers Law School.

These numbers are comparable to the juvenile detention and sentencing trends for the country as a whole, analysis of which shows that roughly 60% of all juveniles who received life sentences after being tried as adults are Black. Judges, prosecutors, juries, and police/detention officers all commonly perceive Black children as less innocent and childlike than White children. Black teens are commonly over-estimated in age by an average of 4.5 years, meaning that Black boys as young as 13 could conceivably be seen as fully 18 years old, and thereby easily acceptable for overzealous prosecutors to treat as an adult defendant. This tendency to round Black teens up to adults is detailed in a 2014 study by the American Psychological Association entitled: "The Essence of Innocence: Consequences of Dehumanizing Black Children".

== Race and the war on drugs ==
The first U.S. law that restricted the distribution and use of certain drugs was the Harrison Narcotics Tax Act of 1914. The first local laws came as early as 1860.

The Federal Bureau of Narcotics was established in the United States Department of the Treasury by an act of June 14, 1930 (46 Stat. 585).

In 1935, President Franklin D. Roosevelt publicly supported the adoption of the Uniform State Narcotic Drug Act. The New York Times used the headline "Roosevelt Asks Narcotic War Aid".

In 1937, the Marijuana Transfer Tax Act was passed. Several scholars have claimed that the goal was to destroy the hemp industry, largely as an effort of businessmen Andrew Mellon, Randolph Hearst, and the Du Pont family. These scholars argue that with the invention of the decorticator, hemp became a very cheap substitute for the paper pulp that was used in the newspaper industry. These scholars believe that Hearst felt that this was a threat to his extensive timber holdings. Mellon, United States Secretary of the Treasury and the wealthiest man in America, had invested heavily in the DuPont's new synthetic fiber, nylon, and considered its success to depend on its replacement of the traditional resource, hemp. However, there were circumstances that contradict these claims. One reason for doubts about those claims is that the new decorticators did not perform fully satisfactorily in commercial production. To produce fiber from hemp was a labor-intensive process if you include harvest, transport and processing. Technological developments decreased the labor with hemp but not sufficient to eliminate this disadvantage.

Although Nixon declared "drug abuse" to be public enemy number one in 1971, the policies that his administration implemented as part of the Comprehensive Drug Abuse Prevention and Control Act of 1970 were a continuation of drug prohibition policies in the U.S., which started in 1914.

In 1982, President Ronald Reagan officially declared war on drugs. The President increased federal spending on anti-drug related programs. He also greatly increased the number of United States federal drug task forces. Ensuring a lasting impact, Reagan also launched a campaign marked by rhetoric that both demonized drugs and drug users. The United States Executive branch employed two types of anti-drug strategies during the war on drugs: supply-reduction and demand-reduction. Supply-reduction strategies typically involved limiting access to drug sources and employing harsher penalties for drug possession and distribution. Demand-reduction strategies included drug use treatment and prevention. The Reagan administration favored supply-reduction strategies and focused their efforts on the seizure of illegal substances and prosecution of individuals caught in possession of these substances.

The controversy surrounding the war on drugs is still widely debated by the academic community. In March 2016, former Nixon domestic policy chief John Ehrlichman told a writer for Harper's magazine that "the Nixon campaign in 1968, and the Nixon White House after that, had two enemies: the antiwar left and Black people". He then went on to elaborate further, saying: "knew we couldn't make it illegal to be either against the war or Black, but by getting the public to associate the hippies with marijuana and Blacks with heroin. And then criminalizing both heavily, we could disrupt those communities". This recent comment by Ehrlichman made headlines primarily because it was the first instance of any person who was ever affiliated with the Presidential administration publicly framing the drug war as a political tactic to assist Nixon's win.

Many scholars believe that the war on drugs had a large impact on minority communities across the nation. In particular, African American communities were affected by the political implications of the new drug policies. It has been noted that throughout The War of Drugs, African Americans were investigated, detained, arrested, and charged with using, possessing, and distributing illegal drugs at a level disproportionate to that of the general population.

William J. Bennett, John J. Dilulio, Jr., and John P. Walters' moral poverty theory counter argues that the increase in juvenile crime and drug use during the 1980s and 1990s is due to children's lack of adult role models in their upbringing, such as parents, teachers, and guardians. They argue that children born out of wedlock are more likely to commit crimes, and they use this argument to explain the higher rate of crime for African American youth compared to that of White youth in the United States.

== Causes of racial disproportionality ==
=== In the criminal justice system overall ===
Two competing hypotheses exist regarding why racial/ethnic minorities, especially African Americans, are overrepresented in the criminal justice system compared to their share of the general population. These are the differential offending or differential involvement hypothesis, which proposes that this overrepresentation is a result of African Americans committing more of the crimes that result in criminal justice processing, and the differential selection hypothesis, which proposes that this disproportionality is a result of discrimination by the criminal justice system. Piquero (2008) argues that it is difficult, if not impossible, to determine which of these factors is more important than the other.

The criminal justice system in the United States has a very large imbalance in the composition of races, specifically between Blacks and Whites, incarcerated. Alfred Blumstein states, "Although Blacks comprise roughly one-eighth of the population, they represent about one-half of the prison population. Thus, the race-specific incarceration rates are grossly disproportionate." The research done by Alfred Blumstein and the apparent dis-proportionality raise the problem of injustice within the United States criminal justice system. This injustice is alluded to further, but not directly linked to racial injustice, because Black males are the victims of having an incarceration rate twenty five times higher than that of the total population.

Education may also be a factor that plays into this dis-proportionality. Studies done from 1965 to 1969 based on administrative data, surveys, and census data showed that 3 percent of Whites and 20 percent of Blacks served time in prison by their early thirties. Thirty years later in 1999, risk of incarceration was partially dependent on education with 30 percent of college dropouts and roughly 60 percent of high school dropouts going to prison. Education playing a role in either increasing or decreasing the likelihood of incarceration based upon the education and skill a person possesses.

Further research shows that there have been significant strides into diving deeper to explain why racial/ethnic minorities are incarcerated at a higher rate than the rest of the population. In a manual by the Sentencing Project, they emphasize four commonly identified causes of racial disparity in the criminal justice system; higher crime rates, inequitable access to resources, legislative decisions, and overt racial bias. "While some claim that minority overrepresentation in the justice system is solely the result of people of color committing more crime, empirical analyses do not support this claim." Studies have shown that a variety of factors could explain the racial disparity; "law enforcement practices, crime rates, and punitive sentencing policies." The level of crime rates show that minorities commit more crimes but that does not account for crimes that go unreported.

An inequitable access to resources can result in "very different outcomes between middle-class and low-income individuals even though they may share similar behavioral problems." Communities that have more resources tend to find a different approach to treating behavioral problems that does not involve juvenile or criminal justice system. Resources are more available to middle-class parents than to lower income parents. "The misallocation of resources within the criminal justice system can compound the disparate experiences of minority defendants as they move through the system."

Legislatures have been enacting the laws that define prohibited behavior and the penalties for these violations since the very beginning. Many of which have a "disproportionate impact on minority communities." Some areas that have been significant in this regard were the war on drugs in the 1980s that accounts for a lot of the people of color that are in prison for the use of crack cocaine. Then there is the Three Strikes Legislation, that assigns "mandatory sentences of life without parole for three time repeat felony offenders." Next, is the overreliance on incarceration, in the last couple of decades punitive laws have begun to pass, increasing the population of prison and jail. Despite lacking evidence that describes prison as the most effective approach to control crime. Lastly, the authors of 'Reducing Racial Disparity in the Criminal Justice System' state that "So long as racism exists within society at large, it will be found within the criminal justice system. Racism fuels the overt bias which can show in the language, attitudes, conduct, assumptions, strategies and policies of criminal justice agencies." Research has shown that there is an overt racial bias in the criminal justice decision making. In the way police interact with the community, how minorities in the courtroom are addressed, as well as how prison officials interact with inmates' family members. People are likely to identify with those who look like them and that does not exempt criminal justice practitioners.

Ulmer findings suggest that "most disproportionality (particularly in Federal courts) is determined by processes prior to sentencing, especially sentencing policies that differentially impact minority males." They found that there is a 25-30% unexplained difference between arrest and incarceration and that disproportionality you need to understand the role that prosecutors, judges, and probation and parole officers contribute.

=== In incarceration rates ===
Blacks had a higher chance of going to prison especially those who had dropped out of high school. If a Black male dropped out of high school, he had an over 50% chance of being incarcerated in his lifetime, as compared to an 11% chance for White male high school dropouts. Socio-economic, geographic, and educational disparities, as well as alleged unequal treatment in the criminal justice system, contributed to this gap in incarceration rates by race.

Failure to achieve literacy (reading at "grade level") by the third or fourth grade makes the likelihood of future incarceration twenty times more likely than other students. Some states use this measurement to predict how much prison space they will require in the future. It appears to be a poverty issue rather than a race issue.

Some studies suggest that minorities are targeted at disproportionate rates and sent to prison for reasons that are ignored for non-minorities. When the citizens who have been arrested can no longer support themselves the legal route, they might decide to turn to the underground world of crime. This decision can lead to harm upon oneself, open the door to addiction, and possible re-arrest which repeats the cycle of sending minorities to prison. It was found in 2010 that "the United States imprisoned a larger percentage of its Black population than South Africa did at the height of the Apartheid." This shows a clear occurrence of disproportionate racial incarceration.

In a 2013 study, Beaver et al. found that the increased likelihood of African American males of being arrested and incarcerated compared to White males was entirely accounted for by adjusting for both self-reported violence and IQ. However, a 2015 study found that African American males only had a higher likelihood to commit violent crime than White males, with a similar likelihood to commit property crime and a lower likelihood to consume drugs. This study used a notably larger sample size than Beaver et al. (n=18060 compared to n=1197 since Beaver et al. limited themselves to looking at those with complete data on race, age, IQ, and self-reported lifetime violence), and failed to observe consistent effects of race for different offenses. They went so far as to posit "The inconsistent pattern challenges the stereotypical image of the criminality of Black communities. It is also a challenge to the idea that crime theories can explain race differences."

According to the US Census Bureau as of the year 2000, there were 2,224,181 Blacks enrolled in college. In that same year, there were 610,300 Black inmates in prison according to the Bureau of Justice Statistics. The results are highly correlated with education. 30 percent of those without college education and nearly 60 percent of high school dropouts had prison records.

== Effects on families and neighborhoods ==
According to Dorothy Roberts the current prison system serves as a punitive system in which mass incarceration has become the response to problems in society. Field studies regarding prison conditions describe behavioral changes produced by prolonged incarceration, and conclude that imprisonment undermines the social life of inmates by exacerbating criminality or impairing their capacity for normal social interaction. Roberts further argues this racial disparity in imprisonment, particularly with African Americans, subjects them to political subordination by destroying their positive connection with society. Roberts also argues that institutional factors – such as the prison industrial complex itself – become enmeshed in everyday lives, so much so that prisons no longer function as "law enforcement" systems. It has also been argued that Latinos have been overlooked in the debate over the criminal justice system. It has also been suggested that differences in the way the criminal justice system treats Blacks and Whites decreases legitimacy, which, in turn, increases criminal behavior, leading to further increases in racial disparities in interactions with the criminal justice system.

Crime in poorer urban neighborhoods is linked to increased rates of mass incarceration, as job opportunities decline and people turn to crime for survival. Crime among low-education men is often linked to the economic decline among unskilled workers. These economic problems are also tied to reentry into society after incarceration. Data from the Washington State Department of Corrections and Employment Insurance records show how "the wages of Black ex-inmates grow about 21 percent more slowly each quarter after release than the wages of White ex-inmates". A conviction leads to all sorts of social, political, and economic disadvantages for felons, and has been dubbed the "new civil death" (Chin 2012, 179). In the aggregate, these obstacles make it difficult for released inmates to transition to society successfully, which, in turn, makes it difficult for these communities to achieve social stability.

Black ex-inmates earn 10 percent less than White ex-inmates post incarceration on average.

=== Black women ===
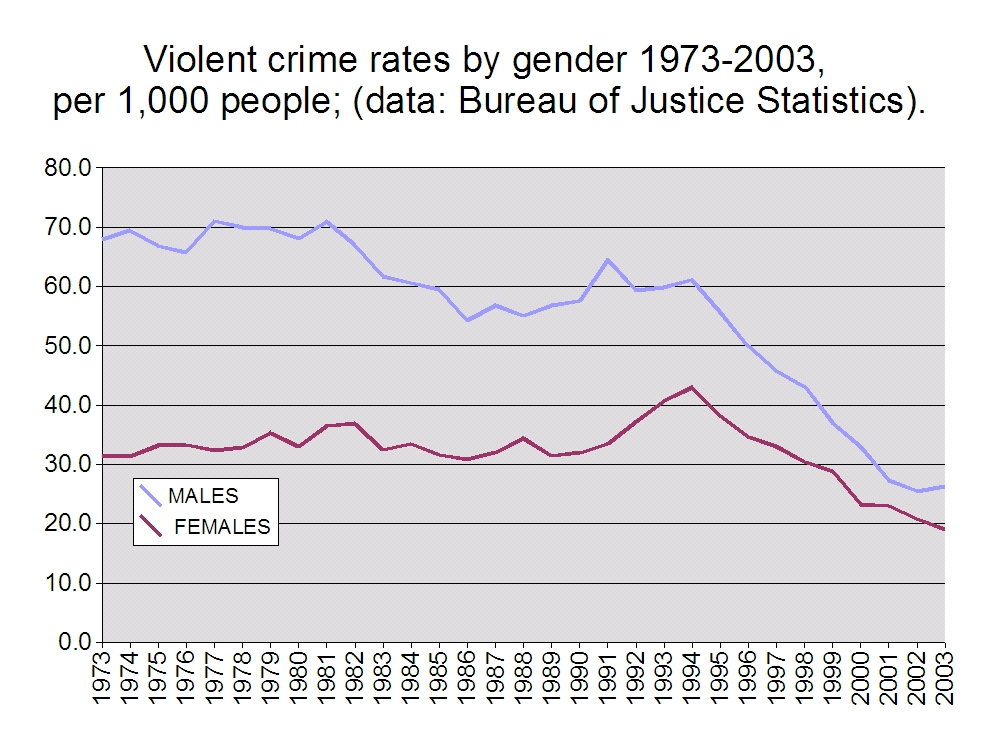
Violent crime rates by gender in the U.S. from 1973 to 2003

Problems resulting from mass incarceration extend beyond economic and political aspects to reach community lives as well. According to the U.S. Department of Justice, 46% of Black female inmates were likely to have grown up in a home with only their mothers. A study by Bresler and Lewis shows how incarcerated African American women were more likely to have been raised in a single female headed household while incarcerated White women were more likely to be raised in a two parent household. Black women's lives are often shaped by the prison system because they have intersecting familial and community obligations. The "increase incarceration of Black men and the sex ratio imbalance it induces shape the behavior of young Black women".

Education, fertility, and employment for Black women are affected due to increased mass incarceration. Black women's employment rates were increased, shown in Mechoulan's data, due to increased education. Higher rates of Black male incarceration lowered the odds of nonmarital teenage motherhood and Black women's ability to get an educational degree, thus resulting in early employment. Whether incarcerated themselves or related to someone who was incarcerated, women are often conformed into stereotypes of how they are supposed to behave yet are isolated from society at the same time.

Furthermore, this system can disintegrate familial life and structure. Black and Latino youth are more likely to be incarcerated after coming in contact with the American juvenile justice system. According to a study by Victor Rios, 75% of prison inmates in the United States are Black and Latinos between the ages of 20 and 39. Rios further argued that, societal institutions – such as schools, families, and community centers can impact youth by initiating them into this "system of criminalization" from an early age. Rios argues that these institutions, which are traditionally set up to protect the youth, contribute to mass incarceration by mimicking the criminal justice system.

From a different perspective, parents in prison face further moral and emotional dilemmas because they are separated from their children. Both Black and White women face difficulty with where to place their children while incarcerated and how to maintain contact with them. According to the study by Bresler and Lewis, Black women are more likely to leave their children with related kin whereas White women's children are likely to be placed in foster care. In a report by the Bureau of Justice Statistics revealed how in 1999, seven percent of Black children had a parent in prison, making them nine times more likely to have an incarcerated parent than White children.

Having parents in prison can have adverse psychological effects as children are deprived of parental guidance, emotional support, and financial help. Because many prisons are located in remote areas, incarcerated parents face physical barriers in seeing their children and vice versa.

Societal influences, such as low education among African American men, can also lead to higher rates of incarceration. Imprisonment has become "disproportionately widespread among low-education Black men" in which the penal system has evolved to be a "new feature of American race and class inequality". Scholar Pettit and Western's research has shown how incarceration rates for African Americans are "about eight times higher than those for Whites", and prison inmates have less than "12 years of completed schooling" on average.

=== Post release ===
These factors all impact released prisoners who try to reintegrate into society. According to a national study, within three years of release, almost 7 in 10 will have been rearrested. Many released prisoners have difficulty transitioning back into societies and communities from state and federal prisons because the social environment of peers, family, community, and state level policies all impact prison reentry; the process of leaving prison or jail and returning to society. Men eventually released from prison will most likely return to their same communities, putting additional strain on already scarce resources as they attempt to garner the assistance they need to successfully reenter society. They also tend to come from disadvantaged communities as well and due to the lack of resources, these same men will continue along this perpetuating cycle.

A major challenge for prisoners re-entering society is obtaining employment, especially for individuals with a felony on their record. A study utilizing U.S. Census occupational data in New Jersey and Minnesota in 2000 found that "individuals with felon status would have been disqualified from approximately one out of every 6.5 occupations in New Jersey and one out of every 8.5 positions in Minnesota". It has also been argued that combination of race and criminal status of an individual will diminish the positive aspects of an individual and intensify stereotypes. From the viewpoint of employers, the racial stereotypes will be confirmed and encourage discrimination in the hiring process. As African Americans and Hispanics are disproportionately affected by felon status, these additional limitations on employment opportunity were shown to exacerbate racial disparities in the labor market.

== Calls for reform ==
There have been minor adjustments to reduce the incarceration rate in the United States on the state level. Some of these efforts include introducing Proposition 47 in 2014, which reclassified specific property and drug crimes, and the Rockefeller drug laws in 2009, which pressed extreme minimum sentences for minor drug offenses. According to The Sentencing Project, there can be other alterations made to lower the incarceration rate. Some changes include reducing the length of some sentences, making resources such as treatment for substance abuse available to all and investing in organizations that promote strong youth development.

== See also ==
- Legalized abortion and crime effect
- Race and crime
- Race and inequality in the United States
- Racial profiling in the United States
- Electronic monitoring in the United States
