= American Law and Economics Association =

U.S. professional organization

The American Law and Economics Association (ALEA), a United States organization founded in 1991, is focused on the advancement of economic understanding of law, and related areas of public policy and regulation. It promotes research in law and economics. The organization's official journal is the American Law and Economics Review, established in 1999.

== History ==
In January 1990, a meeting of scholars was convened by George Mason University Law School dean, Henry Manne, to discuss organizing a professional organization. The association was formally co-founded by George Priest, A. Mitchell Polinsky, and Steven Shavell, each of whom served a term as president during the ensuing decade.

A growing acceptance of legal and economic perspectives by judges, practitioners, and policy-makers became evident in the creation of parallel associations in Australia, Europe, Latin America, and Canada.

== Notable members ==
The founding board of directors was composed of representatives of major universities, including Berkeley, Emory, USC, Columbia, Harvard, Georgetown and MIT. In addition to Henry Manne, and the three formal founders, Priest, Polinsky, and Shavell, each of whom served a term as president during the ensuing decade; other notable members include:

- Harold See
- Bruce M. Owen
- Roland Kirstein
- Orley Ashenfelter founding co-editor-in-chief, American Law and Economics Review
- Robert Cooter, among those convened by Henry Manne prior to formation of ALEA, was elected as a founding board member, and served as its president for 1994
- Robert C. Ellickson, 2000 president
- John J. Donohue III 2011 president
- Gillian Hadfield, board member
- Oliver Hart, 2006 president
- Richard Posner, founding co-editor-in-chief, American Law and Economics Review
- William M. Landes, 1992 president
- Ariel Porat, former board member; president of Tel Aviv University
- Michael Trebilcock, 2002 president

== See also ==
- Regional and international law and economics associations
- Pure economic loss in English law
