= John J. Donohue III =

American economist (born 1953)

- Born: January 30, 1953 (age 73)

Academic background
- Education: Harvard University, Yale University

Academic work
- Discipline: Legal studies, law and economics, economic policy
- Awards: Member of the American Academy of Arts and Sciences, former president of the American Law and Economics Association
- Website: Information at IDEAS / RePEc

John J. Donohue III is an American law professor, economist, and the C. Wendell and Edith M. Carlsmith Professor of Law at Stanford Law School. He is widely known for his writings on effect of legalized abortion on crime and for his criticism of John Lott's book More Guns, Less Crime.

== Biography ==
Donohue was born on January 30, 1953. He received his BA from Hamilton College in 1974, his JD from Harvard in 1977, and his Ph.D. in economics from Yale in 1986. In 1982, during his first year in graduate school at Yale, Donohue unsuccessfully sought the Democratic nomination for the Connecticut State Senate in the 14th District (Milford, Orange, West Haven).

He was a law professor at Stanford University from 1995 to 2004, then was a professor of law at Yale Law School from 2004 to 2010. Donohue rejoined the Stanford Law School faculty in 2010.

Donohue was president of the American Law and Economics Association for 2012 and was co-editor of the American Law and Economics Review from May 2006 through August 2012.

=== Research and writings ===
Donohue is well known for using empirical analysis to determine the impact of law and public policy in a wide range of areas.

Donohue teamed with the Nobel Prize Winning Economist James Heckman to author a major study evaluating the contribution of federal antidiscrimination efforts in improving the economic status of blacks in the 1960s.

He also coauthored an article with Peter Siegelman that explored ways to reduce crime that were less socially costly than further increases in incarceration.

He and University of Chicago economist Steven Levitt wrote a series of articles examining the extent to which the legalization of abortion in the 1970s—which substantially reduced the number of unwanted births—led to reductions in crime in the 1990s. According to Foote & Goetz (2008), their 2001 paper contained major mistakes in how they estimated their results and that once these errors were corrected there was no longer any relationship between abortion and crime. Donohue & Levitt responded to Foote & Goetz's critique in the same issue of the Quarterly Journal of Economics in which it appeared. They stated, "Correcting our mistake does not alter the sign or statistical significance of our estimates, although it does reduce their magnitude." They also presented additional evidence they claimed supported a negative effect of legalized abortion on crime. This work was popularized by the book Freakonomics.

He has also written a number of articles, many with Yale Law Professor Ian Ayres, exploring the impact on crime of laws allowing citizens to carry concealed handguns.

A series of papers with economist Justin Wolfers questioned studies that claimed to find a deterrent effect of capital punishment on the rate of murder.

Donohue also authored a major study of the operation of the Connecticut death penalty system that was widely cited in the legislative debate that led to the abolition of the death penalty in Connecticut in April 2012.
