= Recidivism =

Person repeating an undesirable behavior following punishment

Recidivism (/rɪˈsɪdɪvɪzəm/; from Latin: recidivus 'recurring', derived from re- 'again' and cadere 'to fall') is the reversion of an individual to criminal behavior after they have been convicted of a prior offense, sentenced, and (presumably) corrected. It is the act of a person repeating an undesirable behavior after they have experienced negative consequences of that behavior, or have been trained to extinguish it. Recidivism is also used to refer to the percentage of former prisoners who are rearrested for a similar offense.

The term is frequently used in conjunction with criminal behavior and substance abuse. Recidivism is a synonym of relapse, which is more commonly used in medicine and in the disease model of addiction.

== Causes ==
A 2011 study found that harsh prison conditions, including isolation, tended to increase recidivism, though none of these effects were statistically significant. Various researchers have noted that prisoners are stripped of civil rights and are reluctantly absorbed into communities – which further increases their alienation and isolation. Other contributors to recidivism include the difficulties released offenders face in finding jobs, in renting apartments or in getting education. Owners of businesses will often refuse to hire a convicted felon and are at best hesitant, especially when filling any position that entails even minor responsibility or the handling of money (this includes most work), especially to those convicted of thievery, such as larceny, or to drug addicts. As of 2017, many leasing corporations (organizations and people who own and rent apartments) routinely perform criminal background checks and disqualify ex-convicts. However, especially in the inner city or in areas with high crime rates, lessors may not always apply their official policies in this regard. When they do, apartments may be rented by someone other than the occupant. People with criminal records report difficulty or inability to find educational opportunities, and are often denied financial aid based on their records.

== Prediction ==
The likelihood of recidivism for a previously convicted criminal can be predicted using structured professional judgement (SPJ) tools. This may help to reduce recidivism by measuring protective factors such as stable work, attitudes towards authority and living circumstances. Two tools used for SPJ include the HCR-20 and the newer SAPROF developed in the late 2010s. SPJ tools are also used in forensic psychiatry.

== Effect of employment ==
Most research regarding recidivism indicates that ex-inmates who obtain employment after release from prison tend to have lower rates of recidivism. One study found that ex-inmates, especially those over the age of 26, were less likely than their counterparts to commit crime if they secured employment, even when that employment was marginal. Another study found that ex-inmates were less likely to reoffend if they found and maintained stable employment throughout their first year of parole.

African Americans are disproportionately represented in the American prison system, representing approximately half the prison population. Of this population, many enter into the prison system with less than a high school diploma. The lack of education makes ex-inmates qualify for low-skill, low-wage employment. In addition to lack of education, many inmates report difficulty in finding employment prior to incarceration. If an ex-inmate served a long prison sentence, they have lost an opportunity to gain work experience or network with potential job employers. Because of this, employers and agencies that assist with employment believe that ex-inmates cannot obtain or maintain employment.

For African American ex-inmates, race may present an additional barrier to obtaining employment after release. According to one study, African American ex-inmates may be more likely to reoffend because the communities to which they return have fewer employment opportunities than those available to White ex-inmates.

== Effect of education ==
Educational programs in prisons have demonstrated significant benefits, particularly in reducing recidivism rates and improving post-release employment outcomes. As of 2014, approximately 67.8% of inmates were rearrested after three years and 76.6% after five years. However, when participating in educational programs, inmates can reduce their chances of recidivism by 5.1–43%. By participating in educational programs, inmates can improve their cognitive abilities and work skills, as well as being able to further their education upon release. Moreover, inmates with higher educational levels have lower odds of recidivism. For instance, inmates who have earned a vocational certificate reduce their likelihood of reoffending by 14.6% while those who have earned a GED reduce theirs by 25%. Inmates with an Associate of Arts or Associate of Science degree reduce their likelihood of reoffending by 70%.

Additionally, while taxpayers are adversely affected as their tax money goes into the prison system, educating inmates is cost effective. Investing in education can drastically reduce incarceration costs. For every dollar invested in prison education programs, incarceration costs could be reduced by four to five dollars during the first three years after release.

=== Three State Recidivism Study ===
Maryland, Minnesota and Ohio were involved in a study pertaining to education and recidivism. This study was conducted by the Correctional Education Association (CEA) for the US Department of Correctional Education from 1997 to 1998 and published in 2001. Stephen Steurer, Ph.D., researcher and Executive Director of the CEA, was the project director. The lead researcher, Linda Smith, Ph.D. and project manager, Alice Tracy, Ph.D. were principal researchers. Over 3,600 released inmates were examined to determine how educational participation while incarcerated impacted their post-release behavior. To establish the influence of education on recidivism, researchers interviewed inmates and collated their criminal history, educational data, and post-release data. With this information, it was determined that participation in prison education reduced recidivism rates by 29%.

The study also found that approximately two dollars in incarceration costs were saved for every dollar spent on correctional education. Maryland reported savings of at least $23.3 million against an annual correctional education budget of $11.7 million. Overall, education reduces recidivism rates which can reduce cost of incarceration as well as reduce the number of people who commit crime within the community.

=== Institutions and correctional facilities ===
Across the United States, 20–80% of incarcerated individuals have not earned a high school diploma or equivalent. Thus, all US prisons have basic and remedial education programs designed to provide incarcerated individuals with the opportunity to attain knowledge and skills equivalent to a high school diploma.

Some prisons offer vocational training. Vocational education directly prepares students for specific occupations rather than broad intellectual cultivation; common vocational training programs include carpentry, electrical work, landscaping, office services, and welding. Correctional facilities can offer reading and writing groups. This form of education is meant to use literature and writing as a form of therapy and can be referred to as bibliotherapy. Such programs can encourage interpersonal skills and social engagement in incarcerated individuals.

Degree-granting education programs are another form of educational opportunity available in correctional facilities. These programs are often affiliated with accredited colleges and universities, many of which are listed in the National Directory of Higher Education in Prison Programs. These institutions aim to provide incarcerated students with an education comparable in quality to that offered to their on-campus counterparts. Despite evidence associating participation in correctional education with reduced recidivism, access to postsecondary education in US prisons has faced financial and institutional barriers.

== Mental disorders ==
Psychopaths may have a markedly distorted sense of the potential consequences of their actions, not only for others, but also for themselves. They do not, for example, deeply recognize the risk of being caught, disbelieved, or injured as a result of their behavior. However, numerous studies and recent large-scale meta-analyses cast serious doubt on claims made about the ability of psychopathy ratings to predict who will offend or respond to treatment.

In 2002, Carmel stated that the term recidivism is often used in the psychiatric and mental health literature to mean rehospitalization, which is problematic because the concept of recidivism generally refers to criminal reoffending. Carmel reviewed the medical literature for articles with recidivism (versus terms like rehospitalization) in the title and found that articles in the psychiatric literature were more likely to use the term recidivism with its criminological connotation than articles in the rest of medicine, which avoided the term. Carmel suggested that "as a means of decreasing stigmatization of psychiatric patients, we should avoid the word 'recidivism' when what we mean is 'rehospitalization'". A 2016 follow-up by Peirson argued that "public policy makers and leaders should be careful to not misuse the word and unwittingly stigmatize persons with mental illness and substance use disorders".

== Law and economics ==
The law and economics literature offers various justifications for imposing different sanctions on offenders based on their prior convictions. In particular, Rubinstein, as well as Polinsky and Rubinfeld, have argued that a record of prior offenses provides information about an offender's characteristics (e.g., a higher-than-average propensity to commit crimes). However, Shavell has pointed out that making sanctions based on offense history may be advantageous even when there are no characteristics to be identified. He argues that when "detection of a violation implies not only an immediate sanction, but also a higher sanction for a future violation, an individual will be deterred more from committing a violation presently". Müller and Schmitz have shown that further increasing deterrence for repeat offenders may be optimal.

Economists use the term recidivism to refer to the behaviour of states that repeatedly participate in International Monetary Fund (IMF) lending arrangements, such as Stand-By Arrangements. For example, South Korea, Zaire, Liberia, and Panama each spent well over 12 years under consecutive IMF agreements.

== Policies to reduce recidivism ==
Proposed approaches to reduce recidivism include:

- Increasing the presence and quality of pre-release services within incarceration facilities that address factors associated with criminality: addiction treatment and treatment of mental disorders, education programs/vocational training and prison contemplative programs. The current criminal justice system in some countries focuses on the front end (arrest and incarceration), and largely ignores the tail end (and preparation for the tail end), which includes rehabilitation and re-entry into the community. In most correctional facilities, if planning for re-entry takes place at all, it only begins a few weeks or months before the release of an inmate. "This process is often referred to as release planning or transition planning and its parameters may be largely limited to helping a person identify a place to stay upon release and, possibly, a source of income."
- Increasing the presence and quality of community-based organizations that provide post-release services.
- Increasing sentencing for repeat offenders to increase deterrence.
- Imprisonment prevents recidivism during the time in prison through incapacitation.

== By country ==
=== Norway ===
Norway has one of the lowest reimprisonment rates within 2 years in the world at 20% in 2010, 24% in 2014, 23% in 2015, 22% in 2016, 19% in 2017, 18% in 2018, and 20% in 2024.

In 2023, the recidivism in Norway was 25% after 5 years and still ranked as one of the lowest recidivism rates in the world. Prisons in Norway and the Norwegian criminal justice system focus on restorative justice and rehabilitating prisoners rather than punishment. As of 2026, Norway has ranked second globally in the World Justice Project's Rule of Law Index every year since 2015.

=== United States ===
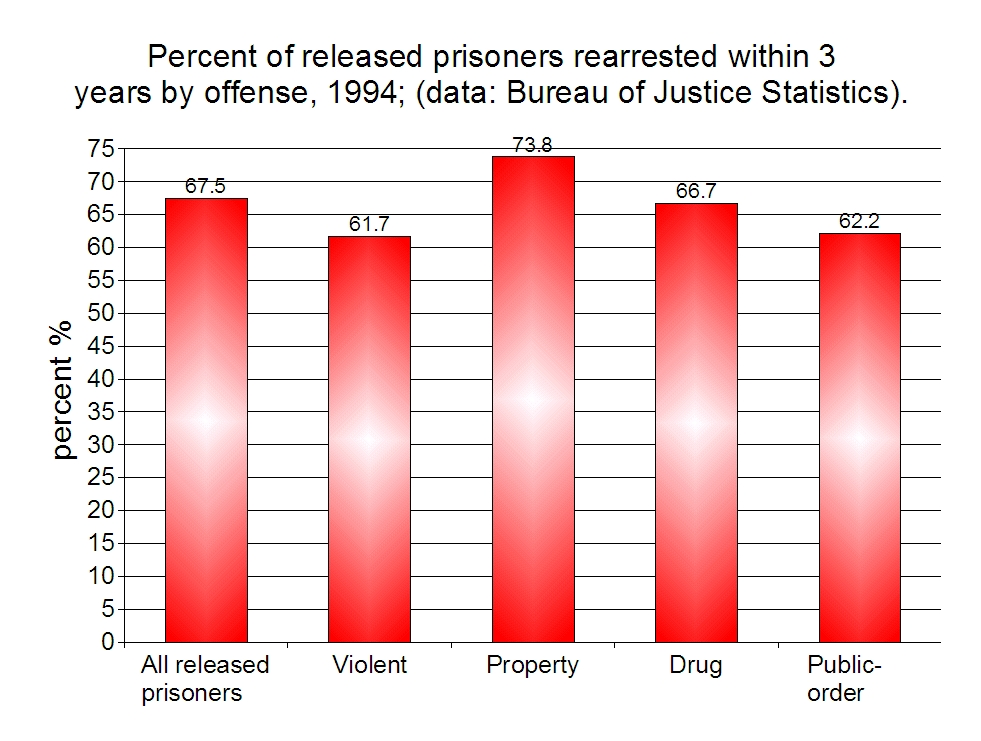
According to the latest study by the US Department of Justice, recidivism measures require three characteristics: 1. a starting event, such as a release from prison2. a measure of failure following the starting event, such as a subsequent arrest, conviction, or return to prison3. an observation or follow-up period that generally extends from the date of the starting event to a predefined end date as in 6 months, 1 year, 3 years, 5 years, or 9 years). The latest Government study of recidivism reported that 83% of state prisoners were arrested at some point in the 9 years following their release. A large majority of those were arrested within the first 3 years, and more than 50% get rearrested within the first year. However, the longer the time period, the higher the reported recidivism rate, but the lower the actual threat to public safety.

According to an April 2011 report by the Pew Center on the United States, 43.3% of prisoners released in 2004 were reincarcerated within 3 years.

According to the National Institute of Justice, almost 44% of the recently released return before the end of their first year out. About 68% of 405,000 prisoners released in 30 states in 2005 were arrested for a new crime within three years of their release from prison, 77% were arrested within five years, and by year nine that number reaches 83%.

Beginning in the 1990s, the United States incarceration rate increased dramatically, filling prisons to capacity in bad conditions for inmates. Crime continues inside many prison walls. Gangs exist on the inside, often with tactical decisions made by imprisoned leaders.

While the US justice system has traditionally focused its efforts at the front end of the system by arresting criminals, it has not exerted an equal effort at the tail end of the system: decreasing the likelihood of reoffending among formerly incarcerated persons. This is a significant issue because 95% of prisoners will be released back into the community at some point.

A cost study performed by the Vera Institute of Justice, a non-profit committed to decarceration in the United States, found that the average per-inmate cost of incarceration among the 40 states surveyed was $31,286 per year.

According to a national study published in 2003 by The Urban Institute, almost 7 out of 10 released males will be rearrested and half will be back in prison within three years. The study attributes this to personal and situational characteristics, including the individual's social environment of peers, family, community, and state-level policies.

There are many other factors in recidivism, such as the individual's circumstances before incarceration, events during their incarceration, and the period after they are released from prison, both immediate and long term.

One of the main reasons why they become imprisoned again is because it is difficult for the individual to fit back in with 'normal' life. They have to reestablish ties with their family, return to high-risk places, and secure formal identification; they often have a poor work history and now have a criminal record. Many prisoners report being anxious about their release — they are excited about how their life will be different "this time", which is not always the case.

==== Drug-related crime ====
Of US federal inmates in 2010, about half (51%) were serving time for drug offenses.

It is estimated that three quarters of those returning to prison have a history of substance abuse. Over 70% of mentally ill prisoners in the United States also have a substance use disorder. Nevertheless, only 7—17% of prisoners who meet DSM criteria for a substance use disorder receive treatment.

Persons who are incarcerated or otherwise have compulsory involvement with the criminal justice system show rates of substance abuse and dependence four times higher than those of the general population, yet fewer than 20% of federal and state prisoners who meet the required diagnostic criteria receive treatment.

Studies assessing the effectiveness of alcohol/drug treatment have shown that inmates who participate in residential treatment programs while incarcerated have 9—18% lower recidivism rates and 15—35% lower drug relapse rates than their counterparts who receive no treatment in prison. Inmates who receive aftercare (treatment continuation upon release) demonstrate an even greater reduction in recidivism rate.

==== Recidivism rates ====
The United States Department of Justice tracked the rearrest, reconviction, and reincarceration of former inmates for three years after their release from prisons in 15 states in 1994. Key findings include:

- Released prisoners with the highest rearrest rates were robbers (70.2%), burglars (74.0%), larcenists (74.6%), motor vehicle thieves (78.8%), those in prison for possessing or selling stolen property (77.4%) and those in prison for possessing, using or selling illegal weapons (70.2%).
- Within 3 years, 2.5% of released rapists were arrested for another rape, and 1.2% of those who had served time for homicide were arrested for another homicide. These are the lowest rates of rearrest for the same category of crime.
- The 272,111 offenders discharged in 1994 had accumulated 4.1 million arrest charges before their most recent imprisonment and another 744,000 charges within 3 years of release.

The Prison Policy Initiative analyzed the recidivism rates associated with various initial offenses and found that statistically, "people convicted of any violent offense are less likely to be rearrested in the years after release than those convicted of property, drug, or public order offenses."

The ability of former criminals to achieve social mobility appears to narrow as criminal records become electronically stored and accessible.

An accused individual's background and previous convictions are called antecedentss. In the United Kingdom, previous convictions are colloquially referred to as previous or form, while priors is used in the United States and Australia.

There are organizations that assist the re-integration of ex-detainees into society by helping them obtain work, teaching them various societal skills, and by providing all-around support.

In an effort to be more fair and to avoid adding to already high imprisonment rates in the US, courts across America have started using quantitative risk assessment software when trying to make decisions about releasing people on bail and sentencing, which are based on their history and other attributes. One study analyzed recidivism risk scores calculated by one of the most commonly used tools, the Northpointe COMPAS system, and looked at outcomes over two years. It found that only 61% of those deemed high risk actually committed additional crimes during that period and that African-American defendants were far more likely to be given high scores than White defendants.

The proposed Terrorist Release Announcements to Counter Extremist Recidivism (TRACER) Act of 2017 sought to facilitate information sharing between federal authorities and local law enforcement agencies concerning the release of certain terrorism offenders. Nevertheless, rates of reoffending for political crimes are much lower than for non-political crimes.

==== African Americans and recidivism ====
With regard to the United States incarceration rate, African Americans represent only about 13% of the United States population, yet account for approximately half the prison population as well as ex-offenders once released from prison. As compared to White Americans, the rate of incarceration for African Americans is 6.4 times higher for violent offenses, 4.4 times higher for property offenses and 9.4 times higher for drug offenses.

African Americans comprise a majority of the prison reentry population, yet few studies have been aimed at studying recidivism among this population. Recidivism is highest amongst those under the age of 18 who are male and African American.

The sheer number of ex-inmates exiting prison into the community is significant; however, chances of recidivism are low for those who avoid contact with the law for at least three years after release. The communities ex-inmates are released into play a part in their likelihood to reoffend; release of African-American ex-inmates into communities with higher levels of racial inequality (i.e., communities where poverty and joblessness affect members of one ethnicity more so than others) has been shown to be correlated with higher rates of recidivism, possibly due to the ex-inmates being "isolated from employers, health care services, and other institutions that can facilitate a law-abiding reentry into society".

===== Reducing recidivism among African Americans =====
A cultural re-grounding of African Americans is important to improve self-esteem and help develop a sense of community. Culturally specific programs and services that focus on characteristics that include the target population's values, beliefs, and styles of problem-solving may be beneficial in reducing recidivism among African-American inmates; programs involving social skills training and social problem-solving could also be effective.

For example, research shows that treatment effectiveness should include cognitive-behavioral and social learning techniques of modeling, role playing, reinforcement, extinction, resource provision, concrete verbal suggestions (symbolic modeling, giving reasons, prompting) and cognitive restructuring; the effectiveness of the intervention incorporates a relapse prevention element. Relapse prevention is a cognitive-behavioral approach to self-management that focuses on teaching alternate responses to high-risk situations. Research also shows that restorative justice approaches to rehabilitation and reentry coupled with the therapeutic benefits of working with plants, say through urban agriculture, lead to psychosocial healing and reintegration into one's former community.

Several theories suggest that access to low-skill employment among parolees is likely to have favorable outcomes, at least in the short term, by strengthening internal and external social controls that constrain behavior toward legal employment. Any legal employment upon release from prison may help to tip the balance of economic choice toward not needing to engage in criminal activity. Employment as a turning point enhances attachment and commitment to mainstream individuals and pursuits. From that perspective, ex-inmates are constrained from criminal acts because they are more likely to weigh the risk of severing social ties prior to engaging in illegal behavior and opt to refuse to engage in criminal activity.

In 2015, reforms to reduce recidivism rates among low-income minority communities were announced as part of a bipartisan effort headed by Koch family foundations and the ACLU. The reforms enjoyed major support across political ideologies, including praise from Barack Obama who noted that cooperation across political divisions could help reform the US criminal justice system.

There is greater indication that education in prison helps prevent reincarceration.

== Studies ==
There have been hundreds of studies on the relationship between correctional interventions and recidivism. These studies show that a reliance on only supervision and punitive sanctions may increase the likelihood of someone reoffending, while well-implemented prison and reentry programs can substantially reduce recidivism. Counties, states, and the federal government will often commission studies on trends in recidivism, in addition to research on the impacts of their programming.

=== Minnesota ===
The Minnesota Department of Corrections conducted a study on criminals who are in prison to see if rehabilitation during incarceration correlates with recidivism or saved the state money. They used Minnesota's Challenge Incarceration Program (CIP) which consisted of three phases. The first was a six-month institutional phase followed by two aftercare phases, each lasting at least six months, for a total of about eighteen months. The first phase was the "boot camp" phase. Here, inmates had daily schedules sixteen hours long where they participated in activities and showed discipline. Some activities in phase one included physical training, manual labor, skills training, drug therapy, and transition planning. The second and third phases were called "community phases". In phase two, the participants are on intensive supervised release (ISR). ISR includes being in contact with a supervisor on a daily basis, being a full-time employee, keeping curfew, passing random drug and alcohol tests, and carrying out community service while continuing to participate completely in the program. The final phase is phase three. During this phase, the individual is still on ISR and has to remain in the community while maintaining a full-time job. They have to continue with community service and their participation in the program. Once phase three is complete, participants are deemed to have 'graduated' CIP. They are then put on supervision until the end of their sentence. Inmates who drop out or fail to complete the program are sent back to prison to serve the rest of their sentence. Information was gathered through a quasi-experimental design. This compared the recidivism rates of the CIP participants with a control group. The findings of the study have shown that the CIP program did not significantly reduce the chances of recidivism. However, CIP did increase the amount of time before rearrest. Moreover, CIP early release graduates lower the costs to the state by millions every year.

=== Kentucky ===
A study was done by Robert Stanz in Jefferson County, Kentucky, which discussed an alternative to jail time. The alternative was home incarceration, in which the defendant would complete his or her time at home instead of in jail. According to the study: "Results show that the majority of offenders do successfully complete the program, but that a majority are also rearrested within 5 years of completion." In doing this, they added to the rate of recidivism. In doing a study on the results of this program, Stanz considered age, race, neighborhood, and several other aspects. Most of the defendants who fell under the recidivism category included those who were younger, those who were sentenced for multiple charges, those accruing fewer technical violations, males, and those of African-American descent. In contrast, a study published by the African Journal of Criminology and Justice Studies in 2005 used data from the Louisiana Department of Public Safety and Corrections to examine 2,810 juvenile offenders who were released in the 1999/2000 fiscal year.

The study built a socio-demographic of the offenders who were returned to the correctional system within a year of release. There was no significant difference between black offenders and white offenders. The study concluded that race does not play an important role in juvenile recidivism. The findings ran counter to conventional beliefs on the subject, which may not have controlled for other variables.

=== Methadone maintenance therapy (MMT) ===
A study was conducted regarding the recidivism rate of inmates receiving MMT (Methadone Maintenance Therapy). This therapy is intended to wean heroin users from the drug by administering small doses of methadone, thereby avoiding withdrawal symptoms. 589 inmates who took part in MMT programs between 22 November 2005 and 31 October 2006 were observed after their release. Among these former inmates, "there was no statistically significant effect of receiving methadone in the jail or dosage on subsequent recidivism risks".

=== United States, nationwide ===
Male prisoners are exposed and subject to sexual and physical violence in prisons. When these events occur, the victim usually suffers emotionally and physically. Studies suggest that this leads the inmate to accept these types of behaviors and value their lives and the lives of others less when they are released. These dehumanizing acts, combined with learned violent behavior, are implicated in higher recidivism rates. Two studies were conducted in an attempt to provide a 'national' recidivism rate for the US. One was carried out in 1983, which included 108,580 state prisoners from 11 different states. The other study was carried out in 1994 on 272,111 prisoners from 15 states. The two studies represent two-thirds of the overall prisoners released in their corresponding years. An image developed by Matt Kelley indicates the percent of parolees returning to prison in each state in 2006. According to this image, in 2006, there was more recidivism in the southern states, particularly in the Midwestern region. However, for the majority, the data is spread out throughout the regions.

=== Rikers Island, New York, New York ===
The recidivism rate in the New York City jail system is as high as 65%. The jail at Rikers Island, in New York, is making efforts to reduce this statistic by teaching horticulture to its inmates. It is shown that the inmates that go through this type of rehabilitation have significantly lower rates of recidivism.

=== Arizona and Nevada ===
A study by the University of Nevada, Reno on recidivism rates across the United States showed that, at only 24.6%, Arizona has the lowest rate of recidivism among offenders compared to all other US states. Nevada has one of the lowest rates of recidivism among offenders at only 29.2%.

=== California ===
The recidivism rate in California as of 2008–2009 is 61%. Recidivism has reduced slightly in California from the years of 2002 to 2009 by 5.2%. However, California still has one of the highest recidivism rates in the nation. This high recidivism rate contributes greatly to the overcrowding of jails and prisons in California.

=== Connecticut ===
A recidivism study conducted in Connecticut in 2022 followed 5,809 sentenced individuals for a three-year period post-pandemic. Results from this study cohort found that 50% of offenders returned to the Department of Corrections within 36 months. 51% of inmates that were discharged with Risk Reduction Earned Credits returned to prison within those three years.

=== Florida ===
In 2001, the Florida Department of Corrections created a graph showing the general recidivism rate of all offenders released from prison from July 1993 until six and a half years later. This graph shows that recidivism is much more likely within the first six months after they are released. The longer the offenders stayed out of prison, the less likely they were to return.

== See also ==
- Addiction
- Bastøy Prison
- Crime statistics
- Habitual offender
- Incapacitation (penology)
- Incarceration
- Positive criminology
- Serial killer
- Serial offender hunting patterns
