= Legalized abortion and crime effect =

Controversial hypothesis

A theory regarding the effect of legalized abortion on crime (often referred to as the Donohue–Levitt hypothesis) is a controversial hypothesis about the reduction in crime in the decades following the legalization of abortion. Proponents argue that the availability of abortion resulted in fewer births of children at the highest risk of committing crime. The earliest research suggesting such an effect was a 1966 study in Sweden. In 2001, Steven Levitt of the University of Chicago and John Donohue of Yale University, citing their research and earlier studies, argued that children who are unwanted or whose parents cannot support them are likelier to become criminals. This idea was further popularized by its inclusion in the book Freakonomics, which Levitt co-wrote.

Critics have argued that Donohue and Levitt's methodologies are flawed and that no statistically significant relationship between abortion and later crime rates can be proven. Criticisms include the assumption in the Donohue–Levitt study that abortion rates increased substantially since the 1973 Supreme Court case Roe v. Wade; critics use census data to show that the changes in the overall abortion rate could not account for the decrease in crime claimed by the study's methodology (legal abortions had been permitted under limited circumstances in many states prior). Other critics state that the correlations between births and crime found by Donohue–Levitt do not adequately account for confounding factors such as reduced drug use, changes in demographics and population densities, or other contemporary cultural changes.

Part of the problem is the long and uncertain time lag between cause and effect. If increased abortion rates reduce crime among the cohort of children born during a particular year, the effect would only become apparent ten to twenty years later. To isolate the effect of abortion on crime, it is necessary to control for other factors that affect birth cohorts (e.g., relative cohort size or the prevalence of crime during childhood) and those that have immediate effects in later years (e.g., wage or incarceration rates).

== 1972 Rockefeller Commission 12.16 ==
The 1972 Rockefeller Commission on "Population and the American Future" cites a 1966 study which found that children born to women who had been denied an abortion "turned out to have been registered more often with psychiatric services, engaged in more antisocial and criminal behavior, and have been more dependent on public assistance." In particular, the study looked at the children of 188 women who were denied abortions from 1939 to 1941 at the hospital in Gothenburg, Sweden. They compared these unwanted children to another group – the next child born after each of the unwanted children at the hospital. The unwanted children were more likely to grow up in adverse conditions, such as having divorced parents or being raised in foster homes and were more likely to become delinquents and engaged in crime.

== 2001 Donohue and Levitt study ==
Steven Levitt of the University of Chicago and John Donohue of Yale University revived discussion of this claim with their 2001 paper "The Impact of Legalized Abortion on Crime". Donohue and Levitt point to the fact that males aged 18 to 24 are most likely to commit crimes. Data indicates that crime in the United States started to decline in 1992. Donohue and Levitt suggest that the absence of unwanted children, following legalization in 1973, led to a reduction in crime 18 years later, starting in 1992 and dropping sharply in 1995. These would have been the peak crime-committing years of the unborn children.

According to Donohue and Levitt, states that had legalized abortion before Roe v. Wade (Alaska, California, Hawaii, New York, Oregon, and Washington), also had earlier reductions in crime. Further, states with a high abortion rate experienced a greater reduction in crime, when corrected for factors like average income. Finally, studies in Canada and Australia claim to have established a correlation between legalized abortion and overall crime reduction.

=== Initial criticism ===
The study was criticized by various authors, including John Lott and John Whitley, who argued that Donohue and Levitt assume that states which completely legalized abortion had higher abortion rates than states where abortion was only legal under certain conditions (many states allowed abortion only under certain conditions prior to Roe) but that CDC statistics do not substantiate this claim. In addition, if abortion rates cause crime rates to fall, crime rates should start to fall among the youngest people first and then gradually be seen lowering the crime rate for older and older people. In fact, they argue, the murder rates first start to fall among the oldest criminals and then the next oldest criminals and so on until it last falls among the youngest individuals. Lott and Whitley argue that if Donohue and Levitt are right that 80 percent of the drop in murder rates during the 1990s is due solely to the legalization of abortion, their results should be seen in some graphs without anything being controlled for, but the opposite is true. In addition, Lott and Whitley pointed out that using arrest rate data as a proxy for crime rates is flawed because arrest for murder can take place many months or even years after the crime occurred. Lott and Whitley claim that using the Supplemental Homicide Report, which links murder data for when the crime occurred with later arrest rate data, reverses Donohue and Levitt's regression results. A 2004 study by Ted Joyce concluded that the negative association between legalized abortion and crime rates reported in Donohue and Levitt's study was actually due to unmeasured period effects from, among other factors, changes in crack cocaine use. In 2009, Joyce reported similar, negative results after analyzing age-specific homicide and murder arrest rates in relation to the legalization of abortion across U.S. states and cohorts.

In 2005 Levitt posted a rebuttal to these criticisms on the Freakonomics weblog, in which he re-ran his numbers to address the shortcomings and variables missing from the original study. The new results are nearly identical to those of the original study. Levitt posits that any reasonable use of the data available reinforces the results of the original 2001 paper. A 2004 study by Donohue and Levitt addressed Joyce's criticisms, showing that a negative correlation still exists if the range of years examined were extended beyond those analyzed by Joyce, and the effects of the crack epidemic were adequately controlled.

=== 2005 criticism by Foote and Goetz ===
Later in 2005, Christopher Foote and Christopher Goetz claimed that a computer error in Levitt and Donohue's statistical analysis led to an artificially inflated relationship between legalized abortion and crime reduction. Once other crime-associated factors were properly controlled for, they claimed that the effect of abortion on arrests was reduced by about half. Foote and Goetz also criticize Levitt and Donohue's use of arrest totals rather than arrests per capita, which takes population size into account. Using Census Bureau population estimates, Foote and Goetz repeated the analysis using arrest rates in place of simple arrest totals, and found that the effect of abortion disappeared entirely.

Donohue and Levitt subsequently published a response to the Foote and Goetz paper. They acknowledged the mistake, but showed that with different methodology, the effect of legalized abortion on crime rates still existed. Foote and Goetz, however, soon produced a rebuttal showing that even after analyzing the data using the methods that Levitt and Donohue recommend, the data does not show a positive correlation between abortion rates and crime rates. They conceded that this does not necessarily disprove Levitt's thesis, however, and emphasized that with data this messy and incomplete, it may not even be possible to prove or disprove Donohue and Levitt's conclusion.

=== 2007 Reyes leaded gasoline theory ===
A 2007 study by Jessica Reyes at Amherst College stated:

This implies that, between 1992 and 2002, the phase-out of lead from gasoline was responsible for approximately a 56% decline in violent crime. Sensitivity testing confirms the strength of these results. Results for murder are not robust if New York and the District of Columbia are included, but suggest a substantial elasticity as well. No significant effects are found for property crime. The effect of legalized abortion reported by Donohue and Levitt (2001) is largely unaffected, so that abortion accounts for a 29% decline in violent crime (elasticity 0.23), and similar declines in murder and property crime. Overall, the phase-out of lead and the legalization of abortion appear to have been responsible for significant reductions in violent crime rates.

=== Later studies ===
A 2007 study by Leo H. Kahane, David Paton, Rob Simmons found no clear, consistent relationship between abortion and crime in England and Wales.

A 2014 study by Paolo Buonanno, Francesco Drago, Roberto Galbiati, and Giulio Zanella studied seven European nations, finding no evidence for the Donohue-Levitt hypothesis. However a 2014 study by Abel Francois analyzed data from 16 countries in western Europe for 1990-2007, finding that abortion caused a significant decrease in crime rates.

A 2017 study by Gary L. Shoesmith concluded that "if there is a significant link between crime and abortion, it is due to varying concentrations of teenage abortions across states, not unwantedness." In other words, legalized abortion reduced crime in the 1990s as the Donohue-Levitt hypothesis indicated, but purely because it reduced the number of teenage mothers, not some broader effect of reducing all unwanted pregnancies.

In 2019 Donohue and Levitt published an updated review of the debate over their original study, concluding that its predictions held up strongly. "We estimate that crime fell roughly 20% between 1997 and 2014 due to legalized abortion. The cumulative impact of legalized abortion on crime is roughly 45%, accounting for a very substantial portion of the roughly 50–55% overall decline from the peak of crime in the early 1990s." Levitt discussed this paper and the background and history of the original paper (including its criticisms) in an episode of the Freakonomics podcast, with Reyes saying that, from her perspective "both stories are true".

== See also ==
- Lead–crime hypothesis
- Freakonomics by Levitt and Stephen J. Dubner; Chapter 4 discusses this effect.
- Freedomnomics by John R. Lott Jr.; Chapter 4 discusses this effect.
- Statistical correlations of criminal behaviour
- Roe effect
- Title X
- Unintended pregnancy
