= Lead–crime hypothesis =

Hypothesized effect of blood lead levels on criminal behavior

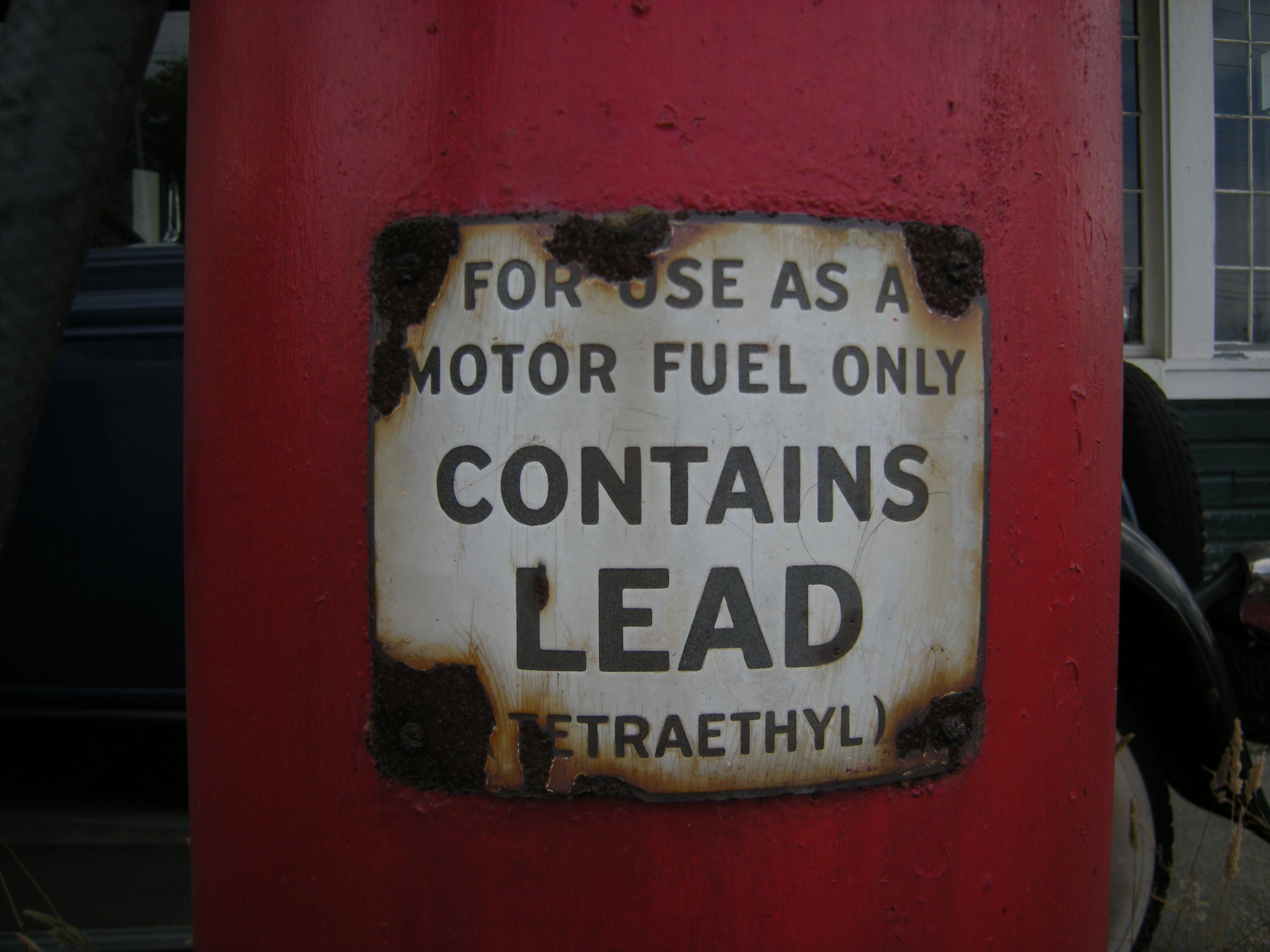
This warning on an old Lynnwood, Washington, fuel pump notes how it used to dispense gasoline with tetraethyllead additives.

The lead–crime hypothesis proposes that the sharp decline in crime rates in the industrialised world in the 1990s and beyond, after decades of increased crime, can be attributed to the reduction of lead poisoning. Lead is widely understood to be toxic to multiple organs of the human body, particularly the human brain. Concerns about even low levels of exposure began in the 1970s; in the decades since, scientists have concluded that no safe threshold for lead exposure exists. The major source of lead exposure during the 20th century was leaded gasoline. The hypothesis argues that the removal of lead additives from motor fuel, and the consequent decline in children's lead exposure, explains the fall in crime rates in the United States beginning in the 1990s. This hypothesis also offers an explanation of the rise in crime in the preceding decades as the result of increased lead exposure throughout the mid-20th century. Other explanations have been proposed, including situational crime prevention and interactions between many other factors with complex, multifactorial causation.

The lead–crime hypothesis is not mutually exclusive with other explanations of the drop in U.S. crime rates, which includes analysis of the hypothesized legalized abortion and crime effect. The difficulty in measuring the effect of lead exposure on crime rates is in separating the effect from other indicators of poverty such as poorer schools, nutrition, and medical care, exposure to other pollutants, and other variables that may lead to crime.

== Background and research ==
=== Usage of lead in modern history ===
Lead, a naturally occurring metal of bluish-grey color, has been used for many purposes in the history of human civilization. Advantages include being somewhat soft and pliable as well as resistant to corrosion compared to other metals. The widespread substance is also able to function as a shield against various forms of radiation.

Expanded scientific investigation into organolead chemistry and the varied ways in which human biology changes due to lead exposure took place throughout the 20th century. Although it has continued to be in wide use even into the 21st century, greater understanding of blood lead levels (BLLs) and other factors have meant that a new scientific consensus has emerged. No 'safe' level of lead in the human bloodstream exists as such; any amount can contribute to neurological problems and other health issues.

Medical analyses of the role of lead exposure in the brain note increases in impulsive actions and social aggression as well as the possibility of developing attention deficit hyperactivity disorder (ADHD). Those conditions likely influence personality traits and behavioral choices, with examples including having poor job performance, beginning a pattern of substance abuse, and undergoing teenage pregnancy. Evidence that lead exposure contributes to lower intelligence quotient (IQ) scores goes back to a seminal 1979 study in Nature, with later analysis finding the link particularly robust.

The international process of trying to lower the prevalence of lead has been largely spearheaded by the Partnership for Clean Fuels and Vehicles (PCFV). The non-governmental organization partners with major oil companies, various governmental departments, multiple civil society groups, and other such institutions worldwide. Efforts to phase-out lead in transport fuel achieved major gains in over seventy-five nations. In discussions at the 2002 'Earth Summit', institutions under the umbrella of the United Nations vowed to emphasize public–private partnerships (PPPs) in order to help developing and transitional countries go unleaded.

=== Correlation between lead exposure and crime ===
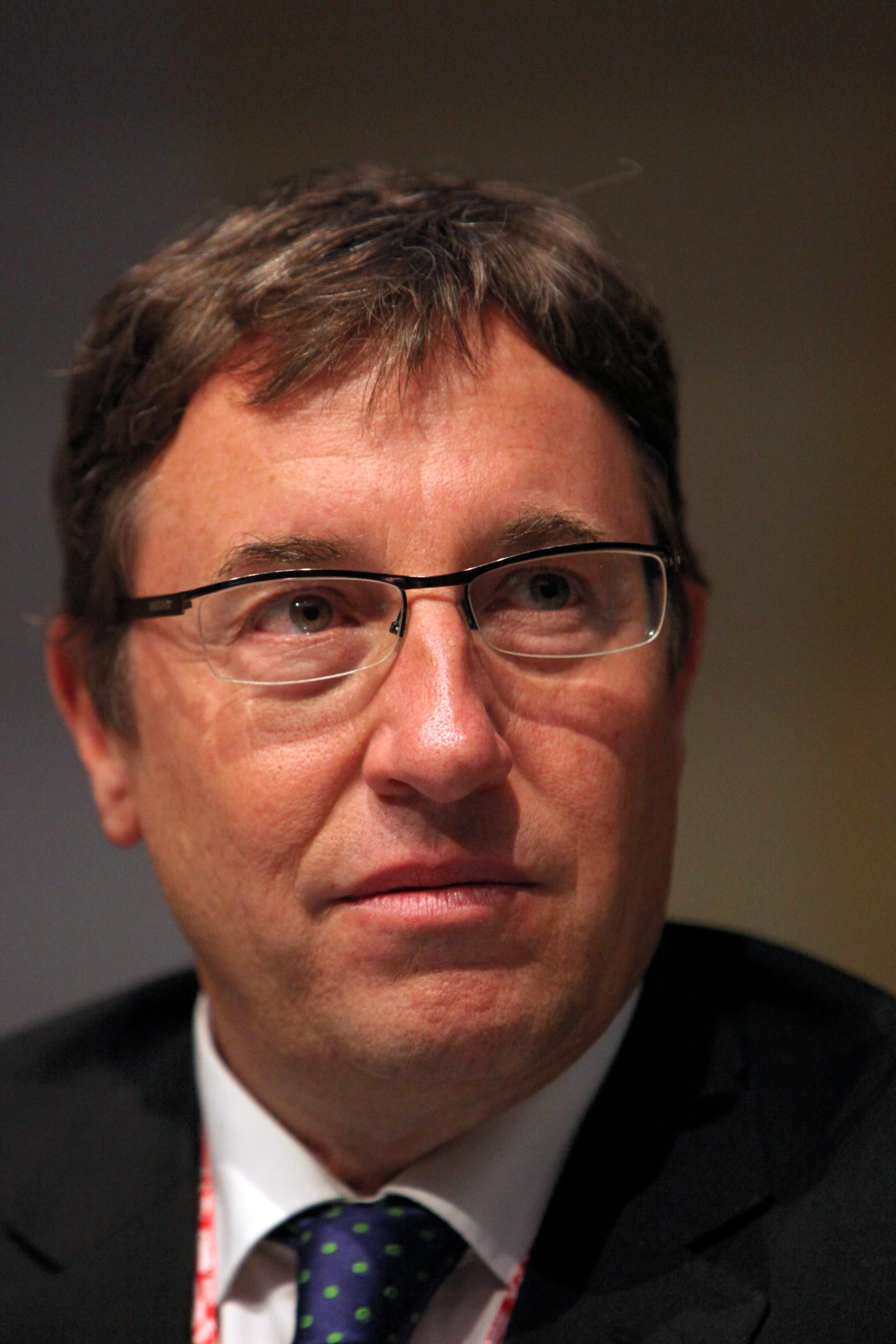
Brazilian-German economist Achim Steiner, speaking as then head of the U.N. Environment Programme, described anti-lead efforts as a key sustainable development success.

Commentators and researchers have noted that, after decades of relatively steady increases, crime rates in the United States started to sharply decline in the 1990s. The trend continued even into the new millennium. Multiple possible explanations have been suggested, with academic studies pointing to complex, multifactorial causation concurrent with various social trends.

The economists Steven D. Levitt and John J. Donohue III, of the University of Chicago and Stanford University, respectively, have argued that the decline in U.S. crime rates was the combined result of an increase in the number of police, hikes in size of the prison population, waning of the spread of crack cocaine, and the widespread legalization of abortion from the 1970s onward. Possible other factors include changes in alcohol consumption. Later studies have upheld many of these findings while disputing others.

While noting that correlation does not imply causation, the fact that in the United States anti-lead efforts took place simultaneously alongside falls in violent crime rates attracted attention from researchers. Changes were not uniform across the country, even while increasingly stringent Environmental Protection Agency rules went into force from the 1970s onward. Several areas had far greater lead exposure compared to others for years.

A 2007 report published by The B.E. Journal of Economic Analysis & Policy, authored by Jessica Wolpaw Reyes of Amherst College, found that between 1992 and 2002 the phase-out of lead from gasoline in the U.S. "was responsible for approximately a 56% decline in violent crime". While cautioning that the findings relating to "murder are not robust if New York and the District of Columbia are included," the author concluded that "[o]verall, the phase-out of lead and the legalization of abortion appear to have been responsible for significant reductions in violent crime rates." She additionally speculated that by "2020, all adults in their 20s and 30s will have grown up without any direct exposure to gasoline lead during childhood, and their crime rates could be correspondingly lower."

In 2011, a report published by the official United Nations News Centre remarked, "Ridding the world of leaded petrol [...] has resulted in $2.4 trillion in annual benefits, 1.2 million fewer premature deaths, higher overall intelligence and 58 million fewer crimes". The California State University did the specific study. Then U.N. Environment Programme (UNEP) executive director Achim Steiner argued, "Although this global effort has often flown below the radar of media and global leaders, it is clear that the elimination of leaded petrol is an immense achievement on par with the global elimination of major deadly diseases."

In a 2013 article, Mother Jones ran a report by Kevin Drum arguing:

Needless to say, not every child exposed to lead is destined for a life of crime. Everyone over the age of 40 was probably exposed to too much lead during childhood, and most of us suffered nothing more than a few points of IQ loss. But there were plenty of kids already on the margin, and millions of those kids were pushed over the edge from being merely slow or disruptive to becoming part of a nationwide epidemic of violent crime.

Drum writes:

We now have studies at the international level, the national level, the state level, the city level, and even the individual level. Groups of children have been followed from the womb to adulthood, and higher childhood blood lead levels are consistently associated with higher adult arrest rates for violent crimes. All of these studies tell the same story: Gasoline lead is responsible for a good share of the rise and fall of violent crime over the past half century.

According to Reyes, "Childhood lead exposure increases the likelihood of behavioral and cognitive traits such as impulsivity, aggressivity, and low IQ that are strongly associated with criminal behavior".

A May 2017 study by Anna Aizer and Janet Currie found that lead exposure in childhood substantially increased school suspensions and juvenile detention among boys in Rhode Island, suggesting that the phasing out of leaded gasoline may explain a significant part of the decline in crime in the United States beginning in the 1990s.

==== Systematic reviews / meta-analysis ====
The first meta-analysis of the lead-crime hypothesis was published in 2022. "The Lead-Crime Hypothesis: A Meta-Analysis", authored by Anthony Higney, Nick Hanley, and Mirko Moro, consolidates findings of 24 studies on the subject. It found that there is substantial evidence linking lead exposure to a heightened risk of criminal behavior, particularly violent crimes. This aligns with earlier research suggesting lead exposure may foster impulsive and aggressive tendencies, potential precursors to violent offenses. The study concluded that, while a correlation between declining lead pollution and declining criminality is supported by research, it is likely not a significant factor in reduced crime rates, and that the link is generally overstated in lead-crime literature.

The study's implications point towards the potential benefits of reducing lead exposure to decrease crime rates. Such reductions could be achieved through initiatives like removing lead from products like gasoline and paint, water pipes and enhancing lead abatement measures in schools and residences.

== See also ==
- Brain health and pollution
- Euthenics
- Biosocial criminology
- Environmental toxicology
- Evolutionary mismatch
- Lead abatement
- Legalized abortion and crime effect
- Organolead chemistry
- Pollution control
- Societal effects of cars
- Statistical correlations of criminal behavior
