= Correlates of crime =

Things associated with unlawful behavior

The correlates of crime explore the associations of specific non-criminal factors with specific crimes.

The field of criminology studies the dynamics of crime. Most of these studies use correlational data; that is, they attempt to identify various factors are associated with specific categories of criminal behavior. Such correlational studies led to hypotheses about the causes of these crimes.

The Handbook of Crime Correlates (2009) is a systematic review of 5200 empirical studies on crime that have been published worldwide. A crime consistency score represents the strength of relationships. The scoring depends on how consistently a statistically significant relationship was identified across multiple studies. The authors claim that the review summarizes most of what is currently known about the variables associated with criminality. Writing in 2019, criminologist Greg Ridgeway argued that criminology was still trying to conclusively determine what causes crime.

Crime occurs most frequently during the second and third decades of life.

== Personal Factors ==
=== Sex ===
Males commit more crime overall and more violent crime than females. They commit more property crime except shoplifting, which is about equally distributed between the genders. Males appear to be more likely to reoffend.

=== Genetics ===
==== Serotonin ====
Lower serotonergic activity in the brain is associated with criminality. Serotonin levels can be estimated by measuring the levels of the metabolite 5-HIAA in the urine; offenders often have lower levels of 5-HIAA. An 5-HTTLPR polymorphism, which lowers serotonin levels, has been found to be associated with criminal behavior. In addition, a lower density of paroxetine binding sites, which is associated with lower levels of serotonin transmission in the brain, is associated with greater criminality.

==== Other ====
In addition, CDH13, a gene previously tied to an increased risk of substance abuse, has been tied to violent crime. Low cholesterol levels, slow heart rate, DHEA, MHPG, blood glucose, cortisol, testosterone, and blood lead levels, and the ratio of tryptophan to other amino acids in the blood, have all also been connected to criminal behavior. Physical attractiveness has been found to be negatively correlated with criminality. These tendencies are ostensibly related, as the majority of all individuals who commit severe violent crime in Finland do so under the influence of alcohol or drugs. The presence of the genetic profile is not determinative, although it increases the likelihood of delinquency in cases where other factors are present. Ferguson stated, 'a large percentage of our behaviour in terms of violence or aggression is influenced by our biology - our genes - and our brain anatomy.' Schnupp stated, 'To call these alleles "genes for violence" would therefore be a massive exaggeration. In combination with many other factors these genes may make it a little harder for you to control violent urges, but they most emphatically do not predetermine you for a life of crime.'

=== Early life ===
Associated factors include maternal smoking during pregnancy, low birth weight, perinatal trauma/birth complications, child maltreatment, low parent-child attachment, marital discord/family discord, alcoholism and drug use in the family, low parental supervision/monitoring, family size and birth order, nocturnal enuresis or bed wetting, bullying, school disciplinary problems, truancy, low grade point average, dropping out of high school and childhood lead exposure.

==== Parent–child relationships ====
Children whose parents did not want children are more likely to commit crimes. Such children are less likely to succeed in school, and are more likely to live in poverty. They tend to have lower mother‍–‍child relationship quality.

=== Adult behavior ===
Associated factors include high alcohol use, alcohol abuse and alcoholism, high illegal drug use and dependence, early age of first sexual intercourse and the number of sexual partners, social isolation, criminal peer groups and gang membership.

=== Psychological traits ===
Associated factors include childhood conduct disorder, adult antisocial personality disorder (also associated with each other), attention deficit hyperactivity disorder (ADHD), minor depression, clinical depression, depression in the family, suicidal tendencies and schizophrenia.

The American Psychological Association's 1995 report Intelligence: Knowns and Unknowns stated that the correlation between intelligence quotient (IQ) and crime was -0.2. This association is generally regarded as small and prone to disappear or be substantially reduced after controlling for the proper covariates, being much smaller than typical sociological correlates. In his book The g Factor: The Science of Mental Ability (1998), Arthur Jensen cited data which showed that IQ was generally negatively associated with crime among people of all races, peaking between 80 and 90. Learning disability is a substantial discrepancy between IQ and academic performance and is associated with crime. Slow reading development may be particularly relevant. It has also been shown, however, that the effect of IQ is heavily dependent on socioeconomic status and that it cannot be easily controlled away, with many methodological considerations being at play. Indeed, there is evidence that the small relationship is mediated by well-being, substance abuse, and other confounding factors that prohibit simple causal interpretation. A recent meta-analysis has shown that the relationship is only observed in higher risk populations such as those in poverty without direct effect, but without any causal interpretation. A nationally representative longitudinal study has shown that this relationship is entirely mediated by school performance.

Several personality traits are associated with criminality: impulsivity, psychoticism, sensation-seeking, low self control, childhood aggression, low empathy and low altruism.

== Cultural Factors ==
=== Religiosity ===
A few studies have found a negative correlation between religiosity and criminality. A 2001 meta-analysis found, "religious beliefs and behaviors exert a moderate deterrent effect on individuals' criminal behavior", but that "studies have systematically varied in their estimation of the religion-on-crime effect due to differences in both their conceptual and methodological approaches". This suggests that religiosity has been operationalized in varying ways, impacting the results of the findings. Additionally, 1995 paper stated that "[a]lthough a few researchers have found that religion's influence is noncontingent, most have found support—especially among youths—for effects that vary by denomination, type of offense, and social and/or religious context," suggesting a complex relationship between religiosity and crime. They also "found that, among our religiosity measures, participation in religious activities was a persistent and noncontingent inhibiter of adult crime" when controlling for other factors, such as social ecology and secular constraints.

An individual with high religious saliency (i.e. expressing the high importance of religion in their life) is less likely to be associated with criminal activities; similarly, an individual who regularly attends religious services or is highly involved in them tends to be less involved in criminality, with the exception of property damage. Other meta-analysis research suggests that those who subscribe to more orthodox religious beliefs are less likely to engage in criminal behavior than those who do not. A 2012 study suggested that belief in hell decreases crime rates, while belief in heaven increases them, and indicated that these correlations were stronger than other correlates like national wealth or income inequality.

A 1997 study of six public high schools found no statistically significant negative correlations between religiosity and crime, or religiosity and drug use, and the only relationship between religiosity and alcohol was statistically significant. A more recent review concludes that there are insufficient data to indicate any correlation between religiosity and crime. Furthermore, any possible correlations may not apply universally to all relatively nonreligious groups, as there is some evidence self-identified atheists have had significantly lower incarceration rates than the general public in the United States. Most studies examining correlation to date do not distinguish between different types of low religiosity.

=== Political ideology ===
A 2016 study found statistically significant evidence that political ideology is moderately correlated with involvement in non-violent crime, among white individuals and particularly among white women. It suggests that liberal self-classification can, among some groups, be positively associated with non-violent criminal behavior compared to conservative self-classification.

=== Individualism and Collectivism ===
There is research done on a large community sample of 329 Chinese, Cambodian, Laotian/Mien, and Vietnamese youths suggesting that individuals with higher tendency for individualism have higher levels of self-reported delinquency; another study suggests that individualism leads to a higher rates of non-homicide crimes. There is also another study suggesting a positive correlation between individualism, neoliberalism and crime rates.

However, when specific to homicide, it has been shown that more individualistic societies have a lower homicide rate; on the other hand, there has been research suggesting that individualism affects homicide rates indirectly through the quality of legal institutions.

A study on Japan suggests that while there have been fewer juvenile offenders in total number, the complexity and intensity of the crimes done by them have grown, and it has been suggested that the alienation and social disconnection brought by the increase of individualism might have contributed to this.

== Other Social Factors ==
=== Race, ethnicity ===
Research into the relationship between race and crime has grown rapidly in recent years.More specifically, the research delves into the potential cause and effects of racial disparities in crime. This includes but is not limited to, disadvantages and inequality (racially, socially and economically), disparities in education, employment/unemployment, poverty, social status, and social/familial structure. Also of notable interest, is the role of exposure in childhood to violent behavior, another potential cause of racial disparities in crime.

In some countries, ethnically/racially diverse geographical areas have higher crime rates compared to homogeneous areas, and in other countries, it is the other way around.

=== Immigration status ===
While some studies on immigrants found higher rates of crime, this varies with the country of origin. Immigrants from some regions show lower reported crime rates than the native-born population. Notions about the propensity for immigrants to commit crime vary among geographical regions. Likewise, the propensity for immigrants to commit more or less crime than the native-born population also varies geographically. For instance within the United States, census data shows that immigrants are less likely to be incarcerated for a crime than residents who were born within the United States. The United States census includes both legal and illegal immigrants, as it counts the total number of people residing in an area regardless of citizenship status.

=== Socioeconomic factors ===
Socioeconomic status (usually measured using the three variables income or wealth, occupational level, and years of education) correlates negatively with criminality, except for self-reported illegal drug use. Higher parental socioeconomic status probably has an inverse relationship with crime. Unstable employment and high frequency of unemployment correlate positively with criminality. Low socioeconomic status is thought to be positively correlated with higher levels of stress, and therefore the mental and psychological ill-effects of stress. Indeed, higher stress levels have been positively associated with a propensity to commit crime.

Somewhat inconsistent evidence indicates a positive relationship between low income levels, the percentage of population under the poverty line, low education levels, and high income inequality in an area with more crime in said area. A 2013 study from Sweden argued that there was little effect of neighbourhood deprivation on criminality per se and rather that the higher rates of crime were due to observed and unobserved family and individual level factors, indicating that high-risk individuals were being selected into economically deprived areas.

A World Bank study said, "Crime rates and inequality are positively correlated within countries and, particularly, between countries, and this correlation reflects causation from inequality to crime rates, even after controlling for other crime determinants."

Researchers in criminology have argued the effect of poverty upon crime is contextual:

As Levi (1997: 860) noted, macrolevel accounts 'seldom generate anything close to a causal account which makes sense of nonviolence as well as of violence'. Put another way, the vast majority of individuals who live in conditions of poverty or disadvantage do not resort to violence at any time. Hence, in order to understand the patterns of violence that actually occur, it is imperative to study the social experiences of those who engage in it (Athens 1992).

== Geographic factors ==
Associated factors include areas with population size, neighborhood quality, residential mobility, tavern and alcohol density, gambling and tourist density, proximity to the equator, temperature (weather and season). The higher crime rate in the southern US largely disappears after controlling for non-climatic factors.

== Biosocial criminology and other analysis of environmental factors ==
Biosocial criminology is an interdisciplinary field that aims to explain crime and antisocial behavior by exploring both biological factors and environmental factors. While contemporary criminology has been dominated by sociological theories, biosocial criminology also recognizes the potential contributions of fields such as genetics, neuropsychology and evolutionary psychology.

Aggressive behavior has been associated with abnormalities in three principal regulatory systems in the body:

- serotonin systems,
- catecholamine systems,
- and the hypothalamic-pituitary-adrenocortical axis.

Abnormalities in these systems also are known to be induced by stress, either severe, acute stress or chronic low-grade stress.

In environmental terms, the theory that crime rates and lead exposure are connected, with increases in the latter causing increases in the former, has attracted much scientific analysis. In 2011, a report published by the official United Nations News Centre remarked, "Ridding the world of leaded petrol, with the United Nations leading the effort in developing countries, has resulted in $2.4 trillion in annual benefits, 1.2 million fewer premature deaths, higher overall intelligence and 58 million fewer crimes". The California State University did the specific study. Then U.N. Environment Programme (UNEP) executive director Achim Steiner argued, "Although this global effort has often flown below the radar of media and global leaders, it is clear that the elimination of leaded petrol is an immense achievement on par with the global elimination of major deadly diseases."

== See also ==
- Causes of sexual violence
- Causality
- Crime statistics
- Criminology
  - Biosocial criminology
  - Environmental criminology
  - Lead and crime hypothesis
- Dark figure of crime
- Rape culture

== Sources ==
Ellis, Lee; Beaver, Kevin M.; Wright, John (1 April 2009). Handbook of Crime Correlates. Academic Press. ISBN 978-0-12-373612-3.
