= Roe effect =

Hypothesis about the effects of legalizing abortion

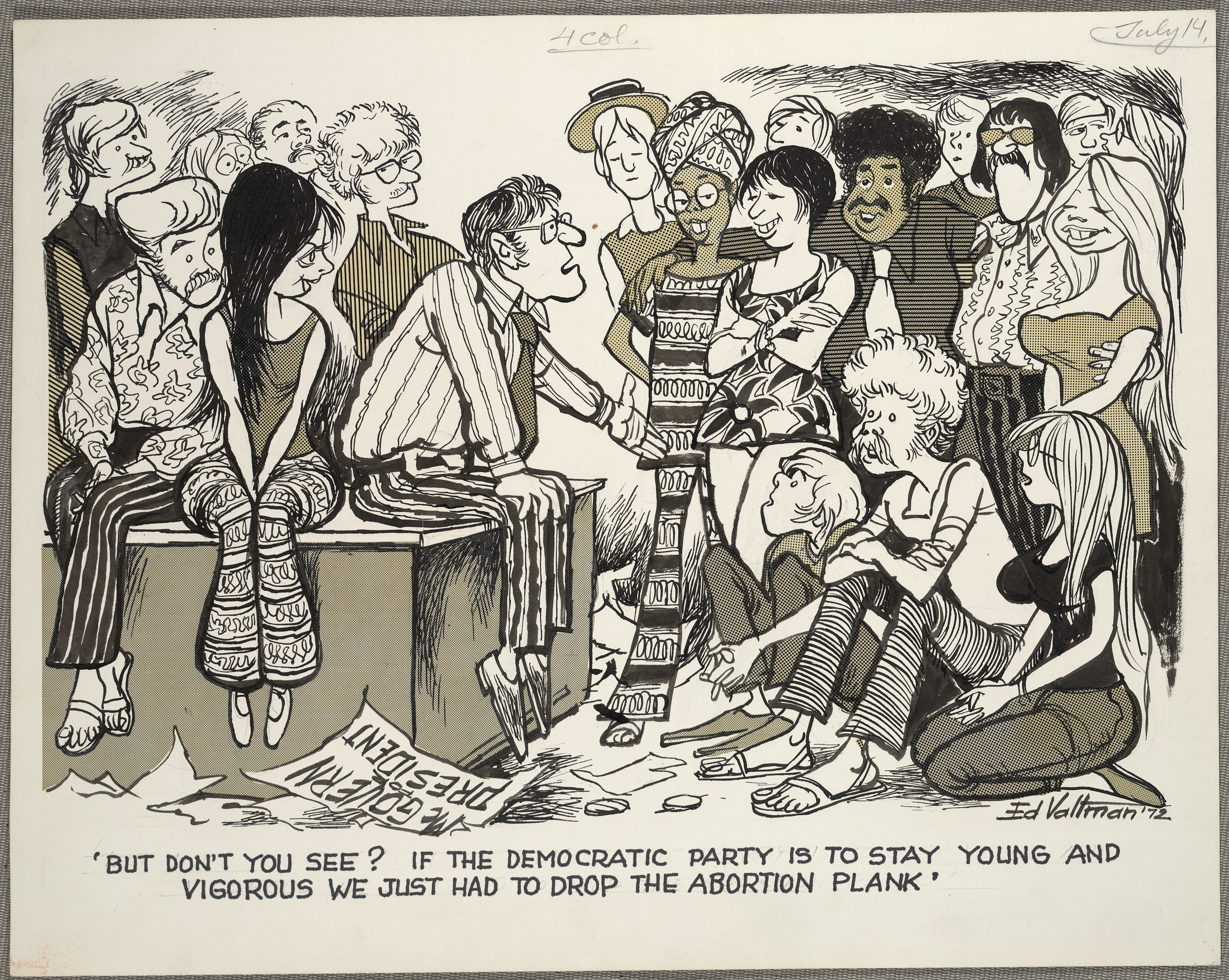
A 1972 political cartoon referencing the need for procreation and childrearing in order to sustain a political party's youth and energy.

The Roe effect is a hypothesis about the long-term effect of abortion on the political balance of the United States, which suggests that since supporters of the legalization of abortion cause the erosion of their own political base, the practice of abortion will eventually lead to the restriction or illegalization of abortion. It is named after Roe v. Wade, the U.S. Supreme Court case that effectively legalized abortion nationwide in the U.S. Its best-known proponent is James Taranto of The Wall Street Journal who coined the phrase "Roe effect" in Best of the Web Today, his OpinionJournal.com column.

Put simply, this hypothesis holds that:

- Those who favor legal abortion are much more likely to have the procedure than those who oppose it.
- Children usually follow their parents' political leanings.
- Therefore, pro-abortion rights parents will have more abortions and, hence, fewer children.
- Therefore, the pro-abortion rights population gradually shrinks in proportion to the anti-abortion population.
- Therefore, support for legal abortions will decline over time.

A similar argument suggests that political groups that oppose abortion will tend to have more supporters in the long run than those who support it. In 2005, the Wall Street Journal published a detailed explanation and statistical evidence that Taranto says supports his hypothesis.

Taranto first discussed the concept in January 2003, and named it in December 2003. He later suggested that the Roe effect serves as an explanation for the fact that the fall in teen birth rates is "greatest in liberal states, where pregnant teenagers would be more likely to [have abortions] and thus less likely to carry their babies to term."

The Journal has also published articles about this topic by Larry L. Eastland and Arthur C. Brooks. Eastland has argued that Democrats have had higher rates of abortion than Republicans following Roe, while Brooks points out liberals have a lower fertility rate than conservatives.

According to American historian Elizabeth Fox-Genovese the existence of such an effect "cannot be doubted" but "its nature, causes, and consequences may be." Fox-Genovese said that "Taranto has advanced an arresting argument that deserves more extended treatment."

Wellesley College Professor of Economics Phillip Levine, while acknowledging that Taranto's hypothesis cannot be dismissed out of hand, has said there are several flaws in Taranto's reasoning. He writes that the conditions laid out by Taranto make several incorrect assumptions, most notably that pregnancies are events that are completely out of the control of the women. He writes, "If people engage in sexual activity (or not), or choose to use birth control (or not), independent of outside influences, then [Taranto's and Eastland's] statistical statements would be valid." Levine concludes that the hypothesis passes the test of plausibility but that it "would be unwarranted to draw any definitive conclusions regarding the actual contribution of the Roe Effect in determining contemporary political outcomes."

== See also ==
- Abortion in the United States
- Legalized abortion and crime effect
- William Bennett
