= A. Mitchell Polinsky =

Alan Mitchell Polinsky
- Born: 1948 (age 77–78)
- Occupation: Lawyer

Academic background
- Education: Harvard University; MIT School of Humanities, Arts, and Social Sciences; Yale Law School

Academic work
- Discipline: Law and economics
- Institutions: Stanford Law School; Harvard Law School

Alan Mitchell Polinsky (born 1948) is the Josephine Scott Crocker Professor of Law and Economics at Stanford Law School. At Stanford, Polinsky is the founder and director of the John M. Olin Program in Law and Economics. He is also a past president of the American Law and Economics Association.

== Education ==
Polinsky received his B.A., magna cum laude and with Highest Honors in Economics, from Harvard University in 1970, where he received the Allyn A. Young Prize in Economics. He received his Ph.D. in Economics from the Massachusetts Institute of Technology in 1973 and his M.S.L. from Yale Law School in 1976.

== Career ==
Polinsky joined the faculty of Harvard University in 1973 as an assistant professor of economics. From 1975 to 1977, he was a Russell Sage Foundation Resident in Law and Social Science at Yale Law School and Harvard Law School. In 1977, he returned to Harvard as an assistant professor in economics and as an assistant professor of law and economics at Harvard Law School.

In 1979, Polinsky joined the faculty of Stanford University and Stanford Law School, where was appointed the Josephine Scott Crocker Professor of Law and Economics in 1984. In 1985, he served as a National Fellow in the Domestic Studies Program at the Hoover Institution and was a Guggenheim Fellow in 1993.

Polinsky currently serves as a researcher in the Law and Economics Program of the National Bureau of Economic Research.

Polinsky is a prolific scholar in the field of law and economics. His work has been published in leading law journals, including the Stanford Law Review, the Harvard Law Review, and the Georgetown Law Journal, and in numerous peer-reviewed journals, including the Journal of Legal Studies, the RAND Journal of Economics, and the American Economic Review.

According to a 2014 study, Polinsky is among the ten most widely cited legal scholars in law and economics.
