= American Law and Economics Review =

- Discipline: Law and economics
- Language: English
- Edited by: J.J. Prescott, Albert Choi

Publication details
- History: 1999-present
- Publisher: Oxford University Press
- Frequency: Biannually
- Impact factor: 0.923 (2020)

Standard abbreviations
- Bluebook: Am. L. & Econ. Rev.
- ISO 4: Am. Law Econ. Rev.

Indexing
- ISSN: 1465-7252 (print); 1465-7260 (web)

Links
- Journal homepage; Online access; Online archive

The American Law and Economics Review is a biannual peer-reviewed academic journal covering law and economics. It was established in 1999 and is published by Oxford University Press on behalf of the American Law and Economics Association, of which it is the official journal. The founding editors-in-chief were Richard Posner (University of Chicago Law School) and Orley Ashenfelter (Princeton University). Posner was succeeded by Steve Shavell, and Orley Ashenfelter was succeeded by John J. Donohue. The current ones are J. J. Prescott and Albert Choi. According to the Journal Citation Reports, the journal has a 2020 impact factor of 0.923.
