= George L. Priest =

American legal scholar (1947–2024)

- Born: November 24, 1947
- Died: December 17, 2024 (aged 77)

Academic background
- Education: Yale University (BA); University of Chicago (JD)

Academic work
- Discipline: Antitrust law
- Institutions: Yale University

George L. Priest (born November 24, 1947 – December 17, 2024) was an American legal scholar specializing in antitrust law. Priest taught at Yale Law School beginning in 1981, where he was the Edward J. Phelps Professor of Law and Economics and Director of the John M. Olin Center for Law, Economics, and Public Policy. Priest was a noted antitrust scholar, and was also the author of a wide number of articles and monographs on the subjects of product liability, tort law, insurance litigation, and settlement. Among his students at Yale were journalist Emily Bazelon and United States Vice President JD Vance.

== Background ==
Priest graduated from Yale University in 1969 and from the University of Chicago Law School in 1973. After graduation and prior to Yale, he worked at the University of Chicago, University at Buffalo, and UCLA. He was the father of fellow Yale Law School professor Claire Priest, Doctor of Evolutionary Biology Nicholas Priest and a son-in-law of Adolph Kiefer, a 1936 Olympics champion. He was also a member and longtime sponsor of Yale's chapter of the Federalist Society.

Priest died on December 17, 2024, after a battle with cancer.

== Works ==
- The Common Law Process and the Selection of Efficient Rules (1977)
- The Selection of Disputes for Litigation (1984)
- My Greatest Benefactions (1986)
- Satisfying the Multiple Goals of Tort Law (1988)
- Rethinking Antitrust Law in an Age of Network Industries (2007)
- Ronald Coase, Firms and Markets (2014)
- The Rise of Law and Economics: An Intellectual History (2020)
