= Steven Shavell =

Samuel R. Rosenthal Professor of Law and Economics at Harvard Law School

Academic background
- Education: MIT (Ph.D. 1973); University of Michigan

Academic work
- Discipline: Law and economics
- Institutions: Harvard Law School (1980 - present); Harvard University, Department of Economics (1974 to 1980)
- Website: Information at IDEAS / RePEc

Steven Shavell is an economist who is currently Samuel R. Rosenthal Professor of Law and Economics at Harvard Law School. Shavell is the founder and director of the School's John M. Olin Center for Law, Economics, and Business.

== Biography ==
Steven Shavell graduated from the University of Michigan in 1968. He obtained a Ph.D. in economics from MIT in 1973. Shavell is working on the economic analysis of law, including topics such as contracts, torts, property, criminal law, and legal process. He was a Guggenheim Fellow.

== Selected publications ==
- Shavell, S., 1979. Risk sharing and incentives in the principal and agent relationship. Bell Journal of Economics, 10(1), pp. 55–73.
- Shavell, S., 1980. Strict liability versus negligence. Journal of Legal Studies, 9(1), pp. 1–25.
- Shavell, S., 1984. The design of contracts and remedies for breach. Quarterly Journal of Economics, 99(1), pp. 121–148.
- Shavell, S., 1984. A model of the optimal use of liability and safety regulation. RAND Journal of Economics, 15(2), pp. 271–280.
- Shavell, S., 1987. A model of optimal incapacitation. American Economic Review, 77(2), pp. 107–110.
- Shavell, S., 1987. Economic Analysis of Accident Law. Harvard University Press.
- Shavell, S., 1991. Specific versus general enforcement of law. Journal of Political Economy, 99(5), pp. 1088–1108.
- Polinsky, A.M. and Shavell, S., 2000. The economic theory of public enforcement of law. Journal of Economic Literature, 38(1), pp. 45–76.
- Kaplow, L. and Shavell, S., 2002. Economic analysis of law. In Handbook of Public Economics (Vol. 3, pp. 1661–1784). Elsevier.
- Kaplow, L. and Shavell, S., 2007. Moral rules, the moral sentiments, and behavior: toward a theory of an optimal moral system. Journal of Political Economy, 115(3), pp. 494–514.
