= Ban the Box =

American adovacy campaign

Ban the Box is an American campaign by advocates for ex-offenders aimed at removing the check box asking applicants about their potential criminal record from hiring applications. Its purpose is to enable ex-offenders to display their qualifications in the hiring process before being asked about their criminal records. The Ban the Box campaign started in the state of Hawaii in the late 1990s and gained popularity during the Great Recession. Proponents of the campaign argue removing the need to mention criminal records in job applications may lower recidivism rates by increasing employment opportunities for ex-offenders.

== History ==
The campaign began in Hawaii in the late 1990s and has gained strength in other U.S. states following the Great Recession. Its advocates say it is necessary because a growing number of Americans have criminal records due to of tougher sentencing laws, particularly for drug crimes, and are having difficulty finding work thanks to high unemployment and a rise in background checks that followed the September 11 terror attacks on the United States. As of 2016, 25 states, including the District of Columbia, and 150 cities have in place legislation that "bans the box" for government job applications, as well as in some cases those of their private contractors. Many such ordinances exempt applications for "sensitive" positions, such as those involving work with children. Target Corporation "banned the box" in October 2013.Proponents of Ban the Box argue unemployment leads to high crime rates, and prohibiting employers from asking for ex-convicts' criminal records help lower the chances of repeat offending.

In the United Kingdom, corporate social responsibility advocacy charity Business in the Community launched a "ban the box" campaign in October 2013.

The campaign has been criticized by U.S. industry group the National Retail Federation for exposing companies, their customers and employees to potential crime, and by the New Jersey Chamber of Commerce, which says it could expose employers to lawsuits from unsuccessful applicants.

Ban the Box can put businesses in a difficult position where they can face a lawsuit for not hiring a former prisoner, but also might face a negligent hiring or respondeat superior lawsuit if the business hires an ex-prisoner who goes on to reoffend at the job. In addition, some businesses, especially smaller ones, feel that ban the box forces them to waste time and money interviewing candidates they will not hire. If a company ends up not hiring a person after doing a background check late in the process, they may have already lost qualified applicants without criminal records, who have lost interest in the job or have found another job. Some people have even argued that ban the box laws cause former criminals to waste their own time interviewing for jobs they will never get, rather than applying for jobs that are more likely to hire ex-cons.

== Fair Chance ==
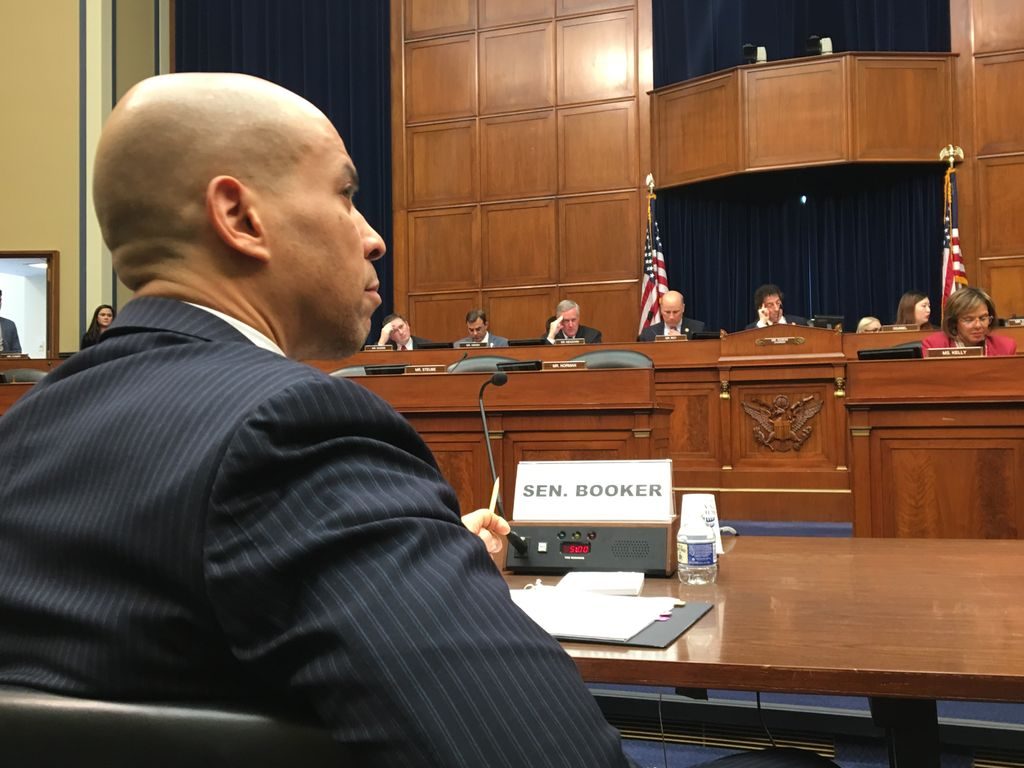
Senator Cory Booker testifying in front of a House Oversight subcommittee in support of a federal Fair Chance Act in 2019.

The terms Ban the Box and Fair Chance Act are often used interchangeably.

In 2014, the San Francisco Board of Supervisors unanimously passed the Fair Chance Ordinance, authored by Supervisors Jane Kim and Malia Cohen. On October 27, 2015, New York City enacted the Fair Chance Law. In 2016, Austin became the first city in the south to ban the box, led by Greg Casar.

In March 2018, Washington Governor Jay Inslee signed the Washington Fair Chance Act into law. In August 2017, Seattle additionally adopted a "Fair Chance Housing Ordinance", which prohibits landlords from considering the criminal history of a renter except for some sex crimes.

== Implementation ==
=== United States ===
The "Ban the Box" movement requires employers to eliminate the question on a job application that asks about an applicant's criminal history and attempts to reduce an employers' accessibility to criminal records until later on in the application process. The goal of this initiative is to decrease discrimination against applicants who may have a criminal history. Hawaii was the first state to implement the law in 1998. In 2015, President Obama "banned the box" on applications for federal government jobs. Many private employers, including Walmart, Target, and Koch Industries, decided to initiate the policy before it was required to do so due to public pressure. As of 2018, 11 US states have mandated the removal of conviction history questions from job applications for private employers.

Restrictions that Ban the Box imposes on employers in regards to criminal history:

1. What employers can ask prospective employees before they are hired
2. When an employer can inquire about ones criminal history
3. How far back in ones criminal history an employer can inquire about

There are also differences in legislation from state to state. These differences include: the types of jobs and employers who are covered, what stage of employment an employer can inquire about an applicants criminal history, and to what extent criminal records can be utilized when making decisions on offering employment.

The "Ban the Box" initiative has begun to move into the private sector as well with approximately 15 states outright banning employers from inquiring about past criminal history.

=== California ===
The State of California has a statewide Ban the Box law, officially known as the California Fair Chance Act, which assists Californians with conviction histories to re-enter society by prohibiting employers from asking about conviction history before making a job offer. The California Ban the Box Law applies to public and private employers with five or more employees. Under the California Ban the Box Law, an employer may conduct a criminal history check only after making the applicant a conditional job offer. If the applicant has a conviction history, the employer must perform an individualized assessment regarding the conviction history. The individualized assessment requires the employer to weigh the applicant's conviction history against the position and ascertain the viability of extending employment. The employer may not deny employment unless the applicant's conviction history has a direct and adverse relationship with the position's duties that justify a denial. In performing the individualized assessment, the employer must consider the following factors:

- The nature and gravity of the offense;
- The time passed since the offense or sentence completion; and,
- The nature of the job held or sought.

If, after completing the individualized assessment, the employer wishes to deny employment, the Ban the Box Law prescribes a procedure for providing the applicant with notice. First, the employer must make a written preliminary decision and notify the applicant of the disqualifying conviction. The applicant has an opportunity to respond. The employer must consider any new information offered by the applicant before making a final decision.

=== San Francisco ===
In 2005, the San Francisco Board of Supervisors adopted a resolution initiated by "All of Us or None" calling for San Francisco to eliminate hiring discrimination against people with criminal records by removing the criminal history requests on applications for public employment. The resolution impacted municipal hiring policy. In 2014, the San Francisco Board of Supervisors adopted San Francisco's Ban the Box law, officially known as the San Francisco Fair Chance Ordinance, which expanded the city's Ban the Box policy to cover both private and public employers.

San Francisco's Ban the Box law largely mirrors California's Ban the Box law. Notably, San Francisco's Ban the Box law includes unique penalties for employer violations, including liquidated damages of $500 for each day an applicant or employee's San Francisco Ban the Box law rights were violated. Claims under San Francisco's Ban the Box law must be filed within one year of the date of last violation.

=== Oakland ===
In 2020, Oakland, California, passed a Ban the Box law in housing, titled the Oakland Fair Chance Housing Ordinance. Effective January 2020, the Ordinance prohibits most Oakland landlords from inquiring into an applicant's conviction history or conducting a criminal background check. Landlords that violate the Ordinance face potential exposure to severe damages in a civil lawsuit.

== Impact ==
In June 2016, a large experimental study was published by Amanda Agan and Sonja Starr on the racial gap in callback rates of employers to job applicants of different racial backgrounds in New Jersey and New York City before and after Ban the Box laws went into effect. Agan and Starr sent out 15,000 fictitious online job applications to companies in those areas with racially stereotypical names on the job applications. Prior to the implementation of Ban the Box laws in New Jersey and New York City, the gap in the callback rate between the job applications with stereotypically black names and stereotypically white names was 7 percent. After the implementation of Ban the Box laws, the racial gap in the callback rate increased to 45 percent.

A July 2016 study by Jennifer L. Doleac and Benjamin Hansen found that in jurisdictions where Ban the Box laws have been implemented, the probabilities of young, non-college educated, black and Hispanic males being employed have declined.

An October 2006 study with a similar finding published by Harry J. Holzer, Steven Raphael, Michael A. Stoll found that employers who made routine criminal background checks for all job applicants, regardless of their racial backgrounds, hired black applicants (especially black males) at a higher rate than those employers that did not make routine criminal background checks for all applicants.

A 2019 study in Economic Inquiry found that BTB raised "the probability of public employment for those with convictions by about 30% on average," without any adverse effects for young low-skilled minority males.

A 2020 study by economist Evan K. Rose found that Ban the Box had negligible effects on ex-offenders' labor market outcomes.

== See also ==
- Felony disenfranchisement
- Streisand effect
