= Jeffrey A. Roth =

American criminologist

Jeffrey A. Roth is criminologist and associate director for research at the University of Pennsylvania's Jerry Lee Center of Criminology.

Roth's research has focused on juvenile crime trends, particularly the decrease in crime rates since 1993.

Roth has co-chaired, with Christopher S. Koper, evaluations of federal laws and programs, including the Federal Assault Weapons Ban, and the Community Oriented Policing Services(COPS) program. Roth has also evaluated many state and local crime reduction programs.

Jeffrey A. Roth served as director on the National Academy of Sciences panel on Understanding and Preventing Violence.
