= Harry J. Holzer =

American economist, educator and analyst

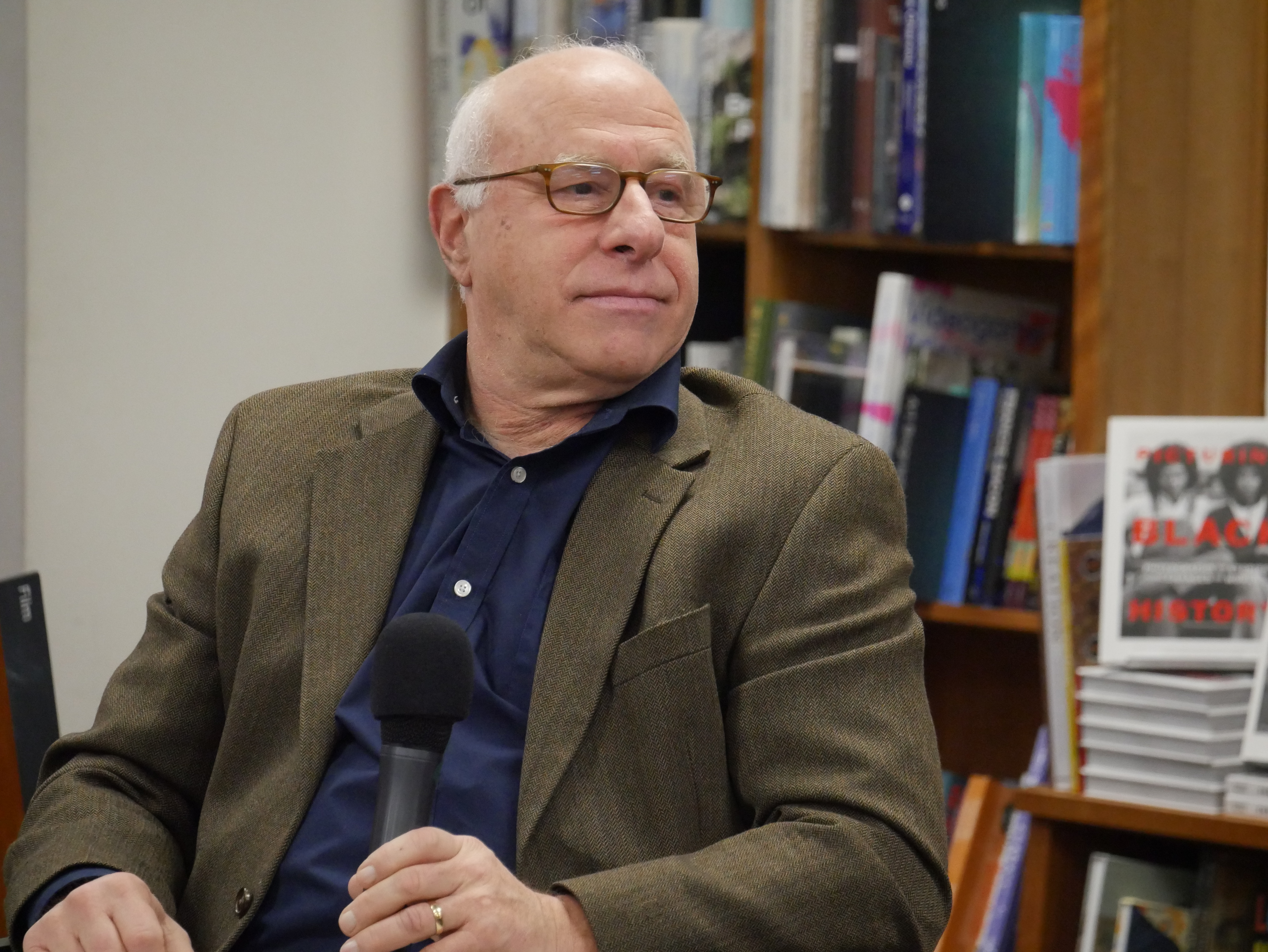
- Born: February 25, 1957 (age 69)

Academic background
- Education: Harvard University

Harry Joseph Holzer (born February 25, 1957) is an American economist. Holzer served as the chief economist for the United States Department of Labor during the Clinton administration. Holzer has been a critic of the Democratic Party's perceived identity politics and has instead advocated for practical policies such as improved education and job training and a focus on "good jobs" to improve earnings among workers without college degrees.

== Early life ==
Holzer grew up in a rural area near Atlantic City, New Jersey. His parents, Simon and Suzanne (née Wester), were Holocaust survivors from Poland. His father owned and operated a small chicken farm, while his mother was a seamstress and operated a fabric shop. His only sister, Marilyn, is an occupational therapist in Jerusalem.

Holzer holds an A.B. from Harvard University in 1978 (graduating summa cum laude and Phi Beta Kappa) and earned his Ph.D. in 1983 from Harvard University in economics.

He resides in Chevy Chase, Maryland, with his wife, Deborah, a clinical social worker and therapist. They have three daughters.

== Career ==
Besides his stint as Chief Economist at the US Department of Labor in the Clinton administration, Holzer has been an academic economist with a variety of appointments at research and policy institutions for his entire career.

Holzer is the John LaFarge Jr. SJ Professor of Public Policy at the McCourt School of Public Policy Georgetown University. He has been an AIR Scholar and Institute Fellow at the American Institutes for Research (AIR), where he has served as co-director of the research program on post-secondary education and the labor market for the National Center for the Analysis of Longitudinal Data in Education Research (CALDER); he has also co-led workforce policy research for the Equity Initiative. Holzer was a faculty founder and co-director of the Georgetown Center on Poverty and Inequality. He is a nonresident senior fellow with the Brookings Economic Studies Program. He is also a research affiliate of the Institute for Research on Poverty at University of Wisconsin-Madison and a national affiliate of the Stanford Center on Poverty and Inequality. He served as associate dean (2004–06) and acting dean of the Georgetown Public Policy Institute (now the McCourt School of Public Policy).

Holzer was a member of the editorial board at the Journal of Policy Analysis and Management, and is a research fellow at the Institute for Labor Economics (IZA). He was a member of the board of directors for the Economic Mobility Corporation and served as a director for the National Skills Coalition. He was a professor of economics at Michigan State University (1983–2000), a visiting scholar at the Russell Sage Foundation and a faculty research fellow of the National Bureau of Economic Research.

Holzer was a signer of a 2018 amici curiae brief that expressed support for Harvard University in the Students for Fair Admissions v. President and Fellows of Harvard College lawsuit. But, in recent years, he has become more critical of the excesses of DEI programs at elite US colleges and universities.

== Research ==
Holzer's research has focused on the labor market problems of low-wage workers and other disadvantaged groups, particularly Black workers. He has studied the question of how employer characteristics, hiring practices and the job quality affect job opportunities for less-skilled workers, especially when they create "mismatches" between worker skills and those sought by employers, and between their respective geographic locations (or "spatial mismatch").

Holzer studied employer data extensively and implemented surveys of about 4000 firms during the 1990s on their hiring practices, skill needs and workforce characteristics. He analyzed trends in job quality and their effects on upward mobility for low-wage workers using LEHD data on workers and firms from the U.S. Census Bureau. He has analyzed data on postsecondary education and employment outcomes, especially for disadvantaged workers.

Holzer's more recent work focuses on the challenges low-income youth and adults face in American higher education and in the job market. He has written extensively about the employment problems of disadvantaged men (especially those with criminal records), advancement prospects for the working poor, and workforce development policy. He also has written about welfare reform, discrimination, affirmative action, job training programs, and the Earned Income Tax Credit. He recently served as an author of the National Academy of Sciences study on Reducing Intergenerational Poverty and also on the NAS panel on Federal Policy Impacts on Child Poverty. Earlier he helped coauthor the NAS report on Building a Skilled Technical Workforce.

Holzer's research on employment issues and policy has been funded by grants from the Joyce Foundation, the U.S. Department of Health and Human Services, the Rockefeller Foundation, the Russell Sage Foundation, the Institute for Research on Poverty, the Upjohn Institute, the U.S. Department of Labor, the National Science Foundation, Ford Foundation, Mott Foundation, the MacArthur Foundation, the Smith Richardson Foundation, the Gates Foundation, and the Public Policy Institute of California.

== Works ==
=== Books ===
- Freeman, Richard B.; Holzer, Harry J., eds. (1986). The Black Youth Employment Crisis. University of Chicago Press. doi:10.7208/chicago/9780226261829.001.0001. ISBN 9780226261645.
- Holzer, Harry J. (April 1, 1989). Unemployment, Vacancies and Local Labor Markets. W.E. Upjohn Institute for Employment Research. doi:10.17848/9780880996143. ISBN 9780880996143.
- Holzer, Harry J. (1996). What employers want : job prospects for less-educated workers. Russell Sage Foundation. ISBN 1610442954. OCLC 1058902821.
- Farley, Reynolds; Danziger, Sheldon; Holzer, Harry (May 25, 2000). Detroit Divided. Russell Sage Foundation. ISBN 9781610441988. OCLC 1100937750.
- Holzer, Harry J.; Michael, Stoll, eds. (2001). Employers and welfare recipients : the effects of welfare reform in the workplace. Public Policy Institute of California. ISBN 1582130574. OCLC 45201939.
- The Economics of Affirmative Action. (Co-edited with David Neumark.) Edward Algar, 2004
- Andersson, Fredrik; Holzer, Harry J.; Lane, Julia (2006). Moving up or moving on : who advances in the low-wage labor market?. Russell Sage Foundation. ISBN 0871540568. OCLC 122903471.
- Edelman, Peter B.; Holzer, Harry J.; Offner, Paul (2006). Reconnecting disadvantaged young men. Urban Institute Press. ISBN 0877667284. OCLC 62342019.
- Reshaping the American Workforce in a Changing Economy, (coedited with Demetra Nightingale). Washington, DC: Urban Institute Press, 2007
- Hill, Carolyn J.; Holzer, Harry J.; Chen, Henry (April 3, 2009). Against the Tide: Household Structure, Opportunities, and Outcomes among White and Minority Youth. W.E. Upjohn Institute for Employment Research. doi:10.17848/9781441612663. ISBN 9781441612663.
- Holzer, Harry J.; Lane, Julia; Rosenblum, David; Andersson, Fredrik (2011). Where are all the good jobs going? : what national and local job quality and dynamics mean for U.S. workers. Russell Sage Foundation. ISBN 9781610447232. OCLC 808337199.
- Holzer, Harry J.; Baum, Sandy (2017). Making college work : pathways to success for disadvantaged students. Brookings Institution Press. ISBN 9780815730217. OCLC 1026518911.

=== Articles ===
Harry Holzer is the author of over 60 articles in peer-reviewed journals in economics and public policy, including articles in the American Economic Review, the Quarterly Journal of Economics, the Journal of Economic Literature, the Review of Economics and Statistics, the Journal of Labor Economics and the Journal of Policy Analysis and Management.

He has written dozens of book chapters and many public policy briefs for the Brookings Institution and the Urban Institute, and provided testimony to Congressional committees and other federal agencies.

== Recognition ==
He is listed in Who's Who in Economics (2003 edition) and in Marquis’ Who's Who in America (beginning in 2008). Other honors include:

- The Policy Innovation Prize from the Hamilton Project at the Brookings Institution (2011)
- The Leslie Whittington Award at Georgetown University (2002)
- The Distinguished Faculty Award at Michigan State University (1998)
- The Teacher-Scholar Award at Michigan State University (1988)
