= David Neumark =

American economist

- Born: July 7, 1959 (age 67)

Academic background
- Education: Harvard University; University of Pennsylvania

Academic work
- Discipline: Labor economics
- Institutions: University of California, Irvine
- Website: Information at IDEAS / RePEc

David Neumark (born July 7, 1959) is an American economist and a Chancellor's Professor of Economics at the University of California, Irvine, where he also directs the Economic Self-Sufficiency Policy Research Institute.

== Education ==
Neumark graduated with a B.A. in economics in 1982 from the University of Pennsylvania. He graduated Phi Beta Kappa, Summa Cum Laude, with Honors. He went on to complete his M.A. in 1985 and Ph.D. in 1987 in economics from Harvard University. His fields were labor economics and econometrics. His dissertation was entitled Male-Female Differentials in the Labor Force: Measurement, Causes and Probes, and published in parts in the Journal of Human Resources.

== Academic career ==
From 1989 to 1994, Neumark was an assistant professor of economics at the University of Pennsylvania. He became a professor at Michigan State University in 1994 and remained at MSU until 2004. Since 2005, he is a professor of economics at the University of California, Irvine. He is also a research associate at the National Bureau of Economic Research and the Institute for the Study of Labor (IZA).

== Research ==
Neumark's research interests include minimum wages and living wages, affirmative action, sex differences in labor markets, the nature of labor market discrimination (e.g., taste-based versus statistical discrimination), the economics of aging, and school-to-work programs, and he has also done work in demography, health economics, development, industrial organization, and finance. His work has been published in economics journals like the American Economic Review, the Quarterly Journal of Economics, the Journal of Political Economy, the Journal of Labor Economics, the Journal of Human Resources. He is currently the editor of the IZA Journal of Labor Policy and a co-editor of the Journal of Urban Economics.

Books

- The Economics of Affirmative Action. (Co-edited with Harry J. Holzer.) Edward Algar, 2004.

His 2008 book with William Wascher, Minimum Wages, published by the MIT Press, provides a summary of the dozens of papers he and others have written on the effects of minimum wages. The book covers the effects of minimum wages on employment, schooling, training, income inequality, and poverty.
