= Project Safe Neighborhoods =

Nationwide initiative in the US to reduce crime

Project Safe Neighborhoods (PSN) is a national initiative by the United States Department of Justice with the help of the Bureau of Alcohol, Tobacco, Firearms and Explosives (ATF) to reduce gun violence in the United States. The project's aim is to improve neighborhood safety and decrease gun violence in American communities. Project Safe Neighborhoods was established in 2001 through support from President George W. Bush. The program expands upon strategies used in Boston's Operation Ceasefire, and in Richmond, Virginia's Project Exile.

PSN initiatives typically involve United States attorneys working with local law enforcement to implement programs such as Gang Crime Investigation and Suppression, Prevention and Education, Gang Resistance Education and Training (G.R.E.A.T.), and Data Sharing and Gathering. Each local strategy incorporates the three national priorities:

- Increased prosecution of violent organizations.
- Heightened enforcement of all federal laws.
- Renewed aggressive enforcement of federal firearms laws.

Since 2001, over $1.5 billion of federal dollars have been allocated to support Project Safe Neighborhoods. Funds have been used to hire additional prosecutors and provide assistance to state and local jurisdictions in support of training and community outreach efforts.

On May 26, 2021, the United States Department of Justice launched a violent crime reduction strategy strengthening PSN so that it is built on newly articulated core principles including improving the community's view of the initiative, providing support to community organizations that improve neighborhood safety, and carefully monitoring any improvement in communities where PSN initiatives have been instated.
