= Christopher S. Koper =

Christopher S. Koper is Professor of Criminology, Law and Society at George Mason University, and a senior fellow and co-director of the evidence-based policing program in the Center for Evidence-Based Crime Policy.

He holds a Ph.D. in criminology and criminal justice from the University of Maryland and has over 25 years of experience conducting criminological research at PERF, the University of Pennsylvania, the Urban Institute, the RAND Corporation, the Police Foundation, and other organizations, where he has written and published extensively on issues relating to firearms, policing, research methods, federal crime prevention efforts, juvenile delinquency, and other topics. Dr. Koper is also a former scholar-in-residence of the Firearm and Injury Center at Penn (a center of the University of Pennsylvania Health System).

Previously a research criminologist at the University of Pennsylvania's Jerry Lee Center of Criminology and the Firearm and Injury Center and the Director of Research at the Police Executive Research Forum, Koper specializes in research pertaining to firearms and gun violence, policing, research and statistical methodology, and white-collar crime. Koper has also evaluated federal laws and programs, including the Federal Assault Weapons Ban, and the Community Oriented Policing Services (COPS) program.

== Publications ==
- Koper, Christopher S. (2004). An Updated Assessment of the Federal Assault Weapons Ban: Impacts on Gun Markets and Gun Violence, 1994-2003, Report to the National Institute of Justice (PDF).
- Koper, Christopher S., Edward R. Maguire, Gretchen E. Moore, David E. Huffer (2001). Hiring and Retention Issues in Police Agencies: Readings on the Determinants of Police Strength, Hiring and Retention of Officers, and the Federal COPS Program (PDF). The Urban Institute.
- Roth, Jeffrey A., Christopher S. Koper, William Adams, Sonja Johnson, John E. Marcotte, Andrew Scott, Maria Valera, Douglas A. Wissoker (1997). Impact Evaluation of the Public Safety and Recreational Firearms Use Protection Act of 1994 (PDF). The Urban Institute. Archived from the original (PDF) on November 26, 2013.
