= Project Exile =

Project Exile is a federal program started in Richmond, Virginia, in 1997. Project Exile shifted the prosecution of illegal technical gun possession offenses to federal court, where they carried a mandatory minimum sentence of five years in federal prison under the federal Gun Control Act of 1968, rather than in state court. Note that federal law (18 U.S. Code § 922(g) & 924) at the time provided for a penalty of up to ten years in federal prison for being a "prohibited person", i.e., a convicted felon in possession of a firearm, as well as for falsifying information in order to obtain one, or furnishing a gun to a convicted felon.

The program has since been copied by several other cities, sometimes under other names. In Atlanta, for example, the program was known as FACE 5 (Firearms in Atlanta Can Equal 5 years in federal prison). While many have discontinued or modified their programs, Project Exile is still in effect in Rochester, New York.

== Origin and implementation ==
The program was designed to address the gang violence which had plagued Richmond. At the time of its inception, the level of murders and shootings had regularly increased each year, with Richmond's murder-per-capita rates being one of the highest five for the country. In 1997, 140 people were murdered, 122 of them with firearms. There was strong community support for federal intervention. The African American community was being devastated by the violence (80% of all the homicide victims in Richmond were African-American). Half of the victims had no prior criminal record and many were innocent bystanders, the result of drug dealers' poor marksmanship and wild shooting at targets of opportunity.

The guiding principle of the program was to remove from the streets those who were mostly likely to commit gun violence: criminals with guns. This included convicted felons caught with guns (federal law prohibits felons from owning firearms) and those who committed crimes with a gun. It also intended to deter would be-offenders with strict sentencing, specifically longer sentences with no possibility of bail or early release.

Project Exile was named for the idea that if the police catch a criminal in Richmond with a gun in a crime, the criminal has forfeited his right to remain in this community, will face immediate federal prosecution and stiff mandatory federal prison sentences (often five years), and will thus be "exiled" to federal prison, often far away from the criminal's home town.

In 1997, the program was implemented in conjunction with an extensive public outreach and media campaign to educate citizens about lengthy federal prison sentences for gun crimes and to maximize deterrence. The message "An Illegal Gun Gets You Five Years in Federal Prison" was placed on 15 billboards, a fully painted city bus carried the message changing routes every day, TV commercials, Metro Richmond traffic reports, over a million supermarket bags were also used to advertise Project Exile. Rochester, New York, became the second city to implement the plan in 1998 under the leadership of Mayor Bill Johnson.

In 2001, after the launch of a similar state program named Virginia Exile, Project Exile evolved from a federal-only program to a larger cooperative effort with state and local authorities meeting bimonthly to review ongoing arrests to determine in which venue to bring the case so as to ensure the maximum possible penalty. President George W. Bush made the program a part of his Project Safe Neighborhoods crime-prevention plan, which included increased funding for U.S. attorneys to prosecute gun crime.

== Politics ==
In Congress, Project Exile had both supporters (such as Representative Bill McCollum of Florida, Sue Myrick of North Carolina, and Bob Ehrlich of Maryland) and opponents (such as Representatives Bobby Scott of Virginia and Maxine Waters of California).

=== Support ===
The National Rifle Association of America (NRA) and the Brady Campaign were both early and vocal supporters of Project Exile. The NRA lobbied the U.S. Congress to help secure $2.3 million for emulation of Exile in Philadelphia, Pennsylvania, and Camden County, New Jersey, where similar firearms-related violence has plagued the communities. The NRA has remained a strong supporter of the program as its focus is on severely punishing all gun crimes especially illegal possession rather than by making gun purchases more difficult. NRA executive vice president Wayne LaPierre stated "By prosecuting them they prevent the drug dealer, the gang member and the felon from committing the next crime... Leave the good people alone and lock up the bad people and dramatically cut crime."

=== Opposition ===
Project Exile was opposed by some gun-rights groups and some black leaders, the latter saying that it disproportionately affected African Americans. Families Against Mandatory Minimums also opposed the project.

A "Project Exile Condemnation Petition" was launched by Brian Puckett of GunTruths.com, Larry Pratt of Gun Owners of America, Angel Shamaya of KeepAndBearArms.com, and former NRA director Russ Howard. Other opponents who were members of this anti-Exile coalition included Jews for the Preservation of Firearms Ownership, the Law Enforcement Alliance of America, Libertarian Party presidential candidate Harry Browne, and science fiction writer L. Neil Smith.

== Results ==
Project Exile was widely praised after its first year's results were released.

Within the first year (1997–1998) Project Exile resulted in:

- The first Exile case made by Officer Gene Baskette, and Officer Mark Wooten of the Street Enforcement Unit of the Richmond Police Dept.
- 372 persons indicted for Federal gun violations.
- 440 illegally possessed guns seized.
- 300 persons arrested or held in State custody.
- 222 arrestees (more than 74 percent) held without bond.
- 247 persons convicted.
- 196 persons sentenced to an average of 55 months of imprisonment.

During the first year of Project Exile (1998), homicides in Richmond declined 33%, for the lowest number since 1987, and armed robberies declined 30%. In 1999, homicides declined another 21%. By 2007, homicides in Richmond were down to 57 compared to 122 in the year before Project Exile.

Research analysts offered different opinions as to the program's success in reducing gun crime.

Jens Ludwig and Steven Raphael, in a 2003 analysis of the program, argued that the decline in gun homicide was part of a general regression to the mean across U.S. cities with high homicide rates. A 2005 study by Richard Rosenfeld and others, published in Criminology & Public Policy, disagreed, concluding that Richmond's gun homicide rate fell more rapidly than the rates in other large U.S. cities, when controlling for other variables.

== Legacy ==
Project Exile, which was confined to Richmond and surrounding areas, has since been supplanted by Virginia Exile, the Commonwealth's statewide program which carries bail restrictions and imposes a mandatory minimum sentence of five years in a Virginia prison for those who:

- have a prior conviction for a violent felony and are convicted of possessing a firearm;
- are convicted of possessing a firearm on school property with the intent to use it, or displaying it in a threatening manner;
- are convicted of possessing a firearm and Schedule I or II drugs such as cocaine or heroin, or convicted of possessing more than a pound of marijuana with the intent to sell.
