= Michael Stoll =

American economist

Michael A. Stoll

Academic background
- Education: University of California, Berkeley, Massachusetts Institute of Technology

Academic work
- Discipline: Labor economics
- Institutions: University of California, Los Angeles' Luskin School of Public Affairs
- Website: Information at IDEAS / RePEc

Michael A. Stoll is an American economist and professor of public policy in the Luskin School of Public Affairs at the University of California, Los Angeles. He is also a fellow at the American Institutes for Research, the Brookings Institution, the Institute for Research on Poverty at the University of Wisconsin–Madison, and the National Poverty Center at the University of Michigan, Ann Arbor. He is known for his research on incarceration in the United States, including the 2013 book Why Are So Many Americans in Prison?, co-authored with Steven Raphael. The book argues, among other things, that the United States' incarceration rate is so high mainly because of changes in crime policy, not crime rates. His work on this topic was cited by the Obama administration in an April 2016 report on criminal justice reform. He has also studied migration within the United States by Americans in general and American retirees specifically.
