= Youth Crime Gun Interdiction Initiative =

American 1990s government program

The Youth Crime Gun Interdiction Initiative (YCGII) was led by the Bureau of Alcohol, Tobacco, Firearms and Explosives (ATF) during the late-1990s. The program aimed to increase firearm tracing of firearms recovered by law enforcement agencies, learn more about how juveniles and youth obtain firearms, and develop strategies to deal with problems involving illegally obtained firearms.

== Overview ==
The Youth Crime Gun Interdiction Initiative was established on July 8, 1996 by President Bill Clinton. The program was funded through support from the Department of the Treasury’s Office of Enforcement and the National Institute of Justice. The initiative involved collaboration between local law enforcement agencies, local prosecutors, the United States Attorney's Offices, and the ATF, in tracing firearms recovered by law enforcement.

Information learned through the YCGII include:

- Types of firearms most frequently recovered by police?
- Which crimes these weapons are associated with?
- How long it takes for firearms to move from a licensed firearms dealer to recovery by police?
- Which states are the source of these firearms?

YCGII also looked at differences in illegal firearms activity among adults, juveniles, and youths. The ATF also worked with state and local officials to improve reporting and data collection on recovered firearms and tracing.

In 1997, 17 cities across the United States participated in the Youth Crime Gun Interdiction Initiative. By 2000, the number of participating jurisdictions increased to 50.
