= Harvard Injury Control Research Center =

The Harvard Injury Control Research Center (abbreviated HICRC) is a research center at the Harvard T.H. Chan School of Public Health dedicated to studying injury prevention. In November 2016, the Center received a grant of over $650,000 from the National Institute of Justice to study police shootings. This was one of the few grants that the federal government has given to study gun violence in the last two decades.

== Personnel ==
- Director: David Hemenway
- Director of the Means Matter Campaign: Catherine Barber
- Director of research: Deborah Azrael
