= Steven Raphael =

American economist

- Born: Steven Paul Raphael; November 13, 1968 (age 57)
- Education: University of California, Berkeley (Ph.D., 1996)
- Awards: Goldman School of Public Policy Faculty Teaching Award, Award for Excellence in Housing and Development Research from the Association of Public Policy Analysis and Management and the U.S. Department of Housing and Urban Development (both in 2001)
- Scientific career
- Workplaces: University of California, Berkeley
- Thesis: An analysis of the spatial determinants and long-term consequences of youth joblessness (1996)

Steven Paul Raphael (born November 13, 1968) is an American economist. He is Professor of Public Policy in the Goldman School of Public Policy as well as a director of the Institute for Research on Labor and Employment at the University of California, Berkeley, and an adjunct fellow at the Public Policy Institute of California. He is also a research fellow at the University of Michigan National Poverty Center, the University of Chicago Crime Lab, and the Institute for the Study of Labor in Bonn, Germany.

== Education ==
Raphael received his B.A. from San Diego State University in 1990 and his Ph.D. from University of California, Berkeley in 1996.

== Research ==
Raphael's research focuses on economic aspects of low-wage labor markets, housing, and incarceration in the United States, as well as, more recently, the social consequences of mass incarceration in the United States. He has also studied the effectiveness of incarceration in decreasing crime in the modern United States, and has contended that "We have a fairly strong body of research that suggests as the incarceration rate goes up, the effectiveness of incarceration as a crime-control tool goes down." In 2014, he and Michael Stoll reported that incarceration was less effective at reducing crime when the prison population was high than when it was low. He has also co-authored studies with Stoll and Magnus Lofstrom finding that when California reduced its incarceration rate significantly, this reduction seemed to have no effect on violent crime rates in the state, and that it had a modest effect on property crime, especially auto theft. His research has also suggested that wages for low-skilled white American workers in Arizona declined during 2008 and 2009, but that the median incomes of employed workers in this group rose by 6% during this time.

== Editorial activities ==
Raphael is the former editor-in-chief of Industrial Relations: A Journal of Economy and Society.
