= Community Oriented Policing Services =

Component within the United States Department of Justice

- Seal of the United States Department of Justice

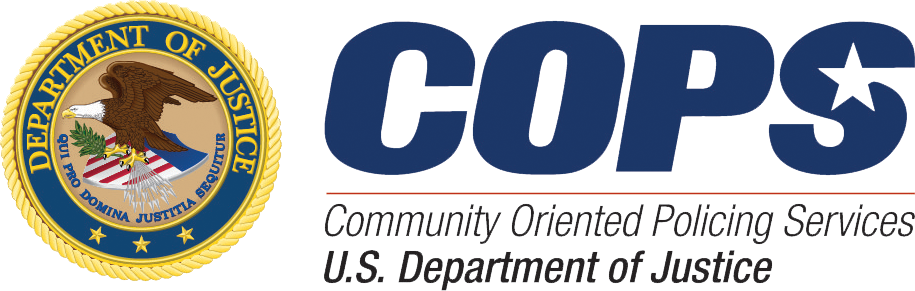
- United States Department of Justice's Community Oriented Policing Services' logo.

Department overview
- Formed: 1994; 32 years ago
- Jurisdiction: Federal government of the United States
- Headquarters: 145 N Street NE, Washington, D.C., United States
- Annual budget: $214 million
- Parent department: U.S. Department of Justice
- Website: cops.usdoj.gov

The Office of Community Oriented Policing Services (COPS Office) is a component of the United States Department of Justice. The COPS Office was established through a provision in the 1994 Violent Crime Control and Law Enforcement Act.

Since 1994, the COPS Office has provided $14 billion in assistance to state and local law enforcement agencies to help hire community policing officers. The COPS Office also funds the research and development of guides, tools and training, and provides technical assistance to police departments implementing community policing principles.
