= University of Chicago Crime Lab =

Criminological research center

Coordinates: 41.8829°N 87.6321°W

The University of Chicago Crime Lab is a nonpartisan behavioral and social science research lab based in Chicago, Illinois. Situated within the Harris School of Public Policy, the Crime Lab partners with community-based organizations and the public sector to generate evidence about the strategies that reduce gun violence and improve the criminal justice system.

In May 2022, The University of Chicago announced a $27.5 million donation from Kenneth Grifin and Michael Sacks to launch an initiative designed to train police managers and prevent neighbourhood violence. The funds will aid in launching two community Safety Leadership Academies. The Policing Management Academy aims to professionalize departments by educating their leaders though coaching, accountability and data-driven decision making. This donation came after Griffins $10 million donation to the Crime Lab in 2018 to implement an early intervention system to investigate citizens complains.
