= Experimental criminology =

Field of study within criminology

Experimental criminology is a field within criminology that uses scientific experiments to answer questions about crime: its prevention, punishment and harm. These experiments are primarily conducted in real-life settings, rather than in laboratories. From policing to prosecution to probation, prisons and parole, these field experiments compare similar units with different practices for dealing with crime and responses to crime. These units can be individual suspects or offenders, people, places, neighborhoods, times of day, gangs, or even police officers or judges. The experiments often use random assignment to create similar units in both a "treatment" and a "control" group, with the "control" sometimes consisting of the current way of dealing with crime and the "treatment" a new way of doing so. Such experiments, while not perfect, are generally considered to be the best available way to estimate the cause and effect relationship of one variable to another. Other research designs not using random assignment are also considered to be experiments (or "quasi-experiments") because they entail human manipulation of the causal relationships being tested.

== History ==
Some date the start of experimental criminology to the Cambridge Somerville Youth Study in Massachusetts in the 1930s, when 506 boys aged 5 to 13 were paired and randomly assigned to receive a multi-year program of support. The 30-year follow-up of this experiment by Joan McCord found that the expensive program had no effect on a difference in the criminality of the two groups, and that the program's recipient actually suffered more premature death. Other early landmarks included the Vera Institute of Justice Manhattan Bail project, which tested the practice of release-on-recognizance ("ROR") in lieu of money bail, and led to international adoption of ROR to reduce discrimination against the poor in justice practices.

The first randomized experiment in policing, according to research by Dr. Peter Neyroud at Cambridge University, began in Liverpool in 1963 to test the effects on juvenile delinquency of decisions to divert arrested juveniles from prosecution. The first randomized experiment in the use of arrest for any offence was approved by the Minneapolis City Council in 1981 at the request of Police Chief Tony Bouza to be led by Professor Lawrence W. Sherman, who was then the Director of Research of the Police Foundation in Washington. The policy impact and scientific attention given to the Minneapolis Domestic Violence Experiment and its five replications, while subject to controversy, is described by Australian Member of Parliament Andrew Leigh in his 2018 Yale University Press book entitled RANDOMISTAS: HOW RADICAL RESEARCHERS CHANGED OUR WORLD. Leigh's book (p. 919) credits Sherman with forging "a new discipline: experimental criminology." Sherman went on to lead or design over 40 randomized experiments with police in the US, Australia and UK, and to found the Academy of Experimental Criminology in 1998 as its first President.

The field of experimental criminology grew significantly during the 1990s and early 2000s, resulting in the establishment of the Crime and Justice Group of the Campbell Collaboration and other influential organizations, such as the societies of Evidence-based policing in five countries.

== Journals ==
In 2005, Springer-Nature Publishing launched the Journal of Experimental Criminology as an international, peer-reviewed publication, with Professor David Weisburd appointed the first Editor-in-Chief, followed by Professor Lorraine Mazerolle. In 2017 Springer launched the Cambridge Journal of Evidence-Based Policing, which focused on experimental criminology and other research led by pracademic police professionals, with Lawrence Sherman as the first Editor-in-Chief.

== American Society of Criminology ==
In 2010, the American Society of Criminology created a Division of Experimental Criminology as one of the currently 8 divisions of the largest society of criminologists in the English-speaking world.
