= Lawrence W. Sherman =

American criminologist and educator (born 1949)

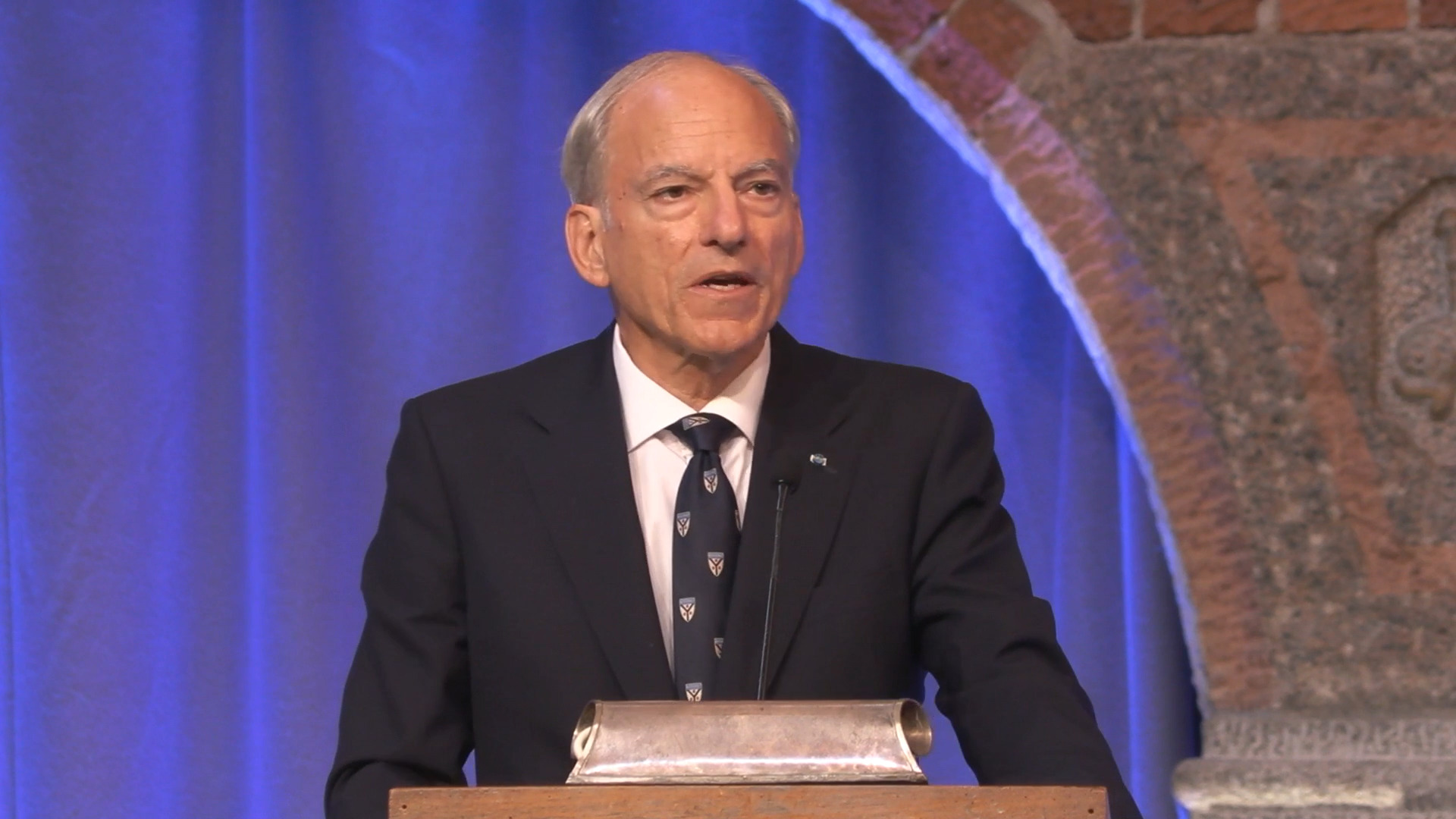
- Sherman in 2023
- Born: 25 October 1949 (age 76); Schenectady, New York
- Education: Denison University; Darwin College, Cambridge; University of Chicago; Yale University; Cambridge University; Academy of Experimental Criminology; International Society of Criminology
- Organizations: Cambridge Centre for Evidence-Based Policing; American Society of Criminology; American Academy of Political and Social Science; American Society of Criminology; Society of Evidence-Based Policing

Lawrence W. Sherman (born 25 October 1949) is a founder of the fields of experimental criminology and evidence-based policing. Currently the Chair of the Cambridge Centre for Evidence-Based Policing, his 1981 launch of the first randomized controlled trial of the effects of arrest on repeat offending, the Minneapolis Domestic Violence Experiment, prompted 28 US states to change their domestic violence laws. It also led to hundreds more experiments in policing world-wide. In 1998 he founded (with David P. Farrington) the Academy of Experimental Criminology, and was elected its first president. He also published his first paper on evidence-based policing, which became the basis for the graduate course for police leaders that he taught at the Cambridge Institute of Criminology from 2007 through 2022. His teaching led his graduate students to create professional societies of evidence-based policing attracting members in the UK, Australia-New Zealand, the USA, Canada and the Netherlands. Most of those countries have also applied Sherman’s principles (with Peter Neyroud and Eleanor Neyroud) for the design of the Cambridge Crime Harm Index as a single metric for summarizing crime statistics.

Prior to his appointment as Wolfson Professor of Criminology at the University of Cambridge, he founded the criminology department at the University of Pennsylvania and taught at the Universities of Maryland and Albany. With Jerzy Sarnecki he led the creation of the Stockholm Prize in Criminology and its annual jury decisions since 2006. With Heather Strang and John Braithwaite (criminologist) he conducted the first randomised trials of restorative justice in Australia and the UK. Sherman also designed or led the first randomised trials of police raids, saturation patrols of crime hotspots, and duration vs. frequency of patrol presence.

== Education ==
Sherman graduated magna cum laude from Denison University in 1970, with a B.A. in Political Science. He received an M.A. in social science from the University of Chicago in 1970, earned a Diploma in Criminology from Cambridge University in 1973, and received his M.A. and PhD in sociology from Yale University in 1974 and 1976 respectively.

== Academic career ==
Sherman's career began at age 20 in the New York City Mayor's Office and Police Department as a New York City Urban Fellow and a program research analyst to office of NYPD's reforming Police Commissioner Patrick V. Murphy, where he began a long research partnership with NYPD Assistant Chief Tony Bouza. Bouza became the Minneapolis Police Chief in 1980, where he persuaded the City Council to approve Sherman's research design to randomly assign arrest for misdemeanour domestic violence, later known as the Minneapolis Domestic Violence Experiment. Sherman's early experimental research into the influence of arrest on recidivism in spouse abuse led to changes in police department policies and procedures nationwide, encouraged state legislatures to modify state statutes to allow for misdemeanour arrest, and eventually resulted in five federally funded replications, one of which Sherman led in Milwaukee. In the late 1980s, Sherman's discovery of hot spots of crime led to his experimental research with David Weisburd and Tony Bouza that was first to show clear crime prevention effects of directed police patrol in high crime locations. In the early 1990s, Sherman's Kansas City Gun Experiment studied the effect of concentrated police patrol on gun crime and violence and that directed police patrol in gun crime "hot spots" led to an increase in seizures of illegally carried guns and a decrease in gun crimes.

Since 1995, Sherman has been co-directing a program of prospective longitudinal experiments in restorative justice alongside Heather Strang, involving approximately 2,500 offenders and 2,000 crime victims. He has also worked on the development of new tools for predicting murder among offenders on probation and parole in Philadelphia, as well as randomised trials of intensive services among highest-risk offenders.

From 1999 to 2007, Sherman was Greenfield Professor of Human Relations at the University of Pennsylvania, initially in the Department of Sociology. Under his leadership, Penn became the first Ivy League University to establish a PhD in criminology as a separate field in 2000, and the first to establish a separate department of criminology in 2003, when Sherman was appointed the university's first professor of criminology. He served as chair of the university's Department of Criminology from 2003 to 2007 and as the director of the Fels Institute of Government from 1999 to 2005. In June 2010 he returned to the University of Maryland as a Distinguished professor while jointly serving as Wolfson Professor of Criminology at Cambridge University from 2007 to 2017.

Sherman also served Maryland University as chair of the Department of Criminology and Criminal Justice from 1995 to 1999, and as a faculty member from 1982 to 1999. In 1987, he was the Seth Boyden Distinguished Visiting Professor at Rutgers University's Graduate School of Criminal Justice and from 1994 to 2016 he served as adjunct professor of law at the Australian National University's Research School of Social Science, and later in the ANU School of Global Governance (RegNet). From 1976 to 1980 he was on the faculty of the University at Albany's School of Criminal Justice.

From 2001 to 2007 he was the co-director of the Justice Research Consortium in the United Kingdom. Since 1995 has been the scientific director of RISE, an ongoing research program in partnership with Australian National University and the Australian Federal Police. From 1985 to 1995 he served as president of the Crime Control Institute, and from 1979 to 1985 he was the director of research and later vice-president for the Washington, D.C.-based Police Foundation.

In addition to his experimental research, Sherman has published articles and book chapters on a wide variety of topics, including police corruption, police education, police discretion, police crackdowns, restorative justice, investigations, police use of force, and fear reduction. In 1997, Sherman led a team of University of Maryland criminologists in producing 'Preventing Crime: What Works, What Doesn't, What's Promising, a Congressionally mandated evaluation of over 500 state and local crime prevention programs'.

== Research findings ==
His major research can be summarised as follows:

- In 1980, he discovered that restricting police powers to shoot people was not followed by any increases in crime, or in violence against police officers; this evidence was later cited by the US Supreme Court in its 1985 Tennessee v. Garner decision to restrict police powers to kill across the US.
- In 1984, the Minneapolis Domestic Violence Experiment found that arresting suspects in domestic violence cases was more effective at reducing re-offending than counselling or temporarily separating the suspect and victim.
- In 1987, he discovered that over half of all reported crime and disorder occurred at just 3% of the property addresses in a major city, a finding that has since been consistently replicated in other cities. He showed that exactly where and when crime will occur is far more predictable than anyone had previously thought, thus laying the theoretical and empirical basis for what is now called "hot spots policing," now widely practised from New York to Sydney.
- In 1995, he discovered that homicides, shootings and other gun crimes could be reduced by intensified but lawful use of police stop and search powers in hot spots of gun crime, a finding that has now been replicated in six out of six independent re-tests by other scholars. This research helped prompt a major change in police practice in the US that was followed by a substantial reduction in the US homicide rate.
- In 1992, he discovered that arrest has contradictory effects on different kinds of domestic violence offenders, causing less violence among employed men but doubling the frequency of violence among men without jobs. This finding has also been replicated by independent scientists, and is now the basis for some women's advocates to recommend abandoning mandatory arrest policies for non-injurious domestic assault.
- In 1995, with his colleague David Weisburd, he demonstrated that doubling or tripling the frequency of police patrols in crime hot spots could reduce street crime by two-thirds. This discovery has been replicated by other scholars as well.
- In 2000, with his colleague Heather Strang, he discovered that restorative justice conferences between violent offenders and their victims could reduce repeat offending by half.
- In 2006, with his colleagues Strang, Barnes and Woods, he showed that restorative justice also caused a 400% increase in criminal offending among Australian Aboriginals. He concluded that while restorative justice had been shown in most other places to be effective, it could backfire in some places.
- In 2008, Sherman discovered with Strang that nine ten out of ten of the restorative justice experiments they designed with victims present substantially reduced the overall two-year frequency of repeat convictions or arrests, across a wide range of offence types, offenders, and points in the criminal justice system. This included seven that were independently assessed by Professor Joanna Shapland of Sheffield University.
- In 2009, with Richard A. Berk and others, he discovered that a "data-mining" algorithm can predict which Philadelphia probationers are charged with murder or attempted murder 75 times more often than those the algorithm classifies as low-risk.
- In 2011, he first published his proposal for a "crime harm index" to weight any count of crimes by individuals, groups, cities and countries by the number of days in prison prescribed for each offence type by sentencing guidelines, irrespective of whether anyone is charged or convicted of each reported offence.
- In 2013, he developed the "Triple-T" framework for applying his 1998 model of evidence-based policing, showing how police decision-making could integrate systematic evidence on targeting, testing and tracking the use of police resources.
- In 2014, he discovered with Heather Harris that the long-term effect of arresting domestic abusers on their victims was to increase the victims’ death rate from all natural causes, but not homicide, compared to police warning the offender at the scene, with a doubling in mortality among African-American abuse victims from 5% to 10% over 23 years.
- In 2016, he published with Peter and Eleanor Neyroud the details of the Cambridge Crime Harm Index, a system for measuring multiple crimes in areas or by individuals with the total number of days imprisonment the crime could attract. The Index has since been used in various forms by police agencies in the UK, US, Sweden, Australia, and Uruguay. The paper and the concept won an award from Cambridge University's Vice-Chancellor.

Research on the prestige of scholars in criminology and criminal justice has listed Sherman as one of the most highly cited scholars in the field.

== Evidence-based policing ==
In a 1998 Police Foundation lecture, Sherman sketched out the concept of "evidence-based policing," modelled on the ideas of evidence-based medicine. His core idea was that police practice can be made far more effective if all of its complex but repeated elements were tested by repeated controlled field experiments. In February 2000, Sherman co-founded the Campbell collaboration's Crime and Justice Group, which has pursued the synthesis of research evidence on the effectiveness of policing and other crime prevention practices. Since then, the FBI Academy has offered a course on evidence-based policing, and it has become the subject of wide debate and commentary in police practice and research journals.

In 2008, Sherman made evidence-based policing (EBP) the core of the Police Executive Programme at Cambridge University, a part-time course of study for senior police leaders from around the world to earn a Diploma or Master's in applied criminology. In that year, the National Policing Improvement Agency (NPIA) funded the first international conference on EBP, which was attended by police executives from Asia, Australia, Europe and the US. Since then the conference has been held annually, with the 15th International Conference in 2022 attended by over 250 police and scholars from six continents, including Africa and Latin America.

In 2012, a group of UK police officers founded the Society of Evidence-Based Policing, and elected Sherman its first Honorary President, along with Sir Peter Fahy, Chief Constable of the UK's Greater Manchester Police; as of 2022 the Society has over 5,000 members, primarily UK police officers but with membership from Australia to Argentina and North America. In 2013, UK Home Secretary Theresa May appointed Sherman to a five-year term an independent non-executive director of the new College of Policing, which develops and promotes evidence of what works in policing.

== Institution building ==
Sherman has been a prime mover in the development on several permanent new additions to the institutional landscape of criminology. The most visible of these new institutions is the Stockholm Prize in Criminology, which philanthropist Jerry Lee and Sherman proposed to Professor Jerzy Sarnecki of Stockholm University in mid-2000, and which Sarnecki brought to the Swedish Ministry of Justice where it received support from successive Ministers. The annual Prize for criminological research or its application that benefits humanity was funded by the Jerry Lee Foundation for a guaranteed minimum of ten years, with the first prizes awarded in 2006. The Prize has been awarded annually since then, most often presented by a member of the Royal Family, with Sherman and Sarnecki as co-chairs of the International Jury that selects the winners. In 2012, Justice Minister Beatrice Ask concluded an agreement with the Soderberg foundations to provide joint funding with Ministry investment of a permanent endowment for a new Stockholm Prize Foundation, which guarantees annual funding of the Prize in perpetuity.

Sherman has also founded or helped to found the Academy of Experimental Criminology (in 1999), the Division of Experimental Criminology of the American Society of Criminology (in 2009), the Campbell Collaboration and its Crime and Justice Group (in 2000), the first Department of Criminology in the Ivy League – at the University of Pennsylvania (in 2003) and its PhD and MA degrees (in 2001), its Master of Science (2004), and its Jerry Lee Center of Criminology (in 2001). He also founded the first centre for experimental criminology in 2008, the Jerry Lee Centre of Experimental Criminology at the University of Cambridge Institute of Criminology.

== Awards and honours ==
Sherman has been the recipient of numerous honours and awards for his work in the field of criminology and policing. Sherman's work in establishing the Stockholm Prize in Criminology was recognised by the King of Sweden in 2016, who appointed Sherman a Knight "Commander of the Royal Order of the Northern Star" (KNO). In 2017, Yale University Graduate School awarded him the Wilbur Cross Medal for public service, and the University of Bialystok awarded him its medal for services to criminology. In 2011, the Royal Society of Arts in London awarded him its Benjamin Franklin Medal for his work on evidence-based crime prevention, and in 2009 he won the Beccaria Gold Medal of the Criminology Society of German-Speaking Countries.

In 2013, the University of Stockholm awarded him an honorary doctorate in social science, and George Mason University presented him its Award for Distinguished Achievement in Evidence-Based Crime Policy. In 2014 Denison University awarded him an honorary Doctorate of Humane Letters.

In 1998, he was elected the founding president of the Academy of Experimental Criminology; in 1999, he was elected a fellow of the Academy. In 2006, the Academy presented him with the Joan McCord Award for Outstanding Contributions to Experimental Criminology.

In 1994, Sherman was elected a fellow of the American Society of Criminology. In 1999, he received the Society's Edwin Sutherland Award for outstanding contributions to the field of Criminology and in 2020 the August Vollmer Award for outstanding contributions to criminal justice, in honour of the reforming police chief of Berkeley and Los Angeles who founded the ASC in 1941. In 2001 Sherman was elected President of the Society. He served as president of the International Society for Criminology from 2000 to 2005 and president of the American Academy of Political and Social Science from 2001 to 2005; the AAPSS also elected him as a Fellow in 2008.

In 1994, the Academy of Criminal Justice Sciences presented Sherman with the Bruce Smith Sr. Award, in recognition of outstanding contributions to criminal justice as an academic or professional endeavour. Sherman received the Distinguished Scholarship Award in Crime, Law and Deviance from the American Sociological Association in 1993, the Lee Jerry Lee Lifetime Achievement Award from American Society of Criminology's Division of Experimental Criminology and the Lifetime Achievement Award of the American Society of Criminology's Division of Policing.

== Personal life ==
During the Vietnamese War, Sherman served two years in alternative service as a conscientious objector. His father, YMCA Secretary Donald L. Sherman, and Mother, American Baptist Minister Margaret H. Sherman, campaigned for world peace and served as Non-Governmental Observers at the United Nations for the YMCA and American Baptist Convention, respectively . He is married to fellow criminologist Heather Strang. His two children, Eliot and Katharine, each have two children and reside in the US.

== Bibliography ==
=== Selected writings ===
- Lawrence W. Sherman. 2013. "The Rise of Evidence-Based Policing: Targeting, Testing and Tracking." Crime and Justice vol. 42, M. Tonry editor, University of Chicago Press, pp. 377–431.
- Lawrence W. Sherman, David P. Farrington, Brandon Welsh and Doris MacKenzie, eds., Evidence-Based Crime Prevention. London: Routledge, 2002.
- Lawrence W. Sherman, et al. 1997. Preventing Crime: What Works, What Doesn't, What's Promising. Report to the US Congress. Washington, D.C.: US Dept. of Justice, 655 pp.
- Sherman, Lawrence, Peter William Neyroud, and Eleanor Neyroud. "The Cambridge crime harm index: Measuring total harm from crime based on sentencing guidelines." Policing: a journal of policy and practice 10.3 (2016): 171–183.
- Lawrence W. Sherman, Policing Domestic Violence: Experiments and Dilemmas. N.Y.: Free Press, 1992. (Winner of 1993–94 Distinguished Scholarship Award, American Sociological Association, Section on Crime, Law and Deviance).
- Sherman, Lawrence W.; Smith, Douglas A. (1992). "Crime, Punishment and Stake in Conformity: Legal and Informal Control of Domestic Violence". American Sociological Review. 57 (5): 680–690. doi:10.2307/2095921. JSTOR 2095921.
- Sherman, Lawrence W.; Berk, Richard A. (1984). "The Specific Deterrent Effects of Arrest for Domestic Assault". American Sociological Review. 49 (2): 261–272. doi:10.2307/2095575. JSTOR 2095575. PMID 6742629. S2CID 21040479.
- Sherman, Lawrence W.; Gartin, Patrick R.; Buerger, Michael E. (1989). "Hot Spots of Predatory Crime: Routine Activities and the Criminology of Place". Criminology. 27: 27–55. doi:10.1111/j.1745-9125.1989.tb00862.x.
- Lawrence W. Sherman, Scandal and Reform: Controlling Police Corruption. Berkeley: University of California Press (1978) 304 pp.
- Sherman, Lawrence W. (1980). "Execution Without Trial: Police Homicide and the Constitution". Vanderbilt Law Review. 33 (1): 71–100. [Cited by U. S. Supreme Court in Tennessee v. Garner, 1985]
- Sherman, Lawrence W. (2000). "Gun Carrying and Homicide Prevention". Journal of the American Medical Association. 283 (9): 1193–1195. doi:10.1001/jama.283.9.1193. PMID 10703784.
