= Jerry Lee =

American criminology educator

- Born: April 20, 1936 (age 90); Sharon, Pennsylvania
- Education: Youngstown State University
- Known for: WBEB FM Radio, Criminology

Jerry Lee (born April 20, 1936, in Sharon, Pennsylvania) is a crime prevention philanthropist, proponent of evidence-based policy-making, and the former owner of the Philadelphia radio station WBEB-FM 101.1. Currently he is working on promoting the effectiveness of radio commercials, owns SpotQ Services, Inc., is the President of the Jerry Lee Foundation, and is involved in continuing to encourage the adoption of evidence-based criminology.

Additionally, he was the original donor of the Stockholm Prize in Criminology, the Jerry Lee Center of Criminology at the University of Pennsylvania (later the Jerry Lee Professor of Criminology), the Jerry Lee Centre of Experimental Criminology at the University of Cambridge, and helped found many organizations/initiatives such as the Coalition for Evidence-Based Policy.

== Early career ==
In 1960, Jerry Lee graduated from Youngstown State University, Ohio with a bachelor's degree in economics. After a brief stint with a management consulting firm, he became the general manager of WAQE FM in Baltimore. This was his first job in Radio before moving to Philadelphia in 1963 where he joined a new radio station being launched.

== Radio Station - WBEB-FM ==
Jerry Lee was hired by David Kurtz, the owner of WDVR 101 FM radio station, three weeks before the station went on the air in 1963. David Kurtz was trained as an Engineer and gave Jerry Lee the opportunity to work for the fledgling station. Jerry originally offered to work for very low pay but with a very high sales commission and set a goal for himself that the station would be the Number 1 rated FM radio station in Philadelphia in 12 months. He offered to quit if he did not achieve this goal. Originally, Jerry Lee had the title of Sales Manager but soon was running the station.

Originally the station was licensed to broadcast at 5,000 watts of power while the competition broadcast at 20,000 watts. Lower wattage makes it harder to find the station on the dial, which often means a station will have lower ratings and sales. By 1966 despite its low power, WDVR 101 FM had the largest audience of any FM Radio station in the country according to the Arbitron ratings. In order to create such a large audience, Jerry Lee employed a novel strategy for the time. While other stations played familiar songs 70% of the time, he insisted that WDVR play 100% familiar songs.

The station was originally assigned a low wattage because they would have interfered with the signals from two other radio stations. Jerry Lee saw this as one of the primary operational restrictions holding the station back. In 1968 Jerry Lee negotiated a mutual interference agreement with WCBS FM in New York City and in 1970 an agreement was reached with WGAL FM in Lancaster, Pennsylvania that allowed the station to achieve full power.

In February 1967, WDVR was able to move from the Germantown Neighborhood of Philadelphia to the more centrally located Bala Cynwyd. After this move Jerry Lee called a staff meeting, “I will do anything to double our sales in 1968, no matter how far out it is”. The station increased revenue from $339,000 in 1967 to $1,006,000 in 1968.

Some of the sales strategies that came out of that initial meeting included installing new technology like the new automatic IBM typewriter to use as a conversation piece and a continental height bar that was accessed by a sliding door adjacent to his office. The continental height bar proved such a successful sales tool that a penthouse was rented a block away from the studios and an authentic Spanish wine cellar was installed, the penthouse also had moving floors. The penthouse proved to be an even more effective sales tool than the bar adjacent to Jerry's office and automatic typewriter but not as effective as the yacht that was purchased for sales meetings in 1972.

AM dominated FM stations in ratings and in advertising. To change the perception of FM, Jerry decided to lease Cadillacs for every one of the sales reps. In late 1967 a deal with one of the top AM “Rep Firms” in the country (Petry Media Corp) was brokered and business with national advertising brands rose dramatically.

In February 1968, WDVR launched a $101,000 giveaway, consisting of 101 prizes worth $1,000. The contest was advertised by an Avis spokesperson on television, being the first time a professionally created TV commercial was ever made for a radio station. “Some time in the next few days, you will get the most important mailing of your life.” The audience for the station went up 35%”.

Out of the box thinking that was both audacious and carefully researched became the hallmark of the station’s continued ratings growth. This led to Lee becoming owner of 49.99% of the station in 1969.

In 1969 the James Bond car featured in Goldfinger and Thunderball that had an ejection seat was purchased and for the next 42 years was central to the James Bond room of Jerry Lee’s house. Taking a picture inside this car was a major attraction for advertisers, political fundraisers and visiting dignitaries.

One of Lee’s promotions in the mid-1980s focused on giving away 50,000 deluxe rosewood cabinet radios with 6-inch speakers to retailers in the region. The radios were manufactured so that they could only receive 101.1 FM. At the time it was relatively common to walk into a salon, barbershop, grocery store or other place of business and hear one of these radios playing 101.1 FM. As of 2024, it was anecdotally remarked that some of the original 50,000 radios are still in operation.

When the Telecommunications Act of 1996 was signed into law Lee saw a broader industry move toward consolidation coming. He was noted to say, “I knew that everyone would scramble to bulk up and buy a lot of stations that would require a lot of financing—and the first thing they would cut is their marketing budget, which they did. So, I increased my advertising over a three-year period from $1 million to $3.5 million a year.” This positioning helped WBEB maintain a large ratings lead.

Lee purchased the rest of the station's shares from Dave Kurtz's estate in 2005 and left the organization in 2018 with the sale to Entercom (now called Audacy).

== Productivity Initiatives ==
While a National Association of Broadcasters (NAB) Board Member in the early 1980s, Jerry Lee became concerned that the United States was experiencing reduced levels of productivity. After initiating productivity initiatives like BICIAP (Broadcast Industry Council to Improve American Productivity) and working with people like Howard K. Smith and Don Ephlin (the UAW person at Ford), real change occurred.

== Criminology ==
In 1996, Jerry Lee and his late partner David L. Kurtz founded the Lee Foundation. According to its website, the Jerry Lee Foundation is committed to solving social problems associated with poverty, especially in American inner cities which suffer from concentrated poverty. The Foundation's special concerns are elementary education and crime. Its major strategy is to support research to find out what works, what doesn't work, and what may be promising to prevent crime and improve education. Its major projects have been established at the Universities of Maryland, Pennsylvania, and Cambridge (England).

In 1997, the University of Maryland’s Department of Criminology and Criminal Justice invited Jerry Lee to serve as Chair of the Advisory Board of its multi-million dollar “Preventing Crime” program, which extended the work of its landmark 1997 Report to the US Congress on Preventing Crime: What Works, What Doesn't, What's Promising. The program made several Congressional Presentations, and in 2000 launched the annual Jerry Lee Symposium on Crime and Justice Research, originally at the US Capitol and for over 14 years held on Capitol Hill for an audience of policy-makers and practitioners.

The Jerry Lee Foundation enlisted other donors to support the Maryland Criminology Department in making term appointments of two research assistant professors (David Wilson and Spencer Lee), and of David Farrington as a research professor. Their work helped to lead to the founding in 2001 of the international Campbell Collaboration, of which Jerry Lee was one of three original incorporators and David Farrington was the first chair of the Coordinating Committee on Crime and Justice. The mission of the Campbell Collaboration is to provide decision makers around the world with sound evidence in implementing and evaluating policies in the areas of education, crime prevention and social services, derived from systematic reviews of research on specific policies, treatments and programs.

In 1999, the Jerry Lee Foundation, with the assistance of the Broadcast Industry Council and National Broadcast Association for Community Affairs, established an award of $2,500 to annually recognize outstanding community service programs, or programs, news series or public service campaigns promoting or examining the demonstrated effectiveness of local crime prevention programs. Also in 1999, he was elected to the Board of the Philadelphia Police Foundation and was elected chairman of the advisory board of the Fels Institute of Government at the University of Pennsylvania.

In 2000, Jerry Lee founded the Jerry Lee Center of Criminology at the University of Pennsylvania with a multimillion-dollar gift. Dean Samuel H. Preston appointed Lawrence W. Sherman, the Greenfield Professor of Human Relations, as the first director of the Lee Center, and later as the founding chair of University of Pennsylvania Department of Criminology, the first and still only department of criminology in the Ivy League. The Jerry Lee Center's goal is to foster collaboration among outstanding criminologists from around the world to further the discipline as a multi-disciplinary science in research, education and public service. The Jerry Lee Foundation supported this center with an initial gift of $5 million. The Jerry Lee Foundation also endowed two Jerry Lee assistant professorships in Criminology at Penn, to which such distinguished criminologists as John MacDonald and Charles Loeffler were appointed. The two assistant professorships were later consolidated as the Jerry Lee Chair in Criminology. Dr. Anthony Braga, an award-winning experimental criminologist, was appointed the first Jerry Lee Professor of Criminology at Pennsylvania University.

In 2001, Jerry Lee and Lawrence Sherman, in conjunction with Stockholm University Professor Jerzy Sarnecki, created an annual prize in criminology that recognized the contributions the field makes to the reduction of human suffering. As president of both the American and International Societies of Criminology in 2001–2, Sherman was able to muster global civil society support for the idea. Jerzy Sarnecki organized a meeting to discuss the idea with the State Secretary for the Swedish Ministry of Justice, Dan Eliasson, and the Minister of Justice, Thomas Bodstrom. The Ministry then agreed to support the creation of an annual Criminology Symposium, organized by the Swedish National Council on Crime Prevention, if a civil society association could raise funds to provide 1,000,000 Swedish Kronor in Prize money for a ten-year period, including support from a Swedish source. The Söderberg Foundations agreed to join in the plan, as well as the Hitachi Mirai Foundation and the Japanese Correctional Association.

At the 14th World Congress of Criminology in Philadelphia in 2005, funded by the Jerry Lee Foundation, Justice Minister Bodstrom announced the creation of the Stockholm Prize in Criminology and the awarding of the first Prizes scheduled for 2006. The Prize has been awarded annually since then in the same hall as the Nobel Prize Banquet, the main room of the Stockholm City Hall. In 2010, the Söderberg Foundations offered a generous challenge grant to create a permanent endowment for the Stockholm Prize, which was matched by the Swedish Ministry of Justice under the leadership of Justice Minister Beatrice Ask. In June 2012, Queen Silvia of Sweden witnessed the signing of the documents creating the permanent Stockholm Prize Foundation by the founders and co-founders, attesting to Jerry Lee's role as the original donor to the Prize. In most years the Prize has been presented to the winners by Queen Silvia of Sweden or another member of the Swedish Royal Family. The Prize winner selection by an international, independent Jury is sponsored by the University of Stockholm.

In 2007, the Jerry Lee Foundation pledged £1,000,000 to create the Jerry Lee Centre of Experimental Criminology at the University of Cambridge. The mission of the centre, the first of its kind at any university, is to promote the use and development of experimental criminology with operational partners who wish to test new interventions. Experimental criminology consists principally of randomized controlled field trials to develop and test theoretically coherent ideas about reducing harm from crime. Its long-term objective is to accumulate an integrated body of evidence about both the prevention and causation of crime. The centre has also supported Jerry Lee Scholars (all Cambridge PhD students in criminology), such as Dr. Renee Mitchell, the founding President of the American Society of Evidence-Based Policing, and post-doctoral Jerry Lee Fellows, including Professor Barak Ariel . The Director of Research at the Cambridge Jerry Lee Centre, Professor Lawrence W. Sherman, is known for his success in mobilizing serving police officers to design and carry out their own experiments across the UK and in other countries. The Director of the Cambridge Lee Centre, Dr. Heather Strang, is highly cited for the 12 randomized experiments in restorative justice that she led in Australia and the UK.

== Awards and honors ==
- 1987 President Ronald Reagan – President's Private Sector Initiative Award (on behalf of The Broadcast Productivity Council)
- 1989 President George H. W. Bush – President's Private Sector Initiative Award from
- 1997 Radio Ink – Broadcaster of the Year
- 1997 Broadcast Foundation of America – Leadership Award
- 1997 Broadcast Pioneers of Philadelphia – Person of the Year
- 1997 Broadcast Pioneers of Philadelphia – Hall of Fame
- 1999 PAB (Pennsylvania Association of Broadcasters) – Broadcaster of the Year
- 2001 PAB (Pennsylvania Association of Broadcasters) – Hall of Fame
- 2003 Academy of Experimental Criminology – Honorary Fellow
- 2003 Caring Institute, Washington, DC – National Caring Award
- 2003 Caring Institute, Washington, DC – Hall of Fame for Caring Americans Inductee
- 2004 Broadcasting + Cable – Hall of Fame
- 2006 NAB (National Association of Broadcasters) & BEA (Broadcast Education Association) – Malcolm Beville Award for Research
- 2007 NAB (National Association of Broadcasters) – National Radio Award
- 2008 King Carl XVI Gustaf of Sweden – Knight of the Polar Star in recognition of his role in establishing the Stockholm Prize in Criminology.
- 2008 Library of American Broadcasting – Giant of Broadcasting
- 2008 Radio Ink – Radio Executive of the Year
- 2011 Radio Ink – Lifetime Leadership Award
- 2017 PAB (Pennsylvania Association of Broadcasters) – Gold Medal Award
- 2010 Medal of Victory Award from the Wellness Community of Philadelphia for supporting their work with cancer patients.

== Leadership Roles ==
- 1970 PAB (Pennsylvania Association of Broadcasters) – Board of Directors
- 1970 NAB (National Association of Broadcasters) – Board of Directors
- Salvation Army - National Board of Directors
- PAB (Pennsylvania Association of Broadcasters) – Director Emeritus
- 2003 American Academy of Political and Social Science – Board of Directors
- RAEL (Research Committee for the Radio Advertising Effectiveness Lab) Committee – Chairman
- BICIAP (Broadcast Industry Council to Improve American Productivity) – Founder
- Broadcast Pioneers of Philadelphia – President

== See also ==
MacDonald, John M., Robert Kaminski, and Mike Smith. 2009. The Effect of Less-lethal Weapons on Injuries in Police Use of Force Events. American Journal of Public Health 99: 2268–2274.

Ridgeway, Greg, and John M. MacDonald. 2009. Doubly Robust Internal Bench- marking and False Discovery Rates for Detecting Racial Bias in Police Stops. Journal of the American Statistical Association 104: 661–668.

MacDonald, John M., Andrew Morral, Barbara Raymond, and Christine Eibner. 2007. The Efficacy of the Rio Hondo DUI Court: A 2-Year Field Experiment. Evaluation Review 31: 4-23.

Charles Loeffler, former Jerry Lee Assistant Professor of Criminology:

Loeffler, Charles. 2013. Does Imprisonment Alter the Life Course? Evidence on Crime and Employment from a Natural Experiment. Criminology 51: 137–166.

Aurélie Ouss was named Jerry Lee Assistant Professor of Criminology, University of Pennsylvania, in 2018. Dr. Ouss completed a post-doctoral fellowship at the University of Chicago Crime Lab and received her PhD in economics from Harvard University in 2013. Her research, which has received support from J-PAL North America, the Robert R. McCormick Foundation, and the MacArthur Foundation, examines how good design of criminal justice institutions and policies can make law enforcement fairer and more efficient.

Phillipe, Arnaud, and Aurélie Ouss. 2018. "No Hatred or Malice, Fear or Affection": Media and Sentencing. Journal of Political Economy 126: 2134–2178.
