= Evidence-based policing =

Law enforcement based on data collection and analysis

Evidence-based policing (EBP) is an approach to policy making and tactical decision-making for police departments. It has its roots in the larger movement towards evidence-based practices.

Advocates of evidence-based policing emphasize the value of statistical analysis, empirical research, and ideally randomized controlled trials. EBP does not dismiss more traditional drivers of police decision-making, but seeks to raise awareness and increase the application of scientific testing, targeting, and tracking of police resources, especially during times of budget cuts and greater public scrutiny.

== Origins ==
Experiments had been used in earlier decades to find better policing methods, before Lawrence Sherman first outlined a definition of "evidence-based policing" in 1998.

The Police Foundation was founded in 1970. In 1971–72 the Police Foundation worked with the Kansas City Police Department to carry out a landmark study on patrol cars in what is known as the Kansas City preventive patrol experiment.

In the early 1980s, Sherman worked with Richard Berk and the Police Foundation to carry out the Minneapolis Domestic Violence Experiment. The study showed that arresting domestic violence suspects was a deterrent against repeat offending. The study had a "virtually unprecedented impact in changing then-current police practices." Sherman later worked with fellow criminologist David Weisburd for a 1995 study which showed the efficacy of focusing police crime prevention resources on small hot spots of crime.

In a 1998 Police Foundation "Ideas in American Policing" lecture, Sherman outlined the concept of "evidence-based policing". His core idea was that police practice can be made far more effective if tactics proven to work during controlled field experiments are prioritized. Angel Cabrera later described Sherman as the "father" of evidence-based policing.

=== Societies of Evidence Based Policing ===
In February 2000, Sherman co-founded the Campbell Collaboration's Crime and Justice Group, which has pursued the synthesis of research evidence on the effectiveness of policing and other crime prevention practices. In 2013 Sherman established the Cambridge Centre for Evidence-Based Policing as a global police training and research consultancy service for members, and in 2017 he launched the Cambridge Journal of Evidence-Based Policing as the membership journal of the Cambridge Centre. The journal's priority is to publish original, applied research led by "pracademic" police officers, with many articles based on master's degree theses completed under supervision of Sherman and his Cambridge colleagues, Heather Strang and Sir Denis O'Connor, by police leaders who were mid-career, part-time students in the Cambridge Police Executive Programme.

The first professional Society of Evidence-Based Policing was founded at Cambridge University in 2010, and now has some 2,000 members from mostly UK police agencies. In 2013, police in collaboration with the University of Queensland established the Australian-New Zealand Society of Evidence-Based Policing, which now has over 2000 members. In 2015, both Canada, and the United States established their own branches of this learned professional society. The Police Foundation provided support for the establishment of the American Society of Evidence-Based Policing, as it once did to create the Police Executive Research Forum (PERF) and the National Organization of Black Law Enforcement Executives (NOBLE).

== United Kingdom ==
In 2008, Sherman made EBP the core of the Police Executive Programme at Cambridge University, a part-time course of study for senior police leaders from around the world to earn a Diploma or Master’s in applied criminology. In that year, the National Policing Improvement Agency (NPIA) funded the first international conference on EBP, which was attended by police executives from Asia, Australia, Europe and the US. Since then the conference has been held each July, with the 10th International Conference in 2017 attended by over 300 police and scholars from six continents.

In 2010, a group of UK police officers founded the Society of Evidence-Based Policing, and elected Sherman Honorary President, along with Sir Peter Fahy, Chief Constable of the UK's Greater Manchester Police; as of 2015 the Society has over 2,800 members, including its 750-member Australia-New Zealand affiliate, consisting primarily UK police officers but with membership from Australia to Argentina and North America. The Society's twice-annual UK meetings have attracted over 200 attendees per meeting (including 2015), as well as press coverage.

In 2012, the UK Home Office founded the College of Policing, which took over many of the responsibilities of the National Police Improvement Agency (formally abolished in 2013). One of the College's five strategic objectives is "identifying, developing and promoting good practice based on evidence". The College is committed to identifying and sharing with police practitioners "what works". In 2013, the UK's largest police force, London's Metropolitan Police Service committed to "crime fighting based on what we know works".

=== What Works Centre For Crime Reduction Toolkit ===
The College of Policing in the UK has created the What Works Centre for Crime Reduction, part of a network of What Works Centres created to provide easy access to robust and comprehensive evidence to guide decision-making on public spending. The Crime Reduction Toolkit is an online tool that allows users to obtain information on the evidence for and against various interventions (including their impact, cost and implementation) and use this to help shape their crime reduction efforts. The What Works Centre Crime Reduction Toolkit currently includes 35 evaluations of interventions and has identified over 300 systematic reviews covering 60 different interventions.

Intervention	Effects	Evidence	References
After-school programs	No impact on crime (but some studies suggest a decrease and or an increase)	Very strong quality	
Aggression replacement training for offenders	No impact on crime (but some studies suggest a decrease and or an increase)	Moderate quality	
Alcohol pricing, including alcohol tax	Decrease in crime	Strong quality	
Alley gating (installing locks and gates in alleyways to control access)	Decrease in crime	Very strong quality	
Alternative education programmes	No impact on crime (but some studies suggest a decrease and or an increase)	Strong quality	
CCTV	Decrease in crime	Strong quality	
Cognitive Behavioral Therapy	Decrease in crime	Strong quality	
Cognitive Behavioural Therapy (CBT) for Domestic Violence	No impact on crime (but some studies suggest a decrease)	Strong quality	
Correctional boot camps	No impact on crime (but some studies suggest a decrease and or an increase)	Very strong quality	
Criminal sanctions to prevent domestic violence	No impact on crime (but some studies suggest a decrease)	Limited quality	
Drunk driving (DWI) courts	No impact on crime (but some studies suggest a decrease)	Strong quality	
Drug courts	Decrease in crime (but some studies suggest an increase)	Very strong quality	
Educational interventions to prevent relationship violence in young people	No impact on crime	Very strong quality	
Electronic monitoring	No impact on crime (but some studies suggest a decrease)	Moderate quality	
Environmental design to prevent robbery	No impact on crime (but some studies suggest a decrease)	Limited quality	
Firearm laws	Decrease in crime (but some studies suggest an increase)	Strong quality	
Hot spots policing	Decrease in crime	Very strong quality	
Increased police patrols to reduce drunk driving	No impact on crime (but some studies suggest a decrease)	Strong quality	
Juvenile curfew laws	No impact on crime (but some studies suggest a decrease and or an increase)	Moderate quality	
Mass media campaigns to reduce drunk driving	No impact on crime (but some studies suggest a decrease)	Limited quality	
Mental health courts	Decrease in crime (but some studies suggest an increase)	Very strong quality	
Minimum legal drinking age (MLDA) laws	No impact on crime (but some studies suggest a decrease and or an increase)	Limited quality	
Moral Reconation Therapy	Decrease in crime	Strong quality	
Multisystemic therapy	No impact on crime (but some studies suggest a decrease)	Strong quality	
Music making interventions	No impact on crime	Limited quality	
Neighbourhood watch	Decrease in crime	Strong quality	
Policies on hours and days of alcohol sales	No impact on crime (but some studies suggest a decrease and or an increase)	Moderate quality	
Restorative Justice (RJ) conferencing	Decrease in crime	Very strong quality	
Retail tagging to prevent shop theft	No impact on crime	Strong quality	
"Scared Straight" programmes	Increase in crime	Very strong quality	
School-based programmes to reduce drunk driving	No impact on crime (but some studies suggest a decrease and or an increase)	Moderate quality	
Second responder programmes to prevent domestic abuse	No impact on crime (but some studies suggest a decrease and or an increase)	Strong quality	
Sobriety checkpoints	Decrease in crime	Very strong quality	
Street lighting	Decrease in crime	Very strong quality	
Temporary release from prison	No impact on crime (but some studies suggest a decrease)	Limited quality	
Training probation officers in core correctional practices	Decrease in crime	Strong quality	
Transferring youths to the adult criminal justice system	Increase in crime	Limited quality	
Victim Offender Mediation	Decrease in crime (but some studies suggest an increase)	Strong quality	
Wilderness challenge programmes	No impact on crime (but some studies suggest a decrease)	Strong quality	

== United States ==
EBP is acknowledged by some senior police leaders as a valuable approach to improve policing. The FBI Academy offers a course on EBP.

EBP has become the subject of debate in research journals, deliberating the extent to which policing should be guided by experimental criminology. There is a consensus that more needs to be done to bridge the 'translation gap' between frontline police officers and academics.

Academics from the Department of Criminology, Law and Society at George Mason University launched the Center for Evidence-Based Crime Policy in 2008. Their Evidence-Based Policing Matrix records, orders and rates scientific evaluations in policing and seeks to enable police departments to access and assess existing evidence.

In 2015, a group of working police officers and crime analysts formed the American Society of Evidence-Based Policing. This organization was formed with the intent of educating police officers about the concept of EBP, advocating for the use of best available research to drive policing strategies and tactics, and facilitating the creation of new research findings by connecting researchers and practitioners. Membership is open to all serving police officers, civilian staff members, researchers, and academics. The first annual ASEBP conference was held on the campus of Arizona State University in Phoenix, Arizona on May 22 and 23, 2017, with conference attendees and panelists representing the United States, Canada, Mexico and the United Kingdom.

== Australia ==
The Australia & New Zealand Society of Evidence Based Policing (ANZSEBP) was formed in April 2013 in Brisbane, Australia. The ANZSEBP is a police practitioner-led Society. The mission of the ANZSEBP is to develop, disseminate and advocate for police to use scientific research (“the evidence”) to guide best practice in all aspects of policing.

The Society comprises both full members (current, serving police officers in Australia and New Zealand) and honorary members including police staff members (non-sworn), research professionals and others who aim to make evidence-based approaches part of everyday policing in Australia and New Zealand.

The ANZSEBP held its inaugural conference at the Australian Institute of Police Management, Sydney, Australia in March 2015. The Society was fortunate to secure Professor David Weisburd (George Mason University), Mr Peter Neyroud (Cambridge University), Professor Lorraine Mazerolle (University of Queensland), Chief Superintendent Alex Murray West Midlands Police (Chair of the UK SEBP) and Assistant Commissioner Peter Martin (Chair of the ANZ SEBP) to present at the conference. Further to that six short shot presentations were made that highlighted experiments or research throughout Australasia.

== Canada ==
The Canadian Society of Evidence Based Policing (CAN-SEBP) was launched in April 2015 in Manchester, UK, as an affiliate of the UK-based Society of Evidence Based Policing, as well as ASEBP and ANZ-SEBP. CAN-SEBP is a collaborative effort between police practitioners and academic researchers aimed at generating actionable research to inform policy, practice, education and training in the field of public safety. Partners in the Society – who maintain executive-level steering and oversight functions – include representatives from several Canadian police forces and universities. Other agencies and researchers serve as active collaborators.

CAN-SEBP's membership consists of active and retired police officers, civilian police members, applied policing researchers, graduate researchers and representatives from provincial, federal and municipal community safety groups.

CAN-SEBP's international advisory group includes: Professor David Weisburd (George Mason University), Mr Peter Neyroud (Cambridge University), Professor Lorraine Mazerolle (University of Queensland), Chief Superintendent Alex Murray West Midlands Police (Chair of the UK SEBP) and Assistant Commissioner Peter Martin (Chair of the ANZ SEBP).

== New Zealand ==
In December 2017, a joint partnership between New Zealand Police, the University of Waikato, the Institute of Environmental Science and Research (ESR), and Vodafone New Zealand established the New Zealand Evidence-Based Policing Centre (EBPC). Considered the first of its kind in the world, the centre is dedicated to supporting evidence-based policing research projects and experiments being run by New Zealand Police staff as well as academic researchers. The centre's "blueprint" was a finalist in the 2019 World Class Policing Awards. In March 2020, as part of New Zealand's civil emergency response to the COVID-19 pandemic, the centre produced an evidence scan to inform NZ Police's response to COVID-19. Also, the Centre's Lambton Quay, Wellington, offices were repurposed as the All-Of-Government COVID-19 Operations Command Centre in 3 days, with the ability to house 70 operational staff from across the government sector. Under the leadership of out-going Police Commissioner Mike Bush, the operations centre opened on 23 March 2020.

== See also ==
- Crime science
- Evidence-based legislation
- Evidence-based policy
- Evidence-based practices
- Peelian principles
- Problem-oriented policing
