= Sarnecki =

Sarnecki (feminine Sarnecka) is a Polish surname. Notable people with the surname include:

- Jadwiga Sarnecka (1877 or 1883–1913), Polish composer and pianist
- Jerzy Sarnecki (born 1947), Polish-Swedish criminologist
- Rafał Sarnecki (born 1990), Polish racing cyclist
