= Marlin Taylor =

American radio broadcaster and executive

- Born: Marlin Raymond Taylor; August 26, 1935 (age 90); Abington, Pennsylvania
- Occupations: Radio broadcaster; program director; business executive
- Years active: 1956–2015
- Employer(s): Various radio stations (1956–1970); Bonneville (1970–1987); XM/SiriusXM (2000–2015)
- Known for: Creator of beautiful music format
- Website: marlintaylor.com

Marlin Raymond Taylor (born August 26, 1935) is an American former radio broadcaster, program director, and radio executive who is credited as the "father of beautiful music," an update of the older easy listening radio format popular from the 1960s to the 1980s. He initially developed the format, which primarily featured instrumental versions of popular songs and classical melodies, while working at WDVR in Philadelphia between 1963 and 1966.

Ratings success there and at Boston's WJIB led him to a position as general manager of the Bonneville International Corporation's New York FM station, WRFM, in 1969. With Taylor's "beautiful music" format, WRFM became the third-most listened to station in New York City by the fall of 1970. Taylor then formed and became the president of Bonneville Broadcast Consultants (BBC), a new Bonneville division that syndicated his beautiful music format to stations across the country. At its height, BBC provided beautiful music programming to almost 200 stations in the United States, Canada, and Australia.

Taylor left Bonneville in 1987, but returned to radio programming in 2000 with XM Satellite Radio. He developed XM programming for three stations: '40s Junction (big band), Escape (beautiful music), and enLighten (southern gospel). He officially retired from radio broadcasting in August 2015. Taylor was inducted into the Broadcast Pioneers of Philadelphia Hall of Fame in 2015 and the Southern Gospel Music Hall of Fame in 2021.

== Early life ==
Marlin Raymond Taylor was born on August 26, 1935 in Abington Township in Montgomery County, Pennsylvania. He grew up in nearby Bucks County primarily in the towns of Feasterville and Newtown located north of Philadelphia. He was raised by his mother, Marian Ivins Taylor. Taylor received his first radio when he was 11 years old and developed an interest in the medium throughout the 1940s. Although he lacked formal training or education, Taylor sought employment in the radio industry after high school. In 1956, he found a part-time job as technical operator at WTNJ-AM in Trenton, New Jersey. There, he engineered and produced a yearlong series of remote broadcasts and served as a control room and transmitter operator.

In the Spring of 1958 when Taylor was 22, he was drafted by the United States Army and later assigned to the Thule Air Force Base in Greenland for a year. While there, he worked as an on-air announcer for Armed Forces Radio at the base's radio station, KOLD. His stint in Greenland ended in April 1960, and Taylor went on to attend the U.S. Army Information School at Fort Slocum in New York. He finished his military service at Fort Meade in Maryland where he worked as a radio show producer for the Second U.S. Army Recruiting District.

== Career ==
=== 1961–1968: Early career and development of beautiful music format ===
In early 1961, Taylor applied to be the program director at the newly-built WHFS station in Bethesda, Maryland. It was the first stereo FM station to serve the Washington, D.C. market, and began operating with Taylor as station manager and program director in November 1961. Taylor was responsible for the station's day-to-day operations including programming the music and some announcing. WHFS played a mix of classical, jazz, and pop.

In 1963, Taylor joined WDVR-FM in Philadelphia as station manager and program director and partnered with sales manager Jerry Lee. WDVR was another newly-formed station without a set plan for programming. Taylor developed the new station's sound, which updated the easy listening format and later became known as "beautiful music." Taylor's format called for instrumental versions of popular songs with light classical melodies and some solo vocals with arrangements by composers and bandleaders like Percy Faith, Mantovani, Ray Conniff, and Bert Kaempfert. It also minimized announcer comments and advertising breaks. The station launched with that format on May 13, 1963 and became Philadelphia's first 24-hour music outlet. Initially, the station did not air news segments, but Taylor later introduced pre-recorded weather and news summaries that aired every three hours. He eventually added live, local announcers to allow for breaking news reports, such as during the assassination of President John F. Kennedy in November 1963. In 1966, when the American Research Bureau (ARB) published the first Arbitron ratings, WDVR had the highest average listenership of any FM station in the nation.

After leaving WDVR in 1966, Taylor had management stints at two radio stations before taking a position as program and music director at WJIB-FM in Boston in 1967. A new joint venture between Kaiser Broadcasting and The Boston Globe, WJIB sought to incorporate a format similar to the one developed by Taylor at WDVR. He later had a role in supervising Kaiser's sister station, KFOG-FM, in San Francisco. At WJIB, Taylor launched the roll out of his beautiful music programming in the fall of 1967. By early 1968, the station was rated seventh in the market according to the Hooper Radio Audience Index.

=== 1968–1977: Success with WRFM and Bonneville syndication ===
After eight months at WJIB, Taylor returned to WDVR in May 1968 in the roles of operations manager and program director. That year, WDVR became the first FM station to bill $1 million in a calendar year. Taylor then wrote letters to a number of broadcasters in major markets, informing them about his success with the beautiful music format. Arch L. Madsen, then president of the Bonneville International Corporation, received one of those letters and asked Taylor to become the station manager at Bonneville's low-ranked New York City affiliate, WRFM-FM. He took the job there in March 1969 and soon began implementing his beautiful music format.

Prior to Taylor's arrival in 1969, WRFM ranked 21st out of 36 New York area stations tracked in Arbitron ratings. By January 1970, the station was tied for fourth, and by the fall of that year, it ranked third behind two heritage AM stations (WABC and WOR). The format's success in the largest advertising market in the nation helped popularize beautiful music and make it a viable option for both station owners and prospective advertisers. In September 1970, Taylor was named vice president and FM program consultant with Bonneville International. In that role, he became responsible for the programming of all six Bonneville-owned FM stations. In addition to WRFM, these stations included KSEA-FM (Seattle), WCLR-FM (Chicago), KBIG-FM (Los Angeles), KSL-FM (Salt Lake City), and KMBR-FM (Kansas City).

Looking to expand the reach of the format even further, Bonneville and Taylor formed Bonneville Broadcast Consultants (BBC), a division of Bonneville International that syndicated Taylor's beautiful music format to stations across the country. Originally known as Bonneville Program Services until 1974, BBC got its start in early 1971 with Taylor as president. The syndicated programming was based on Taylor's WRFM concepts, and participating stations were sent a library of tape reels containing Taylor-produced, 15-minute segments of music, created from a collection of several thousand record albums. This "matched flow" format was aired either automated or played by live announcers, depending on a station's staffing ability. Taylor's format limited advertising to seven minutes per hour and also often called for news and community affairs segments that were three to four minutes in length. Taylor later developed the "random select" format which was based on customizable single cuts instead of prepackaged, "matched flow" segments. In addition to its music programming service, BBC offered clients guidance for on-air presentation, newscast production, and station marketing.

By April 1972, BBC had 19 subscribers throughout the country. Taylor's syndicated format continued seeing ratings success including for stations like KEEY-FM in Minneapolis and WEZO-FM in Rochester, New York, the latter of which was the most listened to FM station in its market in 1973. Other BBC stations that saw success in their markets included WMEF-FM in Fort Wayne, Indiana; WAIA-FM in Miami; and WRRN-FM in Warren, Pennsylvania among numerous others. In the spring of 1976, Taylor's flagship station, WRFM in New York, was the most listened to FM station in the United States with Bonneville's Los Angeles affiliate, KBIG, ranked fourth. That year, BBC introduced a new syndicated genre format with soft rock, although Taylor continued to focus on beautiful music programming. Other genre formats that BBC syndicated included both traditional and contemporary middle of the road music.

=== 1978–present: Final years with Bonneville and reemergence with XM ===
By 1978, BBC provided syndicated music to 127 client stations in the United States, 80 of which carried Taylor's beautiful music format. That format was also syndicated to stations in Canada and Australia. In order to keep up with changing tastes, Taylor began incorporating more solo vocals and contemporary artists into his beautiful music reels, including Neil Diamond and The Carpenters. Taylor continued bringing in client stations for BBC into the 1980s, including WDVR (then known as WEAZ-FM) in Philadelphia where he originally started programming beautiful music. The number of BBC subscriber stations reached a peak of around 180 in the early 1980s. Taylor remained at Bonneville until retiring in 1987.

After retirement, Taylor served as the music director for a syndicated beautiful music program called Special of the Week. He also began distributing beautiful music recordings via his Surrey House Music label. In 2000, Taylor returned to radio programming with XM Satellite Radio. He initially served as the program director for the company's 1940s big band station (now known as '40s Junction). He also developed programming for the beautiful music-themed station, Escape, and the southern gospel-focused channel, enLighten. All three of these channels survived the merger between Sirius and XM in 2008. Taylor retired from SiriusXM in August 2015. In 2018, he released his autobiography, Radio...My Love, My Passion, which details his life and career, including the development of the beautiful music format. He was inducted into the Broadcast Pioneers of Philadelphia Hall of Fame in 2015 and the Southern Gospel Music Hall of Fame in 2021.

== Personal life ==
Taylor married Alicia Blood in 1975 and remained with her until her death in 2019. He has three children from a previous marriage, Scott, Linda, and Patricia. He currently resides in Doylestown, Pennsylvania.

== Bibliography ==
Year	Title	Original publisher	ISBN	Notes
2018	Radio...My Love, My Passion	Mascot Books	ISBN 9781684015924	Autobiography
