= Crime harm index =

Crime rates measurement

A crime harm index is a measurement of crime rates in which crimes are weighted based on how much "harm" they cause.

The most simple and most common method of measuring an area's crime rate is to count the number of crimes. In this case, one minor crime (e.g. a shoplifting incident) counts for the same as a single very serious crime (e.g. murder). Leading criminologists have argued in favour of creating a weighted measurement. Lawrence W. Sherman and two other researchers wrote in 2016 that "All crimes are not created equal. Counting them as if they are fosters distortion of risk assessments, resource allocation, and accountability."

Most crime harm indices use prison sentencing policies to decide what the "harm score" of an offence should be. The harm score of an offence is the default length of the prison sentence that an offender would receive, if the crime was committed by a single offender.

== Cambridge Crime Harm Index ==
The Cambridge Crime Harm Index (CCHI) was unveiled in 2016. It was developed by Lawrence W. Sherman, Peter Neyroud and Eleanor Neyroud. It uses sentencing guidelines of England and Wales to calculate the harm score of each crime. The system has already been adopted by several UK police forces. According to the CCHI, the harm score for a crime is the default prison sentence that an offender would receive for committing it, if the crime was committed by a single offender with no prior convictions. For minor crimes that would instead result in a fine, the harm score is the number of days it would take someone with a minimum wage job to earn the money to pay the fine.

The Cambridge Crime Harm Index has inspired other crime harm indices for New Zealand, Denmark and Western Australia. It has also been evaluated for use in Scotland, though officers of Police Scotland have noted that it does not reflect Scottish sentencing guidelines.
