= David P. Farrington =

British criminologist (1944–2024)

David Farrington
- Born: 7 March 1944; Ormskirk, Lancashire, England
- Died: 5 November 2024 (aged 80)
- Education: University of Cambridge
- Spouse: Sally Chamberlain (m. 1966)
- Children: 3
- Awards: Officer of the Order of the British Empire (2003); Stockholm Prize in Criminology (2013)
- Scientific career
- Fields: Criminology, psychology
- Workplaces: University of Cambridge
- Thesis: Continuity and discontinuity in verbal learning (1970)

David Philip Farrington, OBE (7 March 1944 – 5 November 2024) was a British criminologist, forensic psychologist, and emeritus professor of psychological criminology at the University of Cambridge, where he was also a Leverhulme Trust Emeritus Fellow. In 2014, Paul Hawkins and Bitna Kim wrote that Farrington "is considered one of the leading psychologists and main contributors to the field of criminology in recent years."

== Early life and education ==
Farrington was born in Ormskirk, England on 7 March 1944, the youngest son of William and Gladys Farrington. He was educated at Ormskirk Grammar School and later at Cambridge, where he received his BA, MA, and PhD in psychology.

== Career ==
In 1969, Farrington became a research officer in criminology at the University of Cambridge, where he became assistant director of research in criminology in 1974 and a university lecturer in criminology in 1976. In 1992, he became a professor of psychological criminology at the University of Cambridge. From 1971 to 2000, he taught seminars and supervised undergraduate law students taking classes in crime prevention and the psychological aspects of crime, among other subjects. He was the director of the senior criminology course for criminal justice professionals at Cambridge from 1975 to 1978, and again from 1983 to 2004. From 1998 to 2016, he was an adjunct professor of psychiatry at the University of Pittsburgh's Western Psychiatric Institute and Clinic.

== Research ==
Farrington was known for his research on the development of criminal behaviour throughout the life course; notably, he collaborated on the Cambridge Study in Delinquent Development with the study's original director, Donald J. West. This study followed 411 London boys born just before and after 1953, and was conducted over 24 years. He also published studies comparing crime rates and the probability of imprisonment given conviction of a crime in the United Kingdom and the United States. He was also known for his work on evaluating the effectiveness of interventions intended to prevent crime, such as closed-circuit televisions.

Farrington also published on a number of related topics within the field of criminology, including crime and physical health; bullying; and offender profiling. He authored eight systematic reviews for the Campbell Collaboration.

== Death ==
Farrington died on 5 November 2024, at the age of 80.

== Honours and awards ==
In 2003, Farrington received an Order of the British Empire (OBE) for his services to criminology. In 2013, Farrington received the Stockholm Prize in Criminology for his work on early-life crime prevention programs. He also received the Thorsten Sellin-Sheldon and Eleanor Glueck Award and the August Vollmer Award from the American Society of Criminology, the European Association of Psychology and Law's Award for Outstanding Career-Long Contributions to the Scientific Study of Law and Human Behaviour, the Joan McCord Award from the Academy of Experimental Criminology, and the Jerry Lee Award from the American Society of Criminology Division of Experimental Criminology.

== Professional affiliations ==
Farrington was president of the American Society of Criminology (1998–1999), the European Association of Psychology and Law (1997–1999), the British Society of Criminology (1990–1993), and the Academy of Experimental Criminology (2001–2003). In 1975, he became a member of the British Society of Criminology, and in 1999, he became a member of the Academy of Experimental Criminology. He was also a former member of the Academy of Criminal Justice Sciences (2004–2010) and International Society of Criminology (1998–2009). From 2015 to 2016, he was the chair of the American Society of Criminology's Division of Developmental and Life-Course Criminology.

== Selected works ==
=== Articles ===
- Farrington, David P. (1986). "Age and crime". Crime and Justice. 7: 189–250. doi:10.1086/449114. ISSN 0192-3234. S2CID 144772884.
- Farrington, David P. (1989). "Early predictors of adolescent aggression and adult violence". Violence and Victims. 4 (2): 79–100. doi:10.1891/0886-6708.4.2.79. ISSN 0886-6708. PMID 2487131. S2CID 1880841.
- Farrington, David P. (1993). "Understanding and preventing bullying". Crime and Justice. 17: 381–458. doi:10.1086/449217. ISSN 0192-3234. S2CID 144415152.
- Farrington, David P. (1995). "The development of offending and antisocial behaviour from childhood: key findings from the Cambridge Study in Delinquent Development". Journal of Child Psychology and Psychiatry. 36 (6): 929–964. doi:10.1111/j.1469-7610.1995.tb01342.x. ISSN 0021-9630. PMID 7593403.
- Loeber, Rolf; Farrington, David P. (2000). "Young children who commit crime: Epidemiology, developmental origins, risk factors, early interventions, and policy implications". Development and Psychopathology. 12 (4): 737–762. doi:10.1017/S0954579400004107. ISSN 0954-5794. PMID 11202042. S2CID 20506392.
- Jolliffe, Darrick; Farrington, David P. (2006). "Development and validation of the Basic Empathy Scale". Journal of Adolescence. 29 (4): 589–611. doi:10.1016/j.adolescence.2005.08.010. PMID 16198409.
- Ttofi, Maria M.; Farrington, David P. (2010). "Effectiveness of school-based programs to reduce bullying: a systematic and meta-analytic review". Journal of Experimental Criminology. 7 (1): 27–56. doi:10.1007/s11292-010-9109-1. ISSN 1573-3750. S2CID 5433291.

=== Books ===
- West, Donald James; Farrington, David P. (1973). Who Becomes Delinquent? Second Report of the Cambridge Study in Delinquent Development. London: Heinemann. ISBN 0-435-82937-8. OCLC 815962.
- Farrington, David P.; Ohlin, Lloyd E.; Wilson, James Q. (1986). Understanding and Controlling Crime : Toward a New Research Strategy. New York, NY: Springer. ISBN 978-1-4612-4940-5. OCLC 852792490.
- Farrington, David P. Hollin, Clive R. McMurran, Mary. (2001). Sex and violence : the psychology of crime and risk assessment. Routledge. ISBN 978-0-415-26890-5. OCLC 48677690.
- Farrington, David P.; Welsh, Brandon C. (2007). Saving Children from a Life of Crime: Early Risk Factors and Effective Interventions. New York, NY: Oxford University Press. ISBN 978-0-19-537899-3. OCLC 1086243971.
- Baldry, Anna Costanza; Blaya, Catherine; Farrington, David P. (2018). International Perspectives on Cyberbullying: Prevalence, Risk Factors and Interventions. London: Palgrave Macmillan. ISBN 978-3-319-73263-3. OCLC 1035389960.
- Farrington, David P.; Kazemian, Lila; Piquero, Alexis Russell (2018). The Oxford Handbook of Developmental and Life-Course Criminology. New York, NY: Oxford University Press. ISBN 978-0-19-020137-1. OCLC 1028581337.
