= Police reform in the United States =

Ongoing political movement in the United States concerning law enforcement

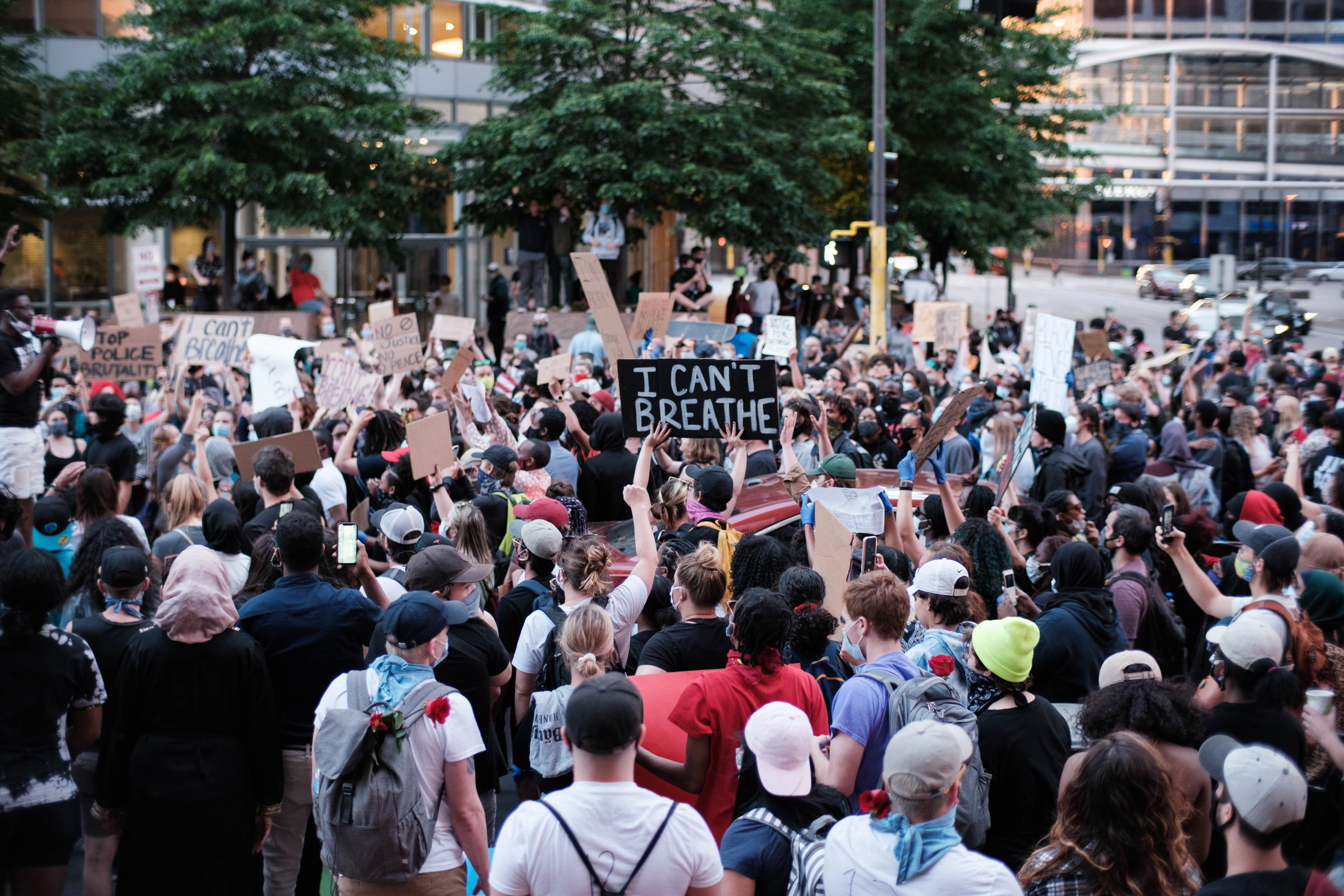
A George Floyd protest in Minneapolis, Minnesota on May 28, 2020

Police reform in the United States is an ongoing political movement that seeks to reform systems of law enforcement throughout the United States. Many goals of the police reform movement center on police accountability. Specific goals may include: lowering the criminal intent standard, limiting or abolishing qualified immunity for law enforcement officers, sensitivity training, conflict prevention and mediation training, updating legal frameworks, and granting administrative subpoena power to the U.S. Department of Justice for "pattern or practice" investigations into police misconduct and police brutality.

As of May 2023, no updated federal police reform legislation has fully passed the United States Congress. The most recent bill, the George Floyd Justice in Policing Act of 2021, was introduced by then-California Representative Karen Bass in the 117th Congress in response to the murder of George Floyd in May 2020. The bill passed the House of Representatives on March 3, 2021, and was received by the Senate six days later on March 9. The bill collapsed in September 2021 after failed bipartisan negotiations in the Senate.

The history of law enforcement in the United States includes many efforts at police reform. Early efforts at police reform often involved external commissions, such as the Wickersham Commission, that spelled out reforms but left to the police to implement them, often with limited success.

A series of U.S. Supreme Court decisions under the Warren Court led to important changes in policing, with respect to civil rights and constitutional law. Mapp v. Ohio in 1961 and Miranda v. Arizona in 1966 were two highly influential court decisions. Mapp v. Ohio found that evidence obtained in violation of the Fourth Amendment protection against "unreasonable searches and seizures" may not be used in criminal prosecutions. Miranda v. Arizona required that criminal suspects must be informed of their right to consult with an attorney and of their right against self-incrimination prior to questioning by police. These decisions began to set national standards for policing.

Special commissions, such as the Knapp Commission in New York City during the 1970s, have been used to bring about changes in law enforcement agencies. Civilian review boards (permanent external oversight agencies) have also been used as a means for improving police accountability. Civilian review boards tend to focus on individual complaints, rather than broader organizational issues that may result in long-term improvements. In addition to this, preemptive assessment evaluations can increase the potential of long-term improvement. The ability to identify police officers who are susceptible to behavioral issues and violence in high intensity situations can help leaders in law enforcement in being proactive against misconduct.

In response to instances of police brutality, the United States Commission on Civil Rights suggested in 1981 that police departments enforce early intervention programs. The goal of these programs is to spot potentially risky behaviors within police departments, and to take preventative action to reduce instances of police misconduct. Although not required, many police departments have opted to adopt early prevention programs. However, the methods used to identify problematic police officers were found to be inefficient. The identifiers used often flag officers that in reality pose a minimal threat, while those that would benefit from additional oversight fly under the radar. To offset this, police departments have been using an increased number of indicators to determine risk factors.

The 1994 Violent Crime Control and Law Enforcement Act authorized the United States Department of Justice's Civil Rights Division to bring civil ("pattern or practice") suits against local law enforcement agencies, to rein in abuses and hold them accountable. As a result, numerous departments have entered into consent decrees or memoranda of understanding, requiring them to make organizational reforms. This approach shifts the focus from individual officers to placing focus on police organizations.

Some law enforcement agencies in the United States in the early 2000s and 2010s began to emphasize de-escalation as a method of conflict resolution and obtaining voluntary compliance. There are also emphases on community policing to build relationships and community trust in law enforcement; the evidence-based policing approach of using of data to assist with decision-making; and the importance of civilian oversight of police work. Nonetheless, instances of misconduct and brutality have continued to occur. Many proposed reforms have been put forward following the murder of George Floyd.

== Early history ==
Some early attempts at police reform involved hiring police officers that reflected the community they were policing. This meant hiring white female police officers to deal with white women, and hiring African American policewomen to work with black women. Georgia Ann Robinson, the first black policewoman hired by the Los Angeles Police Department in 1919, was part of such early reform efforts. She often referred the people she came in contact with to social services, rather than arresting them.

Early efforts at police reform often involved external commissions, such as the Wickersham Commission, that spelled out reforms but left implementation to the police, often with limited success.

== 1960s: the Johnson Administration and the Warren Court ==
In the 1960s, President Lyndon Johnson created the President's Commission on Law Enforcement and Administration of Justice. The commission's final report, issued in 1967, has been described as "the most comprehensive evaluation of crime and crime control in the United States at the time". It laid out reorganization plans for police departments and suggested a range of reforms. Several of the commission's findings related to the poor treatment of juvenile offenders.

A series of U.S. Supreme Court decisions under the Warren Court led to important changes in policing, with respect to civil rights and constitutional law. Mapp v. Ohio in 1961 and Miranda v. Arizona in 1966 were two highly influential court decisions. Mapp v. Ohio found that evidence obtained in violation of the Fourth Amendment protection against "unreasonable searches and seizures" may not be used in criminal prosecutions. Miranda v. Arizona required that criminal suspects must be informed of their right to consult with an attorney and of their Fifth Amendment right against self-incrimination prior to questioning by police. These decisions began to set national standards for policing.

== 1970s and 1980s ==
Special commissions, such as the Knapp Commission in New York City during the 1970s, have been used to bring about changes in law enforcement agencies. Civilian review boards (permanent external oversight agencies) have also been used as a means for improving police accountability. Civilian review boards tend to focus on individual complaints, rather than broader organizational issues that may result in long-term improvements.

== 1990 to 2010 ==
The 1994 Violent Crime Control and Law Enforcement Act authorized the United States Department of Justice's Civil Rights Division to bring civil ("pattern or practice") suits against local law enforcement agencies, to rein in abuses and hold agencies accountable. As a result, numerous departments have entered into consent decrees or memoranda of understanding, requiring the agencies to make organizational reforms. This approach shifts focus from individual officers to police organizations.

The Department of Justice also has a component called the Community Relations Service. Over the years, the Community Relations Service (CRS) has helped police departments and communities all over the country come to grips with the difficult task of maintaining law and order in a complex and changing multicultural society. Frequently, these efforts have involved minority citizens' complaints about police behavior, use of force, and hate groups.

In a 2003 document titled Principles of Good Policing: Avoiding Violence Between Police and Citizens, the DOJ Community Relations Service outlines a two-level strategy for reducing potential for violence by police:

To reduce the potential for violence, police executives must inculcate the values articulated by policy and procedure into two levels of the police department: the administrative level and the "line" or operational level. To accomplish the task of value-transition on one level without doing so on the other is futile, for no change in police behavior will result. In addition to the two levels of the organization which the police executive must address, two dimensions of law enforcement must also be addressed: the police culture and various community cultures. Thus, to effect change in police-community violence, police executives must take a multidimensional approach. Traditional approaches to reform have been one-dimensional, and have met with little success.

== 2010 to present ==
Some law enforcement agencies in the United States in the early 2000s and 2010s began to emphasize de-escalation as a method of conflict resolution and obtaining voluntary compliance. There are also emphases on community policing to build relationships and community trust in law enforcement; the evidence-based policing approach of using of data to assist with decision-making; and the importance of civilian oversight of police work.

=== Police use of force and issues of race ===
In the 2010s, a series of shootings of unarmed individuals by police officers correlated with calls for police and law enforcement reform, especially regarding the diversity of police officers and the treatment of minorities by the criminal justice system.

In the specific case of the shooting of Michael Brown in Ferguson in August 2014, an investigation by the United States Department of Justice Civil Rights Division concluded that, while there were not sufficient grounds to charge the police officer who shot Brown with a criminal offense, the Ferguson Police Department as a whole "was routinely violating the constitutional rights of its black residents." Members of the Congressional Black Caucus indicated their appreciation of U.S. Attorney General Eric Holder, and said that while many American police officers serve honorably, the problems found in Ferguson such as the use of fines to generate revenue instead of promoting safety and justice, the use of excessive force, and unconstitutional practices may also be found in other communities in the United States.

President Barack Obama created the President's Task Force on 21st Century Policing. The commission issued a report on March 2, 2015, that made numerous recommendations. It did not call for all officers to wear body cameras, but did call for independent prosecutors to investigate civilian deaths in police custody or in officer-involved shootings.

Sue Rahr, while sheriff of King County, Washington, had introduced a new policing model called L.E.E.D. (Listen and Explain with Equity and Dignity) in 2011, which influenced her later work on the "guardian model" of training police candidates when she became the executive director of the Washington State Criminal Justice Training Commission; Obama appointed Rahr to the President's Task Force, where the "guardian model" received support as a desirable alternative to the "warrior model" of training officers. Rahr said in a U.S. House of Representatives Judiciary Committee hearing that, "When I talk about a guardian mindset... this is not a more kind and gentle way of doing the job. It's the opposite. We have increased firearms training and defensive tactics training, because we want to create strong, effective police officers who have the confidence that they don't [need] to behave in an intimidating manner. When someone has confidence, that helps deescalate as well. I think that when we were too focused on the boot camp method of training, it detracted away from our ability to train officers to be critical thinkers... What we have tried to shift towards is officer training, where you focus on critical thinking and confidence."

A spokesperson for the American Civil Liberties Union said that the ideas in the report of the President's Commission "will significantly improve the relationship between law enforcement and the communities they serve" and that "For us to see meaningful change, local authorities must first implement data collection systems to improve transparency, use of force policies that emphasize de-escalation, eradicate all forms of biased policing, and improve community engagement and oversight to provide accountability."

In response to the 2015 Baltimore protests, President Barack Obama said that "It's in [the interest of police officers] to root out [police] who aren't doing the right thing, to hold accountable people when they do something wrong, instead of just the closing-ranks approach that all too often we see that ends up just feeding greater frustration and ultimately, I think, putting more police officers in danger." Obama also said, "Unfortunately we've seen these police-related killings or deaths too often now, and obviously everybody is starting to recognize that this is not just an isolated incident in Ferguson or New York, but we've got some broader issues."

Police leaders responded on January 29, 2016, with "Use of Force: Taking Policing to a Higher Standard". According to The New York Times, the new guideline call for police to use higher standards for use of force than those set by the U.S. Supreme Court. "This is a defining moment for us in policing," said Charles Ramsey, the recently retired commissioner of the Philadelphia Police Department, according to The Washington Post.

On July 7, 2016, after police shootings of black individuals in St Paul, Minnesota and Baton Rouge, Louisiana, Obama said that "When incidents like this occur, there's a big chunk of our fellow citizenry that feels as if it's because of the color of their skin, they are not being treated the same... This is not just a black issue, not just a Hispanic issue. This is an American issue that we all should care about." That same day, at a protest in Dallas, Texas, an attacker shot and killed multiple officers. On July 17, multiple officers were shot and killed in Baton Rouge amid tensions after the shooting of Alton Sterling. Obama and Black Lives Matter leaders condemned the violence. Obama said, "We may not yet know the motives for this attack, but I want to be clear: there is no justification for violence against law enforcement. None. These attacks are the work of cowards who speak for no one. They right no wrongs. They advance no causes. The officers in Baton Rouge; the officers in Dallas – they were our fellow Americans, part of our community, part of our country, with people who loved and needed them, and who need us now – all of us – to be at our best."

=== Police use of force on mentally ill individuals ===
Another dimension of police work receiving scrutiny in the 2010s is the interactions between police officers and individuals with mental illness. "Twenty-five percent or more of people fatally shot by the police have had a mental disorder", according to various analyses. Experts in criminal justice say that funding for mental health services in many parts of the country is insufficient, therefore, police are likely to encounter mentally ill people. In response to negative reactions from the public and high-profile violent interactions between police and mentally ill individuals, some police departments are increasing their specialized training and changing their tactics for their interactions with mentally ill people. For example, all officers in Portland, Oregon receive 40 hours of "crisis intervention training". Officers in some departments may specialize in this type of work, similar to how other officers specialize in SWAT, narcotics, or K-9.

=== Reform of law enforcement agencies with other forms of misconduct ===
==== Oakland, California Police Department ====
The Oakland, California Police Department had three police chiefs in nine days amid revelations that some Oakland officers had shared inappropriate text messages and emails, that a police sergeant allowed his girlfriend to write his reports, and that there had been sexual misconduct among officers of multiple law enforcement agencies and at least one U.S. Department of Defense employee. Oakland's mayor, Libby Schaaf, said at a news conference, "I am here to run a police department, not a frat house," and that she wants "to root out what is clearly a toxic, macho culture." Peter Keane, a former San Francisco police commissioner and law professor at Golden Gate University, said, "I think she can find someone who is really ruthless about instituting reforms of these kinds of things" but "You can't do any of this stuff with an internal candidate."

==== Los Angeles County Jails and Sheriff's Department ====
On June 27, 2016, a federal judge sentenced Paul Tanaka, a former second-in-command of the Los Angeles County Sheriff's Department, to five years in prison. The Court found him guilty of conspiracy and of obstructing an FBI investigation of abuses at the county jails. Judge Percy Anderson said, "Not only did [Tanaka] fail to identify and address problems in the jails, he exacerbated them." The Los Angeles Times reported that "Prosecutors accused him of overseeing a scheme in which underlings tried to intimidate the lead FBI agent on the inquiry, concealed the whereabouts of an inmate who was working as a federal informant and pressured deputies not to cooperate with the investigation".

=== Firings and resignations of police chiefs ===
Police chiefs of Chicago, San Francisco, Baltimore, and Oakland were fired or resigned in 2015 and 2016 after various controversies, often involving issues of race and allegations of use of excessive force by officers. Chicago's chief, Garry F. McCarthy, was fired after a judge ordered the city to make public a video of the murder of Laquan McDonald by a police officer, and after public criticism of the city's handling of the video. Baltimore's chief was fired after a citizen died in police custody in controversial circumstances, riots after the death, and amidst a crime surge.

=== Praise of the Dallas, Texas Police Department ===
After the 2016 shooting of multiple officers in Dallas, Texas during what had been a peaceful protest, there were reports in the media that the Dallas Police Department was one of the most progressive police departments in the country. Dallas Mayor Mike Rawlings said, "We did community policing before anybody, we had de-escalation training before anyone. We had this year the lowest number of police involved shootings than any major city in the country, and so it's very ironic that our police were protecting those that were exercising their freedom of speech and they lost their lives doing their jobs." Police Chief David Brown received widespread praise for his leadership in the aftermath of the shooting of his officers, although in the past he has faced criticism for the low pay of Dallas officers compared to neighboring jurisdictions. Brown addressed protesters in a speech, saying "Become a part of the solution. Serve your community, don't be a part of the problem. We're hiring. Get off that protest line and put an application in. And we'll put you in your neighborhood and we will help you resolve some of the problems you're protesting about." Job applications for the police department rose significantly in the days following the officers' shootings and Brown's statement, and the department received demonstrations of public appreciation.

=== Police reform after the murder of George Floyd ===
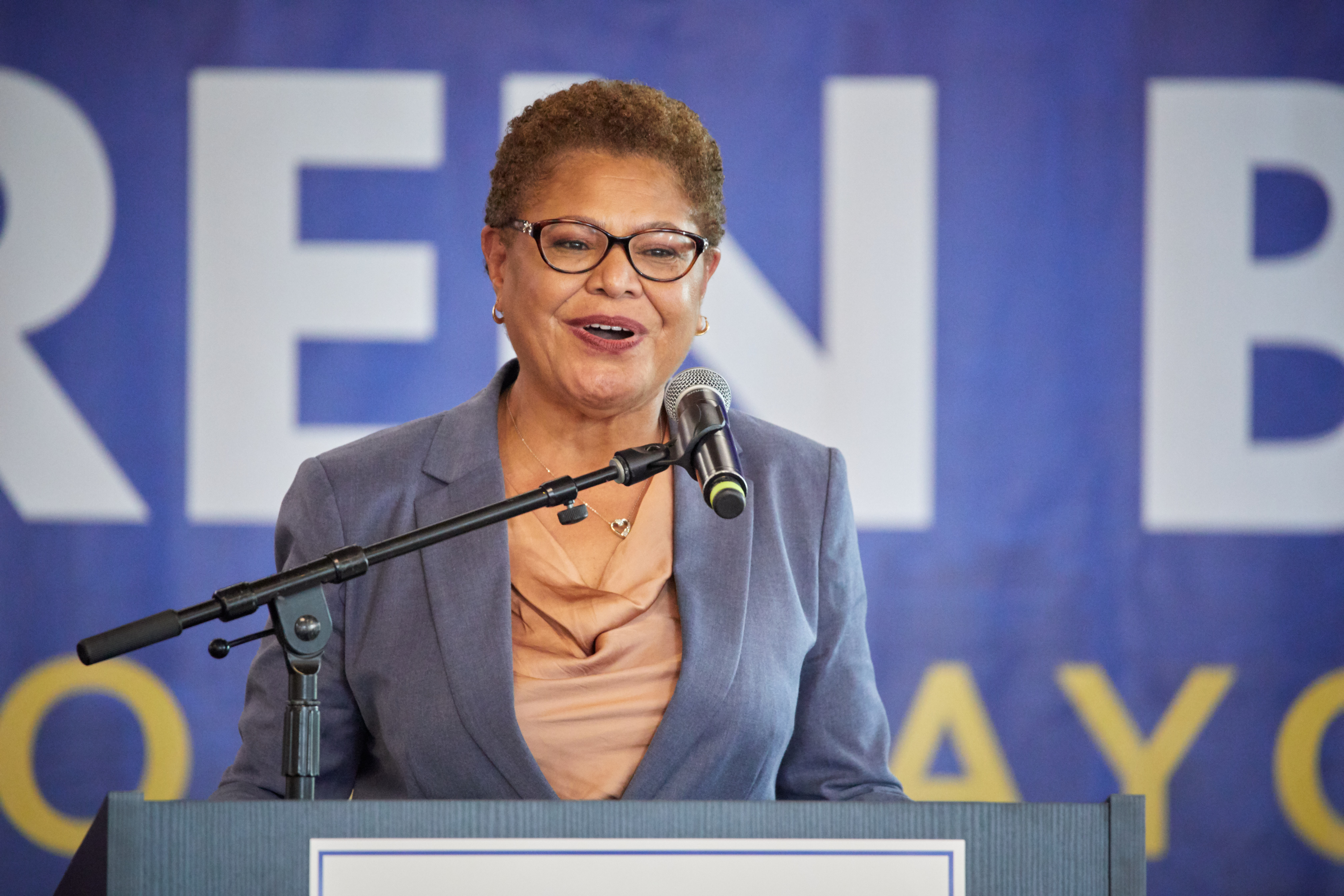
Former U.S. Representative for California's 33rd congressional district and current Los Angeles Mayor Karen Bass sponsored the George Floyd Justice in Policing Act of 2021.

After the murder of George Floyd, protesters began to call for "Defunding the Police". In the year after this event, multiple states, including Massachusetts and Colorado passed bipartisan measures which significantly altered law enforcement practices.

At the national level, both House Democrats and Senate Republicans proposed separate pieces of new legislation which would enact similar changes federally. The George Floyd Justice in Policing Act sought to establish new requirements for federal law enforcement on both the use of deadly force and less lethal force. It also encourages state and local adoption of consistent laws. Specifically, the law states that officers charged with murder or manslaughter are restricted in claiming that the act was justified if their own negligence leading up to the incident resulted in the necessary use of such force. It was passed by the House in 2020 and 2021, but both times Republican opposition was able to use the Senate filibuster to prevent passage into law.

=== Opposition to use of force reform ===
Lexipol, a Texas-based public safety training and consulting company, has opposed efforts to reform use of force standards. Lexipol declines to include common reform proposals in its manuals, such as a use-of-force continuum, de-escalation policies, or rules prohibiting chokeholds or shooting into cars, and advocates against measures it perceives would undermine police officers' discretion to use force. Because Lexipol contracts with over 3,500 law enforcement agencies in 35 states, its influence on policing may prevent many agencies from adopting common reform proposals.

=== Cost of Police Misconduct Act ===
The Cost of Police Misconduct Act is a bill that has been previously introduced to Congress multiple times in both chambers. It seeks to create "a publicly accessible federal database that would track police misconduct allegations and settlements at both the state and federal levels".

==== Attempted Introductions ====
- H.R.8908 — 116th Congress (2019-2020) — Beyer, Donald S., Jr. [Rep.-D-VA-8] (Introduced 12/09/2020)
- H.R.1481 — 117th Congress (2021-2022) — Beyer, Donald S., Jr. [Rep.-D-VA-8] (Introduced 03/02/2021)
- H.R.5624 — 118th Congress (2023-2024) — Beyer, Donald S., Jr. [Rep.-D-VA-8] (Introduced 09/21/2023)
- H.R.7278 — 119th Congress (2025-2026) — Beyer, Donald S. [Rep.-D-VA-8] (Introduced 01/30/2026)
- S.540 — 117th Congress (2021-2022) — Kaine, Tim [Sen.-D-VA] (Introduced 03/02/2021)
- S.2883 — 118th Congress (2023-2024) — Kaine, Tim [Sen.-D-VA] (Introduced 09/21/2023)
- S.3731 — 119th Congress (2025-2026) — Kaine, Tim [Sen.-D-VA] (Introduced 01/29/2026)

== Gallery ==
A 67-page report issued in 2011 about a U.S. Department of Justice investigation of the Seattle Police Department

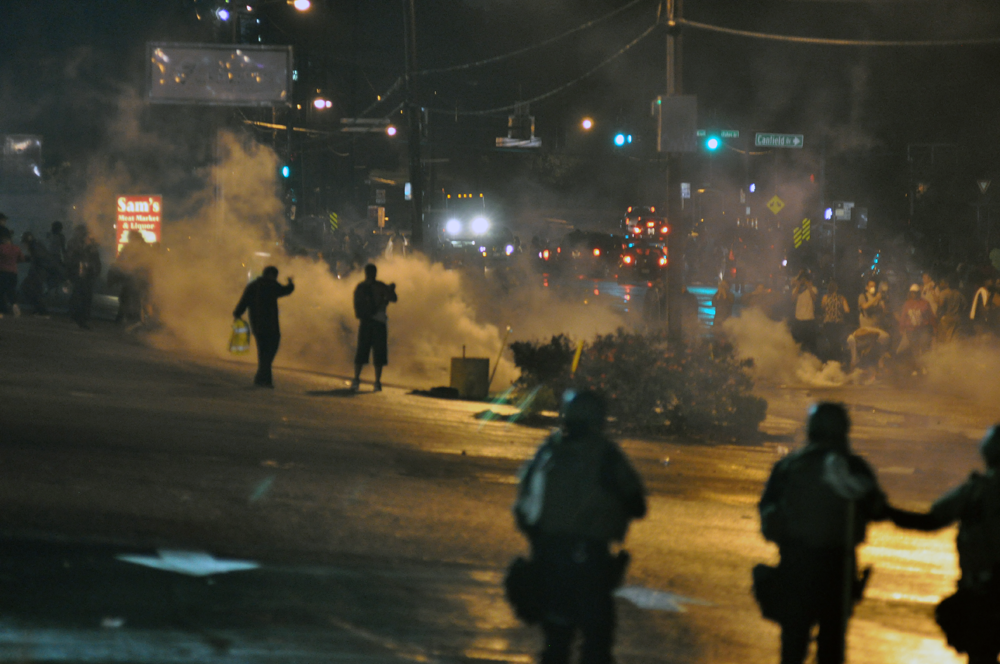
Police used tear gas during the Ferguson unrest in 2014.

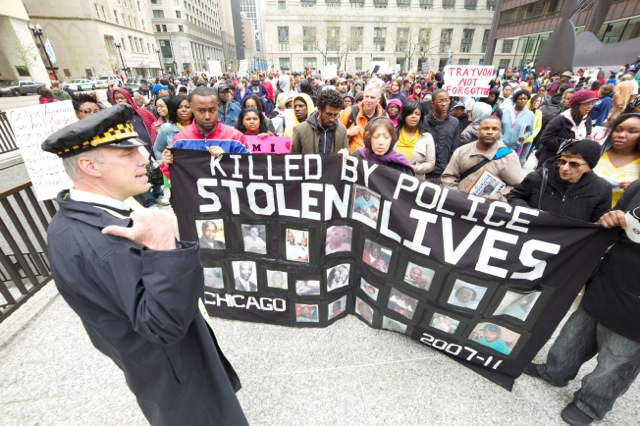
An Occupy Chicago protest in 2012

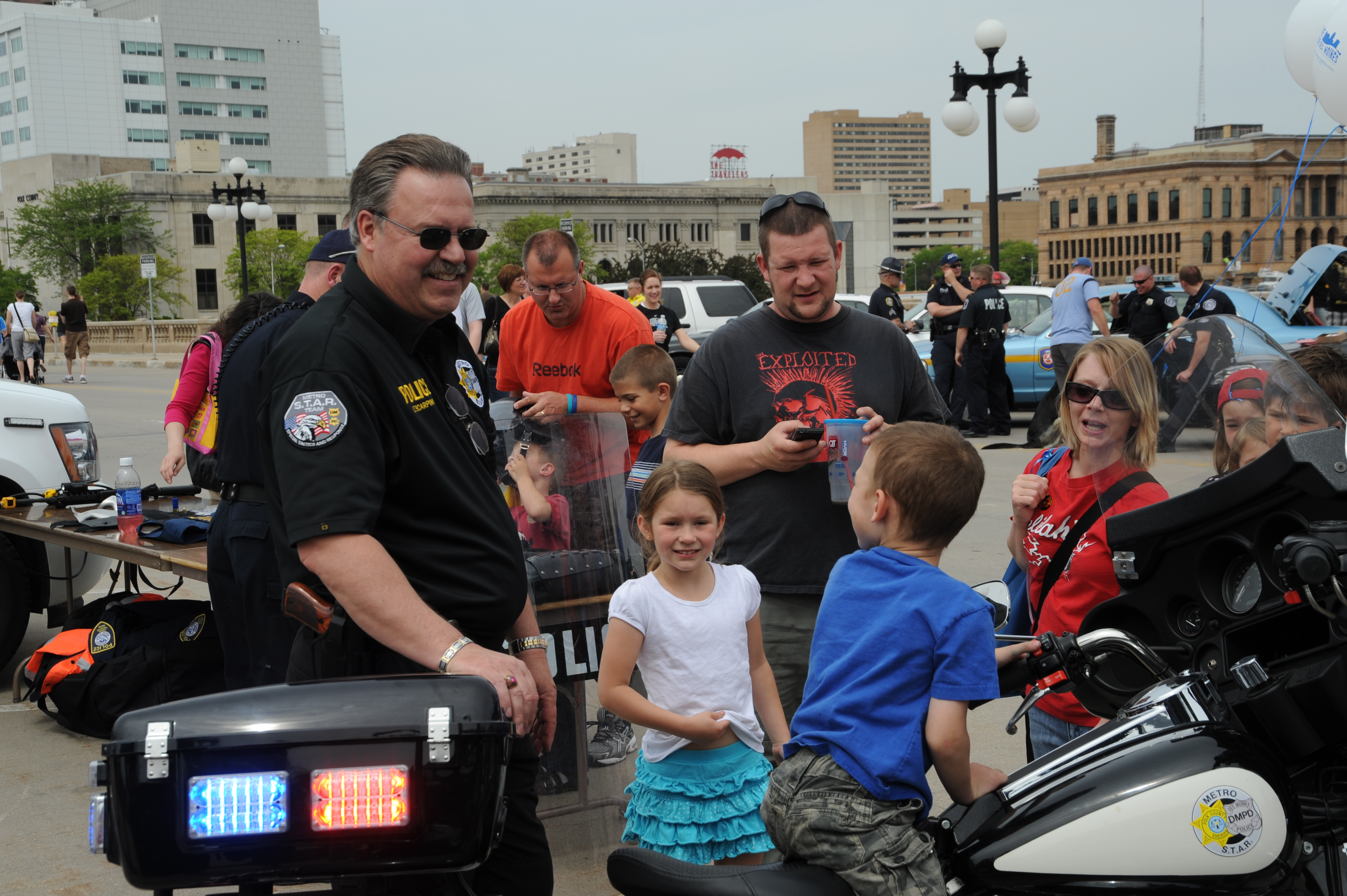
Community policing in action: officers interact with the public in Des Moines, Iowa during Police Week 2010

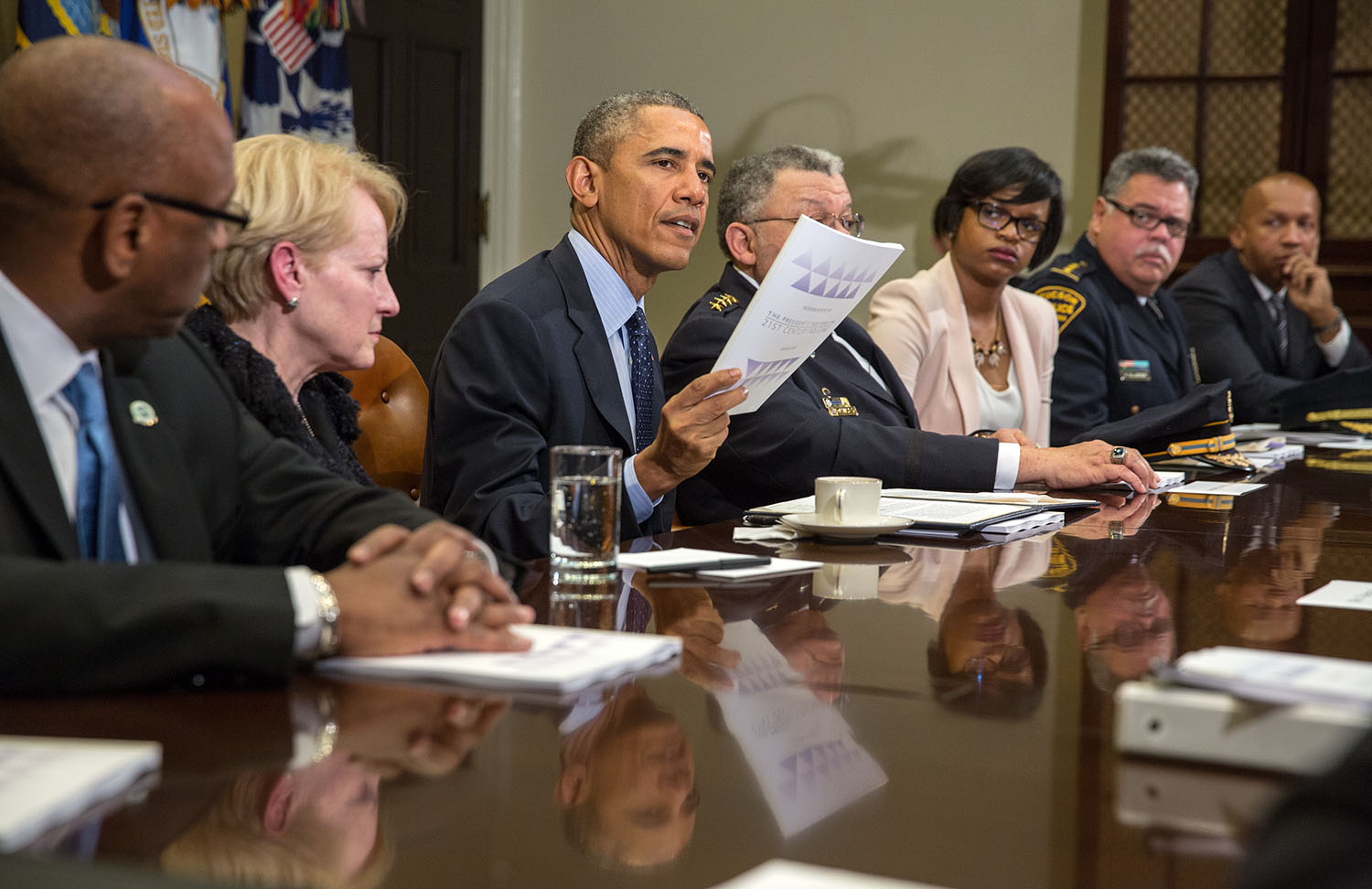
President Barack Obama and members of the President's Task Force on 21st Century Policing meet with the press on March 2, 2015, to discuss the interim report of the task force.

== See also ==
Policing issues

- Blue wall of silence
- Death in custody § United States
- Gypsy cop
- Militarization of police § United States
- Lists of killings by law enforcement officers in the United States
- Police perjury § United States
- Police accountability § United States
- Police brutality in the United States
- Police corruption § United States
- Police misconduct § United States
- Police riots in the United States
- Police use of deadly force in the United States
- Qualified immunity

Policing practices and powers

- Cavity search
- Civil asset forfeiture
- Perp walk
- Police body camera
- Stop-and-frisk
- Strip search

Types of policing

- Community policing
- Evidence-based policing
- Intelligence-led policing
- Peelian principles
- Predictive policing
- Preventive police
- Proactive policing
- Problem-oriented policing

General

- Criminal justice
- Law of the United States
- Prison reform
- Decarceration in the United States
- Electronic monitoring in the United States
