= WBEB =

Adult contemporary radio station in Philadelphia

- Philadelphia, Pennsylvania; United States
- Broadcast area: Philadelphia metropolitan area
- Frequency: 101.1 MHz (HD Radio)
- Branding: Philly's B101

Programming
- Language: English
- Format: Adult contemporary
- Subchannels: HD2: The Bet (sports gambling)

Ownership
- Owner: Audacy, Inc.; (Audacy License, LLC)
- Sister stations: KYW, WIP-FM, WOGL, WPHI-FM, WPHT, WTDY-FM

History
- First air date: May 13, 1963 (as WDVR)
- Former call signs: WDVR (1963–81); WEAZ (1981–89); WEAZ-FM (1989–93)

Technical information
- Licensing authority: FCC
- Facility ID: 71382
- Class: B
- ERP: 14,000 watts
- HAAT: 287 meters (942 ft)
- Transmitter coordinates: 40°2′19.4″N 75°14′12.6″W

Links
- Public license information: Public file; LMS
- Webcast: Listen live (via Audacy); Listen live (via Audacy) (HD2)
- Website: www.audacy.com/b101philly

WBEB (101.1 FM) is a commercial radio station licensed to serve Philadelphia, Pennsylvania. Owned by Audacy, Inc., the station broadcasts an adult contemporary format, switching to Christmas music for part of November and December.

The broadcast tower used by the station is in the Roxborough section of Philadelphia at (40°2′19.7″N 75°14′12.8″W), The radio studios are co-located within Audacy's corporate headquarters in Center City, Philadelphia. In addition to a standard analog transmission, WBEB broadcasts over two HD Radio channels, and is available online via Audacy.

== History ==
On May 13, 1963, the station first signed on using the call sign WDVR, which stood for Delaware Valley Radio. The station was launched with David Kurtz as owner, Jerry Lee as sales manager, and Marlin Taylor as station manager and program director. Taylor developed a custom programming format that called for instrumental versions of popular songs and would come to be known as beautiful music. It was one of several Philadelphia stations airing a beautiful music format, including WPBS (98.9 FM) and WWSH (106.1 FM). In 1981, it switched call signs to WEAZ, which stood for easy listening. It began using the slogan EAZY 101 with actor Patrick O'Neal and later with actor Robert Urich as its TV commercial spokesperson. By 1984, EAZY 101 had become the number one rated station in Philadelphia.

The station was known for playing pop tunes reworked in the form of instrumentals. At first, it played two vocalists per hour, although over time, more vocals were added. The instrumental music was based on the works of such artists as Frank Sinatra, Tony Bennett, Nat King Cole, Neil Diamond, The Carpenters as well as songs from movies and Broadway. By the 1980s, the station increased the number of vocals to four per hour, either from the middle of the road format or from the soft adult contemporary format.

In 1988, the station completed a transition from instrumental-based easy listening to an all-vocal soft adult contemporary format. This format change came after research showed listeners who grew up after the advent of rock and roll did not like instrumental music. With the format change, the station used a satellite-delivered music service, but by the next year, some of the air staff returned. By 1990, the station's name was shortened to "EZ 101". The station would shift to a mainstream adult contemporary format in 1993, and its call sign and branding would change to WBEB, B101.1, on April 25 of that year. 7 years later, they would shorten their name to B101.

In December 2013, WBEB announced the station would rebrand as More FM beginning December 26, with no change in format. The station argued that the B101 name was dated and did not reflect its current on-air content.

On July 19, 2018, Entercom announced that it would acquire WBEB for $57.5 million. To comply with DOJ revenue limits, Entercom divested WXTU back to its previous owner Beasley Broadcast Group. WBEB was, at that time, one of the last major-market radio stations to be independently owned. The sale closed September 28, 2018. With the sale's closure, former GM Blaise Howard returned to the station, this time as general sales manager.

On November 8, 2018, WBEB returned to its previous "B" branding as B101.1. It was later re-shortened to B101 in the summer of 2023.

== Ratings ==
Prior to 2018, WBEB was co-founded and owned by broadcaster Jerry Lee, and was recognized as one of the last independently owned and operated major market FM stations remaining in the United States. WBEB has been a top-ranking station in the Philadelphia Nielsen Audio ratings since the early 1990s; this dominance has been further demonstrated during the holiday season, where WBEB has historically seen the largest ratings gains among U.S. radio stations that switch to Christmas music. Even after Christmas Day, B101 continues to play the holiday format until New Year’s Eve as part of their “Christmas Bonus” contest.

== Signal note ==
WBEB is short-spaced to three other Class B stations:

WCBS-FM in New York City (a sister station) and WWDC in Washington, D.C. also operate on 101.1 MHz. The distance between WBEB's transmitter and WCBS-FM's transmitter is 82 miles, while the distance between WBEB's transmitter and WWDC's transmitter is 121 miles, as determined by FCC rules. The minimum distance between two Class B stations operating on the same channel according to current FCC rules is 150 miles.

In addition, WBEB is short-spaced to WROZ in Lancaster, Pennsylvania, as they operate on first adjacent channels (101.1 and 101.3) and the distance between the stations' transmitters is 73 miles as determined by FCC rules. The minimum distance between two Class B stations operating on first adjacent channels according to current FCC rules is 105 miles.
