= Minneapolis Domestic Violence Experiment =

Research on police responses to domestic violence calls in Minneapolis, Minnesota

The Minneapolis Domestic Violence Experiment (MDVE) evaluated the effectiveness of various police responses to domestic violence calls in Minneapolis, Minnesota. This experiment was implemented during 1981-82 by Lawrence W. Sherman, Director of Research at the Police Foundation, and by the Minneapolis Police Department with funding support from the National Institute of Justice. Among a pool of domestic violence offenders for whom there was probable cause to make an arrest, the study design called for officers to randomly select one third of the offenders for arrest, one third would be counseled and one third would be separated from their domestic partner.

The results of the study, showing a deterrent effect for arrest, had a "virtually unprecedented impact in changing then-current police practices." Subsequently, numerous states and law enforcement agencies enacted policies for mandatory arrest, without warrant, for domestic violence cases in which the responding police officer had probable cause that a crime had occurred.

== Background ==
Domestic violence historically has been viewed as a private family matter that need not involve government or criminal justice intervention. Before the early 1970s, police in the United States favored a "hands-off" approach to domestic violence calls, with arrest only used as a last resort. At the time, domestic violence cases were typically classified as misdemeanor assault cases. During the 1970s, many U.S. jurisdictions did not authorize the police to make arrests in any misdemeanor assault, whether it involved a domestic partner or not, unless the assault occurred in the officer's presence. A 1978 court order in New York City mandated that arrests only be made in cases of serious violence, thus officers instead made effort to mediate family disputes.

In the early 1970s, clinical psychologists argued that police should make an effort to mediate disputes.

Statistics on incidence of domestic violence, published in the late 1970s, helped raise public awareness of the problem and increase activism. A study published in 1976 by the Police Foundation found that the police had intervened at least once in the previous two years in 85 percent of spouse homicides. In the late 1970s and early 1980s, feminists and battered women's advocacy groups were calling on police to take domestic violence more seriously and change intervention strategies. In some instances, these groups took legal action against police departments, including in Oakland, California and New York City, to get them to make arrests in domestic violence cases. They claimed that police assigned low priority to domestic disturbance calls.

In 1978, the National Academy of Sciences published a report, Deterrence and Incapacitation: Estimating the Effects of Criminal Sanctions on Crime Rates, which called for more rigorous assessments of policies and practices based on social control theories and use of deterrence for crime control. Based on the academy's recommendations, the National Institute of Justice began funding studies of the deterrent effects of criminal sanctions and, in 1980, one of the sponsored studies was the Minneapolis Domestic Violence Experiment.

== The study ==
=== Methodology ===
The Minneapolis Domestic Violence Experiment looked at effectiveness of methods used by police to reduce domestic violence. Cases used in the study were misdemeanor assault calls, which make up the bulk of domestic violence calls for service. Both the victim and offender needed to still be present when the police arrived, in order to be included in the study.

51 patrol officers in the Minneapolis Police Department participated in the study. Each was asked to use one of three approaches for handling domestic violence calls, in cases where officers had probable cause to believe an assault had occurred:

1. Send the abuser away for eight hours.
2. Advice and mediation of disputes.
3. Make an arrest.

Interviews were conducted during a 6-month follow-up period, with both victims and offenders, as well as official records consulted to determine whether or not re-offending had occurred. The study lasted approximately 17 months and included 330 cases.

=== Findings ===
Arrest was found to be the most effective police response. The study found that the offenders assigned to be arrested had lower rates of re-offending than offenders assigned to counseling or temporarily sent away. (19% for arrest, 37% for advice and 34% for Send)

== Policy response ==
The results of the study received a great deal of attention from the news media, including The New York Times and prime-time news coverage on television. Many U.S. police departments responded to the study, adopting a mandatory arrest policy for spousal violence cases with probable cause. New York City Police Department Commissioner Benjamin Ward quickly issued a new mandate for officers to make arrests, after reading the results of the study in a Police Foundation report. Ward stated his belief that "arresting violent members of a household would be more effective in protecting other family members and help safeguard police officers called in to stop the highly charged quarrels. I thought it was about time to put policemen out of the counseling business and into what they really are best at, which is making arrests, then let the judge decide." With this mandate, Ward also included cohabitants and same-sex couples in the police definition of family. The Houston and Dallas Police Departments were also quick to change their approach to domestic disturbance calls, and make more arrests. Within a year, the number of police departments using arrest as a strategy in domestic violence cases jumped from 10 to 31%, and to 46% by 1986. Numerous other police departments had partially changed their approach to domestic violence cases.

In 1984, the U.S. Attorney General's Task Force on Family Violence report drew heavily upon the Minneapolis study, in recommending that domestic violence be handled with a criminal justice approach. Within eight years, 15 states and the District of Columbia enacted new domestic violence laws that required the arrest of violent domestic offenders. By 2005, 23 states and the District of Columbia had enacted mandatory arrest for domestic assault, without warrant, given that the officer has probable cause and regardless of whether or not the officer witnessed the crime. The Minneapolis study also influenced policy in other countries, including New Zealand, which adopted a pro-arrest policy for domestic violence cases.

== Mandatory arrest policies ==
Mandatory arrest laws were implemented in the U.S. during the 1980s and 1990s due, in great part, to the impact of the Minneapolis Experiment. The Violence Against Women Act of 1994 added to the volume of legislation in the 1990s pertaining to mandatory arrest laws, affecting those states that lacked such laws themselves. The laws "require the police to make arrests in domestic violence cases when there was probable cause to do so, regardless of the wishes of the victim." Before the laws were put into effect, police officers were required to witness the abuse occurring first hand prior to making an arrest. Currently, 23 states use mandatory arrest policies. Other states leave the decision to arrest to the discretion of the responding officers.

=== History of mandatory arrest policy in the U.S. ===
Prior to the implementation of mandatory arrest policies in the United States, police often were not able to arrest individuals suspected of domestic violence. In an article from the California Law Review titled "Domestic Violence as a Crime Against the State," Machaela Hoctor explained that "when officers did respond to a domestic violence call, they usually attempted to mediate the dispute. This "mediation" consisted of a variety of approaches, including attempts by officers to convince the parties to reconcile immediately at the scene or to use formal alternative dispute resolution programs." The debate over mandatory arrest is still underway, as many people believe it has negative effects on the assailant, victim, and their family members including but not limited to the breakdown of the family, the economic deprivation of the victim, the trauma associated with separation of families, and the lack of childcare in situations of dual arrest. Sometimes when police respond, they arrest both parties involved in a domestic violence situation. As described by Margaret Martin in the Journal of Family Violence, "The practice of dual arrest, the arrest of two parties, usually a man and a woman engaged in a 'domestic dispute,' has arisen in localities which employ presumptive and mandatory arrest". Police are more likely to arrest both parties if the primary aggressor is female However, not every domestic violence situation results in dual arrest. Police Officers are trained to deduce who the primary aggressor is in a domestic violence dispute, leading to the arrest of the assailant and not the victim.

=== Circumstances for arrest ===
Some states will arrest simply based on probable cause to believe an act of domestic violence has been committed, while others do not allow for an arrest after a specific amount of time following the incident. For example, in Alaska the police cannot make an arrest if the abuse occurred more than 12 hours prior to notification Police are specifically trained to assess the situation and decide whether they have the required probable cause to make an arrest. For instance, Wisconsin has a list of requirements that must be met before an officer can arrest a suspect. These include the age of the suspect(s), their relationship to the victim(s), and whether the act could be considered an intentional assault. The officer must also be able to identify the "predominant aggressor"

=== Modern arrests ===
Research has consistently reported an increase in the use of arrest for domestic violence in the United States. One large (but not necessarily representative) study of over 650,000 incidents drawn from 2,819 jurisdictions in 19 states during the year 2000 found that in the 197,064 incidents when victims and offenders were intimate partners, police made one or more arrests in 48.0 percent of incidents, and dual arrests in 1.9 percent of incidents In regards to same-sex relationships, the arrest rates for domestic violence were the same as those for heterosexual couples. For all intimate partner relationships, offenders were more likely to be arrested if the incident of violence was a serious aggravated assault. The NIJ also reported that "arrest occurred more frequently in cases involving intimate partners if the offender was white" and "cases involving intimate partners and acquaintances were more likely to result in arrest if the offender was 21 or older". The increased use of arrest has led to concerns about increases in arrests of women or arrests of two or more persons (dual arrests) in the same incident.

== Criticism ==
The Minneapolis study was criticized for its methods and its conclusions. The follow-up period of six months may have been too short to capture the episodic and cyclical patterns that can occur with domestic violence. Also, Minneapolis may have been unusual, in that they kept arrestees overnight in jail, whereas in other jurisdictions arrestees might be sent home much quicker.

While the Minneapolis design had many methodological strengths, randomized experiments look at the average causal effects for the group as a whole. Conclusions may be made that apply to most individuals in the group, but not all individuals, with some possibly experiencing negative effects of the intervention. In some cases, arrest may provoke the abuser and increase the possibility of more retributive violence.

The Minneapolis Experiment was based on deterrence theory, which includes the assumption that the offender is making rational decisions. In the case of domestic violence (and many other offenses), offenders often show little rational behavior. In addition, the Minneapolis Experiment did not measure whether being arrested increased the offenders' fear of future sanctions, a crucial element in deterrence theory.

== Replication ==
Beginning in 1986, the National Institute of Justice sponsored six replications of the Minneapolis Domestic Violence Experiment. While each site was an independent study, NIJ required that each study had to 1) use an experimental design (i.e., random assignment), 2) address domestic violence incidents that come to the attention of the police, 3) use arrest as one of the treatments, and 4) measure repeat offending using official police records and interviews with victims. The study sites included police departments in Omaha, Nebraska, Charlotte, North Carolina, Milwaukee, Wisconsin, Miami-Dade County, Florida, and Colorado Springs, Colorado. In Metro-Dade, 907 cases were used, compared to 1,200 cases in Milwaukee and over 1,600 cases in Colorado Springs. A study initiated in Atlanta was never completed. Although these five studies have been described as replications of the Minneapolis experiment, they each varied considerably from that study and from each other in methods and measures.

The initial findings from the five completed replications were reported independently beginning in 1990. The original authors' findings about the crime control effects of arrest varied depending upon the site studied, the measures of repeat offending used, and which alternative treatments were compared to arrest. Each replication reported multiple findings with some results favoring arrest, some showing no differences and some showing that arrest was associated with more repeat offending. None of the replications reported effects as strong as those reported for the Minneapolis Experiment.

Two articles synthesizing the findings from these studies report a crime control effect for the use of arrest for domestic violence. First, a meta-analysis of the published findings based on official police records from the Minneapolis and the SARP experiments reported a deterrent effect for arrest. Second, a re-analysis that applied consistent measures and methods to the archived data from the five replications reported that arrest was associated with as much as a 25% reduction in repeat offending and that those results were consistent across all five sites.
