= Thorsten Sellin =

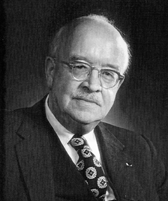
- Born: Johan Thorsten Sellin; 26 October 1896; Örnsköldsvik, Sweden
- Died: 17 September 1994 (aged 97); Gilmanton, New Hampshire, United States
- Scientific career
- Fields: Sociology; Criminology
- Workplaces: University of Pennsylvania

Signature
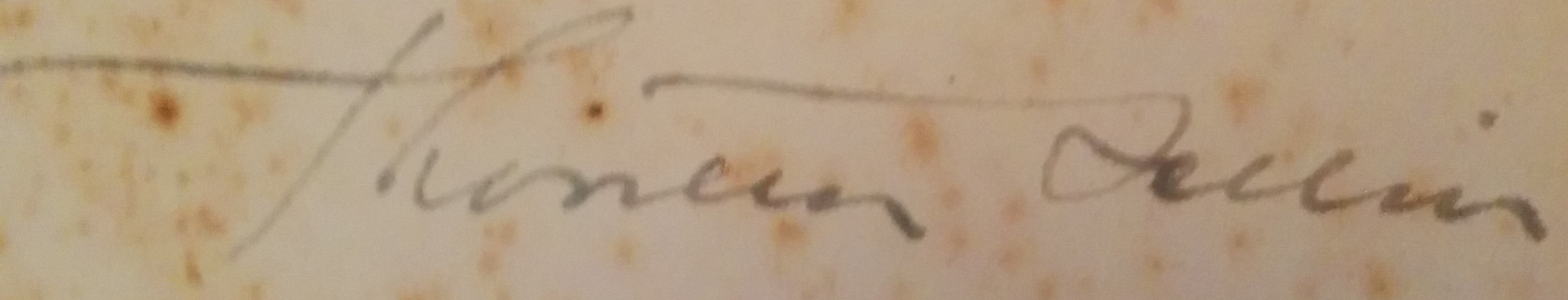

Johan Thorsten Sellin (26 October 1896 – 17 September 1994) was a Swedish American sociologist at the University of Pennsylvania, a penologist and one of the pioneers of scientific criminology.

== Biography ==
Sellin was born in Örnsköldsvik in Västernorrland County, Sweden and came to Canada with his parents when he was 17 years old. He received his bachelor's degree from Augustana College in Illinois when he was 19. He went on to receive a master's degree and doctoral degree in sociology from the University of Pennsylvania. He taught at the University of Pennsylvania from 1922 until becoming Professor Emeritus in 1967.

Dr. Sellin came to prominence in the 1920s and 30s for his studies in the use of criminal statistics at local, state, national and international levels. He later helped draft the U.S. Uniform Criminal Statistics Act in 1944. An expert on crime statistics, he advised the Federal Bureau of Investigation about statistical matters and was a consultant to the Bureau of the Census on criminal statistics. He also headed, or was a member of, various United Nations panels of experts on criminological questions. Dr. Sellin was a visiting professor or lecturer at Princeton, the University of California at Berkeley, Oxford and other universities.

Active in international groups, he was secretary-general of the Bern-based International Penal and Penitentiary Commission (later called the International Penal and Penitentiary Foundation) from 1949 to 1951. He was president of the International Society of Criminology from 1956 to 1965. Sellin edited the Annals of the American Academy of Political and Social Science for 39 years, from 1929 to 1968.

Dr. Sellin died in Gilmanton, New Hampshire at the age of 97.

== Legacy and honors ==
- Sellin received numerous honors, including the honorary doctorates of Leiden, Copenhagen and Brussels universities.
- Sellin was elected to the American Philosophical Society in 1949.
- The University of Pennsylvania Sellin Center for Studies in Criminology and Criminal Law is named for him.

== Selected works ==
- Research Memorandum on Crime in the Depression (1937)
- War and Crime: A research memorandum (1942)
- The Annals of the American Academy of Political and Social Science (1943)
- Some Current Issues in Penal Treatment (1950)
- The significance of records of crime (1951)
- The Protective Code: A Swedish Proposal (1957)
- The death penalty: A report for the Model penal code project of the American Law Institute (1959)
- Constructing an index of delinquency: A manual (1963)
- Systems of reporting "crimes known to the police" in selected foreign countries (1967)
- The Criminality of Youth (1975)

== Sources ==
- Wolfgang, Marvin E. (1968) "Thorsten Sellin and the Principal Trends in Modern Penology" in Wolfgang, Marvin E. (ed.) (1968) Crime and Culture: Essays in Honor of Thorsten Sellin Wiley, New York, pp. 3–10, ISBN 0-471-95958-8
- Charlesworth, James C. (1969) "The Academy Dips Its Colors to Dr. Sellin" Annals of the American Academy of Political and Social Science 381: pp. iii-iv
- Pastor, Selma (1985) A Bibliography of the Publications of Professor Thorsten Sellin Center for Studies in Criminology and Criminal Law, University of Pennsylvania, Philadelphia, OCLC 21939720
- Wolfgang, Marvin E. (1996) "Thorsten Sellin (26 October 1896 - 17 September 1994)" Proceedings of the American Philosophical Society 140(4): pp. 581–586

== Related reading ==
- Benson, Adolph B. and Naboth Hedin, eds. (1938) Swedes in America, 1638-1938 (The Swedish American Tercentenary Association. New Haven, CT: Yale University Press) ISBN 978-0-8383-0326-9
