= Pennsylvania Association of Broadcasters =

Association representing radio and television broadcasters in Pennsylvania, United States

The Pennsylvania Association of Broadcasters, commonly referred to as PAB, represents radio and television broadcasters across the U.S. state of Pennsylvania. It is affiliated with the National Association of Broadcasters. Every year the organization holds a convention where its main attraction, the luncheon for its Excellence in Broadcasting Awards, takes place (2006 winners). The organization also has a Hall of Fame .
