= Academy of Experimental Criminology =

The Academy of Experimental Criminology (abbreviated AEC) is a learned society founded in 1998 in order to recognize scholars who have made influential researchers in the field of experimental criminology. It does so by electing fellows annually, and by honoring criminologists with its Joan McCord Award and Young Experimental Scholar Award. The Academy was co-founded by David P. Farrington, who served as its second president from 2001 to 2003. The other founder was Lawrence W. Sherman, who served as its founding president from 1999 to 2001. It sponsors the Journal of Experimental Criminology, which was established in 2005.

== Presidents ==
- Lawrence W. Sherman (1999–2001)
- David P. Farrington (2001–2003)
- Joan McCord (2003–2004)
- David Weisburd (2004–2007)
- Doris L. MacKenzie (2007–2009)
- Lorraine Mazerolle (2009–2011)
- Anthony Braga (2011–2013)
- Adrian Raine (2013–2015)
- Peter W. Greenwood (2015–2017)
- Friedrich Lösel (2017–2019)
- Heather Strang (2019–2022)
