= International Society of Criminology =

International learned society

- Abbreviation: ISC
- Formation: July 16, 1937; 89 years ago
- Founders: Agostino Gemelli; Arturo Rocco
- Founded at: Rome, Italy
- Type: Learned society
- Legal status: Non-governmental organization
- Secretary General: Stephan Parmentier
- President: Emilio Viano
- Treasurer: Ichiro Tanioka
- Publication: International Annals of Criminology
- Website: intercrim.com

The International Society of Criminology (abbreviated ISC) is an international learned society dedicated to advancing the field of criminology. It describes itself as "the only worldwide organization in the field of criminology and criminal justice." It has held the World Congresses of Criminology periodically since 1938. The most recent of these congresses was held on the campus of O. P. Jindal Global University in Sonipat, India, in December 2016.

ISC publishes the International Annals of Criminology.

== History ==
The International Society of Criminology was established on July 16, 1937 in Rome, Italy. Its co-founders included Agostino Gemelli and Arturo Rocco. The society's founding president was Mariano d’Amelio, and Giovanni Novelli was elected the first vice president. Benigno di Tullio was elected as the first secretary general. The first International Congress of Criminology was held in Rome from October 3 to October 8, 1938. The society's activities were disrupted by World War II, and it was not revived until 1949. In December 1950, the ISC accepted the Society for the Advancement of Criminology (since renamed the American Society of Criminology) as its American member. In 1969, the ISC attempted to revive interest in criminology in Latin America when it held an International Criminology Course in Mendoza, Argentina.

== Presidents ==
The president of the International Society of Criminology is Emilio C. Viano. Previous presidents have included Lawrence W. Sherman, Albert J. Reiss, and Thorsten Sellin.
