= Jerzy Sarnecki =

Polish-Swedish criminologist

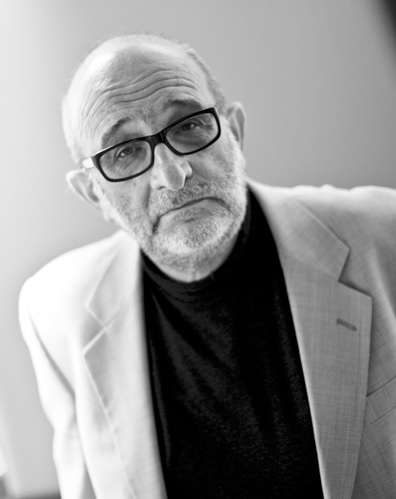
- Born: 7 July 1947 (age 79); Warsaw, Poland

Academic background
- Education: Stockholm University

Academic work
- Discipline: criminology
- Institutions: Stockholm University; Swedish National Council for Crime Prevention

Jerzy Sarnecki (Polish pronunciation: [ˈjɛʐɨ s̪arˈn̪ɛt͡skʲi]; born 7 July 1947) is a Swedish and Polish professor in criminology at Stockholm University in Sweden.

== Early life and family ==
Sarnecki was born in 1947 in Warsaw, Poland. His family is Jewish. During the 1968 Polish political crisis, his father was fired, allegedly because he was Jewish.

== Academic career ==
He studied geodesy in Poland and earned a PhD in sociology at Stockholm University in 1978. During his studies he also worked part-time at several youth recreation centres in Stockholm. From 1977 to 1986, he worked as a researcher at the Swedish National Council for Crime Prevention, where he focused on juvenile delinquency. He was the head of Division at the Swedish National Council for Crime Prevention from 1986 to 1993, when he became a professor in criminology at the Department of Criminology at Stockholm University. He was the head of the Department of Criminology from 1993 to 1998 and again from 2001 to 2003. He is also engaged at the Gävle University College, Södertörn University and at the Mid-Sweden University.

Sarnecki has also served as a member of the Scientific Commission of the International Society of Criminology from 2000 to 2005 and as vice-president of the Scandinavian Research Council for Criminology from 2001 to 2003. He is a member of the board of directors of the International Society of Criminology since 2005 and president of the Scandinavian Research Council for Criminology since 2004. Moreover, Sarnecki is co-chairman of the jury for the prestigious Stockholm Prize in Criminology.

== Public profile ==
Sarnecki is frequently invited to comment on current affairs by public service broadcaster Swedish Radio and has participated in the programs Radio P4, Godmorgon, världen!, Dagens Eko, and Tankesmedjan.

In February 2018, he stated in an interview with magazine Forskning & Framsteg that the increasing levels of gun crime in Sweden had taken him, Swedish criminologists in general and police in Sweden "by surprise".

In August 2018, in an interview with public broadcaster SVT, Sarnecki said that the Uppdrag granskning (an investigative journalism TV show) episode where reporters analysed the nationality of convicted rapists should never have been broadcast and criticized the reporters for making a connection between rape crime and ethnicity. He further argued that it is impossible to explain rape with cultural factors.

In a 2018 interview, Sarnecki stated that both he and his fellow researchers in Sweden held some responsibility for the lack of research into immigrant overrepresentation as convicted rapists in Sweden, saying that they ought to have researched it more. He stated that he was planning research to investigate the reasons why immigrants are overrepresented in crime, with a focus on sexual and violent crime. He also stated, in view of earlier research, that he thought that the major reason would be socioeconomic factors.

== Personal life ==
Sarnecki lives in Lidingö in Stockholm.
