= Peter Neyroud =

Peter William Neyroud CBE QPM (born 12 August 1959) is a British academic and retired police officer. He was the Chief Executive Officer for the National Policing Improvement Agency (NPIA), and Chief Constable of Thames Valley Police.

== Early life and education ==
Neyroud was educated at Winchester College, then an all-boys public school. He studied modern history at Oriel College, Oxford. He holds a Master of Science (MSc) degree in professional studies (crime and policing), a diploma in applied criminology and a Doctor of Philosophy (PhD) degree in criminology (Wolfson College, Cambridge: 2018).

== Career ==
=== Police ===
Neyroud joined Hampshire Constabulary in 1980, rising through the ranks to Detective Superintendent. He was appointed Assistant Chief Constable of West Mercia Constabulary in 1998 and reached Deputy Chief Constable two years later. He was appointed Chief Constable of Thames Valley Police in 2002.

His position within the National Policing Improvement Agency (NPIA) was announced by the then Home Secretary, Charles Clarke, in October 2005, taking up the post as the CEO (Designate) in January 2006. He announced his retirement from the NPIA in March 2010. The NPIA was operational from 1 April 2007 until 2012, when the Agency was closed and its training and research functions transferred to the College of Policing, which was set up following the recommendations of Neyroud's Review of Police Training and Leadership, which was commissioned by Home Secretary Theresa May and published in 2011.

Neyroud was awarded the Queen's Police Medal for services to the police in 2004 and is a widely published author on policing. He was appointed Commander of the Order of the British Empire (CBE) in the 2011 Birthday Honours.

=== Academia ===
Neyroud is a lecturer in evidence-based policing at the Institute of Criminology of the University of Cambridge.

=== Charitable work ===
Neyroud was appointed president of the Police History Society in 2025.

He is also the chair of the Blue Lamp Trust, an organisation providing home security for the elderly and vulnerable.

== Honours ==

Ribbon	Description	Notes
	Order of the British Empire (CBE)	2011
	Queen's Police Medal (QPM)	2004

Police appointments
Preceded by Sir Charles Pollard	Chief Constable of Thames Valley Police; 2002–2007	Succeeded by Sara Thornton
