= National Policing Institute =

American non-profit police research organization

- Formation: July 22, 1970
- Founded at: Washington, D.C.
- Type: Not for Profit
- Tax ID no.: 52-0906599
- Legal status: 501(c)(3)
- Headquarters: Arlington, Virginia
- Location: United States
- Services: Research, analysis, training, technical assistance, evaluation
- President: Jim Burch
- Director, Science and Innovation: Colby Dolly
- Director, Partnerships: A.J. Soll
- Staff: 21
- Website: www.policinginstitute.org
- Formerly called: Police Foundation, National Police Foundation

The National Policing Institute, formerly known as the Police Foundation, is an American non-profit organization dedicated to advancing policing through innovation and independent scientific research. It is headquartered in Arlington, Virginia.

== History ==
Since its creation in 1970 by the Ford Foundation, the National Policing Institute has conducted research in police behavior, policy, and procedure, and continues efforts in new evidence-based practices and innovations in policing.

The National Policing Institute has conducted studies and evaluations in policing, including the Kansas City preventive patrol experiment, that examined the effects of preventive patrol on crime, the Newark Foot Patrol Experiment that examined the effectiveness of foot patrol on reducing crime and Reducing the Fear of Crime in Houston and Newark, that assessed community perceptions of police and safety, and the Shift Length Experiment, which tested the impacts of different police shift lengths on patrol officers and agencies.

One early study, “Women in Policing,” that found significant underrepresentation among women in policing, leading the Institute to establish a Research Center on Women in Policing to encourage greater hiring of women in law enforcement.

Research supported by the National Policing Institute and conducted by collaborating scholars was also featured in Malcolm Gladwell’s book Talking to Strangers: What We Should Know About the People We Don’t Know and in TIME (November, 2022).

== Research, Evaluation, Training, and Technical Assistance Programs ==
The National Policing Institute has conducted research on many topics throughout its history, including police patrols, fear of crime, community policing, police accountability, and crime reduction approaches.

Following the murder of George Floyd, the National Policing Institute's Board or Directors authorized a $1 million campaign to support the Institute's policing reforms agenda, including the creation of a Council on Policing Reforms and Race, the creation of a visiting scholar on policing, race, and crime position, and two research experiments related to improving understanding of police labor relations and agreements and the efficacy of civilian oversight bodies.

As of 2023, active research projects on hot spots policing, problem-oriented policing, procedural justice, alternative and crisis response strategies, disparities in stops and arrests, police supervision models, and use of force policies are underway. Training and technical assistance programs in areas including crisis response, gun violence reduction and gun crime investigation, officer safety, and rural crime reduction aim to improve responses to crime and victimization in communities throughout the U.S.

== Publications ==
The National Policing Institute maintains a publication library as well as specialized collections, such as the After Action Review Library, the OnPolicing blog, the InFocus monthly newsletter, and Inside Our Impact, a bi-monthly newsletter. The Institute publishes an annual report detailing its key work and accomplishments, new publications and financial overviews.

== Organization ==
The National Policing Institute is overseen by an independent Board of Directors and led by its president, Jim Burch. As of 2022, the Institute had just over 50 staff members and an annual revenue of just over $14 million.

== Funding ==
The National Policing Institute was launched exclusively with private support from the Ford Foundation in 1970 but operates today with funding support from many public (federal, state and local governments) and private sources as well as donations.
