= Theresa A. Gannon =

Professor of forensic psychology at University of Kent

Academic background
- Education: University of Birmingham, University of Sussex
- Thesis: Cognitive distortions in child sexual offenders: fact of fiction? (2003)

Academic work
- Institutions: Victoria University of Wellington, University of Kent, University of Kent, University of Kent

Theresa A. Gannon is a British academic psychologist and chartered psychologist, and is a full professor at the University of Kent specialising in forensic psychology, especially of deliberate firestarters and sexual offenders. Gannon is a Fellow of the Academy of Social Sciences, and was awarded the British Psychological Society's Division of Forensic Psychology Lifetime Contribution to Forensic Psychology Award.

== Academic career ==
Gannon completed a degree in psychology at the University of Birmingham. In her third year she was 'fascinated' by a lecture on forensic psychology. She completed a PhD titled Cognitive distortions in child sexual offenders: fact of fiction? at the University of Sussex in 2003. Gannon then undertook a four year postdoctoral fellowship at Victoria University of Wellington, working with psychologist Tony Ward on the psychology of sexual offenders, before returning to the UK. Gannon worked Kent and Medway Social Care and Partnership NHS Trust, working with a wider range of different type of offenders in a medium secure unit. She took a position at the University of Kent, where as of 2024 she is Professor of Forensic Psychology and Director of the Centre of Research and Education in Forensic Psychology. Gannon is also a Chartered Forensic Psychologist.

Gannon is interested in sexual offending in men and women, and the cognitive behaviour of deliberate firesetters.

She describes providing a treatment plan for a sexual offender, but realising that he had a history of arson, and had never been treated specifically for it. This encounter prompted her to explore what reoffending rates were for people who deliberately set fires, and what treatments were available for them. Gannon obtained funding from the Economic and Social Research Council to explore the characteristics of firesetters, and eventually developed a theory of firesetting. She went on to develop this into a standardised treatment programme for people who set fires, and trained people in the UK and internationally to deliver the programme.

Gannon was editor in chief of the journal Psychology, Crime & Law from 2012.

== Honours and awards ==
In March 2015 Gannon was elected a Fellow of the Academy of Social Sciences.

Gannon and her team won the Outstanding Impact on Society Award at the Economic and Social Research Council Celebrating Impact awards in 2016, for "research on deliberate firesetters and a resulting treatment programme". Gannon planned to use the award to translate the standardised treatment programme into other languages.

In 2019 the British Psychological Society's Division of Forensic Psychology awarded Gannon their Lifetime Contribution to Forensic Psychology Award.

== Selected works ==
=== Books ===
- Gannon, Theresa A.; Ward, Tony; Beech, Anthony R.; Fisher, Dawn, eds. (14 November 2007). Aggressive Offenders' Cognition: Theory, Research, and Treatment. Wiley. doi:10.1002/9780470746295. ISBN 978-0-470-03402-6.
- Gannon, Theresa A.; Cortoni, Franca, eds. (July 2010). Female Sexual Offenders: Theory, Assessment, and Treatment. Wiley-Blackwell. p. 224. ISBN 978-0-470-68344-6.
- Craig, Leam A.; Dixon, Louise; Gannon, Theresa A., eds. (31 March 2013). What Works in Offender Rehabilitation: An Evidence-Based Approach to Assessment and Treatment. John Wiley & Sons, Ltd. ISBN 978-1-119-97457-4.
- Gannon, Theresa A.; Ward, Tony, eds. (February 2017). Sexual Offending: Cognition, Emotion, and Motivation. Wiley-Blackwell. p. 176. ISBN 978-0-470-68351-4.

=== Journal articles ===
- Tony Ward; Ruth E. Mann; Theresa A. Gannon (January 2007). "The good lives model of offender rehabilitation: Clinical implications". Aggression and Violent Behavior. 12 (1): 87–107. doi:10.1016/J.AVB.2006.03.004. ISSN 1359-1789.
- Tony Ward; Theresa A. Gannon (January 2006). "Rehabilitation, etiology, and self-regulation: The comprehensive good lives model of treatment for sexual offenders". Aggression and Violent Behavior. 11 (1): 77–94. doi:10.1016/J.AVB.2005.06.001. ISSN 1359-1789.
- Afroditi Pina; Theresa A. Gannon; Benjamin Saunders (March 2009). "An overview of the literature on sexual harassment: Perpetrator, theory, and treatment issues". Aggression and Violent Behavior. 14 (2): 126–138. doi:10.1016/J.AVB.2009.01.002. ISSN 1359-1789.
- Theresa A Gannon; Mark E Olver; Jaimee S Mallion; Mark James (29 June 2019). "Does specialized psychological treatment for offending reduce recidivism? A meta-analysis examining staff and program variables as predictors of treatment effectiveness". Clinical Psychology Review. 73 101752. doi:10.1016/J.CPR.2019.101752. ISSN 0272-7358. PMID 31476514.
- Theresa A Gannon; Mariamne R Rose; Tony Ward (1 September 2008). "A descriptive model of the offense process for female sexual offenders". Sexual Abuse. 20 (3): 352–374. doi:10.1177/1079063208322495. ISSN 1079-0632. PMID 18775843.
- Devon Polaschek; Theresa A Gannon (1 October 2004). "The implicit theories of rapists: what convicted offenders tell us". Sexual Abuse. 16 (4): 299–314. doi:10.1023/B:SEBU.0000043325.94302.40. ISSN 1079-0632. PMID 15560413.
- Gwenda M Willis; Pamela M Yates; Theresa A Gannon; Tony Ward (12 July 2012). "How to integrate the good lives model into treatment programs for sexual offending: an introduction and overview". Sexual Abuse. 25 (2): 123–142. doi:10.1177/1079063212452618. ISSN 1079-0632. PMID 22798205.
- Theresa A Gannon; Devon Polaschek (9 February 2006). "Cognitive distortions in child molesters: a re-examination of key theories and research". Clinical Psychology Review. 26 (8): 1000–1019. doi:10.1016/J.CPR.2005.11.010. ISSN 0272-7358. PMID 16480803.
- Theresa A Gannon; Mark E Olver; Emma Alleyne; Helen Butler; Victoria Lister; Caoilte Ó Ciardha; Katie Sambrooks; Nichola Tyler (16 December 2022). "The Development and Validation of the Firesetting Questionnaire." J ournal Of Psychopathology and Behavioural Assessment. https://doi.org/10.1007/s10862-022-10011-x
