= School security =

Measures for reducing threats to people and property in schools

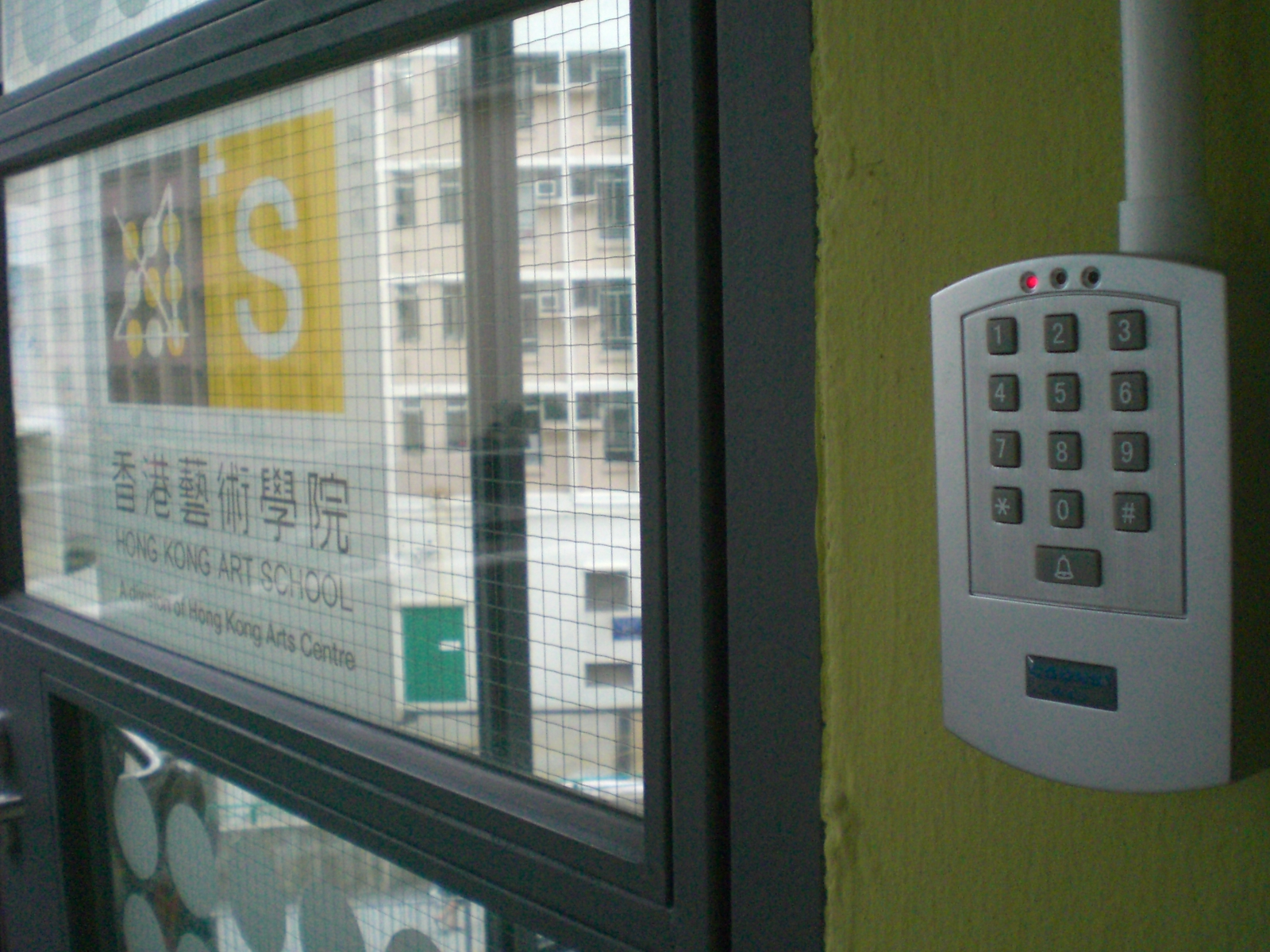
Electronic lock on a school arts room in Hong Kong

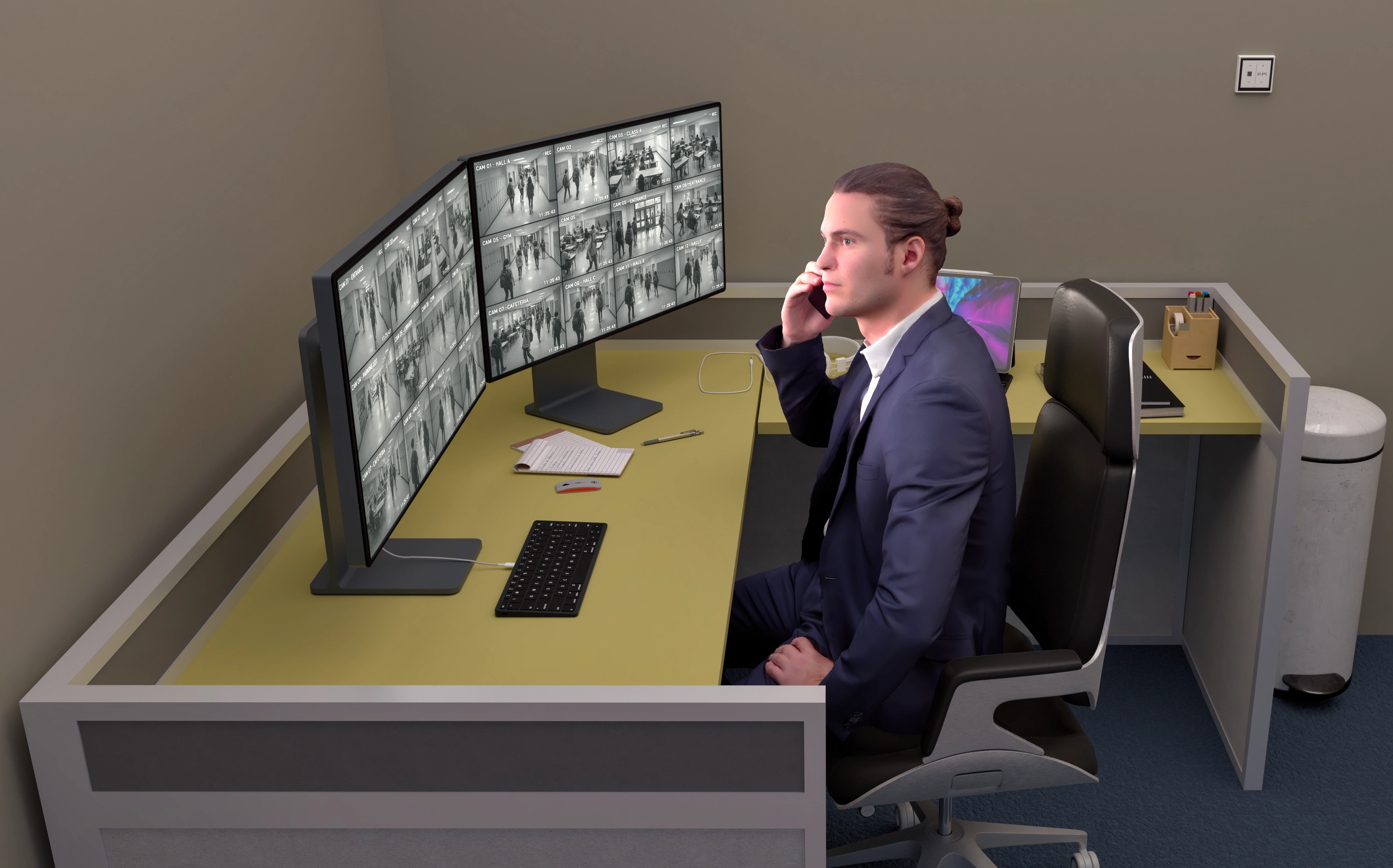
3D design of security camera monitoring for school security

School security encompasses all measures taken to combat threats to people and property in education environments. One term connected to school security is school safety, which is defined as the sheltering of students from violence and bullying, as well as exposure to harmful elements such as drugs, guns and gang activity. Along with other public places, schools are at risk for invasion from outside as well as attacks from students or faculty because of the high traffic of potential assailants and availability of victims.

== Safety threats ==
=== Shootings and bombings ===
In the US, as of January 2018, since 1990, at least 240 school shootings have occurred. School shootings have a 450% increase in the past 30 years, in which there were only 53 shootings. School bombings are less frequent at 22 in 2016, but according to the US Bomb Data Center, education related buildings are over twice as threatened than any other target. Over 74% of education related threats were middle schools, junior high, and high schools. Due to safety threats, during the 2013–2014 school year, reports say 93% of public schools lock or monitor doors and gates as a means of controlling access to the school; this is an 18% increase since the turn of the century.

Metal detectors are installed at the entrances of a small number of US schools to deter students from bringing metal weapons into schools. As of 2022, 2.4% of US schools had students go through metal detectors every day, and an additional 6.2% of schools sometimes used metal detectors for random checks.

=== Vandalism ===
Vandalism is often a problem for schools as they are an easy target. What constitutes vandalism varies among reports, which makes it difficult to get an accurate view of the extent of vandalism. However, vandalism generally refers to damage to property (graffiti, etc.) and break-ins. The Center for Problem Oriented Policing categorizes break-ins as being of three types: nuisance break-ins, where a break-in is done just for the sake of it; professional break-ins, with an intent of theft; and malicious break-ins, where damage is caused out of spite. Solutions for preventing vandalism include providing after-school and evening programs to engage youth that are loitering, improving lighting, adding security patrols, and education for students on anti-vandalism.

==== Policies on vandalism in New Zealand ====
The New Zealand government provides funding to public schools to repair vandalism. This funding comes from different sources depending on the type of damage that occurs. Two important guidelines regarding vandalism repair are that it must "be carried out immediately, and comply with Ministry standards."

=== Bullying ===
The National Center for Education Statistics reports that in the U.S., 20.8% of students ages 12–18 experienced bullying at school in 2014–15. Prevention for bullying by parents, teachers, and other adults includes talking to students about bullying, modeling treating others with kindness, and helping students get involved in something they are passionate about. Helping students understand the importance of bully reporting and learning ways to stop others from bullying can also be effective.

Between the ages of 11 and 15, in most countries around the world, boys are bullied more than girls. As reported by Young People's Health in Context, in Israel, almost twice as many boys ages 13–15 are bullied than girls; Belgium has a difference nearly as high. On average, bullying tends to peak at age 13. Lithuania experiences the highest level of bullying, with an average of 63.6% for girls between the ages of 11 and 15, and an average of 65% for boys between the ages of 11 and 15. Sweden experiences the lowest level of bullying, with an average of 14.7% for girls between 11 and 15, and an average of 15.3% for boys between 11 and 15.

== Security measures ==
Prevention methods fall into two main categories: threat assessment and physical measures. Noticing that a student is showing signs of depression or drug use and speaking to the student to learn more is an example of threat assessment. A lockable door is an example of physical measures.

The National School Boards Association states that ensuring safety and security in schools is the primary responsibility of every school district.

=== School Resource Officers ===
As gang and drug activity rises among other safety threats in U.S. schools, there has been an increase in police presence on school campuses. In 2014 the National Center for Education Statistics reported that 43% of schools in the U.S. had School Resource Officers on their campuses anywhere from once a week to full-time hours of operation.

School Resource Officers, also known as S.R.O.s, are often responsible for teaching a gang-resistance program to students. Commonly referred to as G.R.E.A.T., this program has been shown to be 39% effective at deterring at-risk youth from becoming involved in gangs or gang-related activity.

Some of these S.R.O.s are accompanied by dogs that are fully trained in drug and bomb sniffing. Although this could be potentially helpful, especially in the drug culture among students, it is a highly controversial issue as some believe it may go against Fourth (and possibly Fifth) Amendment Rights.

There are also concerns that the practices of S.R.O.s differ by student population type, as researchers have found that minority students in poor urban schools are more often subjected to invasive police searches than students in wealthier suburban schools. In places like the United States, this could contribute to the criminalization of poor students of color and the School-to-prison pipeline.

=== Surveillance ===
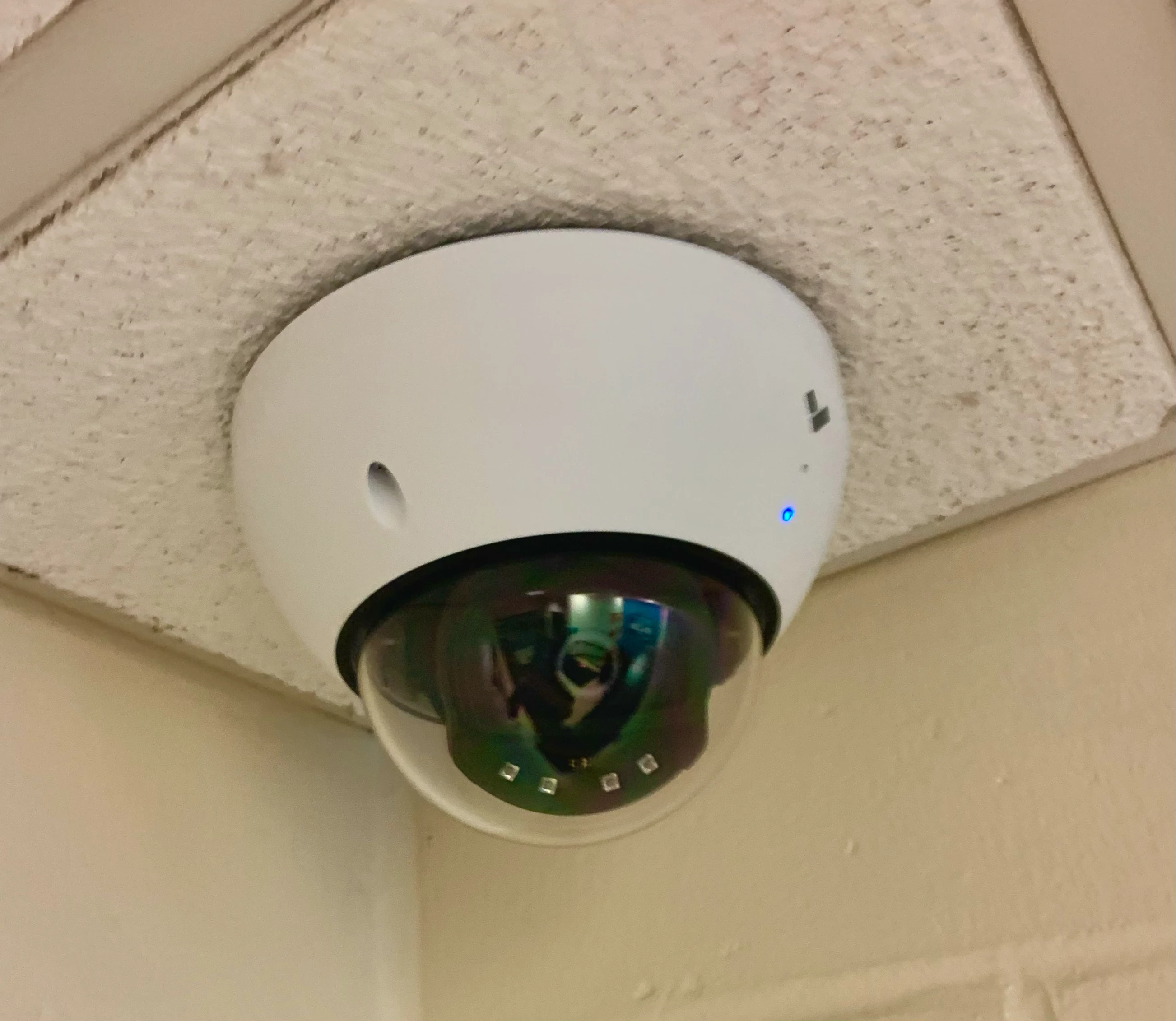
Wide-angle camera mounted from the drop ceiling

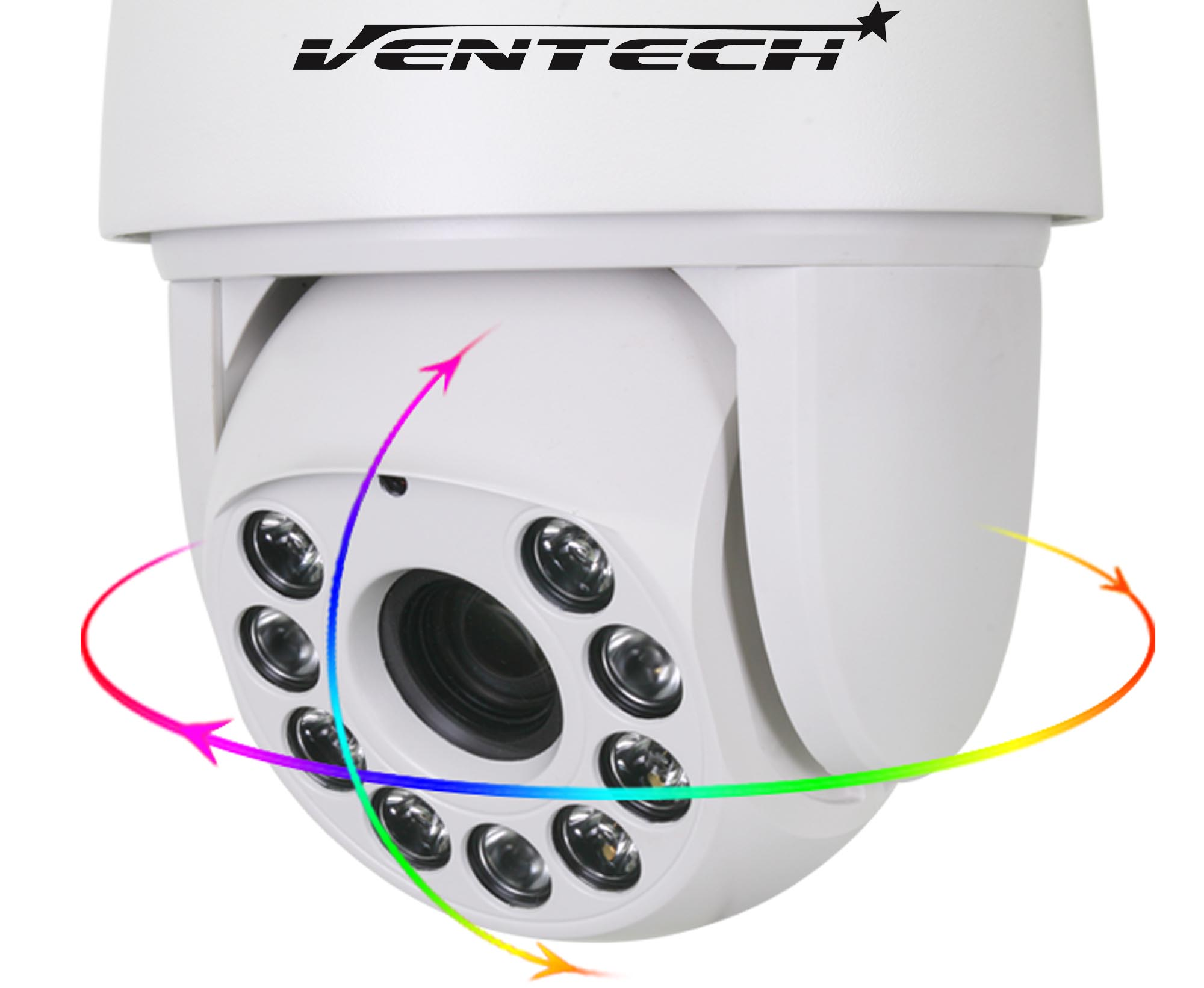
PTZ Camara

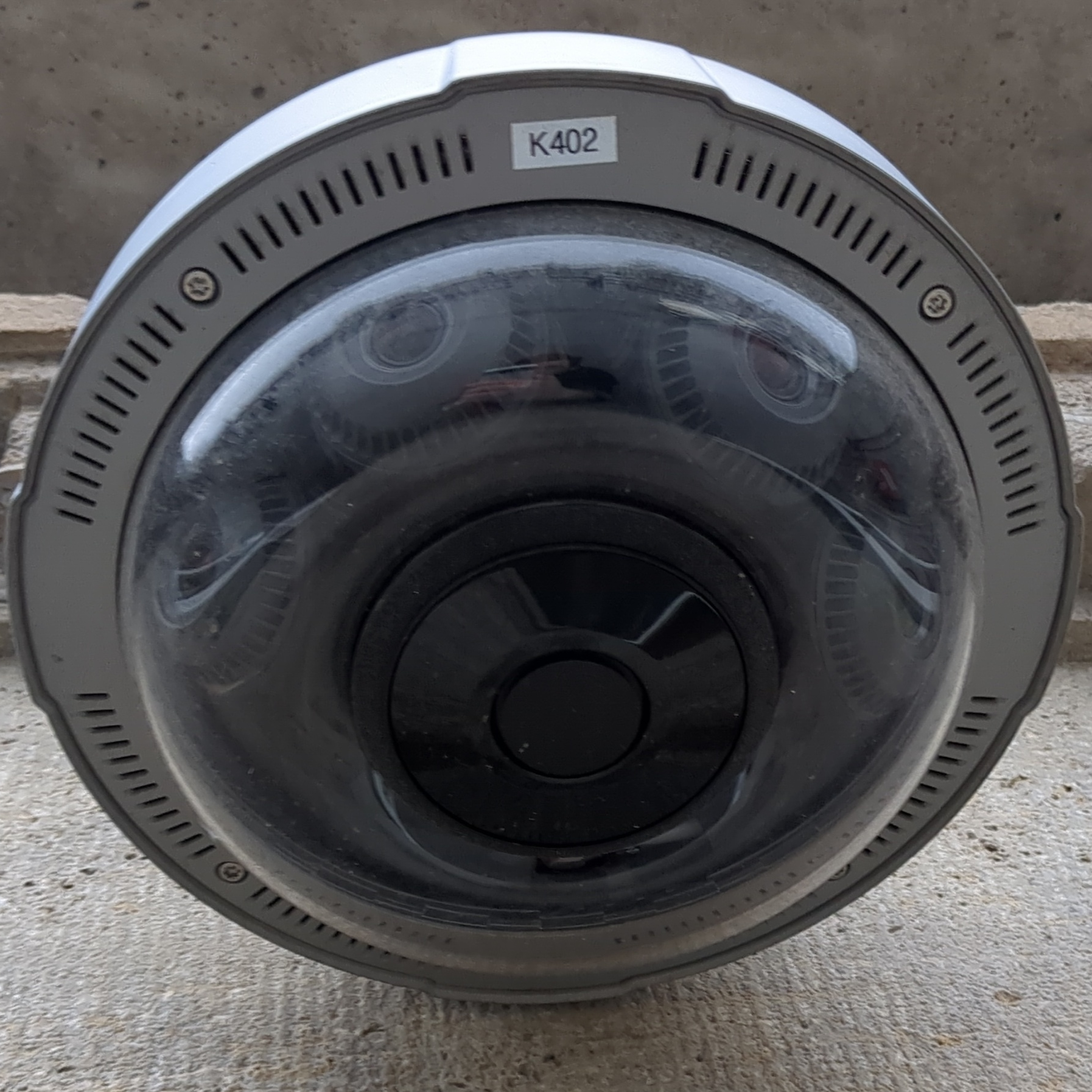
Panorama-style surveillance camera

Digital surveillance technology monitoring students, staff and visitors is currently being employed in schools around the world. According to the National Center for Education Statistics, by 2014, an average of 80% of secondary schools in the United States had installed security cameras. This was over 300% increase compared to the 19% of public educational facilities using video surveillance in 2000. Closed-circuit television (CCTV), the most common type of video monitoring system, is also reported to be prevalent in the United Kingdom and Australia. A possible 85-90% of secondary schools used CCTV in Britain, according to statistics claimed by Big Brother Watch. Cameras are also installed on buses to prevent violence, theft, illegal activity by students or drivers and as evidence against motorists who violate traffic laws regarding school buses.

In the new wave of technology, cyber-security has also become a concern as schools try to balance advancement in students' technological skills with the possibilities for misuse of borrowed devices and breeches in school servers.

=== Identification cards and badges ===
Student and faculty ID cards and/or badges are a possible way of improving school security. They allow school authorities to know immediately that the people carrying or wearing ID belong there. Student ID cards can help monitor student location. Tracking students through tracking chips has been controversial, however, due to concerns for privacy.

Identification badges for visitors to schools can alleviate confusion about who someone unfamiliar is, and school authorities will easily be able to determine where the visitor is authorized to go. These visitor badges can also be a way to conduct background checks before the visitor enters a school campus.

==== ID Cards in Poland ====
Students in schools abroad (outside of Poland) who are learning Polish language or academic subjects taught in Polish are eligible for Polish student ID cards. These cards provide benefits including transportation, museum, and national park discounts while visiting Poland. Students under age 18 can get one of these IDs, as well as teachers of Polish. They are valid for one school year.

=== Biometrics ===
Some schools use biometric data such as fingerprints and facial recognition to identify students. This may be for daily transactions in the library or canteen or for monitoring absenteeism and behavior control. In 2002, Privacy International raised concerns that tens of thousands of UK school children were being fingerprinted by schools, often without the knowledge or consent of their parents. The supplier, Micro Librarian Systems, which uses technology similar to that used in prisons and the military, estimated that 350 schools throughout Britain were using such systems. In 2007, it was estimated that 3,500 schools are using such systems. Some schools in Belgium and the US have followed suit. Concerns have been raised by a number of groups, who suggest the harms far outweigh any putative benefits.

=== School Security Fencing ===
Within the United Kingdom and around the globe one of the first line of school security measures is the application of a fencing system to control ingress and egress from the school grounds. Recently guidance by NaCTSO is that 'Screen from View' fencing should be adopted on school perimeters to combat the terrorist threat to schools.

OFSTED now includes the perimeter school fencing and physical access control as an area of review in the safeguarding of pupils on school grounds.

=== School Entrance Systems ===
School Entrance Systems along with the Biometrics, such as Mantrap Doors or Interlocking Doors as they are often industry termed can protect schools by only allowing a single verified person into or out of a school entrance at a time. Older systems use badge readers and newer ones use Facial Recognition

The system of doors usually consists of two lanes, one for entrance and one for exit, with two doors that are interlocked in a pair. A student usually can enter the outer door and then goes through a metal detector. Once the entrance door closes, a metal detection occurs and an identification takes place, the second door is opened and allows entrance to the school.

Although Mantrap Doors slow down the traffic into and out of the school and is troubled with piggybacking, it can protect everyone inside of the school from an unauthorized person. This type of door could have prevented the Robb Elementary school shooting May 24, 2022 and many of the previous shootings that have taken place within schools. Twenty-one people, including 19 children and 2 teachers died after the gunman, Salvador Ramos, at 11:42 AM walked through an unlocked door and into the building at Robb Elementary school in Uvalde, Texas.
