= Henry Otgaar =

- Born: 1983 (age 41–42) Maastricht, Netherlands
- Education: Maastricht University; Netherlands
- Occupations: Assistant Professor at Faculty of Psychology and Neuroscience
- Known for: Psychology, Neuropsychology, Psychology and Law
- Notable work: Finding the Truth in the Courtroom (2017): Dealing with Depression, Lies, and Memories

Henry Otgaar is a professor of legal psychology at Maastricht University in the Netherlands, and a research professor at the Leuven Institute of Criminology in Belgium. He is also a visiting fellow at City, University of London, and the Centre for Memory and Law.

His primary area of research is the development of memory. He also specializes in developmental differences in memory, the formation of false memories, the relationship between trauma and memory, the interrogation of children and adolescents, and the evolution of memory.

== Education ==
Between 2001 and 2005, Otgaar studied psychology, neuropsychology, and psychology and law. He completed his PhD cum laude between 2006 and 2009, followed by a postdoctoral fellowship from 2009 to 2011 at the Faculty of Psychology and Neuroscience at Maastricht University.

== Career ==
In 2002, he began working as a tutor at Maastricht University. From 2005 to 2006, he served as a teaching assistant in the Faculty of Psychology while pursuing his PhD, which he completed cum laude in 2009. Following the completion of his postdoctoral fellowship in 2011, he joined the faculty as an Assistant Professor of Psychology and Neuroscience.

While completing his PhD, Otgaar also began working as an expert witness for the Maastricht Forensic Institute in 2006. His research has since focused on the reliability of expert witnesses and memory in legal contexts. During his academic training, he developed a specific interest in the intersection of psychology and neuroscience, which continues to guide the majority of his research.

Otgaar's research focuses on the development of memory, with particular emphasis on the mechanisms underlying memory formation. His specialised area of expertise is the development of false memories.

He collaborates with research groups in the United Kingdom, Belgium, Canada, Sweden, and North America, and frequently serves as an expert witness in legal cases regarding the reliability of eyewitness testimonies, with a particular emphasis on cases involving child witnesses.

Otgaar is a member of the Dutch Expert Group on Sexual Abuse Cases, the National Expert Database, and its Committee of Exam and Advice, and works for the Maastricht Forensic Institute.

== Research ==
He has conducted research on repressed memories related to psychological trauma, susceptibility to false memory formation during survival processing, relative resistance of children to false memory effects, development of non-believed memories, and cognitive mechanisms behind false memory formation. He is particularly known for studying memory development from childhood to adolescence. Furthermore, his research pays special attention to the influence that environmental factors have on memory development.

One of Otgaar's most cited publications addresses the concept of repressed memories, examining their causes and the evolving perspectives within psychology regarding their development in adults. The study explores whether psychological trauma—regardless of conscious awareness—can lead individuals to forget autobiographical memories. Although repressed memories have long been debated in psychological, clinical, and legal contexts, Otgaar and his colleagues revisited earlier studies to explore underlying mechanisms that may support their formation. They identified three key processes associated with repressed memories: retrieval inhibition, motivated forgetting, and the relationship between trauma and dissociation.

Otgaar has also explored the phenomenon of non-believed memories—instances in which individuals recall an autobiographical event but do not believe it actually occurred, despite possessing recollective features. Although rare, this phenomenon is supported by research suggesting it arises more frequently in individuals who are highly susceptible to suggestion and persuasion.

Another significant area of Otgaar's research involves false memory recall. Drawing from prior findings that sensory perception is heightened during survival situations, Otgaar and his team tested whether children are less susceptible than adults to false memories under such conditions. Their results indicated that survival, pleasant, and moving scenarios all produced false memories to a similar extent. However, survival scenarios did result in improved true memory recall for both children and adults.

As an expert witness and clinical psychologist, Otgaar has applied his research in both courtroom and clinical settings. His findings suggest that survival-based scenarios may increase the likelihood of false memory formation, and he has emphasised the importance of recognising psychological factors—such as depression, post-traumatic stress disorder (PTSD), and trauma—that may elevate false memory susceptibility. His research also indicates that individuals are more likely to develop false memories when emotional information aligns with their existing knowledge base.

Some more of Otgaar's research includes: The Return of the Repressed (2019) and Adaptive Memory: Survival Processing Increases Both True and False Memory (2010).

== Awards ==
Otgaar received the Early Career Award from the European Association of Psychology and Law in recognition of his contributions to the field of legal psychology.

Additionally, in 2011, he was selected for the Edmond Hustinx Award for Science by the Faculty of Psychology and Neuroscience (FPN) at Maastricht University, which recognizes innovative, integrative research with international relevance.

== Books and publications ==
Otgaar has authored or co-authored over 200 scholarly works, including journal articles, book chapters, reports, and research briefs.
