= David Weisburd =

American criminologist

David L. Weisburd
- דייוויד ל. ויסבורד
- Born: 1954 (age 71–72)
- Education: Brandeis University, Yale University
- Occupation: Criminologist
- Employer(s): George Mason University, Hebrew University of Jerusalem
- Known for: Research on crime and place, policing, and white-collar crime
- Awards: Stockholm Prize in Criminology, Israel Prize in Social Work and Criminological Research

David L. Weisburd (Hebrew: דייוויד וייסבורד; born 1954) is an Israeli/American criminologist who is known for his research on crime and place, policing and white collar crime. Weisburd was the 2010 recipient of the prestigious Stockholm Prize in Criminology, and was awarded the Israel Prize in Social Work and Criminological Research in 2015, considered the state's highest honor. Weisburd is Distinguished Professor of Criminology, Law and Society at George Mason University. and Walter E. Meyer Professor Emeritus of Law and Criminal Justice in the Institute of Criminology of the Hebrew University Faculty of Law. At George Mason University, Weisburd was founder of the Center for Evidence-Based Crime Policy and is now its Executive Director. Weisburd also serves as Chief Science Advisor at the National Policing Institute in Washington, D.C. Weisburd was the founding editor of the Journal of Experimental Criminology, and is editor of the Cambridge Elements in Criminology Series. Since 2024 he is a member of the Israel Academy of Sciences and Humanities

== Research ==
Weisburd is a prolific researcher, who by 2023 had received more than $23 million in competitive grant funding and published over 35 books, 175 journal articles and 100 book chapters. Weisburd is best known for his work in place-based criminology, experimental criminology, and white-collar crime.

Weisburd's research on place-based criminology has demonstrated the importance of focusing on the role geographic micro-places, such as street segments, play in explaining crime. For instance, in a 1995 study in Jersey City, New Jersey Weisburd found that between 15% and 20% of all crime was generated by 56 drug market hot spots. In a recent longitudinal study of crime concentrations in Seattle, Washington: Weisburd and his colleagues found that between 5% and 6% of street segments in the city generated over 50% of the crime incidents each year. Importantly, this research also showed that these crime concentrations remained stable across time and place over the 16-year study period. Weisburd has also replicated these findings in Tel Aviv, Israel, where almost the same levels of concentration were found as in his Seattle Study. In Weisburd's Sutherland Address to the American Society of Criminology in 2015 he argued that the consistency of crime concentrations across cities and across time was so great that it suggested a Law of Crime Concentration at Places.

Weisburd's research has also repeatedly demonstrated the importance of these findings for crime prevention policy, particularly in the area of policing. With the focus on explaining crime through place-based factors, police and other crime prevention agencies have stable targets on which to focus their efforts. Beginning with a ground-breaking experimental study with Lawrence Sherman in 1995, Weisburd's research has repeatedly shown the efficacy of focusing police crime prevention resources on small hot spots of crime. Specifically, this body of research shows that crime and disorder is significantly reduced in targeted hot spots and that crime does not simply displace to nearby areas. In fact, Weisburd's research suggests that it is more likely that crime in nearby areas which received no extra police attention will also likely be reduced—a phenomenon that has been termed diffusion of crime control benefits. Weisburd's recent work has examined the impact of different types of police tactics in crime hot spots on people frequenting these targeted areas. One recent study examined the impact of police crackdowns on disorder on residents, while another focused on the New York City Police Department's usage of stop and frisks of suspicious persons. Weisburd and colleagues have shown, in a three city randomized trial, that when crime prevention teams focused on crime hot spots are trained in procedural justice approaches, they will treat people in the field with greater respect, make fewer arrests, and reduce crime to a greater degree than non-trained officers. That study also found that citizens will be less likely to see the procedural justice-trained officers as using too much force, or harassing people on the street.

Related to this work, Weisburd has also advanced the importance of randomized controlled trials in evaluating crime and justice policies and programs. Randomized, experimental designs produce the most valid and reliable evidence on the impact of policies or interventions, and thus Weisburd argues the field has a moral imperative to use experimental designs whenever feasible. His work in this area has also shown that there is a paradox in experimental studies, in which increasing sample size often has the unintended consequence of reducing the observed statistical power of a study.

Finally, Weisburd has also made significant contributions to our understanding of white-collar crime. In a large-scale empirical study of white-collar crime, he found that white-collar criminals were often from the middle classes, had multiple contacts with the criminal justice system, and that much white-collar crime was mundane and everyday in character.

== Education ==
Weisburd started his college career at Shimer College, leaving in 1973 to attend Brandeis University. Weisburd graduated magna cum laude in 1976, with a B.A. in sociology from Brandeis University, where he was elected to Phi Beta Kappa. Weisburd did his graduate studies at Yale University, where he received an M.A. in sociology in 1978, an M.Phil. in sociology in 1980, and a Ph.D. in sociology in 1985.

== Academia ==
Weisburd is currently a distinguished professor of criminology, law and society at George Mason University and the Walter E. Meyer Professor of Law and Criminal Justice of the Hebrew University Faculty of Law, and Prior to these appointments at Hebrew University and George Mason University, Weisburd served as a member of the faculty at the University of Maryland, College Park from 2002 to 2008 and Rutgers University from 1985 to 1993. Weisburd has also had a number of visiting and honorary appointments. These include a visiting professorship appointment at the Key Centre for Ethics, Law, Justice and Governance at Griffiths University in Brisbane, Australia in 2004, visiting scholar at the University of Cambridge in 2007, and honorary professor at the Zehjiang Police College in Hangzhou, China in 2011.

Weisburd has also held a number of research positions, in addition to his academic appointments. These included serving as a senior research associate at the Vera Institute in New York from 1984 to 1985, executive director of the Center for Crime Prevention Studies at Rutgers University from 1995 to 1996 (where Weisburd was also director from 1990 to 1995), senior research scientist at the Police Foundation in Washington, D.C. from 1997 to 2000 (where Weisburd is currently a senior fellow and chair of its research advisory committee), and visiting research fellow at the Netherlands Institute for the Study of Crime and Law Enforcement in Leiden, the Netherlands from 2004 to 2006.

== Awards and honors ==
Weisburd was awarded the Stockholm Prize in Criminology, the top honor in the field, in 2010. Weisburd has also been the recipient of numerous other awards and honors for his work in criminology and criminal justice. Most recently, he was awarded the Rothschild Prize in Social Science from the Yad Hanadiv Foundation, the Sir Robert Peel Award from the Cambridge Institute of Criminology, and the Beck Family Presidential Medal for Faculty Excellence in Research from George Mason University, all in 2022. In 2019, he received the Lifetime Achievement Award from the American Society of Criminology's Division of Policing, and in 2018, he received the James Short Senior Scholar Award from the American Society of Criminology's Division of Communities and Place. In 2017, he received the Lifetime Achievement Award for Research in Criminology from the Israeli Society of Criminology, and in 2015, he received the Israel Prize in Social Work and Criminological Research, considered the state's highest honor. In 2014, Weisburd received the Edwin H. Sutherland Award from the American Society of Criminology(ASC), and in 2017 he received the August Vollmer Award for contributions to crime prevention from the ASC. In 2016 he received the ASC's Mentoring Award. In 2014 he received the Jerry Lee Lifetime Achievement Award from the Division of Experimental Criminology of the American Society of Criminology, and the Robert Boruch Award for Distinctive Contributions to Research that Informs Public Policy by the Campbell Collaboration. In 2011, Weisburd was awarded the Klachky Family Award for Advances on the Frontiers of Science from the Hebrew University of Jerusalem. In 2010, Weisburd was awarded the Minister's Prize for Outstanding Scientists, Ministry of Immigrant Absorption in Israel. In 2008, he was presented with the Joan McCord Award for Outstanding Contributions to Experimental Criminology by the Academy of Experimental Criminology, where he was also elected as a fellow in 2001. In 2005, Weisburd was elected as an honorary fellow of the American Society of Criminology.

== Selected works ==
- Weisburd, David; Telep, Cody W.; Vovak, Heather; Zastrow, Taryn; Braga, Anthony A.; Turchan, Brandon (2022). "Reforming the police through procedural justice training: A multi-city randomized trial at crime hot spots". Proceedings of the National Academy of Sciences. 119 (14): 1–6. Bibcode:2022PNAS..11918780W. doi:10.1073/pnas.2118780119. PMC 9168920. PMID 35344441.
- Weisburd, David (2015). "The law of crime concentration and the criminology of place". Criminology. 53 (2): 133–157. doi:10.1111/1745-9125.12070.
- Weisburd, David, Elizabeth Groff and Sue-Ming Yang. (2012), The Criminology of Place: Street Segments And Our Understanding of the Crime Problem. Oxford: Oxford University Press.
- Braga, Anthony and David Weisburd. (2010) Policing Problem Places: Crime Hot Spots and Effective Prevention. Oxford: Oxford University Press.
- Weisburd, David; Wyckoff, Laura; Ready, Justin; Eck, John E.; Hinkle, Joshua C.; Gajewski, Frank (2006). "Does Crime Just Move Around the Corner?: A Controlled Study of Spatial Displacement and Diffusion of Crime Control Benefits". Criminology. 44 (3): 549–591. doi:10.1111/j.1745-9125.2006.00057.x.
- Weisburd, David; Bushway, Shawn; Lum, Cynthia; Yang, Sue-Ming (2004). "Crime Trajectories at Places: A Longitudinal Study of Street Segments in the City of Seattle". Criminology. 42 (2): 283–322. doi:10.1111/j.1745-9125.2004.tb00521.x.
- Weisburd, David; Eck, John E. (2004). "What Can Police Do to Reduce Crime, Disorder and Fear?". The Annals of the American Academy of Political and Social Science. 593: 42–65. doi:10.1177/0002716203262548. S2CID 28509376.
- Weisburd, David; Mastrofski, Stephen; Marie McNally, Ann; Greenspan, Rosann; Willis, James (2003). "Reforming to Preserve: Compstat and Strategic Problem Solving in American Policing". Criminology and Public Policy. 2 (3): 421–456. doi:10.1111/j.1745-9133.2003.tb00006.x.
- Weisburd, David (2003). "Ethical Practice and Evaluation of Interventions in Crime and Justice: The Moral Imperative for Randomized Trials". Evaluation Review. 27 (3): 336–354. doi:10.1177/0193841x03027003007. PMID 12789901. S2CID 32003736.
- Weisburd, David and Elin Waring (with Ellen Chayet). (2001). White Collar Crime and Criminal Careers. Cambridge: Cambridge University Press.
- Weisburd, David; Green, Lorraine (1995). "Policing Drug Hot Spots: The Jersey City DMA Experiment". Justice Quarterly. 12 (4): 711–735. doi:10.1080/07418829500096261.
- Sherman, Lawrence; Weisburd, David (1995). "General Deterrent Effects of Police Patrol in Crime 'Hot Spots': A Randomized Study". Justice Quarterly. 12 (4): 625–648. doi:10.1080/07418829500096221.
