= Robert J. Sampson =

American sociologist (born 1956)

- Born: July 9, 1956 (age 70); Utica, New York, U.S.
- Education: University at Buffalo (BA); University at Albany, SUNY (PhD)
- Occupation: Sociologist
- Notable work: Great American City: Chicago and the Enduring Neighborhood Effect

Robert J. Sampson (born July 9, 1956, in Utica, New York) is the Woodford L. and Ann A. Flowers University Professor at Harvard University and Director of the Social Sciences Program at the Radcliffe Institute for Advanced Study. From 2005 through 2010, Sampson served as the Chair of the Department of Sociology at Harvard. In 2011–2012, he was elected as the President of the American Society of Criminology.

== Education ==
Sampson received his Bachelor of Arts degree in sociology from the University at Buffalo, SUNY in 1977. He then went on to receive a Doctor of Philosophy degree in Criminal Justice from University at Albany, SUNY in 1983.

== Career ==
Sampson taught at the University of Illinois at Urbana-Champaign from 1984 to 1991 before moving to the University of Chicago where he taught in the Department of Sociology from 1991 to 2003. As of 1994, Sampson became scientific director of the Project on Human Development in Chicago Neighborhoods (PHDCN).

Sampson was a senior research fellow at the American Bar Foundation from 1994 to 2002. For the 1997–1998 and 2002–2003 academic years he was a fellow at the Center for Advanced Study in the Behavioral Sciences in Stanford, California.

In 2003, Sampson joined Harvard University where he became the Henry Ford II Professor of the Social Sciences. He also became the Founding Director of the Boston Area Research Initiative.

Sampson was elected as a fellow of the American Academy of Arts and Sciences in 2005 and a member of the National Academy of Sciences in 2006. He was a founding co-editor of the journal the Annual Review of Criminology.

== Research ==
Sampson has published widely in the areas of crime, neighborhood effects, ecometrics, and the social organization of cities. In the area of neighborhood effects and urban studies his work has focused on race/ethnicity and social mechanisms of ecological inequality, immigration and crime, the meanings and implications of "disorder," spatial disadvantage, collective civic engagement, and other topics linked to the general idea of community-level social processes. Much of this work stems from the Project on Human Development in Chicago Neighborhoods (PHDCN).

Sampson published his first book in 1993, co-authored with John Laub, entitled Crime in the Making: Pathways and Turning Points Through Life. It received the Michael J. Hindelang Outstanding Book Award from the American Society of Criminology in 1994. The book detailed a longitudinal study from birth to death of 1,000 disadvantaged men born in Boston during the Great Depression era. Sampson built upon the research of Sheldon and Eleanor Glueck, whose records had been stored in the Harvard Law School basement. The Gluecks had interviewed young men in the 1930s: Sampson revisited the same men, now in their 60s and 70s, to gather further data about their lives. The project is the longest life-course study of criminal behavior ever conducted. It showed, among other things, that even highly active criminals can change and stop committing crimes after key turning points in life such as marriage, military service, or employment that cut connections to offending peer groups.

A second book from this research, Shared Beginnings, Divergent Lives: Delinquent Boys to Age 70, published in 2003, follows up on the study by integrating personal narratives with the quantitative analysis of life-course trajectories across the seven decades in the lives of the disadvantaged subjects. Shared Beginnings, Divergent Lives received the outstanding book award from the American Society of Criminology in 2004.

In 2011, Sampson and fellow sociologist John Laub received the Stockholm Prize in Criminology for their achievements in the field of criminology. That same year, Sampson was elected to the American Philosophical Society.

In 2012, Sampson published Great American City: Chicago and the Enduring Neighborhood Effect, which details his decade's worth of research on the city of Chicago.

== Works ==
- Crime in the Making: Pathways and Turning Points through Life, with John Laub, 1995, ISBN 978-0674176058
- Attitudes toward Crime, Police, and the Law: Individual and neighborhood differences: Summary of research, with Dawn Jeglum Bartusch, 1999, OCLC 41631875
- Disorder in urban neighborhoods: Does it lead to crime, with Stephen W. Raudenbush, 2001, OCLC 46889396
- Developmental Criminology and Its Discontents: Trajectories of Crime from Childhood to Old Age, co-edited with John Laub, 2005, ISBN 978-1412936781
- Shared Beginnings, Divergent Lives: Delinquent Boys to Age 70, with John Laub, 2006, ISBN 978-0674019935
- The Explanation of Crime: Context, Mechanisms and Development, with Per-Olof Wikström, 2009, ISBN 978-0521119054
- The Moynihan Report Revisited: Lessons and Reflections After Four Decades, co-edited with Douglas Massey, 2009, ISBN 978-1412974028
- Great American City: Chicago and the Enduring Neighborhood Effect, 2012, ISBN 978-0262030717
- After Life Imprisonment: Reentry in the Era of Mass Incarceration, with Marieke Liem, 2016, ISBN 978-0521119054
- Marked by Time: How Social Change Has Transformed Crime and the Life Trajectories of Young Americans, 2026, ISBN 978-0674987548

Professional and academic associations
Preceded by Steven Messner	President of the American Society of Criminology; 2012	Succeeded by Robert Agnew
