= Fiona Gabbert =

Forensic psychologist

- Occupation: Professor

Academic background
- Education: University of Aberdeen

Academic work
- Discipline: Forensic Psychology
- Sub-discipline: Reliability of memory and forensic interviewing
- Institutions: Goldsmiths, University of London

Fiona Gabbert is a forensic psychologist who focuses on the reliability of memory and investigative interviewing. Her research is used to shape police procedure and policy internationally. She is the Director of the Forensic and Psychology Unit and Professor of Psychology at Goldsmiths, University of London, and a chairperson on the Scientific Committee of the International Investigative Interviewing Research Group (illRG).

== Education ==
Gabbert attended the University of Aberdeen where she received her PhD in psychology.

== Career ==
After graduating from the University of Aberdeen, she was a Reader in Psychology for Abertay University. As of 2026, she is a professor of Psychology at Goldsmiths, University of London and is working with Amber Alert Europe and the National Crime Agency, and the International Cold Case Analysis Project. In these partnerships, she is advancing ethical interviewing and applying psychological science to aid new leads in missing person cases.

=== Awards and accolades ===
In 2011, Gabbert was the winner of the Academic and Practitioner Excellence Award from International Investigative Interviewing Research. In 2016, Gabbert was the winner of the European Association of Psychology and Law prize for mid-career achievement.

=== Community engagement ===
As the Director of the Forensic and Psychology Unit (FPU) at Goldsmiths, University of London, Gabbert hosts many events with the goal to educate the public. One main way she educates the community, and the FPU engages with the public, is through the FPU's immersive, award-winning, and educational theatre events. These event, in particular, have compelled people outside of the Goldsmiths' community to come and engage with psychology. Other events include lectures, school events, festivals, panels, seminars, and more. For certain organizations, Gabbert gives seminars and research consultancy. Finally, Gabbert has also been known to engage with the media via interviews.

== Research ==
Gabbert's main research interests include eyewitness memory, investigative Interviewing, facilitating recall, building trust and rapport, suggestibility of memory, social influences on memory, and memory conformity. In some of her research, she specifically investigates questions such as "can we accurately interpret the dynamic behavior of others?". Gabbert also investigates the value and challenges of age progression and potential bias' or factors that lead to an overrepresentation of ethnic minority background in missing persons cases. Gabbert's most cited article on research gate is "Memory conformity: Can Eyewitnesses Influence Each Other's Memories for an Event?". This article discusses how individuals influence each others recall of an event.

Gabbert's research on improving usability, creditability, and reliability of evidence from witnesses has helped introduce new evidence based investigative tools and training resources to the field, such as the Self-Administrated Interview, Structured Interview Protocol, and the Timeline Technique. The Self-Administrative interview is a tool that is used right after someone witnesses a crime. The witness does the Self-Administrative Interview as soon as possible to make sure to relay the most accurate information. The SAI (Self-Administrative Interview) provides witnesses with clear instructions and retrieval cues. This tool is used globally and by police officers. The Structured Interview Protocol promotes new ethical practices that help officers elicit information from witnesses, victims, and suspects. The Timeline Technique helps interviewees organize their own recall of an event in a sequential manner. It is self-administered and typically yields better detail of an event according to Crest Research. Furthermore, through Crest Research, Gabbert developed an evidence-based training program regarding rapport within an information gathering context, and specifically whether individuals can be trained in their own rapport skills.

== Books ==
- Ridley, Anne; Gabbert, Fiona; and La Rooy, David, eds. 2013. Suggestibility in Legal Contexts: Psychological Research and Forensic Implications. London: Wiley-Blackwell.
