= EAPL =

EAPL may refer to:

- East Africa Premier League
- Easton Area Public Library
- Electoral Action of Poles in Lithuania – Christian Families Alliance, a political party in Lithuania
- European Association of Psychology and Law
- Eilat-Ashkelon Pipeline
