= Law of Crime Concentration =

Criminology concept

The law of crime concentration states that "for a defined measure of crime at a specific micro-geographic unit, the concentration of crime will fall within a narrow bandwidth of percentages for a defined cumulative proportion of crime." This law builds on the well-established empirical observation in the criminology of place that crime concentrates on very small units of geography.

Criminologist, David Weisburd, first proposed a formal "law of crime concentration" in 2015 after having observed the phenomenon across many cities. In their longitudinal study of street segments in Seattle, WA, Weisburd and colleagues (2012) observed not only that crime was concentrated, but across a 16-year observation period the level of concentration was remarkedly consistent: 50% of crime incidents were found at between 4.7% and 6.1% of street segments in the city each year, despite a decline of more than 20% in overall crime during that period. To test whether the law of crime concentration existed in other cities, Weisburd examined 8 additional cities in 2015. While noting variability between the five larger and three smaller cities, the overall range or bandwidth of crime concentrations observed was between 2.1% and 6.0% of streets producing 50% of city crime, and between 0.4% and 1.6% producing 25% of city crime, which supported a law of crime concentration across cities.

Studies examining crime concentration have used a range of micro-geographic units. However, the micro-geographic unit of the street segment has been the most commonly examined unit by researchers to date.

Since 2015, scholars have continued to test the law of crime concentration in cities across the world and the results continue to support a general framework of a law of crime concentration. For example, Schnell and colleagues (2017) analyzed violent crime incidents reported to the police in Chicago, IL between 2001 and 2014 and found that 56-65% of the total variability in violent crime incidents can be attributed to street segments in Chicago. Haberman and colleagues (2017) tested the law of crime concentration in Philadelphia, PA and the results closely matched the bandwidth percentages expected from Weisburd (2015). The law of crime concentration has even been tested in non-urban settings. Gill and colleagues (2017) tested the law of crime concentration in the suburban city of Brooklyn Park, MN and found that two percent of street segments produced 50% of the crime over the study period and 0.4% of segments produced 25% of the crime.

A law of crime concentration has important implications for crime prevention policy and practice. Knowing that a disproportionate percentage of crime occurs at a very small percentage of street segments allows jurisdictions to more efficiently allocate often limited resources. This is particularly important for police departments who can conduct focused patrols in the areas with the most crime incidents, also known as hot spots policing.
