= Ray Bull =

British psychologist

- Citizenship: British
- Occupation: President of the European Association of Psychology and Law

Ray Bull is a British psychologist and emeritus professor of forensic psychology at the University of Leicester. He is also a visiting professor at the University of Portsmouth and a part-time professor of criminal investigation at the University of Derby. Since 2014, he has been the president of the European Association of Psychology and Law.

== Work ==
Bull is known for his work on investigative interviewing of criminal suspects, witnesses, and victims.

== Honors and awards ==
Bull was elected as an Honorary Fellow of the British Psychological Society in 2010, a fellow of the Association of Psychological Sciences in 2009, and received the International Investigative Interviewing Research Group's Senior Academic Award in 2009. In 2012, he became the first honorary lifetime member of the International Investigative Interviewing Research Group. In 2008, he received the European Association of Psychology and Law's Award for Life-time Contribution to Psychology and Law.
