= AAAS Prize for Behavioral Science Research =

American psychology award, 1952–1993

The AAAS Prize for Behavioral Science Research was given by the American Association for the Advancement of Science to "further understanding of human psychological-social-cultural behavior". The award was presented starting in 1952 and last given in 1993.

== Recipients ==
- 1952 Arnold Marshall Rose
- 1955 Yehudi A. Cohen
- 1956 Herbert C. Kelman
- 1957 Irving A. Taylor
- 1959 Stanley Schachter
- 1960 Robert Rosenthal
- 1961 Morton Deutsch
- 1962 William A. Gamson
- 1963 Morris Rosenberg
- 1963 William J. McGuire
- 1964 Stanley Milgram
- 1966 Ivo K. Feierabend
- 1967 Irving Janis
- 1968 Bibb Latane
- 1969 Zick Rubin
- 1970 Elliot Aronson
- 1971 David C. Glass
- 1972 Norman H. Anderson
- 1973 Lenora Greenbaum
- 1974 William E. McAuliffe
- 1975 Robert B. Zajonc
- 1976 no award
- 1977 Jonathan Kelley
- 1978 Murray Melbin
- 1979 Ronald S. Wilson
- 1980 Bibb Latane
- 1981 Gary Wayne Strong
- 1982 Richard A. Shweder
- 1983 David P. Phillips
- 1984 Colin Martindale
- 1985 Dane Archer
- 1986 Bob Altemeyer
- 1987 Philip E. Tetlock
- 1988 Leda Cosmides
- 1989 Cathy Spatz Widom
- 1990 Bruce P. Dohrenwend
- 1991 Gerd Gigerenzer
- 1992 Patricia Marks Greenfield
- 1993 Nalini Ambady

== See also ==
- AAAS Award for Science Diplomacy
- AAAS Award for Scientific Freedom and Responsibility
- AAAS Philip Hauge Abelson Prize
- Newcomb Cleveland Prize
