= Ronald V. Clarke =

British criminologist (1941–2025)

- Born: 24 April 1941; Tanga, Tanganyika
- Died: 28 May 2025 (aged 84); Millburn, New Jersey, U.S.
- Education: University of Bristol; University of London
- Awards: 2015 Stockholm Prize in Criminology (with Patricia Mayhew)
- Scientific career
- Fields: Criminology
- Workplaces: Rutgers University–Newark
- Thesis: Factors influencing absconding by approved school boys (1968)

Ronald Victor Gemuseus Clarke (24 April 1941 – 28 May 2025) was an English criminologist and University Professor in the School of Criminal Justice at Rutgers University–Newark. He was also the associate director of the Center for Problem-Oriented Policing.

== Education ==
Clarke earned his BA in psychology and philosophy from the University of Bristol in 1962, and his MA in clinical psychology and PhD in psychology from the University of London in 1965 and 1968, respectively.

== Career ==
Before joining the faculty of Rutgers' Newark campus, Clarke did criminological research for the Home Office for fifteen years in his native United Kingdom. He became the director of the Home Office Research and Planning Unit in 1982. At the Home Office, he helped develop rational choice theory in criminology and launch the British Crime Survey. In 1984, he moved to the United States, where he originally taught at Temple University. In 1987, he joined Rutgers University-Newark as the dean of their School of Criminal Justice, a position he held until 1998. From 2001, he was a visiting professor at University College London's Jill Dando Institute.

== Editorial activities ==
Clarke was the founding editor-in-chief of the anthology Crime Prevention Studies.

== Death ==
Clarke died in Millburn, New Jersey on 28 May 2025, at the age of 84.

== Honours and awards ==
Clarke was a fellow of the British Psychological Society from 1978. He was the co-recipient of the 2015 Stockholm Prize in Criminology, along with Patricia Mayhew, in honor of their work in situational crime prevention.
