= Peggy Giordano =

American criminologist

- Awards: Stockholm Prize in Criminology

Academic background
- Education: BA, Sociology, University of Missouri; MA, PhD, Sociology, 1974, University of Minnesota

Academic work
- Institutions: Bowling Green State University

Peggy C. Giordano is an American criminologist. She is a Distinguished Professor Emeritus in Sociology at Bowling Green State University. In 2021, she received the Stockholm Prize in Criminology, the most prestigious international academic award in the field of law.

== Early life and education ==
Giordano completed her Bachelor of Arts degree in sociology at the University of Missouri before enrolling at the University of Minnesota for her graduate degrees in the same topic. As a graduate student, Giordano received Minnesota's inaugural fellowship for research in criminal justice in 1972.

== Career ==
After receiving her PhD in 1974, Giordano accepted a faculty position at Bowling Green State University (BGSU). One of her first projects at BGSU involved interviewing female inmates incarcerated in state institutions to understand what influenced their delinquency. While working alongside Stephen Cernkovich, she determined that while race was an impacting factor in crime, the growing feminist movement did not lead to an increase in crime. The researchers then followed up with the inmates years later to see how their life had changed. Shortly after, she was promoted to the rank of Distinguished Research Professor and inducted into the Ritenour School District Hall of Fame.

Although she retired as the Distinguished Research Professor in 2009, Giordano returned to BGSU's Department of Sociology the next fall to focus exclusively on her research. In 2010, Giordano published a book examining the life course of career criminals and their children. She followed a group of juvenile delinquents over a 20-year period and interviewed their adolescent children. Giordano later co-received a grant from the National Institute of Justice to explore the processes associated with "getting out" of crime. During the COVID-19 pandemic, she also received a grant from the National Science Foundation for her project "The Coronavirus Pandemic: Predictors and Consequences of Compliance with Social Distancing Recommendations Designed to Mitigate COVID-19 Spread." In 2021, she received the Stockholm Prize in Criminology, the most prestigious international academic award in the field of law.
