= John Laub =

- Born: John H. Laub; 1953 (age 72–73)
- Education: University of Illinois at Chicago Circle, State University of New York at Albany
- Awards: Stockholm Prize in Criminology (2011; with Robert J. Sampson)
- Scientific career
- Fields: Criminology
- Workplaces: University of Maryland, College Park, National Institute of Justice
- Thesis: Criminal behavior and the urban-rural dimension (1980)

John H. Laub (born 1953) is an American criminologist and Distinguished University Professor in the Department of Criminology and Criminal Justice at the University of Maryland, College Park.

== Education ==
Laub received his B.A. from University of Illinois at Chicago Circle in 1975, where he majored in criminal justice and minored in history. He went on to receive his M.A. and Ph.D. from the State University of New York at Albany in 1976 and 1980, respectively.

== Career ==
Laub joined the University of Maryland as a professor in 1998, and became a distinguished professor there in 2008. From July 22, 2010 to January 4, 2013, he was the director of the National Institute of Justice, a position to which he was appointed by President Barack Obama on July 16, 2010.

== Honors and awards ==
In 2011, Laub and Robert J. Sampson, with whom he frequently collaborates on research, jointly received that year's Stockholm Prize in Criminology. Since 1996, he has been a fellow of the American Society of Criminology, and in 2002-2003 he served as its president. In 2005 he received the Edwin H. Sutherland Award from the Society.
