= Beatriz Magaloni =

Mexican Political Scientist (born 1968)

Beatriz Magaloni-Kerpel
- Born: Mexico City
- Education: Duke University (Ph.D); ITAM (B.A.)
- Known for: Competitive authoritarianism Criminal Governance
- Scientific career
- Fields: Political science
- Workplaces: Stanford University (2001–Present)

Beatriz Magaloni is a political scientist. She is the Graham H. Stuart Professor of International Relations, Professor of Political Science, and a Senior Fellow at the Freeman Spogli Institute for International Studies at Stanford University. Since 2021, Magaloni is also a non-resident fellow at the Carnegie Endowment for International Peace

== Education ==
Magaloni graduated from Instituto Tecnológico Autónomo de México in law in 1989. She was awarded a PhD in political science by Duke University in 1997.

== Career ==
After her time as a visiting professor at University of California, Los Angeles and professor at Instituto Tecnológico Autónomo de México, she joined Stanford as an Assistant Professor of Political Science in 2001. In 2010, she founded the Poverty, Violence and Governance Lab at Stanford University, where she was the Director as of 2025. In 2018, she was promoted to full Professor at the Department of Political Science, Stanford University. In 2021, she was appointed the Graham H. Stuart Professor of International Relations at that same university. Since 2021, Magaloni is also a Non-resident fellow at the Carnegie Endowment for International Peace.

== Research field ==
Magaloni’s work has gained considerable international recognition for its substantial contributions to both comparative politics and criminology. Her research interests include authoritarian regimes, violence, human rights, poverty alleviation, distribution of public goods, and indigenous governance. It mainly concentrates on Latin America. In particular, she conducted research in Brazil and Mexico.

== Awards and international recognition ==
Magaloni's first book Voting for Autocracy: Hegemonic Party Survival and its Demise in Mexico (2006), was awarded the 2007 Leon Epstein Award for the Best Book published in the previous two years in the area of political parties and organizations and winner of the Best Book Award from the Comparative Democratization Section of the American Political Science Association.

Since then, Magaloni’s work increasingly shifted to a focus on poverty alleviation and criminal governance with an empirical focus on Mexico and Brazil. Magaloni was awarded the 2021 Heinz I. Eulau Award for the best article published in American Political Science Review for her paper “Killing in the Slums: The Problems of Social Order, Criminal Governance and Police Violence in Rio de Janeiro” (2020) (co-authored with Edgar Franco and Vanessa Melo).

In the fall of 2022, Magaloni was announced as the 2023 Winner of the Stockholm Criminology Prize, for her work on police violence in Mexico and Brazil. The jury motivated the award by stating that Magaloni is:

“ (…) the leading scholar in the world for demonstrating that major changes in policing can increase compliance with the rule of law under the challenges of high violence levels and strong popular demand to reduce crime"

== Selected publications ==
- Voting for Autocracy: Hegemonic Party Survival and Its Demise in Mexico (2006), Cambridge University Press
- Credible Power-Sharing and the Longevity of Authoritarian Rule. (2008) Comparative Political Studies Vol. 41 (4-5)
- Political Order and One-Party Rule. (2010) Annual Review of Political Science Vol. 13 (with Ruth Kricheli)
- The Game of Electoral Fraud and the Ousting of Authoritarian Rule (2010) American Journal of Political Science Vol. 54 (3)
- The Beheading of Criminal Organizations and the Dynamics of Violence in Mexico (2015) Journal of Conflict Resolution 59. No.8: 1455-1485 (with Gabriela Caldern, Gustavo Robles and Alberto Diaz-Cayeros).
- The Political Logic of Poverty Relief: Electoral Strategies and Social Policy in Mexico (2016), with Alberto Diaz-Cayeros and Federico Estévez, Cambridge University Press
- Authoritarian Survival and Poverty Traps: Land reform in Mexico (2016) World Development 77, pp. 154–170 (with Michael Albertus, Alberto Diaz-Cayeros, and Barry Weingast).
- Public Good Provision and Traditional Governance in Indigenous Communities in Oaxaca, Mexico(2019) in Comparative Political Studies Vol. 52(12) pp. 1841–1880, (with Alberto Diaz-Cayeros and Alex Ruiz.)
- Killing in the Slums: The Problems of Social Order, Criminal Governance and Police Violence in Rio de Janeiro (2020) American Political Science Review May: 114(2):552-72, (with Edgar Franco and Vanessa Melo)
- Institutionalized Police Brutality: Torture, the Militarization of Security and the Reform of Inquisitorial Justice in Mexico (2020) American Political Science Review Vol 114, No.4, (with Luis Rodriguez)
- Living in Fear: The Dynamics of Extortion in Mexico’s Drug War (2020) Comparative Political Studies Comparative Political Studies. 2020 Jun;53(7):1124-74, (with Gustavo Robles, Aila Matanock, Vidal Romero and Alberto Diaz-Cayeros)
