= Friedrich Lösel =

German Criminologist

- Born: July 28, 1945 (age 81); Neuendettelsau, Germany
- Education: University of Erlangen-Nuremberg
- Known for: Life-course criminology
- Awards: 2006 Stockholm Prize in Criminology
- Scientific career
- Fields: Criminology
- Workplaces: Cambridge Institute of Criminology; University of Erlangen-Nuremberg

Friedrich Lösel (born July 28, 1945) is a German forensic psychologist, criminologist and emeritus professor at the Cambridge Institute of Criminology. He was the director of the Institute from 2005 to 2012; as director, he pursued a focus on studying crime committed across the life-course. He is also a professor of psychology at the University of Erlangen-Nuremberg, where he was the director of the Institute of Psychology from 1987 to 2011. He was formerly the director of the Social Sciences Research Center at the University of Erlangen-Nuremberg from 2002 to 2005. He is the past president of the European Association of Psychology and Law and the current president of the Academy of Experimental Criminology. In 2006, he was one of two recipients of the Stockholm Prize in Criminology, with John Braithwaite.
