= Cathy Spatz Widom =

American psychologist

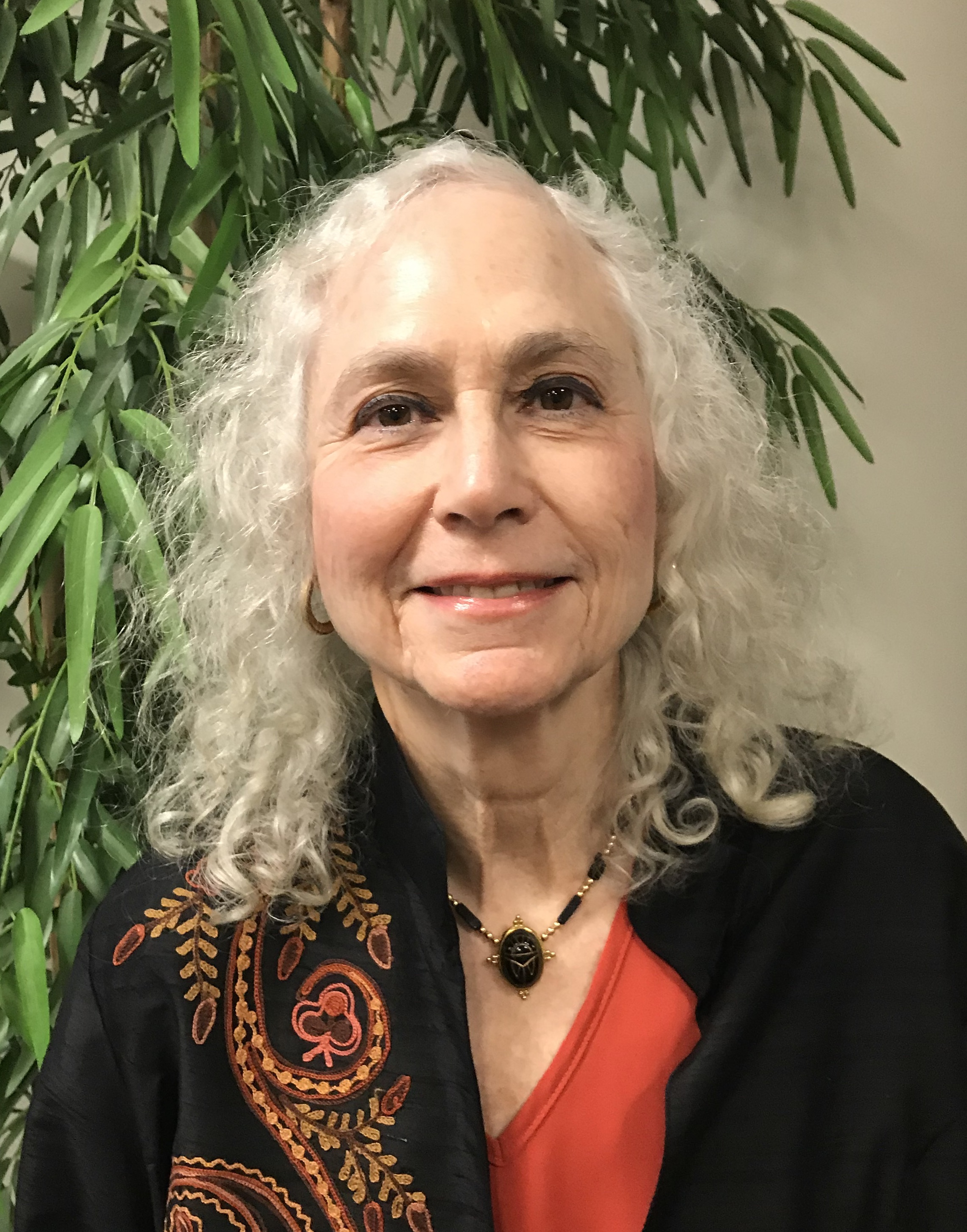
- Education: Cornell University, Brandeis University
- Occupation: Distinguished Professor
- Organization(s): John Jay College of Criminal Justice, CUNY
- Awards: Stockholm Prize in Criminology

Cathy Spatz Widom is a Distinguished Professor of Psychology at John Jay College of Criminal Justiceof the City University of New York. She is known for her research on long term consequences of early childhood physical and sexual abuse and child neglect. Widom received the AAAS Prize for Behavioral Science Research in 1989, the Edwin H. Sutherland Award in 2013, and the Stockholm Prize in Criminology in 2016.

== Biography ==
Cathy Spatz Widom received her Bachelor of Arts degree in child development and family relationships at Cornell University in Ithaca, New York. She went to pursue her Master and Ph.D degrees in psychology at Brandeis University. She is currently Distinguished Professor of Psychology at John Jay College of Criminal Justice of the City University of New York. Widom's primary focus is on the long-term consequences of child abuse and neglect, and area in which she has published numerous papers on the cycle of violence. She is a fellow of the three divisions of American Psychological Association (Division 41 - Psychology and Law, Division 43 – Society for Family Psychology, and Division 37 – Child and Family Policy and Practice), the American Psychopathological Association, and the American Society of Criminology. Widom's research has been supported by grants from the National Institute of Justice, National Institute of Mental Health, and National Institute on Drug Abuse.

Widom was co-editor of the Journal of Quantitative Criminology from 2010 to 2013.

== Research ==
Widom is known for her research pertaining to early childhood abuse (physical and sexual) and neglect in relation to later adversity, such as post-traumatic stress disorder, major depressive disorder, teenage pregnancy, intimate partner violence, prostitution, and exposure to HIV and other sexually transmitted diseases. She collected one of the only longitudinal datasets in the world on child abuse and neglect; throughout her career she has developed innovative methodologies, most recently adding biological markers to understanding pathways linking early abuse and neglect to adult outcomes. Recently, she published her second paper in Science on the intergenerational transmission of child abuse and neglect.

== Representative publications ==
- Gilbert, R., Widom, C. S., Browne, K., Fergusson, D., Webb, E., & Janson, S. (2009). Burden and consequences of child maltreatment in high-income countries. The Lancet, 373(9657), pages 68–81.
- Widom, C. S. (1989). The cycle of violence. Science, 244(4901), pages 160–166.
- Widom, C. S. (1999). Posttraumatic stress disorder in abused and neglected children grown up. American Journal of Psychiatry, 156(8), pages 1223–1229.
- Widom, C. S., DuMont, K., & Czaja, S. J. (2007). A prospective investigation of major depressive disorder and comorbidity in abused and neglected children grown up. Archives of General Psychiatry, 64(1), pages 49–56.
- Wilson, H. W., & Widom, C. S. (2011). Pathways from childhood abuse and neglect to HIV-risk sexual behavior in middle adulthood. Journal of Consulting and Clinical Psychology, 79(2), pages 236–246.
