= Jonathan Shepherd =

Welsh surgeon

Jonathan P Shepherd is a Welsh surgeon, criminologist and professor at Cardiff University's Crime and Security Research Institute, which he co-founded in 2015. He also founded the university's Violence Research Group. Shepherd has initiated UK public service reforms and other measures to strengthen the evidence foundations on which these services are based. These include new professional bodies for policing, probation and teaching; the UK What Works Centres and What Works Council; new university police research centres in England and Wales; and a new police research funding scheme.

== Research and its Impact ==
=== Cryosurgery ===
Shepherd's research career began as a research fellow in the Nuffield Department of Surgery at Oxford University (1978–79) where, leading to his Oxford MSc, he studied wound healing after cryosurgery under the supervision of Rodney Dawber. He discovered that the reasons low temperature injury resulted in little or no scarring was the preservation of the fibrous architecture of the dermis and resistance to low temperatures of fibroblasts.

=== Epstein Barr Virus and jaw tumours ===
During a UK government Overseas Development Administration (Now DfID) secondment as a surgeon to the Ahmadu Bello University, Kaduna, Nigeria, he studied links between Epstein Barr Virus (EBV) and the jaw tumour prevalent in sub Saharan Africa, ameloblastoma. This research was inspired by the work of Denis Burkett who had found a causal link between this virus and lymphoma. Shepherd found no links with ameloblastoma apart from in immunocompromised patients. After returning to his substantive surgical training post in Leeds in 1981 he donated the remaining serum samples from his research in Nigeria to Harald zur Hausen for his ongoing research on Human Papilloma Virus – work which would win zur Hausen the Nobel Prize for Physiology or Medicine.

=== Violence ===
Shepherd's surgical experiences in West Yorkshire (1980–3) brought about an interest in behavioural science and epidemiology. He observed that the miners' strikes in the Yorkshire Coalfield led to more people being injured in violence, and that a few pubs seemed to be the locations of hugely disproportionate numbers of violent incidents.

Following his appointment as senior lecturer and consultant oral and maxillofacial surgeon at Bristol University and the United Bristol Hospitals he completed his PhD, Assault; Characteristics of Injuries and Injured, awarded in 1988, supervised by Phyllida Parsloe and Crispian Scully. In these studies of consecutive patients injured in violence who attended the emergency department of the Bristol Royal Infirmary, Shepherd discovered that three-quarters of these incidents were not known to the police; that these patients went through a bereavement process; that their depression and anxiety levels remained much higher than in patients with similar injures but sustained in accidents rather than violence; and that a previously unrecognised weapon type, glasses, had been used to inflict injury in 10% of cases. These and other findings are the foundations of all Shepherd's research, policy development and impact on violence which followed.

=== Two new research groups ===
After appointment as professor of oral and maxillofacial surgery and head of the department of oral surgery, medicine and pathology at the University of Wales College of Medicine (part of Cardiff University since 2004), Shepherd created the Violence Research Group and the Clinical Decisions Research Group.

=== Clinical decisions and the first NICE guidance ===
Shepherd established the Clinical Decisions Research Group expressly to investigate decisions about wisdom teeth, the surgical removal of which, in the early 1990s, was one of only four surgical operations common to both top ten lists of UK in-patient and day case procedures. Working with Mark Brickley, he discovered that decisions to operate were being made almost at random; that complication rates were far higher if these teeth were removed under general anaesthesia compared with local anaesthesia; and that prophylactic removal resulted in worse outcomes for patients and less cost benefit than removal only after these teeth had become diseased. These findings were instrumental in the mid-1990s in the substantial switch away from prophylactic surgery and removal under general anaesthesia on an in-patient basis, and also prompted the first guidelines and technology appraisal published by the then National Institute for Clinical Excellence (NICE) in 2000.

=== Violence research since 1991 ===
Prompted by his PhD and subsequent confirmation that police ascertain, at most, only 50% of violence which results in emergency treatment, and by public fears of violence, Shepherd, with Vaseekaran Sivarajasingam, founded the National Violence Surveillance Network (NVSN) of 120 hospital emergency departments across England and Wales. Since 2000, NVSN has published annual reports on violence. These demonstrate falling violence trends almost identical to those derived from the Office of National Statistics' Crime Survey of England and Wales, and attest to the unreliability of police records as a measure of violence. This new, hospital perspective, is of violence affecting all age groups and both genders and has done much to clarify violence trends and risks.

== Psychological impact of violence ==
Working with Jonathan Bisson, Shepherd studied post-traumatic stress and concluded that there was evidence of traumatic stress disorder in around 30% of people injured in violence, and that a diagnosis of PTSD could be predicted on the basis of patients' acute stress reactions identified by junior surgeons in the emergency department when patients first attend. They then carried out a randomised trial of cognitive behavioural therapy and discovered that this could prevent the onset of PTSD symptoms. These findings prompted Shepherd and Bisson to start a victim support clinic in the emergency department, as Shepherd had done in the Bristol Royal Infirmary. But evaluation showed little uptake, and a PTSD service was set up with third sector Victim Support services referring patients through primary care instead. Based on their findings, Shepherd and Bisson designed a framework for the management of the mental health impact of violence, published by the Royal College of Psychiatrists.

== Risk factors for violence ==
=== Glassware ===
Having discovered that many people are injured in violence where glasses are used as weapons and that glass fragmentation rather than whole glasses were the problem, Shepherd set about finding out which glass types were most frequently involved, and how they stood up to laboratory impact testing. A national survey showed that straight sided pint glasses (noniks) were used in three-quarters of these incidents and, subsequently, that one particular pint glass product was much more impact resistant than all the rest. Prompted by this finding Shepherd led a randomised trial of tempered pint glasses in pubs in the West Midlands and South Wales and concluded that tougher glasses were associated with a 60% lower injury risk compared with less impact resistant glasses. In turn this prompted Shepherd to lead the Face of Wales campaign, supported by the Welsh Development Agency, for a switch to tempered glassware in the UK pub trade – a campaign which resulted in this change in the late 1990s, a change which Home Office statisticians estimated was associated with a reduction in glass assaults of around 47,000/year.

=== Violence not known to the police ===
Shepherd's discovery that the police were unaware of 50–75% of violence which results in hospital treatment – a finding since replicated in every Western country where this overlap has been studied – prompted him to hypothesise that emergency departments are sources of unique information which could be used to prevent violence more effectively than is possible using police intelligence alone. To test this idea, in 1996 he convened the Cardiff Violence Prevention Group (now Board). This group was a prototype Community Safety Partnership and was replicated by law across Britain in 1998. First, methods of collection in emergency departments of data on precise violence location, weapon, time and day and assailants were compared; electronic data capture by receptionists (termed registrars in the United States) proved most effective and sustainable. Second, the use of these hospital data was trialled in the context of violence in pubs and nightclubs – and found to result in significantly greater prevention. Third, a controlled experiment in 14 similar cities was carried out with collaborators at the Centers for Disease Control and Prevention (CDC) in the U.S; violence levels in the intervention city fell 42% more than in control cities.

Shepherd has attributed this decline in part to better targeted policing and an increased use of street CCTV. Fourth, an economic analysis concluded that cost benefit ratios were highly favourable; in Cardiff alone in 2007, savings were £6.9M compared with estimated costs in similar cities. This evidence is central to the UK government's impact assessment of new public health measures which led to the decision to mandate multiagency violence prevention; this new law was announced in the December 2019 Queen's Speech to the UK parliament.

By 2007, violent incidents in Cardiff had declined by 40%. In 2009, the Cardiff Violence Prevention Group received the Queen's Anniversary Prize.

This "Cardiff Model" was first implemented elsewhere in the UK in the late 1990s, starting in south east England, Merseyside and in Glasgow. In 2008, it was included in the UK government's alcohol strategy and in 2010 it was included in the new coalition government's programme. By 2014 more than 60% of emergency departments were collecting and sharing Cardiff Model data and in 2016 this became mandatory in England. In 2017, the data were included in the new Emergency Care Data Set. The Model has been endorsed by the World Health Organization, adopted by the Centers for Disease Control and Prevention (CDC) for implementation in the United States, and implemented in cities in the United States, Australia, South Africa and the Netherlands.

Shepherd summarised the public health effectiveness of policing and criminal justice systems in an article in the Lancet.

== Childhood risk factors ==
After discovering a distinctive pattern of illness and injury among people injured in violence, Shepherd coined the term DATES Syndrome (Drug Abuse, Assault, Trauma and Elective Surgery). He then led a series of studies with the Cambridge criminologist David Farrington of links between offending and health, using data from the longitudinal Cambridge Study of Delinquent Development (CSDD). Discoveries from this research include relatively good health among young offenders until their mid-20s; strong links between childhood impulsivity, adolescent offending and injury; and that early death and disability by age 48 which they discovered, is linked with conviction between ages 10–18 and antisocial behaviour at age 8–10.

== Alcohol ==
Shepherd's finding that consumption of more than eight units of alcohol in a drinking session substantially increased the risk of injury in violence prompted him and his colleagues to investigate links between alcohol prices and violence, and the effectiveness of brief motivational advice to reduce risky consumption. Of all the drivers of injury in violence they studied, low alcohol price was found to be the most powerful. In six randomised trials, Shepherd and his colleagues found that this advice was effective for at least a year when it was given to alcohol abusers on probation, in trauma clinics and in primary care, but not effective when it was given to offenders in magistrates' courts or to patients in emergency departments – when offenders' and patients' thoughts were dominated by their conviction or injuries or clouded by their intoxication.

To incorporate this effective advice into national health services, Shepherd, collaborating with Welsh Government, led two knowledge transfer projects. With Craig and Sarah Jones, he developed brief advice training courses, local collaborations across Wales, a training team, and social media support under the new "Brief Advice works, Have a Word!" brand. By 2017, 18,000 practitioners had been trained, the Have a Word package sold to Public Health England, and the scheme implemented in the armed forces by the Ministry of Defence.

== Research on evidence and public services ==
Shepherd's study of controlled trials across public services showed that there had been an exponential increase of these rigorous evaluations in healthcare, but not in other sectors such as education and policing. Shepherd concluded that this disparity reflected a lack of organisations which publish evidence-based guidelines, such as the National Institute for Health and Care Excellence, in these other sectors and that these organisations should be replicated in other public services and a mechanism created for sectors to learn from each other about evidence.

He campaigned for these changes through Sir Adrian Smith at the UK Department for Business and Skills and Sir Michael Bichard, director of the Institute for Government. As a result, the Institute for Government ran a conference where these proposals found favour. This was the genesis of the new "What Works Centres" (NICE equivalents across six service sectors) and the "What Works Council" supported by the Cabinet Office and the Economic and Social Research Council.

Next, supported by the Cabinet Office What Works team, Shepherd investigated what he first defined as the "evidence ecosystem", in which evidence first has to be generated, then synthesised, and then adopted and used in practice and policy. This needs to be a dynamic process Shepherd concluded – evidence demand is needed as well as supply. The report's recommendations for a research funding scheme for policing, for a social policy trials unit and for a professional body for teachers were adopted in the form of the new Police Knowledge Fund, the Government Trials advisory Panel and the Chartered College of Teaching.

Shepherd also proposed a national College of Policing – a medical Royal College equivalent. This concept was adopted by the Home Office and the new college launched in 2013. Shepherd also proposed and worked for a similar standard setting institution for probation. The Probation Institute was launched by the president of the Supreme Court, Lord Neuberger, at an event hosted by Shepherd at the Royal College of Surgeons in 2014.

Shepherd was nominated by the Royal College of Surgeons to explain to teachers' leaders the value and functions of a medical Royal College and how these might be applied to form a standard setting professional body for teachers and teaching. After serving on the Commission which produced a blueprint for a new College of Teaching and Shepherd's appointment as a founder College trustee, the new Chartered College was founded in 2016.

To improve effectiveness and cost benefit of public services on the basis of reliable evidence, Shepherd also convened two evidence summits, at the Royal College of Surgeons in 2012, and at the Institution of Civil Engineers in 2013.

Shepherd wrote The Declaration on Evidence which was agreed by the UK medical Royal Colleges, the College of Policing and the Chartered College of Teaching - institutions with a major influence on the professional lives of over a million practitioners. This declaration was signed by the leaders of these bodies at the Royal Society in November 2017 at an event hosted by Shepherd and the Alliance for Useful Evidence and chaired by the former Cabinet Secretary Lord O'Donnell.

Realising the need for incentives for public health academics to translate their research into practice, Shepherd initiated and sourced funding for a new professorship which he titled the Bazalgette Chair for Research Translation in honour of Sir Joseph Bazalgette who famously engineered the sewers which helped eradicate cholera in 19th Century London and in other cities. The, now annual, Bazalgette professorship was first awarded by the Faculty of Public Health in 2019. Prompted by the rapid, perplexing expansion across sectors of evidence production, synthesis and translation into guidance, and the economic impact of the COVID-19 pandemic, Shepherd wrote the 2020 report Evidence and Guidance for Better Public Services. Summarised in the science journal Nature and in Civil Service World, report recommendations include standardisation and proportionate regulation of the evidence ecosystem.

== Other research and impact ==
=== Cycle helmet design ===
Working with Michael Harrison, Shepherd mapped head and face injuries sustained by cyclists, and discovered that cycle helmet designs conferred little face protection. Their published recommendation that helmet design should change to incorporate this protection was taken up a Formula One engineer, Matthew Jeffreys, who designed and patented the Face Saver helmet and worked with the Formula One driver, David Coulthard, to manufacture and market this new product.

Coulthard exhibited the prototype at the 2002 UK Motor Show. This new design was instrumental in bringing about a new generation of helmet designs, especially in mountain and other sports cycling disciplines.

== Honours and awards ==
Shepherd was elected a fellow of the Academy of Medical Sciences in 2002. Shepherd is a member of the Home Office Science Advisory Council. In 2007, he was appointed a Commander of the Most Excellent Order of the British Empire for his services to justice and healthcare. He was one of two recipients of the 2008 Stockholm Prize in Criminology. His Violence Research Group won Cardiff University a 2009 Queen's Anniversary Prize. He is a recipient of the American Society of Criminology's Sellin-Glueck Award; the Royal College of Surgeons' Colyer Gold Medal, and the British Association of Oral and Maxillofacial Surgeons' Down Surgery Prize. He was the Royal College of Surgeons' Bradlaw Orator in 2014. He is an honorary fellow of the Royal College of Psychiatrists, the Royal College of Emergency Medicine, the Royal College of Surgeons of England, and the Faculty of Public Health of the UK Royal Colleges of Physicians. In 2011, Shepherd was elected a Fellow of the Learned Society of Wales.
