= Stockholm Prize in Criminology =

The Stockholm Prize in Criminology
- Awarded for: Outstanding achievements in research in the field of criminology
- Country: Sweden
- First award: 2006
- Website: Official site

The Stockholm Prize in Criminology is an international prize in the field of criminology, established under the aegis of the Swedish Ministry of Justice. It has a permanent endowment in the trust of the Stockholm Prize in Criminology Foundation. The Stockholm Prize in Criminology is a distinguished part of the Stockholm Criminology Symposium, an annual event taking place during three days in June.

The prize is awarded for outstanding achievements in criminological research or for the reduction of crime and the advancement of human rights.

The objectives of the Stockholm Prize in Criminology are to promote the development of:

- Improved knowledge of the causes of crime at an individual and structural level.
- More effective and humane public policies for dealing with criminal offenders.
- Better knowledge of alternative crime prevention strategies inside and outside the justice system.
- Policies for supporting the victims of crime.
- Better ways to reduce the global problem of illegal or abusive practices that may occur in the administration of justice.

According to reputation surveys conducted in 2013-2014 and 2018, the Stockholm Prize in Criminology is the most prestigious international academic award in the field of law.

== About the Prize ==
The Stockholm Prize in Criminology was presented for the first time in June 2006. The Prize sum amounts to 1,000,00 SEK and is awarded to one recipient annually, with the possibility of the prize being shared among up to two co-recipients. Each year, the independent Stockholm Prize Jury invites nominating bodies from around the world to suggest candidates for the prize. The Jury consists of members from five continents representing both practitioners and academics. The Stockholm Prize in Criminology is awarded by the Stockholm Prize in Criminology Foundation in cooperation with Stockholm University and the Swedish National Council for Crime Prevention (Brå).

== Stockholm Criminology Symposium ==
The Stockholm Criminology Symposium is an annual event which attracts some 500 attendees from all over the world. The Symposium is organized by the Swedish National Council for Crime Prevention on behalf of the Swedish government. During its thirteen-year long existence the Symposium has become a meeting point for researchers, policy-makers and practitioners who want to learn from the latest research findings of importance for crime policy.

== The Prize Award Ceremony ==
The Prize ceremony is held at the City Hall in central Stockholm in conjunction with the Stockholm Criminology symposium. The 2020 ceremony will be held on the evening of June 10 and is followed by a gala dinner in the Golden Hall.

== Prize winners ==
The first Stockholm Prize in Criminology was awarded in 2006. So far thirty scholars have received the prize:

- 2006 - John Braithwaite (Australia)
- 2006 - Friedrich Lösel (Germany)
- 2007 - Alfred Blumstein (USA)
- 2007 - Terrie E. Moffitt (USA)
- 2008 - David Olds (USA)
- 2008 - Jonathan Shepherd (United Kingdom)
- 2009 - John Hagan (USA)
- 2009 - Eugenio Raúl Zaffaroni (Argentina)
- 2010 - David Weisburd (Israel/USA)
- 2011 - John H. Laub (USA)
- 2011 - Robert J. Sampson (USA)
- 2012 - Jan van Dijk (Netherlands)
- 2013 - David P. Farrington (United Kingdom)
- 2014 - Daniel S. Nagin (USA)
- 2014 - Joan Petersilia (USA)
- 2015 - Ronald V. Clarke (United Kingdom/USA)
- 2015 - Patricia Mayhew (United Kingdom)
- 2016 - Travis Hirschi (USA)
- 2016 - Cathy Spatz Widom (USA)
- 2016 - Per-Olof H. Wikström (Sweden/United Kingdom)
- 2017 - Richard E. Tremblay (Canada/France/Ireland)
- 2018 - Herman Goldstein (USA)
- 2019 - Ruth Dreifuss (Switzerland)
- 2019 - Peter Reuter (USA)
- 2020 - Philip J. Cook (USA)
- 2020 - Franklin Zimring (USA)
- 2021 - Elijah Anderson (USA)
- 2022 - Peggy Giordano (USA)
- 2022 - Francis T. Cullen (USA)
- 2023 - Beatriz Magaloni (Mexico/USA)
- 2024 - Gary LaFree (USA)
- 2024 - Tom R. Tyler (USA)
- 2025 - Frances Crook (United Kingdom)
- 2025 - Bryan Stevenson (USA)
- 2026 - Mark W. Lipsey (USA)
- 2026 - Charis Kubrin (USA)
- 2027 - Anthony Braga (USA)
- 2027 - David M. Kennedy (USA)

== The Jury ==
The international independent jury consists of members representing both practitioners and academics. Today the Jury consists of following:

- Co-chair Jerzy Sarnecki, Professor Emeritus in General Criminology at Stockholm University, University of Gävle and Mid Sweden University, Sundsvall. Senior Professor at the University of Gävle and Mid Sweden University in Sundsvall, researcher at the Institute for Future Studies, Stockholm. (Sweden)
- Co-chair Lawrence Sherman,is Wolfson Professor of Criminology Emeritus at the University of Cambridge and Chief Scientific Officer of the Metropolitan Police in London, UK. Appointed Knight Commander of the Royal Order of the Northern Star (KNO) by King Carl XVI Gustav in 2016, he also holds honorary doctorates from Stockholm University, Sweden, and Denison University, USA. (UK/USA)
- Friedrich Lösel, Professor Emeritus, Institute of Psychology, University of Erlangen-Nuremberg, Germany & Past Director and Honorary Research Fellow, Institute of Criminology, University of Cambridge, UK. (Germany/UK)
- Tiyanjana Maluwa, H. Laddie Montague Chair in Law and Associate Dean for International Affairs at the Dickinson School of Law, and concurrently Director of the School of International Affairs, Pennsylvania State University, USA. (South Africa)
- Peter William Neyroud, CBE QPM, formerly Chief Constable and Chief Executive of the National Policing Improvement Agency, UK; Lecturer in Evidence-Based Policing, Institute of Criminology, University of Cambridge, UK. (UK)
- Hiroshi Tsutomi, Professor in the Faculty of International Relations at the University of Shizuoka, Japan. (Japan)
- David Weisburd, Distinguished Professor of Criminology, Law and Society, and Executive Director of the Center for Evidence Based Crime Policy at George Mason University in Virginia, USA; Walter E. Meyer Professor of Law and Criminal Justice in the Institute of Criminology of the Hebrew University Faculty of Law in Jerusalem, Israel. (USA/Israel)
- Susanne Karstedt, Professor in the School of Criminology and Criminal Justice at Griffith University, Australia. She held Chairs in Criminology at Keele University and the University of Leeds, UK, and positions at the Universities of Hamburg and Bielefeld, Germany. (Australia)
- Candace Kruttschnitt, Professor of Sociology, University of Toronto & Past President of the American Society of Criminology and Fellow, Royal Society of Canada. (Canada)
- Emil Plywaczewski, Professor, habilitated doctor (Law/Criminology); Doctor honoris causa, Dean of the Faculty of Law, University of Bialystok (Poland); Director: Department of Criminal Law and Criminology. Since 2017, Director of the International Centre of Criminological Research and Expertise, at the University of Białystok. He is also Full Professor at the Higher School of Police Training (Polish National Police Academy) in Szczytno, and elected Chair of the Scientific Board of the Professor Jan Sehn Institute of Forensic Expertise in Kraków. (Poland)
- Beatriz Abizanda, senior modernization of the State Specialist, Inter-American Development Bank, responsible for the Bank’s security programmes and technical cooperation in Costa Rica and Uruguay. (Costa Rica/Uruguay)

== The Stockholm Prize in Criminology Foundation ==
Initially, the Stockholm Prize in Criminology was financed through yearly private donations. However, given its success, and in order to secure its long-term financial viability, the Swedish Ministry of Justice and the Torsten Söderberg Foundation jointly decided to found a permanent, independent Foundation, the Stockholm Prize in Criminology Foundation. A major official grant was approved by the Swedish Riksdag in December 2011. The Torsten Söderberg Foundation, with the support of the Ragnar Söderberg Foundation, generously provided the necessary matching funds, as well as subsequent additional donations. The Jerry Lee Foundation, original donor to the Stockholm Criminology Prize, as well as the Tokyo-based Hitachi Mirai Foundation continued their support for the Prize as co-founders to the new Stockholm Prize in Criminology Foundation. Regular support is also received from the Japanese Correctional Association.

The Torsten Söderberg Foundation, founded in 1960 by Torsten and Wanja Söderberg and their sons, is dedicated to promoting scientific research and educational programs, primarily within the fields of economy, medicine and jurisprudence. Over the past ten years, the foundation has on average awarded grants in surplus of 100 million SEK per year. The donations to the Stockholm Prize in Criminology Foundation have been made in honour of Med. Dr h.c. Edvard Söderberg.

The Jerry Lee Foundation is dedicated primarily to reducing crime and enhancing education through research on what works to achieve these goals. The foundation is committed to solving social problems associated with poverty, especially in American inner cities that suffer from concentrated poverty. The foundation’s special concerns are elementary education and crime.

The Hitachi Mirai Foundation is engaged in a wide range of activities including the prevention of juvenile crime and delinquency, the enhancement of correctional and rehabilitation services for prison inmates and reform school students, and the promotion of social understanding and cooperation on issues involving young people.

Japanese Correctional Association is a Tokyo-based Public Interest Incorporated Foundation, committed to the public welfare activities. Their objectives are prevention of crime and delinquency through enlightenment of the general public on idea of correction and rehabilitation of offenders.

More information about the prize founders and donors is available on our website

== See also ==
- List of social sciences awards
