= Patricia Mayhew =

British criminologist and civil servant

Patricia Mayhew OBE is a British criminologist and civil servant. She was formerly the Deputy Head of the Crime and Criminal Justice Unit at the Home Office in the United Kingdom, as well as the director of the Crime and Justice Research Centre at the Victoria University of Wellington in New Zealand from 2004 to 2008. Her other positions include working at the National Institute of Justice in Washington, D. C., United States and the Australian Institute of Criminology in Canberra, Australia. She was one of the designers of the original International Crime Victims Survey in 1982, and managed the survey until 2000. She was named an Officer of the Order of the British Empire by Queen Elizabeth II in 1997, and was awarded the Stockholm Prize in Criminology jointly with fellow British criminologist Ronald V. Clarke in 2015, in honor of her and Clarke's work on situational crime prevention. She had also worked closely with Clarke in implementing the first British Crime Survey in 1982.
