= Psychology, Crime & Law =

- Discipline: Forensic psychology
- Language: English
- Edited by: Theresa Gannon

Publication details
- History: 1994-present
- Publisher: Taylor & Francis
- Frequency: 10/year
- Impact factor: 1.598 (2017)

Standard abbreviations
- ISO 4: Psychol. Crime Law

Indexing
- CODEN: PCLAE2
- ISSN: 1068-316X (print); 1477-2744 (web)
- LCCN: 93003794 sn 93003794
- OCLC no.: 779659769

Links
- Journal homepage; Online access; Online archive

Psychology, Crime & Law is a peer-reviewed academic journal covering forensic psychology. It was established in 1994 and is published 10 times per year by Taylor & Francis on behalf of the European Association of Psychology and Law, of which it is the official journal. The editor-in-chief is Theresa Gannon (University of Kent). According to the Journal Citation Reports, the journal has a 2017 impact factor of 1.598.
