= Colin Martindale =

American professor (1943–2008)

Colin Martindale (March 21, 1943 – November 16, 2008) was a professor of psychology at the University of Maine for 35 years.

Martindale studied creativity and artistic processes. His most popular work was The Clockwork Muse (1990), in which he argued that artistic development over time in written, visual, and musical works was the result of a search for novelty that could be quantified and studied to the point that art history could be treated as an experimental science.

Martindale was awarded the 1984 American Association for the Advancement of Science Prize for Behavioral Science Research.

== Bibliography ==
- Romantic Progression: The Psychology of Literary History, Hemisphere Pub., June 1, 1975, ISBN 978-0470573655
- Cognition and consciousness (The Dorsey series in psychology, Dorsey Press, 1981, ISBN 9780256024081
- The Clockwork Muse: The Predictability of Artistic Change, New York: Basic Books, 1990, ISBN 0465011861
- Evolutionary and neurocognitive approaches to aesthetics, creativity, and the arts, Amityville, NY: Baywood Pub., 2007, ISBN 0895033062
