= Per-Olof H. Wikström =

Swedish academic

Per-Olof H. Wikstrӧm
- Born: July 30, 1955 (age 70); Uppsala, SwedenStenebergsskolan (Gävle) Vasaskolans Gymnasium (Gävle) Stockholm University (BA 1976; PhD 1985; Docent 1988)
- Occupations: Professor of Developmental and Ecological Criminology
- Notable work: Urban crime, criminals and victims Breaking rules: The social and situational dynamics of young people’s urban crime

Per-Olof Helge Wikstrӧm (born July 30, 1955, in Uppsala, Sweden) is Professor of Ecological and Developmental Criminology at the University of Cambridge, Professorial Fellow of Girton College and Principal Investigator of the Peterborough Adolescent and Young Adult Development Study (PADS+), a major ESRC funded longitudinal study of young people in the UK which aims to advance knowledge about crime causation and prevention. His main research interests are developing a unified theory of the causes of crime (Situational Action Theory), testing it empirically and applying it to devising knowledge-based prevention policies. His work is internationally acknowledged, as demonstrated by his election as a Fellow of the American Society of Criminology in 2010 and a Fellow of the British Academy in 2011.

== Career ==
Research and teaching:

Wikström held teaching and research posts in the Department of Criminology at the Stockholm University from 1979 to 1990, where he served as Deputy Head of department from 1987 to 1990. During this time he was also a senior research officer for the Swedish National Council for Crime Prevention (1985-1990), and became the Director of the Research Department from 1990 to 1994. He returned to the Stockholm University as Adjunct Professor of the Sociology of Crime from 1993 to 1996, during which time he also worked as a Principal Research Fellow in the Swedish National Policing College's Research Unit (1995-1996). In 1997 he moved to the University of Cambridge becoming Professor of Ecological and Developmental Criminology in 2001.

Professional affiliations:

Wikström has been a Board Member of the Scandinavian Research Council for Criminology (1992–1997), the Scientific Commission of the International Society for Criminology (1995–1999), and the European Society of Criminology (2000–2001 and 2004–2005).

Main fellowships and awards:

Wikström received the University of Edinburgh Northern Scholars Award in 1991, and the Sellin-Glueck Award from the American Society of Criminology in 1994. He was awarded a Fellowship at the Center for Advanced Study in Behavioral Science at Stanford University in 2002, and was elected as a Fellow of the American Society of Criminology in 2010, and the British Academy in 2011.

In 2016, Wikström received the prestigious Stockholm Prize in Criminology for outstanding achievements in criminological research. In 2017 he was appointed Doctor Honoris Causa by the UNED (Spain) in recognition of his 'long academic career and extraordinary scientific contributions'.

== Biography ==
Wikström's contributions to the field of criminology include the development of original theory to tackle the causes of crime, the design of innovative research methods to study the social ecology of crime (increasingly recognized as an important but under-researched area in criminology), and the publication of groundbreaking new findings about the role of social contexts in acts of crime which he is currently developing into recommendations for policy and practice.

Early in his career, Wikström made significant scholarly contribution to the study of criminal careers, the social ecology of crime, the etiology of violence, and cross-national comparisons – accomplishments which earned him the American Society of Criminology's Thorsten Sellin and Sheldon and Eleanor Glueck Award in 1994 and a fellowship at the Center for Advanced Study in the Behavioral Sciences at Stanford University in 2002.

In recent years, Wikström has focused his energies on advancing multidisciplinary theory into the explanation of crime through Situational Action Theory (SAT). SAT represents one of the first attempts in the field of criminology to specify the situational mechanisms that link individual differences and behavioural contexts to specific acts of crime. At the core of SAT is the proposition that crime, which represents a form of moral rule-breaking (moral rules being rules, such as laws, that specify what it is right or wrong to do), is the outcome of an interaction between people with relevant personal characteristics (crime propensities – weak crime-relevant personal morality and a poor ability to exercise self-control) and settings with relevant (criminogenic) features (a weak moral context and poor enforcement). This interaction may lead certain people in certain settings to perceive crime as an action alternative (something they would consider doing), which they then choose to commit. SAT frames this situational perception-choice process against the backdrop of developmental processes which lead people and places to acquire crime-relevant characteristics, and selection processes which bring certain kinds of people and places together in space and time.

In a field where many prominent observers have highlighted the serious problems caused by theoretical fragmentation, the importance of this endeavor cannot be underestimated. SAT has gone head to head with other contemporary theories and established its unique contributions to the explanation of crime, including its clear and testable implications, its integration of individual and environmental levels of explanation, and its attention to crime as a form of moral rule-breaking.

To test this theory, Wikström has designed and implemented an ambitious, multilevel longitudinal study investigating key personal dimensions of young people; key social, environmental, spatial and temporal features of their activity fields; and their crime involvement; and how these change across adolescence and into adulthood. The Peterborough Adolescent and Young Adult Development Study (PADS+; see www.pads.ac.uk) is one of the largest and most successful longitudinal studies of crime ever undertaken in the UK, and the only one to empirically test cross-level interactions in the explanation of crime. PADS+ combines existing methodologies with innovative techniques designed to measure social environments and participants’ exposure to those environments, at a level of detail rarely attempted longitudinally across such a large sample. In particular, Wikström pioneered a new method of combining space-time budgets with small area ecometrics to study exposure to different social contexts and its relevance for crime involvement. This technique is now being replicated in studies around the world. Independent tests of SAT are also appearing and providing additional support for the theory.

Findings from these studies and PADS+ highlight the role of the social environment and the interaction between people and environments in young people's crime involvement. The book Breaking Rules provides a comprehensive overview of the rigorous study design, crime involvement and key relevant personal and social factors in a contemporary adolescent sample, and, for the first time ever in criminology, presents concrete evidence that crime occurs when (and only when) people with specific personal characteristics take part in settings with specific environmental features under specific circumstances. Wikström's study and innovative methods allow for the identification of environmental features which make settings criminogenic, and personal characteristics which make some people vulnerable, and others resistant, to those settings. These findings have critical implications for crime prevention.

== Education ==
- Stora Brynässkolan
- Stenebergsskolan
- Vasaskolans Gymnasium
- Stockholm University (BA 1976; PhD 1985; Docent 1988)

== Selected works ==
- Bouhana, N. & Wikström, P-O H. (2010). Theorizing terrorism: Terrorism as moral action - a scoping study. Contemporary Readings in Law and Social Justice, 2, 9-79.
- Bouhana, N. & Wikström, P-O H. (2011). Al Qa'ida-influenced radicalisation: A rapid evidence assessment guided by situational action theory. Counter terrorism research and analysis.
- Oberwittler, D. & Wikström, P-O H. (2009). Why small is better: Advancing the study of the role of behavioral contexts in crime causation. In: Weisburd, D., Bernasco, W. & Bruinsma, G. J. N. (eds.) Putting crime in its place: Units of analysis in geographic criminology. New York: Springer.
- Sampson, R. J. & Wikström, P-O H. (2008). The social order of violence in Chicago and Stockholm neighborhoods: A comparative inquiry. In: Kalyvas, S., Shapiro, I. & Masoud, T. (eds.) Order, conflict, and violence. New York, NY: Cambridge University Press
- Wikström, P-O H. (2004). Crime as alternative: Towards a cross-level situational action theory of crime causation. In: McCord, J. (ed.) Beyond empiricism: Institutions and intentions in the study of crime. New Brunswick, NJ: Transaction Publishers.
- Wikström, P-O H. (2005). The social origins of pathways in crime: Towards a developmental ecological action theory of crime involvement and its changes. In: Farrington, D. P. (ed.) Integrated developmental and life-course theories of offending. Advances in Criminological Theory, Volume 14. New Brunswick, NJ: Transaction Publishers.
- Wikström, P-O H. (2006). Individuals, settings, and acts of crime: Situational mechanisms and the explanation of crime. In: Wikström, P.-O. H. & Sampson, R. J. (eds.) The explanation of crime: Context, mechanisms and development. Cambridge: Cambridge University Press.
- Wikström, P-O H. (2010a). Explaining crime as moral actions. In: Hitlin, S. & Vaisey, S. (eds.) Handbook of the sociology of morality. New York: Springer Verlag.
- Wikström, P-O H. (2010b). Situational Action Theory. In: Cullen, F. & Wilcox, P. (eds.) Encyclopedia of criminological theory. London: Sage Publications.
- Wikström, P-O H. (2011a). Does everything matter? Addressing problems of causation and explanation in the study of crime. In: McGloin, J. M., Silverman, C. J. & Kennedy, L. W. (eds.) When crime appears: The role of emergence. New York, NY: Routledge.
- Wikström, P-O H. (2014). Why crime happens: A situational action theory. In: Manzo, G. (ed.) Analytical sociology: Actions and networks. West Sussex: Wiley.
- Wikström, P-O H. (2017) Character, Circumstances, and the Causes of Crime. In (Eds) Liebling A., Maruna S. & McAra L.: The Oxford Handbook of Criminology. Oxford. Oxford University Press.
- Wikström P-O H. & Bouhana N. (2016). Analysing radicalization and terrorism: A situational action theory. (EDS) LaFree G. & Freilich J. Handbook of the Criminology of Terrorism. Chichester. Wiley.
- Wikström, P-O H. & Butterworth, D. (2006). Adolescent crime: Individual differences and lifestyles. Cullompton, Willan Publishing.
- Wikström, P-O H., Ceccato, V., Hardie, B. & Treiber, K. (2010). Activity fields and the dynamics of crime: Advancing knowledge about the role of the environment in crime causation. Journal of Quantitative Criminology, 26, 55–87.
- Wikström, P-O H., Oberwittler, D., Treiber, K. & Hardie, B. (2012). Breaking rules: The social and situational dynamics of young people's urban crime. Oxford, Oxford University Press.
- Wikström, P-O H. & Sampson, R. J. (2003). Social mechanisms of community influences on crime and pathways in criminality. In: Lahey, B. B., Moffitt, T. E. & Caspi, A. (eds.) The causes of conduct disorder and serious juvenile delinquency. New York: Guildford Press.
- Wikström, P-O H. & Schepers, D. (2017): Situational Action Theory. In: Hermann, Dieter und Andreas Pöge (Eds.): Kriminalsoziologie. Handbuch für Wissenschaft und Praxis. Baden-Baden: Nomos, im Druck.
- Wikström, P-O H. & Svensson, R. (2010). When does self-control matter? The interaction between morality and self-control in crime causation. European Journal of Criminology, 7, 395–410.
- Wikström, P-O H. & Treiber, K. (2007). The role of self-control in crime causation. Beyond Gottfredson and Hirschi's General Theory of Crime. European Journal of Criminology, 4, 237–264.
- Wikström, P-O H. & Treiber, K. (2009). What drives persistent offending? The neglected and unexplored role of the social environment. In: Savage, J. (ed.) The development of persistent criminality. Oxford: Oxford University Press.
- Wikström, P-O H. & Treiber, K. (2015). Situational theories: The importance of interactions and action mechanisms in the explanation of crime. Handbook of criminological theory. A. R. Piquero. Hoboken, NJ, Wiley-Blackwell: 415–444.
- Wikström P-O H. & Treiber K. (2016) 'Social Disadvantage and Crime. A Criminological Puzzle'. American Behavioral Scientist 60:8.
- Wikström P-O H. & Treiber K. (2017). Beyond Risk Factors: An Analytical Approach to Crime Prevention. In (EDS) Teasdale B & Bradley M. S.: Preventing Crime and Violence, Advances in Prevention Science. Volume 2. New York. Springer verlag
- Wikström, P-O H. & Treiber, K. (in press). The dynamics of change: Criminogenic interactions and life course patterns in crime. The Oxford handbook of developmental and life course theories of crime. D. P. Farrington, Oxford University Press.
- Wikström, P-O H., Treiber, K. & Hardie, B. (2011a). Examining the role of the environment in crime causation: Small-area community surveys and space–time budgets. In: Gadd, D., Karstedt, S. & Messner, S. (eds.) The SAGE handbook of criminological research methods. London: Sage.
- Wikström, P-O H., Tseloni, A. & Karlis, D. (2011b). Do people comply with the law because they fear getting caught? European Journal of Criminology, 8, 401–420.
