= Investigative interviewing =

Investigative interviewing is a non-coercive method for questioning victims, witnesses and suspects of crimes. Generally, investigative interviewing "involves eliciting a detailed and accurate account of an event or situation from a person to assist decision-making". This interviewing technique is ethical and research based, and it stimulates safe and effective gathering of evidence. The goal of an investigative interview is to obtain accurate, reliable and actionable information. The method aims at maximising the likelihood of obtaining relevant information and minimise the risks of contaminating evidence obtained in police questioning. The method has been described as a tool for mitigating the use of torture, coercion and psychological manipulation, and for averting forced confessions and errors of justice leading to wrongful convictions and miscarriages of justice.

The term investigative interviewing was introduced in the UK in the early 1990s to represent a shift in police interviewing away from a confession oriented approach and towards evidence gathering. Traditionally, the main aim of an interrogation was to obtain a confession from a suspect in order to secure a conviction. Thus, investigative interviewing contrasts pervasive interrogations techniques aimed at making the suspect break down and confess. The stark difference between these two approaches to police interviewing has led some authors to argue that the term "interrogation" should be scrapped altogether as it is inherently coercive and aimed at obtaining a confession.

Much of the scientific base of investigative interviewing stems from social psychology and cognitive psychology, including studies of human memory. The method aims at mitigating the effects of inherent human fallacies and cognitive biases such as suggestibility, confirmation bias, priming and false memories. In order to conduct a successful interview the interviewer needs to be able to (1) create good rapport with the interviewee, (2) describe the purpose of the interview, (3) ask open-ended questions, and (4) be willing to explore alternative hypotheses. Before any probing questions are asked, the interviewees are encouraged to give their free, uninterrupted account.

In an interim report dated 5 August 2016, issued by special rapporteur Juan E. Méndez and addressed to the United Nations General Assembly, a best-practice approach for investigative interviewing methods was presented at length, which ultimately resulted in the publication of the Méndez Principles on Effective Interviewing in 2021.

Since the implementation of cognitive interviewing, this technique has undergone significant changes. These changes have enhanced the process of memory recall in various law enforcement investigations. (1) The development of structured protocols has made cognitive interviews more systematic. Beyond the rapport building, and open-ended questions, it encourages the witness to visualize the event enhancing memory recall. This structure helps reduce bias and increases the reliability of the information gathered. (2) Advancements in recording technology have allowed interviews to be documented more accurately. Video and audio recordings provide a reliable reference that can be reviewed later for analysis, ensuring that the details are not lost or misinterpreted. (3) Cognitive interview techniques have evolved for use with different populations, including children and individuals with cognitive impairments. Tailoring the approach to meet the needs of various witnesses ensures that all voices can be heard effectively. (4) Enhanced training programs for law enforcement personnel have been developed to ensure that interviewers are skilled in applying cognitive interview techniques. Standardized training helps maintain a high level of competency across different departments and regions. These improvements have contributed to making cognitive interviews a more effective tool in gathering accurate eyewitness testimonies, ultimately leading to better outcomes in investigations.

== By country ==
=== United Kingdom ===
The PEACE model (Preparation and Planning, Engage and Explain, Account, Closure and Evaluate) for police interviewing was developed in the United Kingdom in response to a number of documented forced confessions and associated wrongful convictions in the 1980s and 1990s. Most notable were the cases associated with the conflict (the Troubles) in Northern Ireland, and terrorism, such as the Birmingham Six and Guildford Four-cases.

=== Norway ===
Investigative interviewing was adapted by the Norwegian police in 2001. The acronym used for the training programme for the Norwegian police is KREATIV (or CREATIVE in English) and is composed of phrases reflecting the values and principles upon which the method is based. These are; Communication; Rule of Law; Ethics and empathy; Active awareness; Trust through openness/transparency; and Information. The "V" stands for Science ("Vitenskap" in Norwegian, "Wissenschaft" in German), referring to the method's foundation in research. Professor Ray Bull and DCI David Murthwaite (Merseyside Police) were brought from the UK to Norway to help train the trainers and initiate the programme. A module on how and when evidence should be disclosed during interviews with suspects was included, distinguishing it from the PEACE method.

=== New Zealand ===
The New Zealand Police published a practical tool and a compilation of literature on investigative interviewing in 2005 and underwent reforms to investigative interviewing both in policy and practice from 2007.
