= U.S. Bomb Data Center =

The U.S. Bomb Data Center serves as a nationwide collection center for information regarding arson and explosives related events throughout the United States. The Center was established in 1996 as a result of a congressional mandate and utilizes information from various government organizations such as the Bureau of Alcohol, Tobacco, Firearms and Explosives; the Federal Bureau of Investigation; and the United States Fire Administration.

== Mission ==
The mission of the Center covers a variety of topics, specifically:

- Provide statistics on arson and explosives, from federal, state, and local law enforcement agencies data.
- Maintain a database on arson and explosives investigations accessible to federal, state and local law enforcement.
- Compile data on trends and patterns.
- Assist with communication and corroboration on arson and explosives investigations.
- Preparing material to aid the identification of explosive material, and techniques used to perpetrate arson.

== History ==
In 1996, the United States Congress passed legislation ordering the United States Secretary of the Treasury to establish a National Repository of Information concerning arson incidents and the actual and suspected criminal misuse of explosives throughout the United States. The Secretary of the Treasury turned around and decided that the ATF was best suited for this job and handed over the responsibility. From there the ATF created the National Repository of Information, specifically in regards to incidents involving arson and the criminal misuse of explosive materials. The information that is gathered is available for a broad array of uses such as statistical analysis and research, investigative leads, and intelligence research. Historically, this center is staffed by ATF special agents, intelligence research specialists and support personnel who all possess a background in arson and explosives.

With the implementation of the Homeland Security Act of 2002, the responsibilities of the center were transferred from the United States Department of the Treasury to within the United States Department of Justice. Two years later in 2004, the United States Attorney General ordered the consolidation of all DOJ arson and explosives databases into what is now known as the Bomb Arson Tracking System (BATS).

== Explosives Tracing ==
According to the ATF's website, "tracing is the systematic tracking of explosives from manufacturer to purchaser (and/or possessor) for the purpose of aiding law enforcement officials in identifying suspects involved in criminal violations, establishing stolen status, and proving ownership." To trace these explosives, the manufacturers, importers, wholesalers, and retail dealers of explosive materials work in tandem with the ATF by providing specific information from their records of manufacture, importation, or sale. Furthermore, due to its unique responsibilities, the ATF is the only federal agency authorized access to these records due to its unique licensing authority.

== See also ==
- Bureau of Alcohol, Tobacco, Firearms and Explosives
- Federal Bureau of Investigation
- United States Fire Administration
- National Tracing Center
