= Aggression and Violent Behavior =

- Cover
- Discipline: Criminology
- Language: English
- Edited by: Vincent van Hasselt

Publication details
- History: 1996-present
- Publisher: Elsevier
- Frequency: Bimonthly
- Impact factor: 4.874 (2021)

Standard abbreviations
- ISO 4: Aggress. Violent Behav.

Indexing
- CODEN: AVBEFZ
- ISSN: 1359-1789
- LCCN: 96640730
- OCLC no.: 644028319

Links
- Journal homepage; Online archive

Aggression and Violent Behavior is a bimonthly peer-reviewed scientific journal covering the study of violent behavior. It was established in 1996 and is published by Elsevier. The editor-in-chief is Izabela Zych (Universidad de Córdoba).

== Abstracting and indexing ==
The journal is abstracted and indexed in:

- Current Contents/Social & Behavioral Sciences
- Social Sciences Citation Index
- Sociological Abstracts
- Scopus

According to the Journal Citation Reports, the journal has a 2021 impact factor of 4.874.
