= Center for Problem-Oriented Policing =

Policing institute

- Abbreviation: CPOP
- Formation: 1999
- Type: Nonprofit organization
- Services: Police training, issuing guidelines on specific policing-related problems
- Fields: Criminal justice
- Director: Michael Scott
- Associate director: Ronald V. Clarke
- Associate director: Graeme R. Newman
- Parent organization: Arizona State University
- Website: www.popcenter.org

The Center for Problem-Oriented Policing (CPOP) is an American research center and nonprofit organization dedicated to studying and advancing problem-oriented policing.

It was established in 1999 at the University at Albany, with funding from the Department of Justice's Office of Community Oriented Policing Services. The center currently operates out of the School of Criminology and Criminal Justice at Arizona State University.

The organization consists of police practitioners, universities, and scholars studying modern policing methods. It acts as a major clearinghouse for law enforcement strategies, producing "Problem-Specific Guides" utilized by institutions such as the RAND Corporation and the National Institute of Justice. The center also administers the annual Herman Goldstein Award for Excellence in Problem-Oriented Policing.
