= Crime concentration =

Spatial area with high crime incidents

A Crime concentration is a spatial area to which high levels of crime incidents are attributed. A crime concentration can be the result of homogeneous or heterogeneous crime incidents. Hotspots are the result of various crimes occurring in relative proximity to each other within predefined human geopolitical or social boundaries. Crime concentrations are smaller units or set of crime targets within a hotspot. A single or a conjunction of crime concentrations within a study area can make up a crime hotspot.

Some of the early works in crime analysis aimed to identify hotspots of crime within big regions. These regions could extend as large as states, counties, a group of counties, cities, neighborhoods and police beats. The aim of this approach was to focus on large areas, rather than specific addresses or locations hosting crime events as part of a larger environment. This is important because not all locations are equal generators of crime and not all provide equal opportunity for offenders to conduct criminal activity. Thus, crime concentrations are smaller groups of crime uniformly or randomly distributed within a hotspot's geographical domain; this is because not all hotspots have the same crime composition and patterns. In other words, a hotspot can be composed by multiple layers of crime intensity. Thus, each one has its own variations or rhythms of crime distribution. Therefore, it is each hotspot's composition that dictates what measures need to be employed as crime reduction strategies.

Hotspots are the foundation of crime concentrations because it is from the hotspot's earlier theories and studies that the analysis of crime concentration was derived. Hotspots can be expressed in the form of dots, lines or polygons and even shades of color as in the case of kernel density which estimates the likelihood of a crime event occurring within a given region; this is done through crime mapping which refers to the allocation of individual or multiple crime incidents on a map by utilizing a computer software package such as ArcMap 10.1, a Geographic information system. The different forms of hotspots and consequently crime concentrations are studied and explained by various theories and measured by several spatial and temporal analysis techniques. These techniques generally rely on statistical algorithms for the creation of surface maps. One of predominant theories that explains crime congregations is Crime opportunity theory. It explains that "rather than concentrations of offenders or the absence of social controls, opportunity theories suggest that analysts should look for concentrations of crime targets". Repeat victimization%20theory Victimisation victimization theory examines why some areas or targets are repeatedly victimized. Broken windows theory also explains that an area that becomes abandoned or if the guardians and managers cease to be in control of an establishment, then other guardians and managers become less motivated to enforce social controls, consequently allowing criminal activity to increase. Lastly, one of the most influential crime concentration theories is the Crime Place Theory because it focuses on criminal events on specific locations rather than a large view at the high crime density area.

== Crime concentrations: critical developments and respective key concepts ==
=== Kernel density ===
Kernel density is a computer based analysis through the usage of geographic information systems employed for the purpose of measuring crime intensity. It takes the map of the area being studied as the basis for analysis then it proceeds to divide the total area or map into smaller grid cells. The size of those grid cells can be selected by the analyst accordingly to the research questions under study or the indented applications. Each cell grid has a center point. Also, it is necessary for the analyst to select a bandwidth. This bandwidth is essentially a search radius from the center of each map grid. When the analysis is run the bandwidth searches the number of crimes reported within each cell. A greater amount crimes located closer to the cell center indicate higher crime intensity. If cells are found to possess high crime intensity rates then they are assigned high values.

Every cell grid in the map is assigned a value. This results in a continues map, a map of a city under the jurisdiction of a given police department for example. This map portraits the crime incidents data or intensity in the form of shades of colors for each grid throughout the area of study. Every part of the map has cells thus every part of the map has intensity value. Therefore, after conducting the kernel density analysis, it can be determine if grid cells with high crime intensity values are clustered together and thus forming a crime hotspot. The cells that possess higher intensity values within the crime hotspots only show the crime density but cannot be further analyze in order to locate the spatial coverage of crime concentrations. The ability to manipulate cell and bandwidth sizes permits analyst to use kernel density for conducting analysis at a small scope level within a crime hotspot.

=== Hotspot Matrix ===
The Hotspot Matrix was pioneered by Jerry H. Ratcliffe. It is the analysis of hotspots; however, unlike conventional analysis, it is not limited to the examination of hotspots as a mere geographical location. In addition to the implementation of spatial analysis techniques such as kernel density, LISA or STAC; it uses an aoristic analysis for which "The basic premise is that if a time of an event is not known, then the start and end time can be used to estimate a probability matrix for each crime event for each hour of the day". Therefore, the hotspot matrix is the combination of both spatial and temporal characteristics pertaining to hotspots in order to determine crime concentration patterns within a high crime intensity area.

Ratcliffe divided the hotspot matrix as having spatial and temporal attributes. The spatial attributes of a hotspot are: Hotpoint referring to a specific place from which a high volume of crimes are generated. The Clustered is geographical characteristic and representation of hotspots where crimes are concentrated with greater density in various areas in the location being studied. Dispersed crimes are those that are distributed across the study region without formulating major clusters of crimes; it is the closest form of random distribution of crimes in a hotspot. Ratcliffe also introduced the idea of temporal characteristics of crime. Diffused are hotspots where crimes are likely to happen at any time and there is not a specific window of time for crime incidents. Focused describes a phenomenon where crimes are likely to occur within a hotspot through the day, week, month(s) with greater intensity over a set of small windows of time. Acute pertains to hotspots experiencing the vast majority of incidents in a very small time frame; crime incidents outside that time frame are still possible, but nearly nonexistent. These are the six broad categories attributed to the hotspot matrix. These categories can be utilized to identify the areas within administrative boundaries with greater crime intensities. It also facilitates the identification of the type hotspot in the region. After the major crime areas become known, consequently, they can be isolated by the analyst in order to examine them to a closer level.

== Crime concentration empirical support ==
=== Empirical study 1 (Chicago) ===
Crime and Place: Hot Spot Areas and Hot Spot Places of Liquor-Related Crime

Loyola Community Safety Project was assembled to investigate the potential relationship between taverns and other local licensed businesses whose primary or partial source of income rely the sales of alcoholic beverages in the area of Roger Park & Edgewater communities in the city of Chicago. This initiative was the result the collaboration of many community groups due to the increasing rates of drug and violent crimes in the region. The researchers had access to the equivalent of a geodatabase, which essentially functions as a big folder with the capabilities of storing multiple files such as aerial photographs or any other file capable of depicting geographical information. This geodatabase was compiled from records of police departments and other community groups; it contained data in the form of street addresses of establishments that sell alcohol. This information was stored as software files on a computer; this enabled the analysis, the geocoding and the output of the community maps.

The researchers proceeded to compile a list of all businesses in the area of study holding a liquor sales license. The researchers limited themselves from defining Taverns as the source of the crimes. Instead, they included in their study population every business with a liquor license. This facilitated the inclusion of business that do not fit the category of a Tavern in areas with higher poverty levels, but nevertheless serve the same function.

The researchers initiated geocoding which associates an address in the real world to a map – both the addresses of the several types of liquor selling establishments and the crimes that had occurred in places where liquor beverages are sold. The crimes geocoded varied in nature and ranged from disorderly conduct to felonies. After both the crimes and establishments had been geocoded, the maps were overlaid. This facilitated the identification of liquor places with the greater number of crimes within their location or their vicinity.

Some of the limitations in the study were that a high level of coordinates did not match. This was because the raw data was collected by various agencies and for different purposes. The method of analysis was to calculate the hotspot ellipses through the implementation of Spatial and Temporal Analysis of Crime (STAC). Eck and Weisburb (1995) define the process of how STAC works “STAC hot spot area searches begin with individual pin map data and build areas that reflect the actual scatter of events, regardless of arbitrary or predefined boundaries. STAC finds the densest clusters of events in the map and calculates the standard deviational ellipse that best fits each cluster.” (p. 154). It was determined that the number of liquor stores and liquor related businesses were not randomly dispersed in the area. They were generally located in clusters along major roads. This supports the idea that hotspots may contain different arrangements of crime. After the hotspots were identified by the researchers, they continued to examine the hotspots arrangement and took a look at some specific address level crime concentrations. The study found that high concentrations of taverns or liquor stores do not necessarily produce high levels of crime. It concluded that there were places that were responsible for higher levels of crime than others. Therefore, not all crime concentrations are equally generators of crime. Some crime places have environmental cues that facilitate the occurrence and sustainment of crime victimization.

=== Empirical study 2 (Boston) ===
Mapping Gangs and Gang Violence in Boston

This study was designed to reduce youth violence and gun markets in Boston. This was a collaboration of Harvard University researchers, Boston Police Department, probation officers and other city employees that had some level of experience when dealing with young offenders or youth vulnerable to violence. The group initiated a multi-agency study under the perception that a high density of gangs were operating in the area of interest or the city of Boston. It was assumed that youth violence was the direct product of gangs involvement almost in every youth violence incident. Some gang members were interviewed and it was learned that many did not classify themselves as gangs or gang members.

Researchers with the help of gang and patrol officer identify the areas of operation pertaining to each gang or information was also acquired from gang members. Each area was highlighted on a printed map; this facilitated the identification of gang-controlled territory. The next step was to go on to hand digitizing the gang territories into a software based map. Through this process, it was discovered that the gang areas of operation were unevenly distributed. Gang territory accounted for less than 10% of Boston.

Data of violent crimes that were confirmed or likely to have been committed by gangs were geocoded and matched with the gang territorial map. This data was obtained from the Boston Police Department for the year of 1994. It is through geocoding and the overlapping the gang territorial map that major concentrations of crime were identified. The ratios of violence incidents were significantly higher under gang areas of operations in contrast to areas free of gang presence. However, not all gangs were equal generators crime or practitioners of the same criminal offenses. Additionally, STAC program was utilize to create hotspot ellipses in order to measure the crime distribution density. It reinforced the previous results that some gangs’ territory experience the higher rates of crime. The crime hotspots located in the regions could then be further analyzed for its unique crime concentration pattern.

=== Randomized Controlled Trials ===
The Center For Evidence-Based Crime Policy in George Mason University identifies the following randomized controlled trials of hot spot policing as very rigorous.

Authors	Study	Intervention	Results
Braga, A. A., & Bond, B. J.	"Policing crime and disorder hot spots: A randomized, controlled trial", 2008	Standard hot spot policing	Declines for disorder calls for service in target hot spots.
Hegarty, T., Williams, L. S., Stanton, S., & Chernoff, W.	"Evidence-Based Policing at Work in Smaller Jurisdictions", 2014	Standard hot spot policing	Decrease in crimes and calls for service across all hot spots during the trial. No statistically significant difference in crimes found between the visibility and visibility-activity hot spots.
Telep, C. W., Mitchell, R. J., & Weisburd, D.	"How Much Time Should the Police Spend at Crime Hot Spots? Answers from a Police Agency Directed Randomized Field Trial in Sacramento, California", 2012	Standard hot spot policing	Declines in calls for service and crime incidents in treatment hot spots.
Taylor, B., Koper, C. S., Woods, D. J.	"A randomized controlled trial of different policing strategies at hot spots of violent crime.", 2011	Three-arms trial with control, standard hot spot policing and problem-oriented policing group. Problem oriented policing is a policing tactic where the police works in teams that include a crime analyst to target the root causes of crime.	Standard hot spot policing was not associated with a significant decline in crime after the intervention. Problem-oriented policing was associated with a drop in "street violence" (non-domestic violence) during the 90 days after the intervention.
Rosenfeld, R., Deckard, M. J., Blackburn, E.	"The Effects of Directed Patrol and Self-Initiated Enforcement on Firearm Violence: A Randomized Controlled Study of Hot Spot Policing", 2014	Directed patrol and directed patrol with additional enforcement activity	Directed patrol alone had no impact on firearm crimes. Directed patrol with additional enforcement activity led to reduction in non-domestic firearm assaults but no reduction in firearm robberies.
Sherman, L. & Weisburd, D.	"General deterrent effects of police patrol in crime "hot spots": a randomized, controlled trial", 1995	Directed patrol	Decrease in observed crimes in hot spots.
Groff, E. R., Ratcliffe, J. H., Haberman, C. P., Sorg, E. T., Joyce, N. M., Taylor, R. B.	"Does what police do at hot spots matter? The Philadelphia Policing Tactics Experiment", 2014	Four arms trial with control, foot patrol, problem-oriented policing and offender-focused policing groups. Offender-focused policing is a policing tactic where the police targets the most prolific and persistent offenders.	Foot patrols or problem-oriented policing did not lead to a significant reduction in violent crime or violent felonies. Offender-oriented policing led to reduction in all violent crime and in violent felonies.
Ratcliffe, J., Taniguchi, T., Groff, E. R., Wood, J. D.	"The Philadelphia Foot Patrol Experiment: A randomized controlled trial of police patrol effectiveness in violent crime hotspots", 2011	Foot patrol	Significant decrease in crime in hot spots that reach a threshold level of pre-intervention violence.
Weisburd, D., Morris, N., & Ready, J.	"Risk-focused policing at places: An experimental evaluation", 2008	Community policing and problem-oriented policing targeting juvenile risk factors	No impact on self-reported delinquency.
Braga, A. A., Weisburd, D. L, Waring, E. J., Mazerolle, L. G., Spelman, W., & Gajewski, F.	"Problem-oriented policing in violent crime places: A randomized controlled experiment", 1999	Problem-oriented policing-problem places	Reductions in violent and property crime, disorder and drug selling.
Buerger, M. E. (ed.)	"The crime prevention casebook: Securing high crime locations.", 1994	Problem-oriented policing	Unable to get landlords to restrict offender access.
Koper, C., Taylor, B. G., & Woods, D.	"A Randomized Test of Initial and Residual Deterrence From Directed Patrols and Use of License Plate Readers at Crime Hot Spots", 2013	License plate recognition software at hot spots	Effective in combating auto-theft, the effect lasts 2 weeks after the intervention.
Lum, C., Merola, L., Willis, J., Cave, B.	"License plate recognition technology (LPR): Impact evaluation and community assessment", 2010	Use of license plate readers mounted on patrol cars in autotheft hot spot areas	No impact on auto crime or crime generally.

== Criticism ==
There are various methods for the identification and/or establishment of emerging geographical locations experiencing high levels of crime concentrations and hotspots. A commonly used method for this process is the implementation of kernel density; this method depicts the probability of an event occurring; in criminology it refers to crime incidents. This probability is often measured as a Mean and expressed in the form of density on a surface map. A disadvantage in this approach is that in order to obtain the different degrees of intensity, the map is subdivided into several grid cells. Therefore, the final map output have multiple cells with their own respective crime density degrees which facilitate the comparison between hotspots vs hotspots and places with relative low levels of crime. However, there is not finite line highlighting the begging and the exact end of each hotspot and its respective set or individual crime concentrations. This is assuming that the criminal incidents are not evenly distributed across the space within the hotspot. Also, every grid cell has the same crime density within it; therefore, it is difficult to know the exact crime pattern within each cell. One way in which the analysts can handle these set of potential deficiencies is by adjusting the grid cells size on the digital map so they can represent a smaller spatial area on the actual ground. Also, the kernel density map can be overlaid with a dot map for which the crime incidents have been geocoded. This method will enable the analysts to corroborate his/her results by having two analysis of the same area. The kernel density map can be used to identify the spatial area that constitutes the hotspot. After Zooming in to the map, the dot map will enable to identify the individual crime distribution pertaining to each hotspot or even to each cell. Ultimately, this allows for an analysis of blocks, street and specific locations and their spatial relationship to crimes in their surroundings.

A potential deficiency in crime concentration analysis and hotspot identification techniques is that crime analysts generally are limited to analyze data collected from their own law enforcement agency. The collection of this data is limited by administrative and geopolitical lines. Crimes are not contained within social boundaries. These boundaries might restrict the analyst from looking at the entire crime picture. Therefore, by only analyzing within a police department's jurisdiction the researcher might be unable to study the actual or miss the root of the crime concentration due to a partial access of the natural flow of crime that is not restricted by geographical lines.

It is important to know the limitations of each analysis techniques. Thus, it is fundamental to know that some techniques do not include temporal characteristics of crime concentrations or crime incidents. One of the future developments in the analysis of crime concentrations should be the inclusion of time at which the incidents occurred. This will enable to create a hotspot in motion rather than static pictures that only capture one moment in time or portraits all crime incidents as if there exist no difference between the time of each crime's occurrence.

== Crime prevention implications ==
Identification of hotspots and consequently crime concentrations enables law enforcing agencies to allocate their human and financial resources effectively. Detecting areas experiencing abnormally high crime densities provide empirical support to police chiefs or managers for the establishment and justification of policies and counter crime measures. It is through this method of crime analysis that areas with greater rates of victimization within a law enforcement's jurisdiction can receive greater amounts of attention and therefore problem solving efforts.

The crime analyst can utilize one of the various spatial analytical techniques for spotting the crime concentration areas. After the spatial extend of these hot areas are defined, it is possible to formulate research questions, apply crime theories and opt the course(s) of action to address the issues being faced; therefore, preventing their potential spatial or quantitative proliferation. One example would be asking why a particular area is experiencing high levels of crime and others are not. This could lead the analyst to examine the hotspot at a much deeper level in order to become aware of the hotspot's inner crime incidents placement patterns, randomization or to examine the different clusters of crime. Because not all places are equal crime generators, individual facilities can be further analyzed in order to establish their relationship to other crimes in their spatial proximity. Similarly, every crime concentration analysis is essentially a snapshot of a given number of criminal acts distributed throughout a geographical area. Thus, crime concentrations analyses can be compared throughout different time periods such as specific days of the week, weeks, and dates of the month or seasons. For example, crime snapshots of block Z are compared every Friday over the course of 3 months. Through this comparison, it is determined that 85% of the Fridays during the length of the study; block Z experienced abnormally high levels of burglaries in one specific place in Block. Based on this, a Crime prevention through environmental design approach can be taken.

The analyst can then study the specific location and determine the factors that make that facility prone to repeat victimization and a crime facilitator. Also, the analyst could discover that there exist a relationship between the place on block Z and the crime offenders. Or it could be discovered that the place managers or guardians are not fulfilling their duties correctly. Therefore, neglecting the crime target and enabling crime flourishment. It is also possible, that the crime target's physical design and characteristics, plus the nature of the businesses it conducts regularly attract or provide actual and potential offenders in the area some crime opportunities.

In addition, objects taken from the premises as part of the burglaries might be easily accessible or promote low risks of being apprehended. This could be further fortified by or as the application of the crime opportunity theory. All of this is made possible due to identification of hotspot and their respective crime concentrations. Plus the further employment of Ratcliffe's hotspot matrix which depicts the crime concentration patterns within hotspots. Also, his perspective of zooming in to hotspot to examine specific crime generators in order to analyze their spatial and temporal relationship to other crimes in the area of study.

== Sources ==
- Block, R. (Loyola University Chicago), & Block, C. (Illinois Criminal Justice Information Authority) "Space, Place and Crime: Hot Spot Areas and Hot Spot Places of Liquor-Related Crime". Department of Sociology, Loyola University Chicago.
- Crowe, T. (2000). "Crime Prevention Through Environmental Design". Woburn, MA: National Crime Prevention Institute.
- Eck, J. & Weisburd, D. (1995). "Crime and Place" Monsey, New York: Criminal Justice Press, Volume 4.
- Eck, J., Chainey, S., Cameron, J., Leitner, M. & Wilson, R. (2005). "Mapping Crime: Understanding Hot Spots.". National Institute of Justice. Retrieved November 3, 2012.
- Eck, J., Clarke, R and Guerrete, R. (2007). "Risky Facilities: Crime Concentration in Homogeneous Sets of Establishments and Facilities". Crime Prevention Studies, volume 21 (2007), pp. 225–264. Retrieved November 3, 2012.
- Felson, M. (2006). Crime and Nature. California: Sage Publications. ISBN 9780761929109
- Kennedy, D., Braga, A., & Piehl, A. (1997). "The (Un)known Universe: Mapping Gangs and Gang Violence in Boston". Harvard University. Retrieved November 4, 2012.
- Ratcliffe, J. (2004). "The Hotspot Matrix: A Framework for the Spatio-Temporal Targeting of Crime Reduction". Police Practice and Research. Vol. 5, No. 1, March 2004, pp. 05–23. Retrieved November 18, 2014.
- Ratcliffe, J. (2010). (Original article). "The spatial dependency of crime increase dispersion". Macmillan Publishers Retrieved November 17, 2014.
