= Devon Polaschek =

New Zealand professor of psychology

Devon Polaschek MNZM
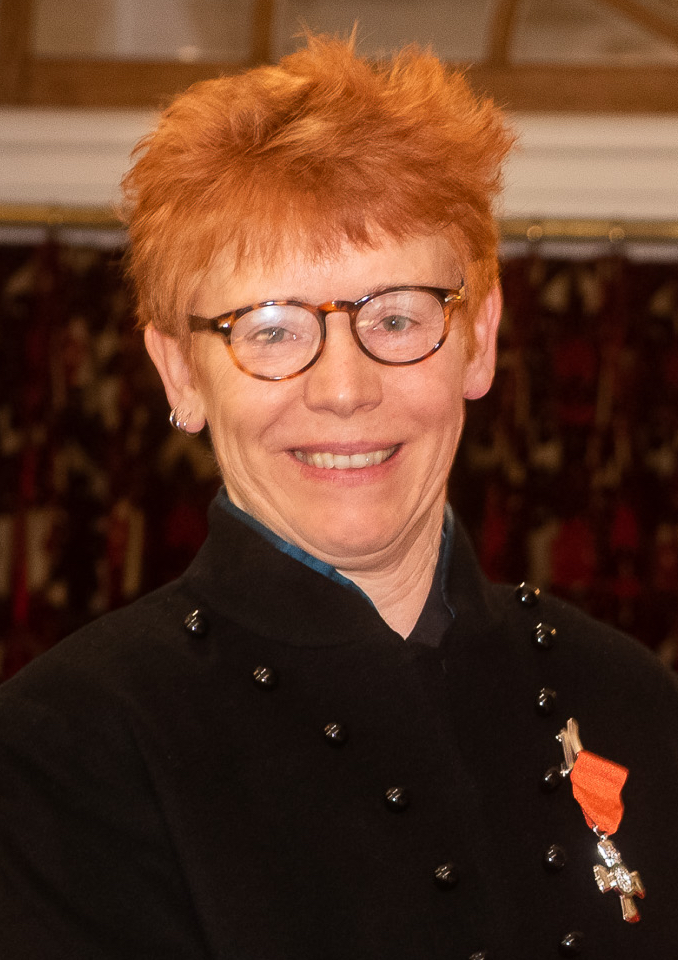
- Polaschek in 2019
- Education: Victoria University of Wellington
- Scientific career
- Fields: psychology of sexual offenders
- Workplaces: Victoria University of Wellington, University of Waikato
- Thesis: A descriptive model of the offence chain for rapists (1999)

Devon Leigh Logan Polaschek MNZM is a New Zealand professor of psychology and of security and crime science at the University of Waikato in New Zealand who studies theory, intervention, and intervention evaluation with serious violent and sexual offenders.

In 2011, Polaschek spoke at the University of Otago about recidivism and about the myth that offenders cannot be treated. In 2014 she published an article dispelling the myths about psychopathy and argued that people with high levels of psychopathic traits can be successfully treated using the risk, need, and responsivity principles of effective correctional treatment. She also said that psychopaths who had many previous convictions can become worse after poorly implemented treatment.

Having previously been with Victoria University of Wellington, Polaschek moved to the University of Waikato in December 2016 and gave her inaugural lecture on 30 May 2017. She was the Director of Te Puna Haumaru Centre for Security and Crime Science at the University of Waikato between 2018 and 2025.

In the 2019 Queen's Birthday Honours, Polaschek was appointed a Member of the New Zealand Order of Merit, for services to criminal psychology.

== Selected works ==
- Ward, Tony, Devon Polaschek, and Anthony R. Beech. Theories of sexual offending. John Wiley & Sons, 2006.
- Skeem, Jennifer L., Devon LL Polaschek, Christopher J. Patrick, and Scott O. Lilienfeld. "Psychopathic personality: Bridging the gap between scientific evidence and public policy." Psychological Science in the Public Interest 12, no. 3 (2011): 95–162.
- Skeem, Jennifer L., Jennifer Eno Louden, Devon Polaschek, and Jacqueline Camp. "Assessing relationship quality in mandated community treatment: Blending care with control." Psychological assessment 19, no. 4 (2007): 397.
- Polaschek, Devon LL, and Tony Ward. "The implicit theories of potential rapists: What our questionnaires tell us." Aggression and violent behavior 7, no. 4 (2002): 385–406.
- Garry, Maryanne, and Devon LL Polaschek. "Imagination and memory." Current Directions in Psychological Science 9, no. 1 (2000): 6–10.
