= European Association of Psychology and Law =

- Abbreviation: EAPL
- Formation: 1992
- Founded at: Oxford, United Kingdom
- Region served: Europe
- Members: approx. 300 (2007)
- President: Ray Bull
- Secretary: Robert Horselenberg
- Website: eapl.eu

The European Association of Psychology and Law (abbreviated EAPL) is a learned society dedicated to developing and promoting research at the intersection of psychology and law, with a special focus on Europe. It was established in 1992 at the third European Conference on Psychology and Law in Oxford, United Kingdom. The resolution to found the association was made at the second such conference in 1990, of which Friedrich Losel was the chair. The association's official journal, Psychology, Crime & Law, was founded in 1994 and soon became affiliated with the association.

== Presidents ==
The following is a list of presidents of the EAPL:

- Friedrich Lösel (1992–97)
- David P. Farrington (1997–2000)
- Frans-Willem Winkel (2000–03)
- Graham Davies (2003–06)
- Peter van Koppen (2006–09)
- David Cooke (2009–12)
- Pär Anders Granhag (2012–15)
- Ray Bull (2014–present)
