= Mary Ann Nevins Radzinowicz =

American scholar of English literature (1925–2023)

- Born: Mary Ann Nevins; April 18, 1925; Illinois, U.S.
- Died: March 15, 2023 (aged 97); Ballyvaughan, County Clare, Ireland
- Occupations: Academic and scholar
- Children: 2
- Awards: Fulbright Scholarship Guggenheim Fellowship

Academic background
- Education: Radcliffe College, Columbia University

Academic work
- Discipline: English Literature scholar
- Sub-discipline: 17th century English Literature
- Institutions: Girton College, Cambridge. University of Cambridge. Cornell University
- Main interests: John Milton, 17th century English literature
- Notable works: Toward Samson Agonistes: The Growth of Milton's Mind, Milton's Epics and the Book of Psalms

Mary Ann Nevins Radzinowicz (April 18, 1925 – March 15, 2023) was an American academic and scholar of English literature. She was a leading authority on John Milton and 17th century English literature. She was Jacob Gould Schurman Professor of English Literature Emerita at Cornell University.

== Career ==
Radzinowicz read English at Radcliffe College and took her M.A. and PhD degrees at Columbia University. She was awarded two Fulbright Scholarships to attend the University of Cambridge, where she took a further M. A. degree. She was a Fellow of Girton College, Cambridge and lecturer in English at the University of Cambridge for 20 years. From 1980, she was Jacob Gould Schurman Professor of English Literature at Cornell University where she specialised in literary criticism in a historical context.

== Personal life and death ==
While working in Cambridge she married in 1958 Sir Leon Radzinowicz, Wolfson Professor of Criminology at Cambridge and founder of the Cambridge Institute of Criminology. They divorced in 1979. As her husband was knighted in 1970, she was formally Lady Radzinowicz. Their two children live and work in London.

Radzinowicz retired in 1990 and moved with her partner, Irish writer Sarah Poyntz, to Ballyvaughan, County Clare, Ireland. Poyntz died in 2020, and she died there on March 15, 2023, at the age of 97.

== Works ==
Her best known-book is the magisterial Toward Samson Agonistes: The Growth of Milton's Mind (1978); it was followed by Milton's Epics and the Book of Psalms (1989), both published by Princeton University Press. She has also written scholarly articles including the influential "Milton and the Tragic Women of Genesis" in 1995. She has also edited a number of books including American Colonial Prose: John Smith to Thomas Jefferson (1984, Cambridge University Press). She is most associated with her work on Milton and 17th century English literature.

== Awards and honours ==
Radzinowicz was awarded the Guggenheim Fellowship in 1982 for her research on Milton's epics and the Book of Psalms: the fellowship is awarded to those "who have demonstrated exceptional capacity for productive scholarship or exceptional creative ability in the arts".

In 1987 the Milton Society of American named her an Honored Scholar.

In 2012, she was honoured with a Festschrift, Milton's Rival Hermeneutics: 'Reason Is But Choosing' (edited by Richard J. DuRocher and Margaret Olofson Thickstun, Duquesne University Press, 2012).
