= Manuel Eisner =

British criminologist

Manuel Eisner is Wolfson Professor of Criminology at the University of Cambridge, and Deputy Director of the Cambridge Institute of Criminology. He researches the history of interpersonal violence, and has conducted a study on levels of homicide throughout Europe over a period of 800 years. His research has highlighted the ways in which cultural models of conduct of life, embedded in social institutions, have shaped patterns of daily behaviour among adolescent and young adult men, which in turn have influenced the likelihood of frictions leading to aggressive behaviour. He is also recognised for his studies on the developmental causes of crime and delinquency and advocates the effectiveness of early prevention during childhood. Recent projects include the Medieval Murder Map with Stephanie Brown, and the Evidence for Better Lives, a global birth-cohort study in eight cities across the world.

== Career and work ==
Eisner's work on the very long-term trends in violence are often cited. He has summarised the patterns from some 350 historical studies. To find out more about his research projects, visit https://www.vrc.crim.cam.ac.uk/vrcresearch

== Awards ==
- 2001 Elected Chair of the National Research Program “Right-wing Extremism: Causes and Countermeasures” by the Swiss National Science Foundation
- 2007 Fellow of the Academy of Experimental Criminology
- 2011 Recipient of Sellin-Glueck Award, American Society of Criminology
- 2017 Recipient of the European Criminology Award ESC for Lifetime Achievement
- 2021 Jerry Lee Lifetime Achievement Award, the American Society of Criminology's Division of Experimental Criminology
