= WCSO =

WCSO can refer to:

- the University of Cambridge Philharmonic Orchestra, formerly known as the "West Cambridge Symphony Orchestra"
- WCSO (FM), an FM radio station located in Columbus, Mississippi
- the Will County Sheriff's Office, the principal law enforcement agency that serves Will County, Illinois
- WCSO (AM), radio station licensed to Springfield, Ohio, that consolidated with an Akron, Ohio, radio station in 1930 to form WGAR (AM), now WHKW
