= Anthony Bottoms =

British criminologist

Sir Anthony Edward Bottoms FBA (born 29 August 1939) is a British criminologist. He is life fellow at Fitzwilliam College, Cambridge, having previously been a Wolfson Professor of Criminology at the Institute of Criminology in the Faculty of Law at the University of Cambridge from 1984 to 2006 and until December 2007 a professor of criminology jointly at the universities of Cambridge and Sheffield.

== Biography ==
Bottoms was educated at Eltham College and Corpus Christi College, Oxford (BA), followed by Corpus Christi College, Cambridge (Dip Criminol), and the University of Sheffield (PhD).

He worked as a probation officer before entering academic life as a researcher at Cambridge. At Cambridge, he worked at the new Institute of Criminology under the guidance of Leon Radzinowicz. Subsequently, he became a lecturer in Sheffield (1968), becoming a professor there in 1976. He was knighted in 2001 for services to the criminal justice system, an Honorary Doctor of Laws at the University of Edinburgh in 2015, and is a Fellow of the British Academy. He is life fellow at Fitzwilliam College, Cambridge.

Bottoms' influence within British and global criminology and upon criminal justice practice has been considerable. He has published and contributed towards a large number of highly influential journal articles, official reports, book chapters, and books on topics including environmental criminology, probation, the sociology of punishment, community penalties, desistance research, policing, and prisons. Among his contributions, he coined the term 'populist punitiveness' in 1995, subsequently more widely referred to as penal populism, a hypothesis that became influential within the sociology of punishment.

== Selected publications ==
- A.E. Bottoms (1977) 'Reflections on the renaissance of dangerousness', Howard Journal of Penology and Crime Prevention, Vol. 16(2), pp. 70-96.
- A.E. Bottoms (1995) 'The Philosophy and Politics of Punishment and Sentencing', in C. Clarkson and R. Morgan (eds) The Politics of Sentencing Reform, Oxford: Clarendon.
- R. Sparks, A.E. Bottoms and W. Hay (1996) Prisons and the Problem of Order, Clarendon Press
- A. von Hirsch, A.E. Bottoms, E. Burney and P-O. Wikström (1999) Criminal Deterrence and Sentence Severity, Hart Publishing
- A.E. Bottoms (2001) ‘Compliance and Community Penalties’ in A.E. Bottoms, L. Gelsthorpe and S. Rex (Eds) Community Penalties: Change and Challenges, Willan Publishing
- A.E. Bottoms (2002) ‘Morality, Crime, Compliance and Public Policy’ in A.E. Bottoms and M. Tonry (Eds) Ideology, Crime and Criminal Justice, Willan Publishing
- A.E. Bottoms (2003) ‘Theoretical Reflections on the Evaluation of a Penal Policy Initiative’ in L. Zedner and A. Ashworth (Eds) The Criminological Foundations of Penal Policy, Oxford University Press
- Bottoms, Anthony; Shapland, Joanna; Costello, Andrew; Holmes, Deborah; Muir, Grant (September 2004). "Towards Desistance: Theoretical Underpinnings for an Empirical Study". The Howard Journal of Criminal Justice. 43 (4): 368–389. doi:10.1111/j.1468-2311.2004.00336.x.
- A.E. Bottoms (2006) ‘Incivilities, Offence and Social Order in Residential Communities’, in A. von Hirsch and A. Simester (Eds) Incivilities: Regulating Offensive Behaviour, Hart Publishing
- C. Walston and A. Bottoms (eds) Challenging Crime: A Portrait of the Cambridge Institute of Criminology, Third Millennium Publishing
