= F. M. McClintock =

British criminologist

Frederick Hemming McClintock (13 March 1926 – 22 May 1994) was a British criminologist.

In 1960 he was assistant director of Research at the University of Cambridge, Institute of Criminology. There he worked on research for Crimes of Violence: An Enquiry by the Cambridge Institute of Criminology into Crimes of Violence Against the Person in London, published by Macmillan in 1963. He held the first chair as professor of criminology at the University of Edinburgh (1974-1994) where he was also Dean of the Faculty of Law from 1982 to 1985.

McClintock was a council member of the Scottish Association for Victim Support Schemes (SAVSS), and was a member of the Perks Committee on Criminal Statistics.

He is buried in the Parish of the Ascension Burial Ground in Cambridge.
