= Fitzwilliam College, Cambridge =

College of the University of Cambridge

Fitzwilliam College
- University of Cambridge
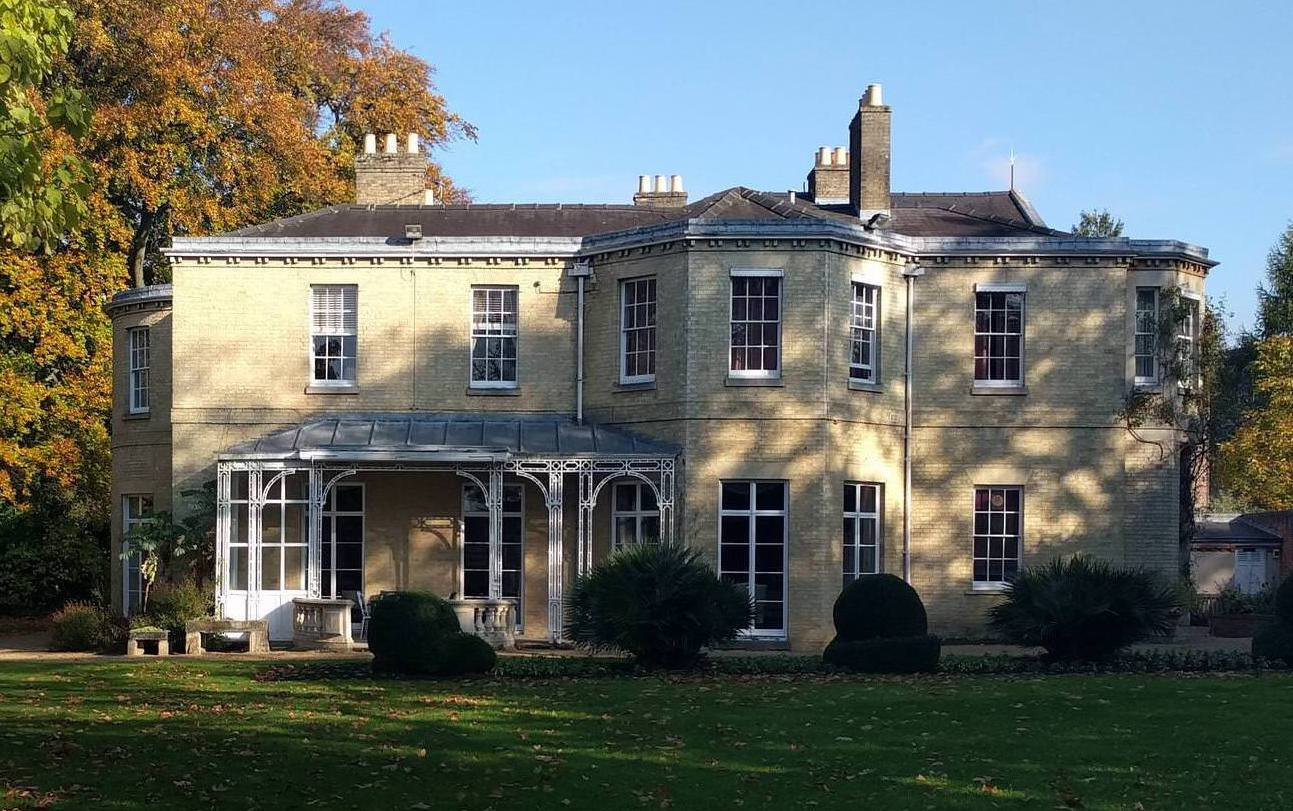
- The Grove, Fitzwilliam College

- Arms: Lozengy argent and gules; a chief of the arms of the University of Cambridge
Scarf colours: maroon, with two equally-spaced narrow grey stripes
- Location: Storey's Way, Cambridge, England (map)
- Coordinates: 52.21447°N 0.10489°E
- Full name: The Master, Fellows and Scholars of Fitzwilliam College in the University of Cambridge
- Abbreviation: F
- Motto: Ex antiquis et novissimis optima (Latin)
- Motto in English: The best of old and new
- Established: 1966 (1869 as a non-collegiate body)
- Named after: The 7th Viscount Fitzwilliam
- Former names: Fitzwilliam Hall (non-collegiate) (1869–1924); Fitzwilliam House (non-collegiate) (1924–1966)
- Sister college: St Edmund Hall, Oxford
- Master: The Baroness Morgan of Huyton
- Undergraduates: 520 (2022-23)
- Postgraduates: 396 (2022-23)
- Endowment: £102.5m (2025)
- Visitor: Chancellors of the university ex officio
- Website: fitz.cam.ac.uk
- JCR: fitzjcr.com
- MCR: mcr.fitz.cam.ac.uk
- Boat club: Fitzwilliam College Boat Club

Map
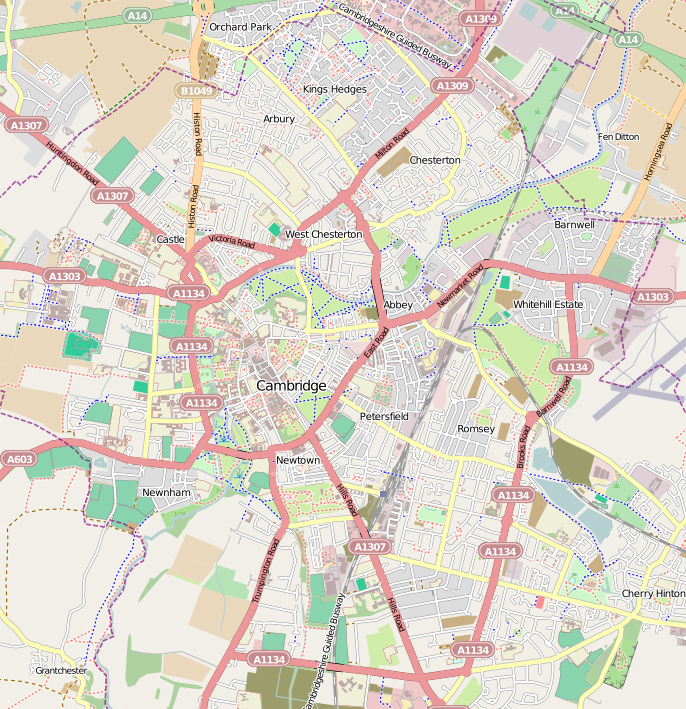
- Location within Cambridge

Fitzwilliam College is a constituent college of the University of Cambridge, England. The college has origins from 1869, with the foundation of the Non-Collegiate Students Board, a venture intended to offer academically excellent students of all backgrounds a chance to study at the university. The institution was originally based at Fitzwilliam Hall (later renamed Fitzwilliam House), opposite the Fitzwilliam Museum in south-west Cambridge. Having moved to its present site in the north of the city, Fitzwilliam attained collegiate status in 1966. Female undergraduates were first admitted in 1978, around the time most colleges were first admitting women.

Fitzwilliam is now home to around 500 undergraduates, 400 graduate students and 90 fellows. By overall student numbers, it was the seventh-largest college in Cambridge as of 2018/19. The college's boat club is Fitzwilliam College Boat Club.

Notable alumni of Fitzwilliam College include six Nobel laureates, a large number of prominent academics, public officials, businesspeople, clergy and athletes, three heads of state or government, one former UK Supreme Court Justice, and a significant number of political figures including current Prime Minister of the United Kingdom Andy Burnham, former Liberal Democrats leader Sir Vince Cable, former Chancellor of the Exchequer Norman Lamont, and two former Commissioners of the Metropolitan Police.

== History ==
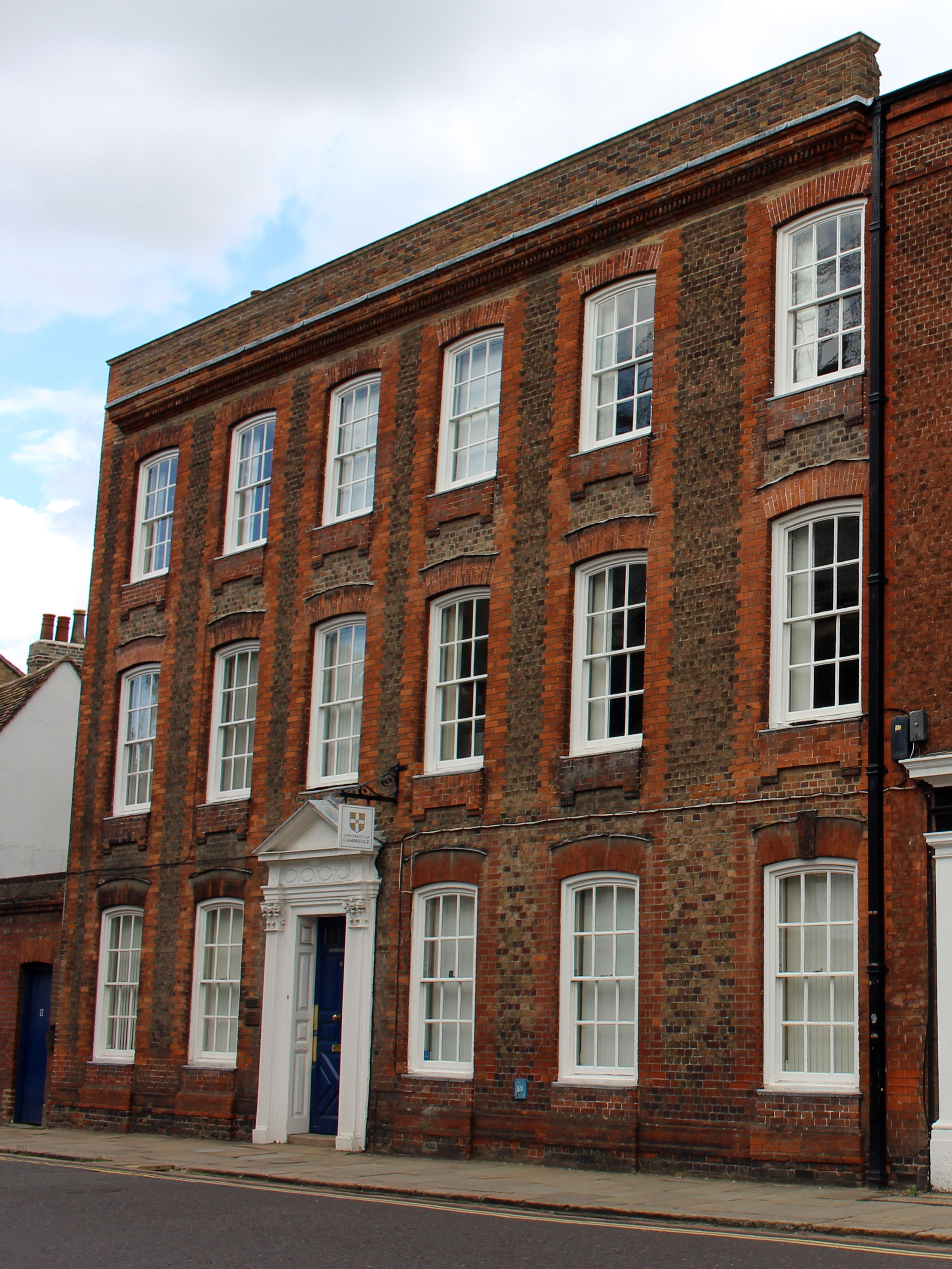
31 Trumpington Street (opposite the Fitzwilliam Museum), home of Fitzwilliam House 1874–1963

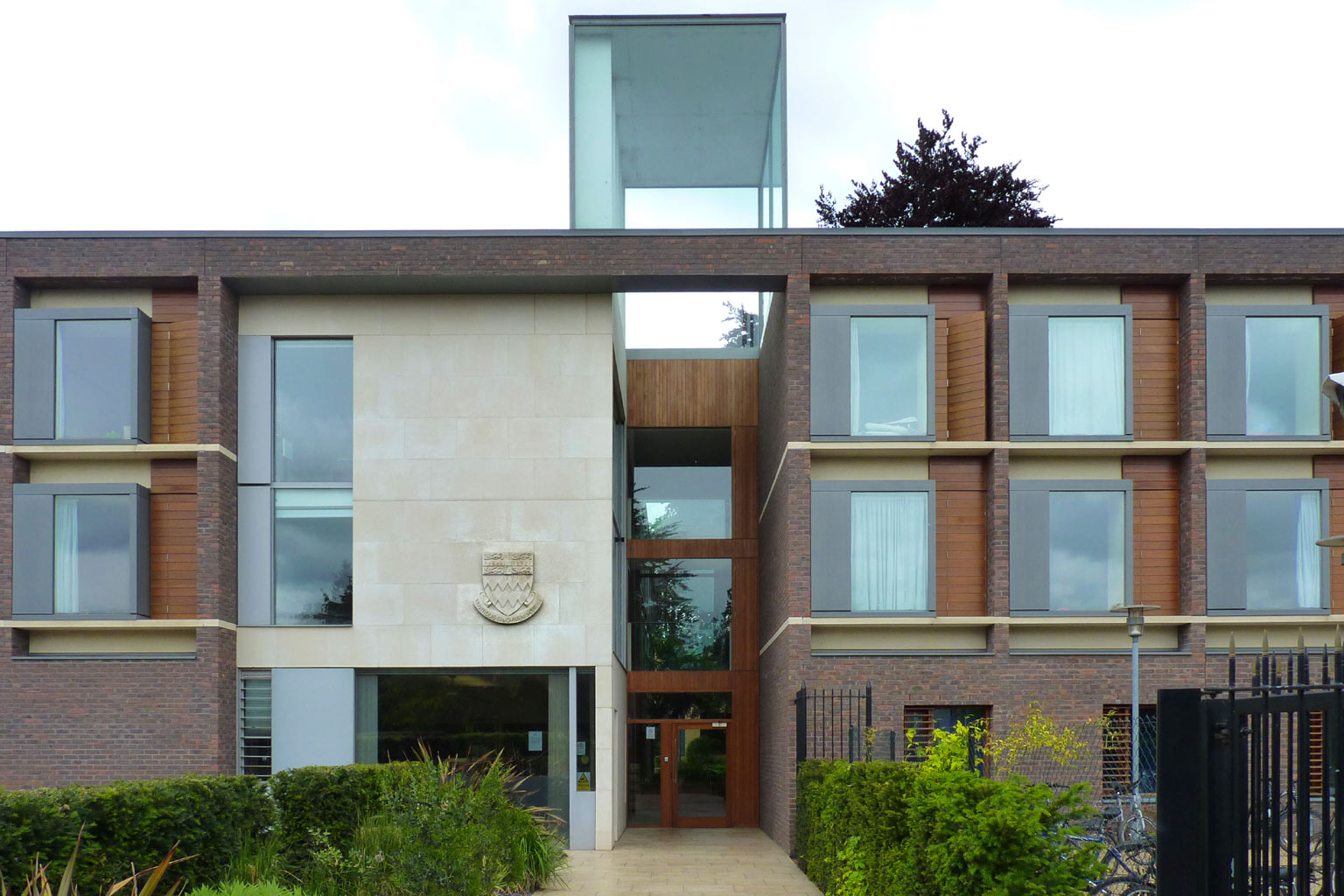
The present main entrance and porters' lodge on Storey's Way

=== Foundation ===
In 1869, Cambridge University altered its statutes to allow men who were not members of a college to become members of the university under the supervision of a censor, whose office was in Trumpington Street, opposite the Fitzwilliam Museum, founded in 1816 under the will of Richard FitzWilliam, 7th Viscount FitzWilliam (1745–1816). This provided students who could not afford to belong to a college with a base from which to study at the university, allowing them to be admitted to degrees, sit examinations and compete for scholarships. The name "Fitzwilliam" was chosen by the students at a meeting of the Non-Collegiate Amalgamation Club in 1887 and, as a result, the university decreed that the house in Trumpington Street could be known as Fitzwilliam Hall. The coat of arms of the new establishment appropriated the arms of the Fitzwilliam family (lozengy argent and gules), to which it had no connection, and added as a chief the arms of Cambridge University. Fitzwilliam Hall became the headquarters of the Non-Collegiate Students Board and provided student facilities and limited accommodation. It was renamed Fitzwilliam House in 1922.

Because of its emphasis on academic ability rather than wealth, Fitzwilliam quickly attracted a strong academic contingent that included future Nobel Prize winners, heads of state and important judicial figures. It developed a tradition in Medicine and established a reputation as one of the most internationally diverse institutions within the university.

In the second half of the 20th century, the availability of grants made Cambridge more accessible and the need for a non-collegiate body of undergraduates began to decline. The possibility that Fitzwilliam could close prompted an outcry from former students and it was therefore decided that it should aim for collegiate status. Funds were accumulated and a new site was acquired at Castle Hill, about one mile north of the city centre. The first new buildings were opened in 1963.

In 1966, Fitzwilliam House was granted a royal charter by the Queen-in-Council and became Fitzwilliam College.

=== Expansion ===
Since Fitzwilliam began operating at its current site in the north-west of Cambridge, it has grown steadily and developed into one of the university's larger, more cosmopolitan colleges. Built around a regency manor house, the college has grown by one or two buildings each decade and now consists of five interconnected courts, enclosing large, rectangular gardens. In contrast to most of the university, and indeed the regency estate at the college's centre, the majority of the buildings are of modern design.

The first two courts and the central building (comprising, among other things, the rooms formerly belonging to the old library, the dining hall, the junior common room and the bar) were designed by Sir Denys Lasdun and completed in 1963. The intention was for these buildings to constitute the back of the college and, as funding became available, the college grew to the south, with New Court (1985), the Chapel (1991) and Wilson Court (1994). Finally, the plan was completed when Gatehouse Court (2003) became the college's new front. In the following year, the college completed the new Auditorium building, and in doing so became home to some of the best performance facilities in the university.

In 2007 the college built a new boathouse on the River Cam, in 2009 the Library and IT Centre was added and, in 2010, the college acquired the buildings and grounds that formerly belonged to the Cambridge Lodge Hotel with the intention of renovating them for the use of graduate students.

Fitzwilliam has, over the years, also become known for its beautiful gardens, which largely predate the college. In 2008, an archaeological dig discovered on the college site the earliest clear evidence of settlement in Cambridge, the remains of a 3,500-year-old farmstead.

Fitzwilliam was the third Cambridge college and is, as of today, one of only nine to have won University Challenge. It did so in 1973 with a team that consisted of Philip Bassett (Botany), David Curry (Material Sciences), David Wurtzel (Law) and Michael Halls (English). The same team featured in the 2002 Reunited Series and won its only game, which was against a team from neighbouring college Churchill, winner of the 1970 series.

As of 2025, Fitzwilliam had fixed assets worth just under £170m and an endowment of just over £100m.

== Buildings and grounds ==
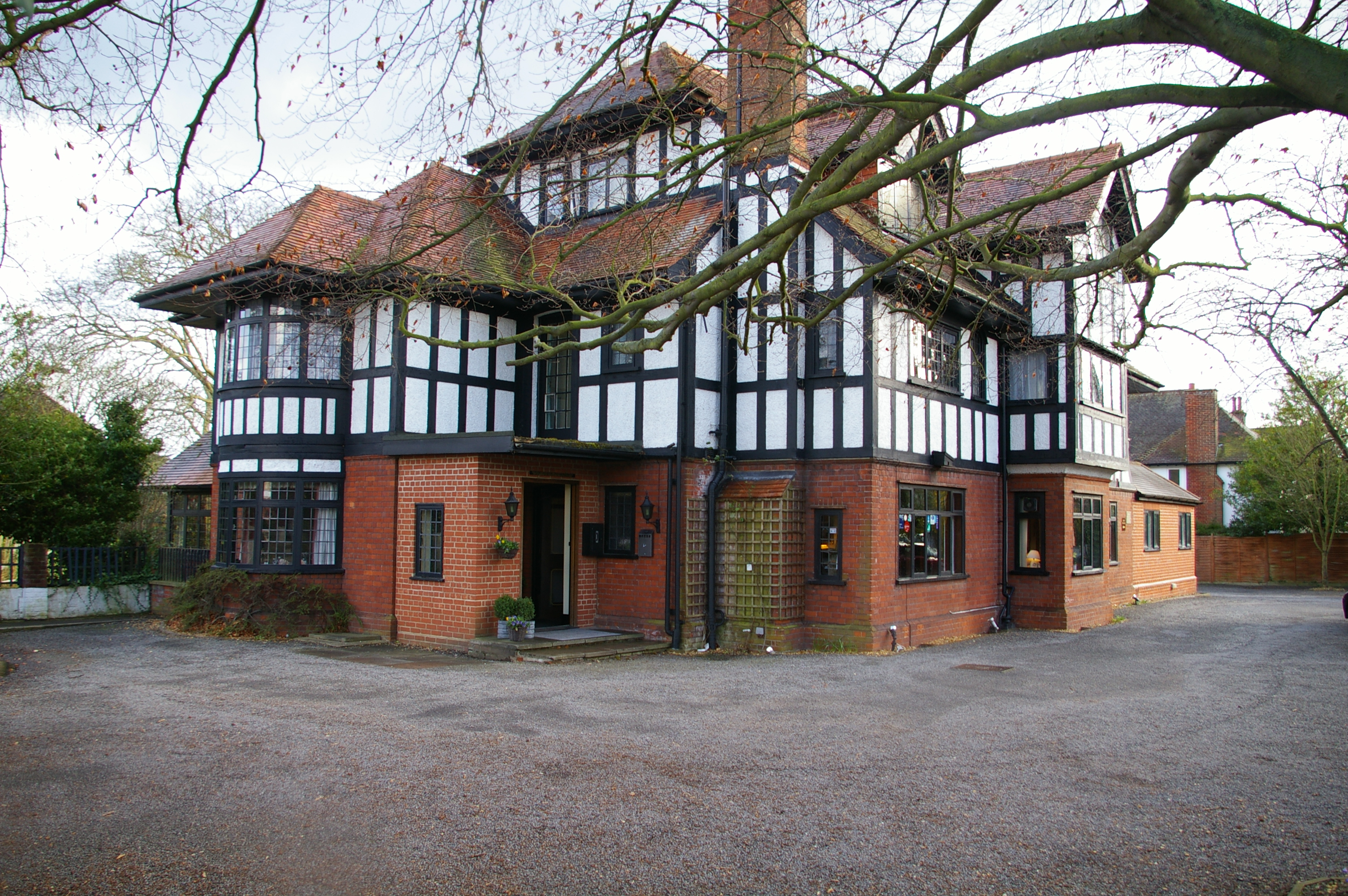
One of the college hostels, located off Storey's Way

The main grounds of the college are located off Storey's Way, towards the north-west of Cambridge. The college is sometimes identified as one of the Hill Colleges, together with Churchill College, St Edmund's College, Girton College and Murray Edwards College. These colleges are all among the most recently established and tend to share certain architectural features.

Fitzwilliam consists of a variety of modern buildings, built in the grounds of a regency estate. The Central Hall Building, New Court and Chapel became Grade II listed buildings in 2024.

=== The Grove (1813) ===
The college's centrepiece is the Grove, a Grade II regency manor house, designed by the architect William Custance and constructed in 1813. Custance was also the house's first resident and his initials, along with the date '1814', can be found on a rainwater hopper at the side of the house.

Another slightly smaller building known as Grove Lodge was also designed by Custance and is now part of Murray Edwards College. For some time, both properties were owned by the Darwin family and the Grove served as Emma Darwin's primary residence between 1883 and 1896, following the death of her husband Charles. During this time, she had the interior lined with original William Morris wallpaper and two of her sons had smaller houses built in the grounds. Although both have since been demolished, the house built by Horace Darwin, which was known as the Orchard, was donated to Murray Edwards College in 1962 and the site now serves as its primary campus. In 1988, the Grove became part of Fitzwilliam and today it is home to the Senior Tutor's office and various multi-purpose rooms, as well as the Middle and Senior Common Rooms.

=== The Hall Building (1963) ===
The Hall Building is a large complex towards the back of the college. It was built between 1960 and 1963 and was designed by Sir Denys Lasdun, who won Royal Gold Medal in 1977 and is best known for having designed the National Theatre in London. The building consists primarily of the college dining hall, but also houses the bar, kitchens, the junior common room, a couple of seminar rooms and a music room. The dinner gong, just outside the dining hall, was originally the bell of the aircraft carrier HMS Ocean, and was presented to Fitzwilliam House by Admiral of the Fleet Sir Caspar John in 1962.

=== Fellows' Court (1963) ===
Like the Hall Building, Fellows' Court was part of the initial construction, designed by Sir Denys Lasdun and completed in 1963 at a cost of approximately £300,000. It occupies an area in the far corner of the college and is enclosed by the Hall Building, the Law Library and two dormitories. It is generally reserved for fellows, and, as well as residence, housed the Fellows' Parlour.

=== Tree Court (1963) ===
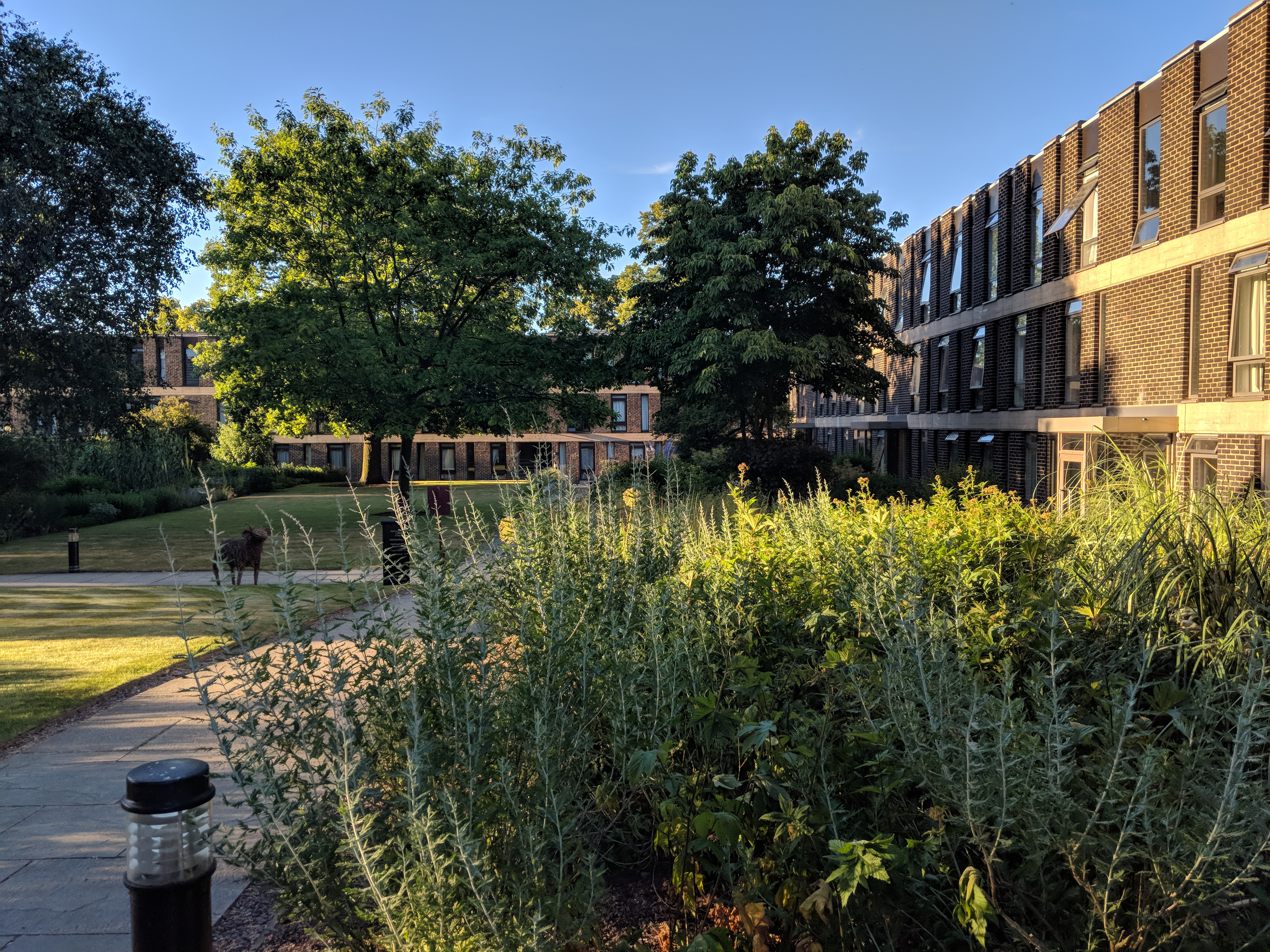
Tree Court

Tree Court, the last component of the initial 1963 construction, is located at the north end of the college, opposite Fellows' Court. The court was initially the college's main entrance and, with a car park and a cycling bay just outside, it remains a back door to the college. Tree Court was Lasdun's first student accommodation; he would go on to design similar buildings at the University of East Anglia and Christ's College, Cambridge. Although the court opens out onto the college gardens, the wall opposite the Hall Building was recently lengthened with the addition of the college's new Library and IT Centre. Today, Tree Court provides residence for the majority of first-year students.

=== New Court (1985) ===
In the mid-eighties, the college expanded to the south with the construction of New Court, a three-walled residential compound, designed by MacCormac Jamieson Prichard. Students and fellows contributed to the design with such ideas as intersecting staircases and elongated windows. The building won 1989 David Urwin Award for Best New Building.

In 2004, the court gained its fourth wall with the completion of the college's new auditorium.

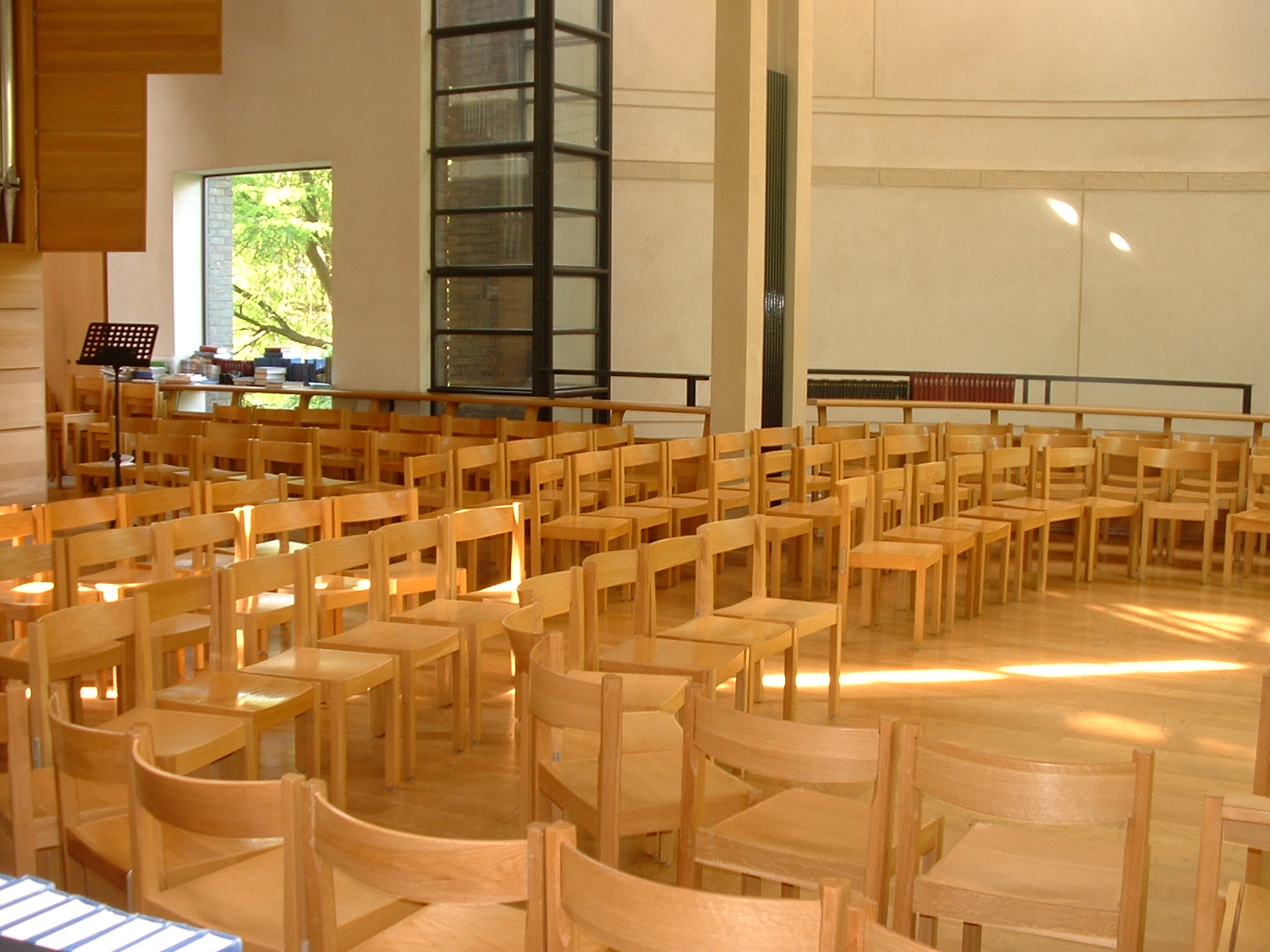
Inside the College Chapel

=== The Chapel (1991) ===
In 1991, a college chapel was appended to the north wing of New Court. The building, which was also designed by MacCormac Jamieson Prichard, faces directly towards the Grove and is in the International style. It is designed to resemble the hull of a ship, hinting at the religious themes of journey and protection. The building is home to a fine two-manual organ designed by Peter Collins, a Bechstein grand piano and a Goble harpsichord. The addition won the 1992 Civic Trust Award, the 1993 Carpenters' Award and the 1993 David Urwin Award for Best New Building. The firm later used a similar design for the Ruskin Library at the University of Lancaster.

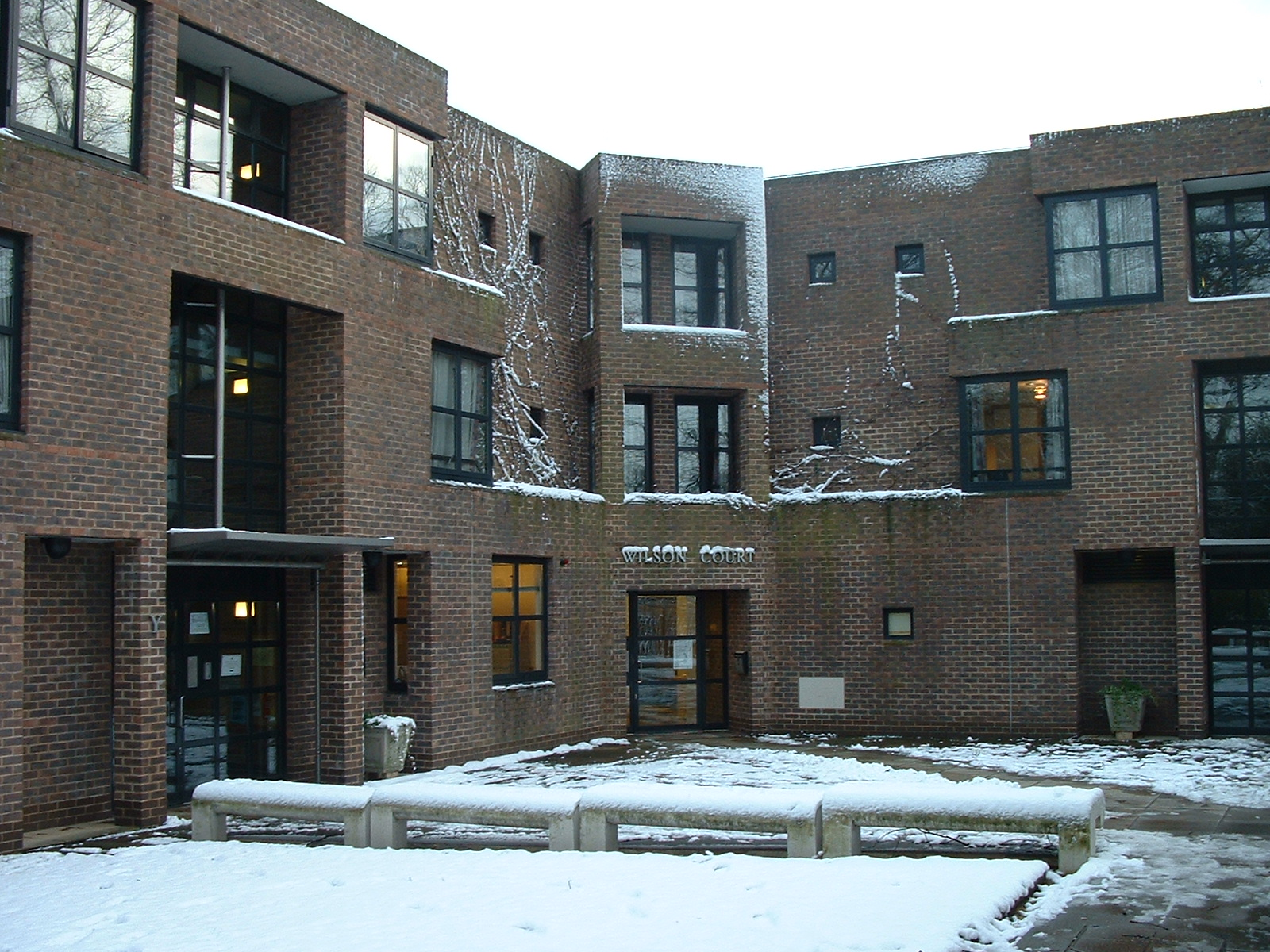
Wilson Court

=== Wilson Court (1994) ===
The fourth court was added to the south of the college, next to the boundary with Murray Edwards, in 1994. It was designed by van Heyningen and Haward Architects and includes 48 acoustically independent student bedrooms, three seminar rooms, a large common room with a bar and the Gordon Cameron Lecture Theatre, which is also used as the college cinema. It won the 1996 RIBA Award.

=== Gatehouse Court (2003) ===
The completion of Gatehouse Court in 2003 saw the realisation of Sir Denys Lasdun's original vision. The design, courtesy of Allies & Morrison, reorientated the college by giving it a new entrance, complete with Porter's Lodge, administrative offices, meeting rooms, parking facilities, a large-scale engraving of the college crest and a flagpole. It also provided an extra 42 en suite bedrooms for student accommodation. The college now faces south and opens onto Storey's Way, a smaller, primarily residential, street branching off Madingley Road; in 2021 it was reported to be the most expensive street in East Anglia.

This development expanded the college's main site dramatically and the quality of the design was recognised with the award of the 2005 RIBA Award and the 2005 BDA Award for Building of the Year.

=== Auditorium (2004) ===
The Auditorium building was completed in 2004. Having overseen the construction of Gatehouse Court, Allies & Morrison were employed to design the college's new performance facilities. Built using a similar brick to that used for the Grove almost 200 years earlier, the building is largely below ground-level, resulting in a direct view of the surrounding landscape for audience members towards the back of the gallery. It won the 2005 Concrete Society Award and the 2005 BDA Award for Best Public Building.

Located near the front of the college, the building faces New Court and backs onto the college gardens. Consisting of a large central performance area, three smaller practice rooms and an entrance hall, the auditorium is the official home of the Fitzwilliam Quartet.

The main hall houses a Steinway grand piano, and a tympani, a full-size drum kit, amplifiers and a Bösendorfer piano for student use. Although used primarily for music, the building has also hosted drama performances and important lectures. In recent years, guest speakers have included the American politician Jesse Jackson, former poet laureate Sir Andrew Motion, and the former head of MI6 Sir Richard Dearlove, who visited the college as part of the Arrol Adam Lecture Series in 2008.

=== The Olisa Library (2009) ===
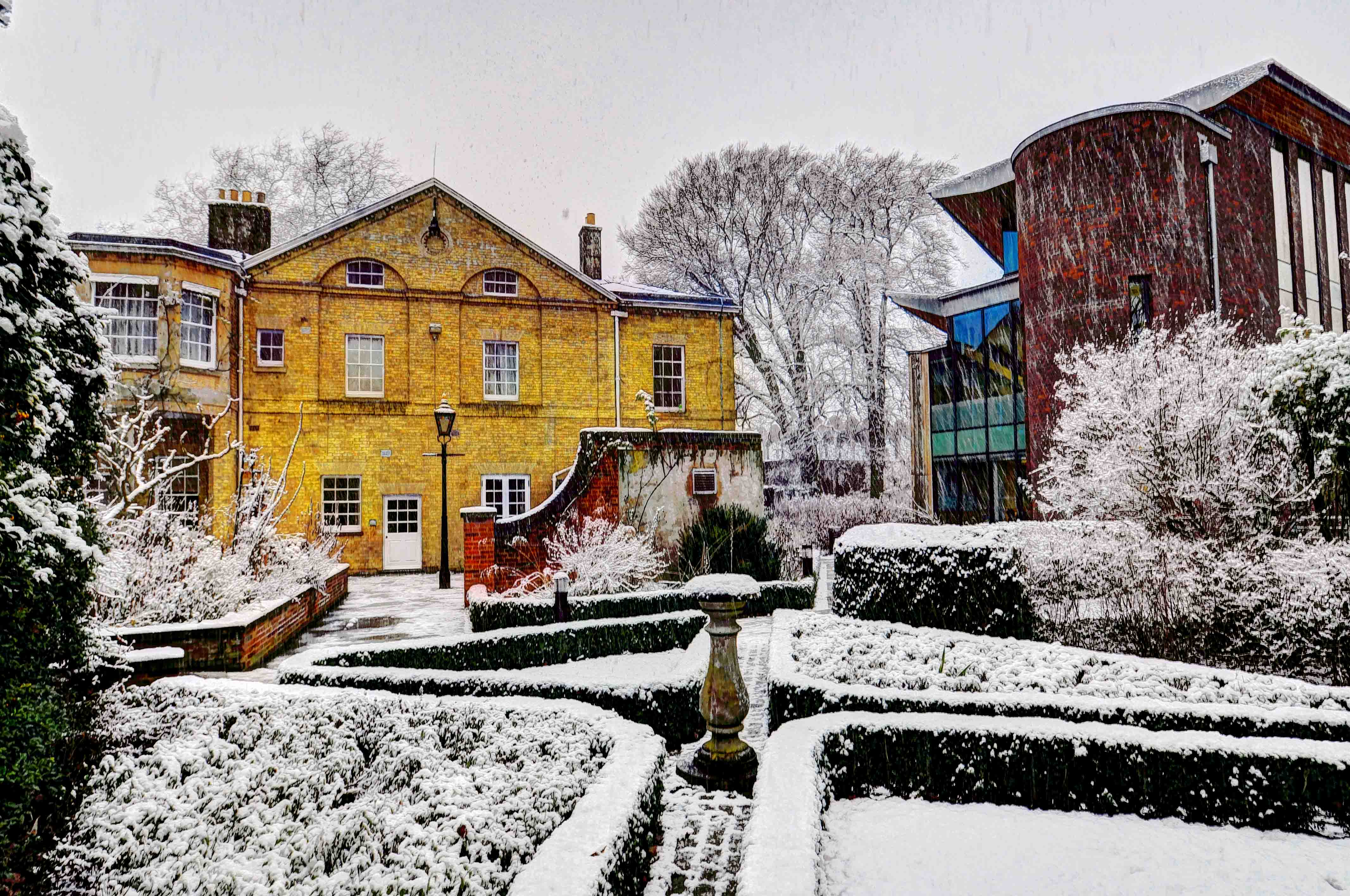
Part of the Olisa Library and the south façade of the Grove

A new library and IT centre was completed in 2009. As of January 2010, its book collection contains around 60,000 volumes and increases by about 1,000 volumes each year. The building was designed by Edward Cullinan, who had worked with Lasdun on the original college plan, and was undertaking his first major project after receiving the Royal Gold Medal in 2008. It was built as an extension to the uncompleted east wing of Tree Court.

The building was opened in April 2010 by the Duke of Edinburgh and is fitted with extensive computing facilities. In 2011, alumnus Ken Olisa donated £1.4m to the development of the Library and IT Centre. In tribute the building was named the Olisa Library.

Because Fitzwilliam is at the top of one of the few hills in Cambridge, the Olisa Library's tower is one of the highest points in the city, sometimes said to be the highest.

== Heritage ==
=== Name ===
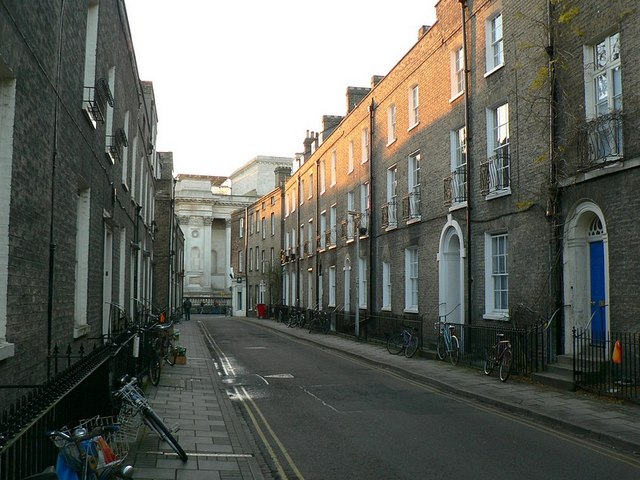
Fitzwilliam Street, where many of the non-collegiate (i.e. Fitzwilliam) students originally resided

The name of the college refers ultimately to the Fitzwilliam family, prominent members of the Anglo-Irish nobility, whose ancestral seat Milton Hall is located to the north of Cambridge and who, as students and benefactors, have been associated with the university for several hundred years; more directly, it refers to the Fitzwilliam Museum, founded in 1816 with the bequest of the library, art collection and personal fortune of the 7th Viscount Fitzwilliam and situated directly opposite the original headquarters of the Non-Collegiate Students Board, and also to the adjacent Fitzwilliam Street, where many of the non-collegiate students were housed.

=== Coat of arms ===
Along with the name, the college's coat of arms first came into use in the 1880s when Fitzwilliam Hall needed an emblem to represent its newly formed boat club. The result was a combination between the university coat of arms and the lozengy shield used by the Earls of Fitzwilliam. Initially, the design was used unofficially and it was only when Fitzwilliam was in the process of attaining collegiate status, some 80 years later, that it actually applied for a grant of arms. The design was formally recorded by the Duke of Norfolk on behalf of the Queen-in-Council in the late 60s. Notably, the Fitzwilliam coat of arms is the only college emblem to reference the university's own coat of arms.

==== Motto ====
The college motto is: Ex antiquis et novissimis optima (the best of the old and the new). The motto has since been adopted by the nearby village of Hardwick and is very similar to that of St Catherine's College, Oxford, which was established with aims very similar to those with which Fitzwilliam was.

=== Colours ===
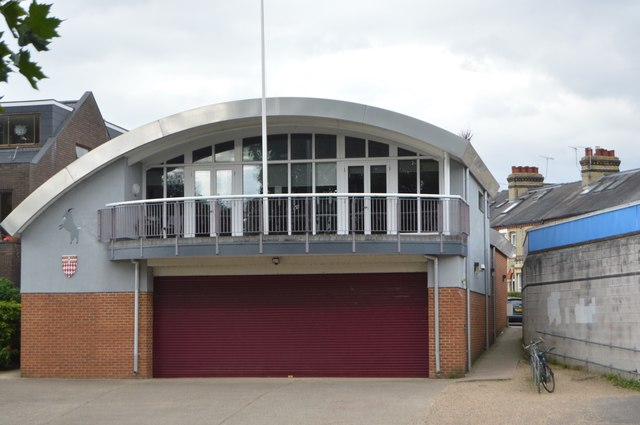
Fitzwilliam College Boat Club boathouse on the River Cam, with the Fitzbilly mascot in the foreground

The earliest records of the college's sporting clubs describe the colours as 'grey and ruby'. By Easter 1892, the colours were more closely defined as 'cardinal and French grey'. Since then various shades have been used, although the Middle Combination Room's ties, which celebrate the 1869 foundation, have reverted to cardinal as their main colour. Today, the college is firmly associated with the colours grey and dark red, although they were at one time 'blue and buff', with blue remaining the principal colour of some sporting blazers right up until the 1960s.

=== Mascot ===
Students from Fitzwilliam are sometimes informally referred to as Fitzbillys or Billygoats. As a consequence, the goat has become a popular college mascot and the image of a goat can be found on the front of the boat house, on the boat club flag, and in various places around the college.

== Academic reputation ==
Between 1997 and 2006, Fitzwilliam achieved an average of 17th place, near the bottom of the second third, in the Tompkins Table which lists the university's 29 undergraduate colleges in order of their students' examination performances. In the last decade, between 2007 and 2016, Fitzwilliam averaged 21st place, near the top of the bottom third.

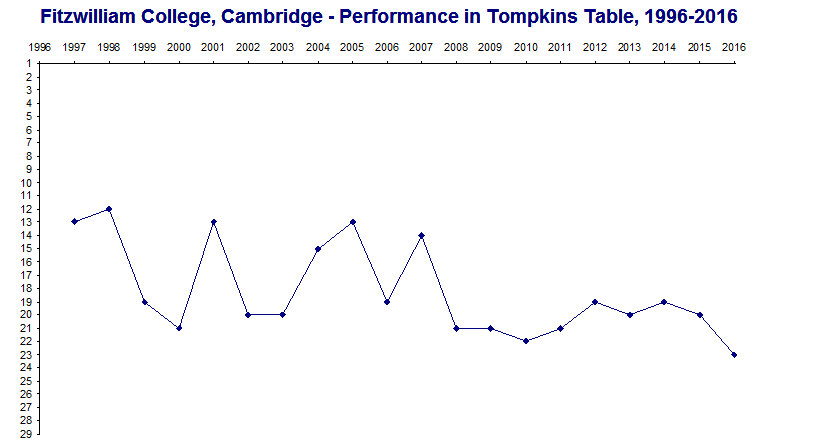
Fitzwilliam College, Cambridge – performance in Tompkins Tables, 1996–2016

The college places an increasing emphasis on Natural Sciences, with students of the discipline accounting for approximately 20% of its undergraduate intake, and has developed traditional strengths in both Music and Politics; in 2010, there were more Fitzwilliam graduates in Parliament than graduates of any other college (six MPs and four life peers). Additionally, Geography students have represented a disproportionately-high presence across generations of Fitzwilliam's undergraduate cohort, with the college hosting a unique annual taster day in reflection of this disciplinary strength.

Fitzwilliam is also home to a noted Criminology department, headed by Emeritus Professor Sir Anthony Bottoms and the former College Master Professor Nicola Padfield, and is one of the two colleges (the other being Wolfson) that takes in postgraduate students, in association with the Institute of Criminology, as part of the Police Executive Programme. As a consequence, many prominent figures in Britain's police force are associated with Fitzwilliam.

== Student life ==
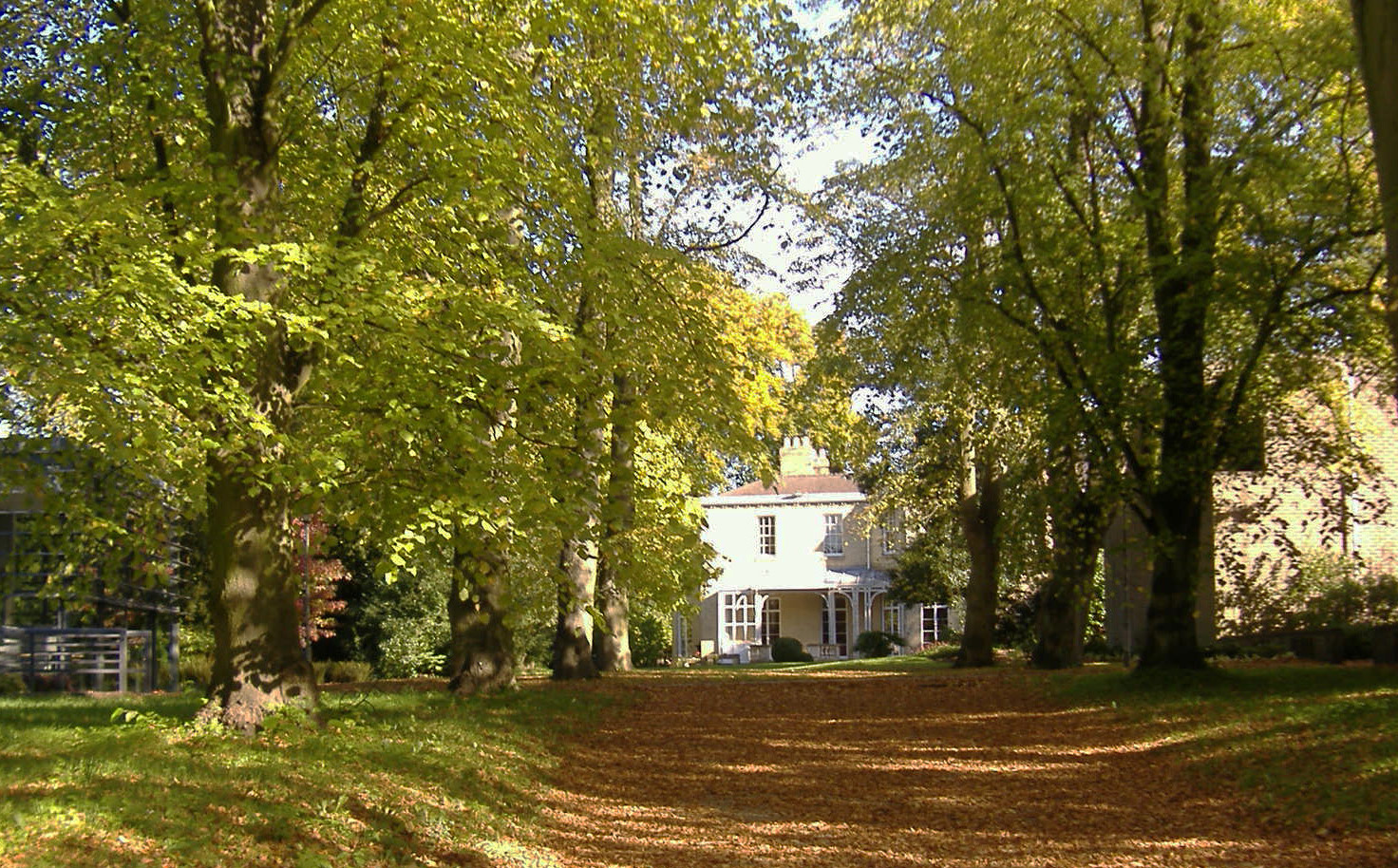
Lime tree avenue leading to the Grove

Former pupils of state schools usually comprise around 70–75% of the college's undergraduate population. This includes many overseas students as well as students from grammar schools and comprehensive schools.

=== Sport ===
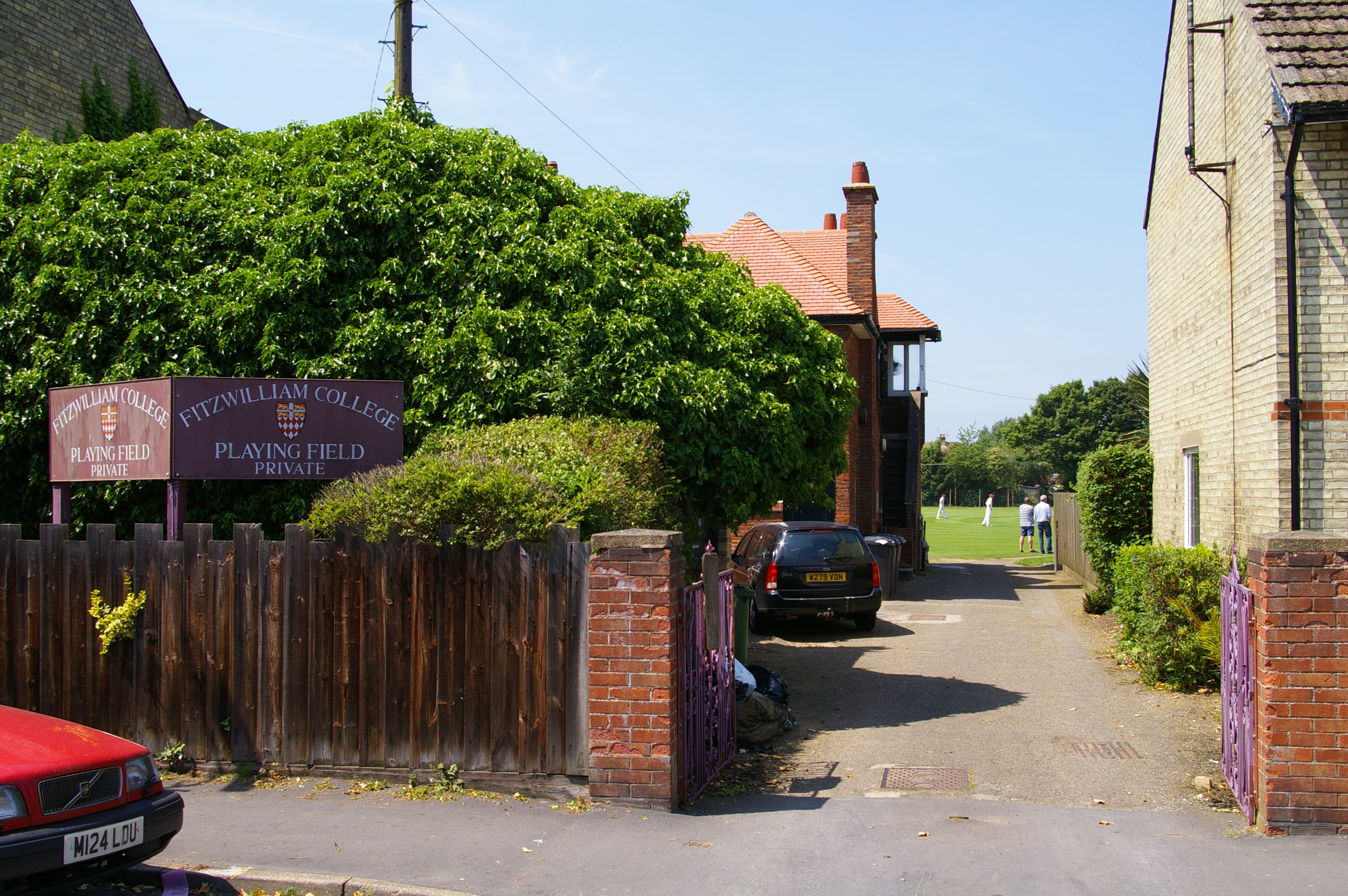
The entrance to Fitzwilliam's sports grounds on Oxford Road

Fitzwilliam is traditionally strong in football, rugby union and table tennis. In 2017, Fitzwilliam became the first college in CUAFL history to win all four major university men's football titles in one season, with Fitzwilliam's women's side winning their league simultaneously. As of 2021, Fitzwilliam were the reigning Men's Football Cuppers Champions, having won the last five years in a row.

On site, the college has a two-storey gym in the Hall Building, a badminton court in the Auditorium Building and three squash courts, which are also used for table tennis, in a separate sports hall towards the front of the college.

The college's main sports grounds are located on Oxford Road. The land was donated to Fitzwilliam Hall in honour of the students who died in the First World War. The grounds include tennis courts, a netball court, a cricket pitch, a rugby pitch, and both full-size and five-a-side football pitches. It is the only sports ground in the university with an on-site club house, complete with a bar. It is regularly used by varsity teams and is also made available to students of Murray Edwards College.

In 2007, the college completed a new boat house, home to Fitzwilliam College Boat Club.

=== Music ===
Fitzwilliam has a strong musical tradition with former students including composer and Master of the King's Music Sir Walford Davies, award-winning conductor David Atherton, the TV and radio presenter Humphrey Burton, music broadcasting executive Sonita Alleyne and singer-songwriter Nick Drake, who secured a record deal with a four-track demo recorded in his college room in 1968. Other prominent music graduates include violist Martin Outram, baritone John Noble, bassist Simon H. Fell and two founding members of the Fitzwilliam String Quartet, which often returns to the college to perform and hold workshops. Opera singer Sally Bradshaw is also on the college teaching staff.

In 2010 Fitzwilliam had more active music groups than any other college. As well as the traditional Chapel Choir, which also takes in choristers from nearby Murray Edwards, the college is home to numerous singing ensembles. The college's two a cappella groups, Fitz Barbershop and The Sirens, are respectively the oldest and the oldest all-female a cappella groups currently running in Cambridge; both are regular and often successful competitors at the annual Voice Festival UK. Other student groups include Fitz Swing, a big band established in 1990 and the longest-running student jazz band in Cambridge and Fitzwilliam Chamber Opera, 'the only permanent collegiate opera group in Cambridge'.

To encourage musical activity, the college hosts the annual Alkan Piano Competition, named after the nineteenth-century virtuoso Charles Valentin Alkan and sponsored by the Alkan Society. The competition is followed by a recital from a professional pianist with a particular interest in Alkan's music, the first of whom was Ronald Smith. Fitzwilliam also offers many music scholarships and bursaries, including, somewhat unusually, a saxophone scholarship.

Fitzwilliam new Auditorium performance venue hosts the Fitzwilliam Chamber Series, a collection of concerts by professional musicians. Performers at the college have included the cellist Julian Lloyd Webber, the DJ Annie Mac and the English Touring Opera.

==== The Fitzwilliam Quartet ====
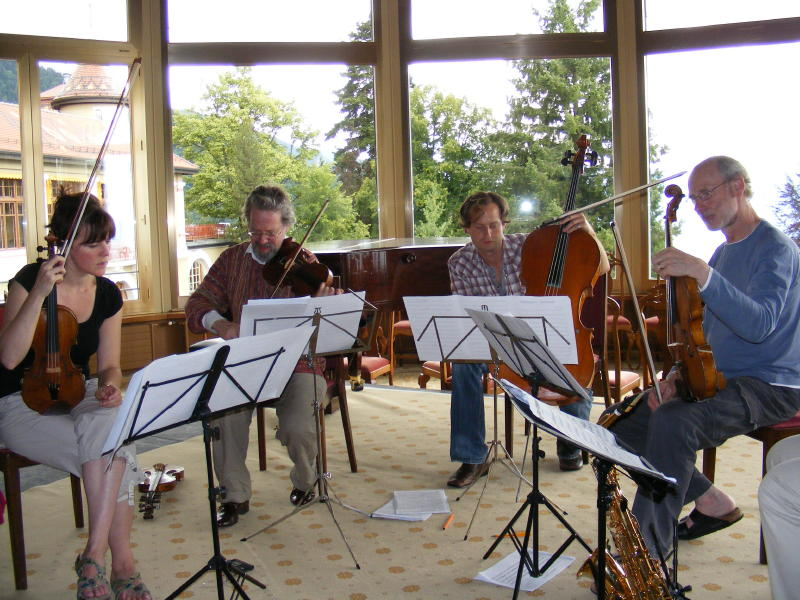
Fitzwilliam Quartet in 2008

Fitzwilliam is the only college in Cambridge with a resident professional string quartet. The Fitzwilliam Quartet was established by Cambridge undergraduates, two of them Fitzwilliam students, in 1968. They made their first professional appearance a year later at the Sheffield Arts Festival and, following graduation in 1971, became the Resident Quartet at the University of York.

Just a year into their residence, they became personally acquainted with the Russian composer Dmitri Shostakovich and gained international recognition when they were asked to premier several of his string quartets. They went on to become the first group to perform and record all 15 of his string quartets and Shostakovich himself described them as his "preferred performers".

The group proceeded to record acclaimed interpretations of many other composers, notably Brahms and Haydn, and won the Grammy Award for Chamber Music in 1977. In 1981, they were awarded Honorary Doctorates of Music by Bucknell University, which were presented by Shostakovich's son, Maxim.

In 2005, a number of their recordings were included in Gramophone magazine's list of the "Hundred Greatest-ever Recordings". They have a long-term contract with Decca Records and perform regularly all over the world. Although membership has changed over the years, the group returned to Fitzwilliam in 1999 when they were appointed the college's Resident Quartet. They visit for performances and workshops each term and even premier pieces written by students. In 2008, they celebrated their 40th anniversary.

==== The University Orchestra ====
The University of Cambridge Philharmonic Orchestra (UCPO) was founded as an offshoot of Fitzwilliam College Music Society. In its early days, the orchestra was supported by grants from the college and rehearsing took place on site. It was initially called the West Cambridge Symphony Orchestra, because the majority of its members were from West Cambridge colleges – predominantly Fitzwilliam, Churchill and New Hall. Although the orchestra later changed its name, a smaller affiliated group, known as the West Cambridge Sinfonia, maintains the reference.

In 2010 the orchestra was rehearsing primarily at St Giles' Church. It toured and recorded on a regular basis and performs University concerts once a term. At Fitzwilliam, the role originally played by WCSO has since been taken over by the Orchestra on the Hill.

== Notable alumni ==
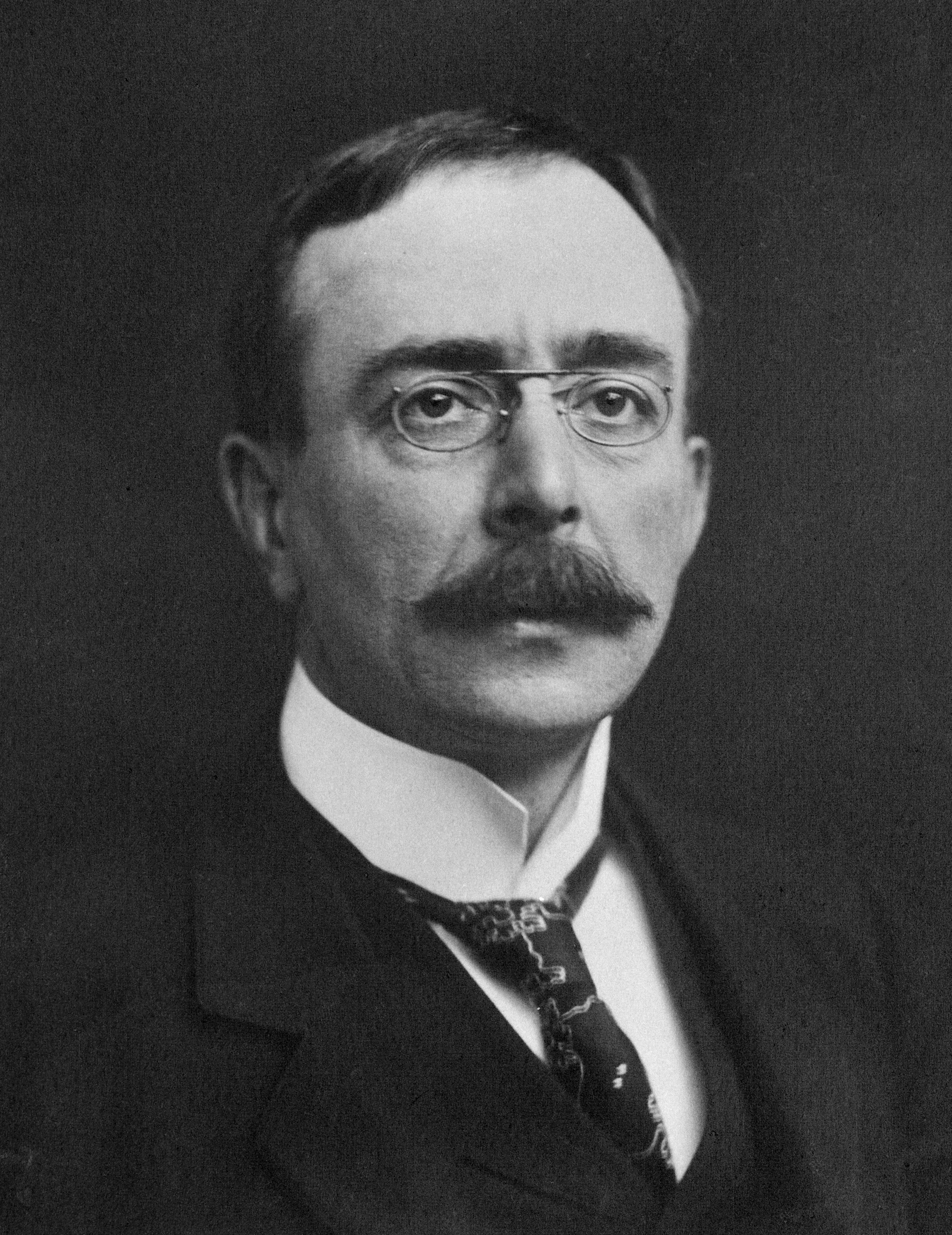
Sir Charles Scott Sherrington, neuroscientist, winner of the Nobel Prize in Medicine (1932)

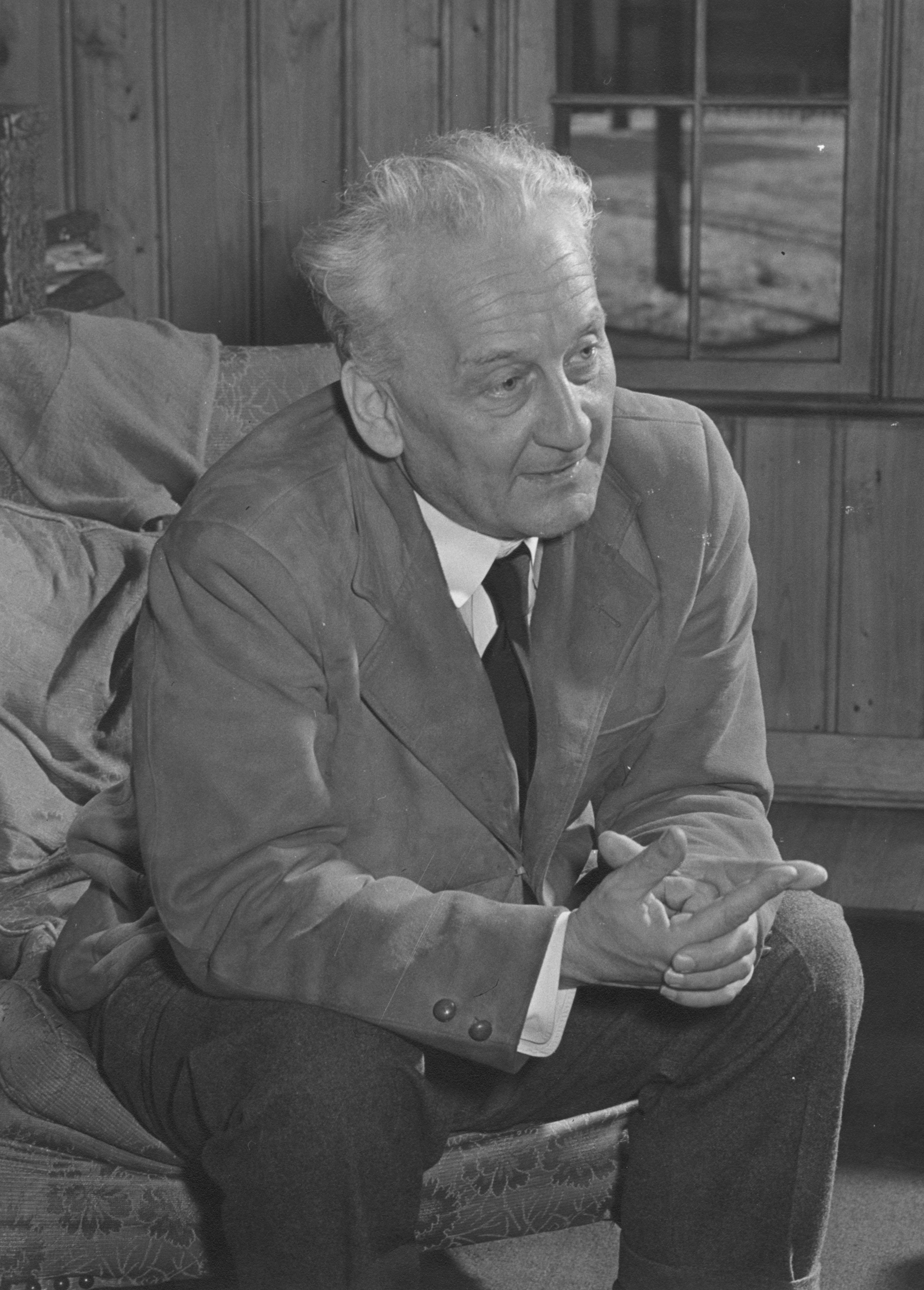
Albert Szent-Györgyi, Hungarian physiologist famous for discovering vitamin C, winner of the Nobel Prize in Medicine (1937)

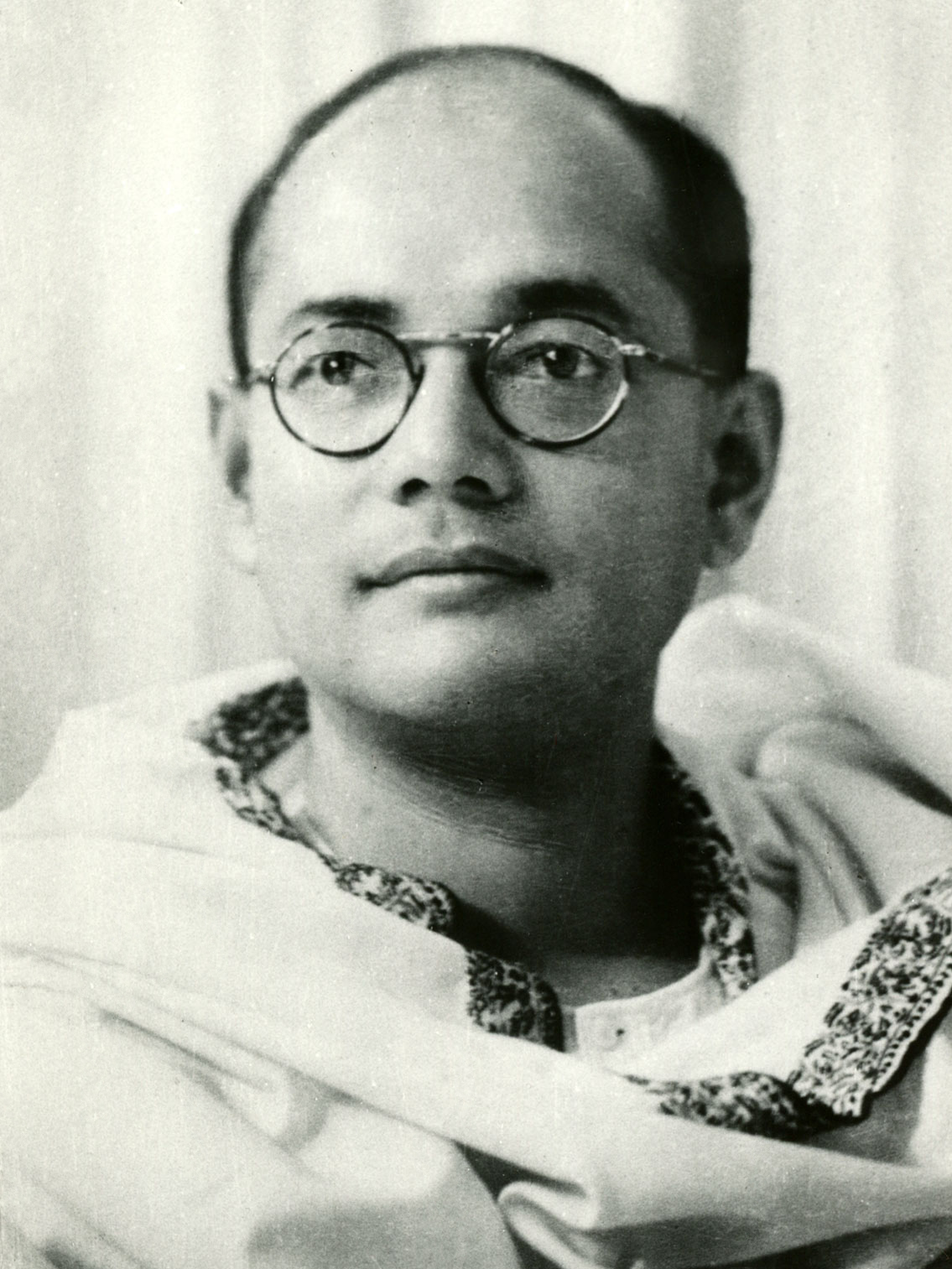
Subhas Chandra Bose, Indian revolutionary leader

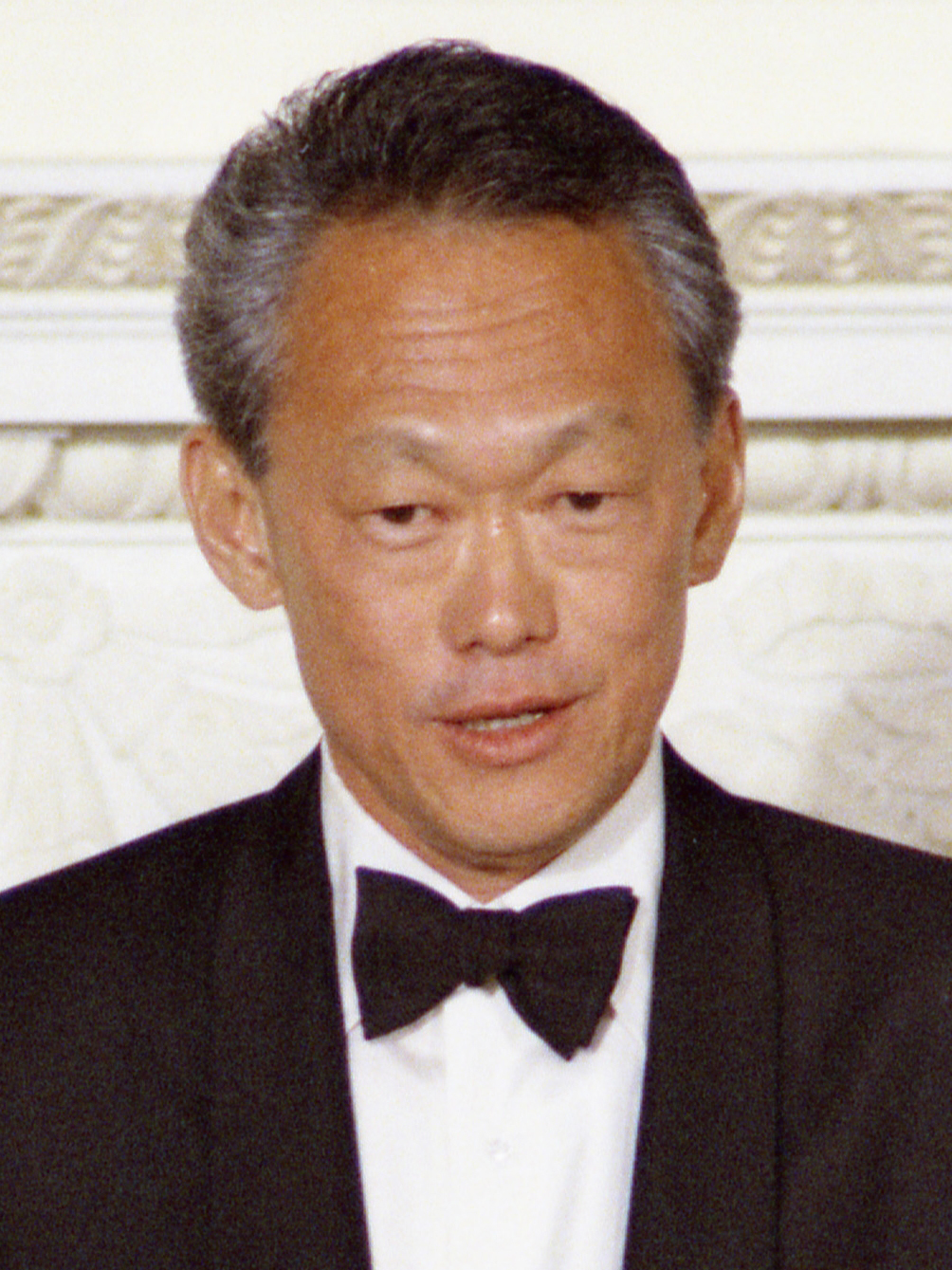
Lee Kuan Yew, the first prime minister of Singapore (1959–90)

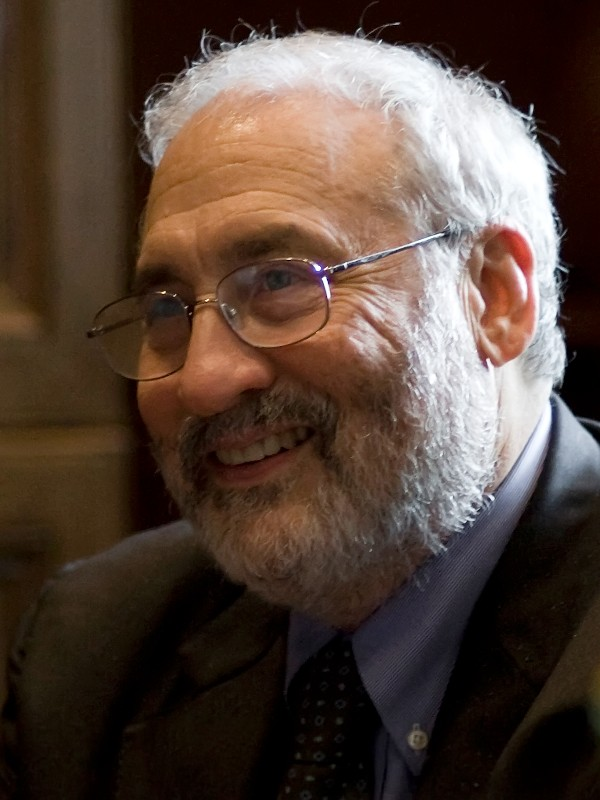
Joseph Stiglitz, the World Bank Chief Economist (1997–2000) and the winner of the Nobel Prize for Economics (2001)

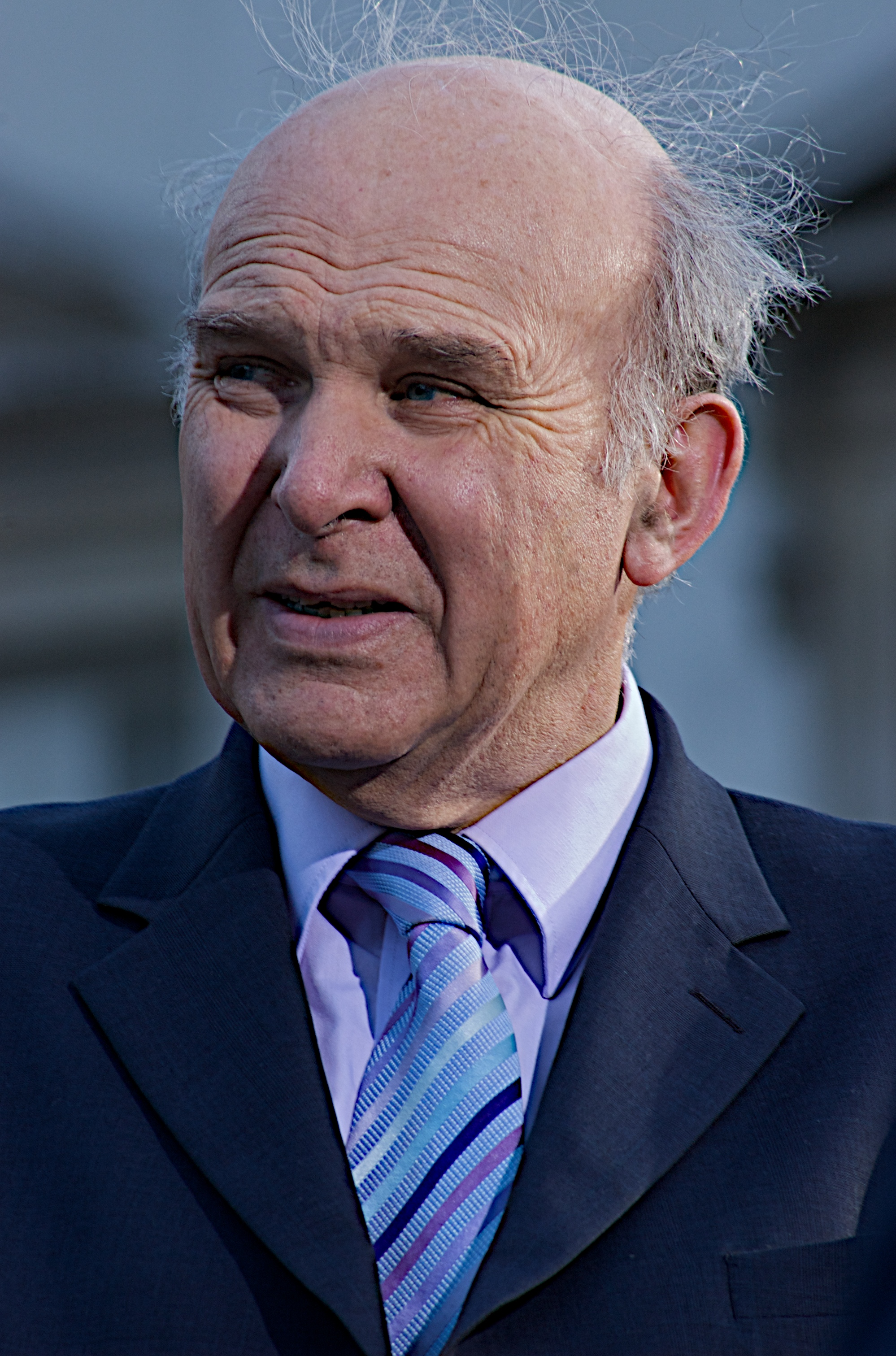
Vince Cable, politician, Leader of the Liberal Democrats (2017–19) and Business Secretary (2010–15)

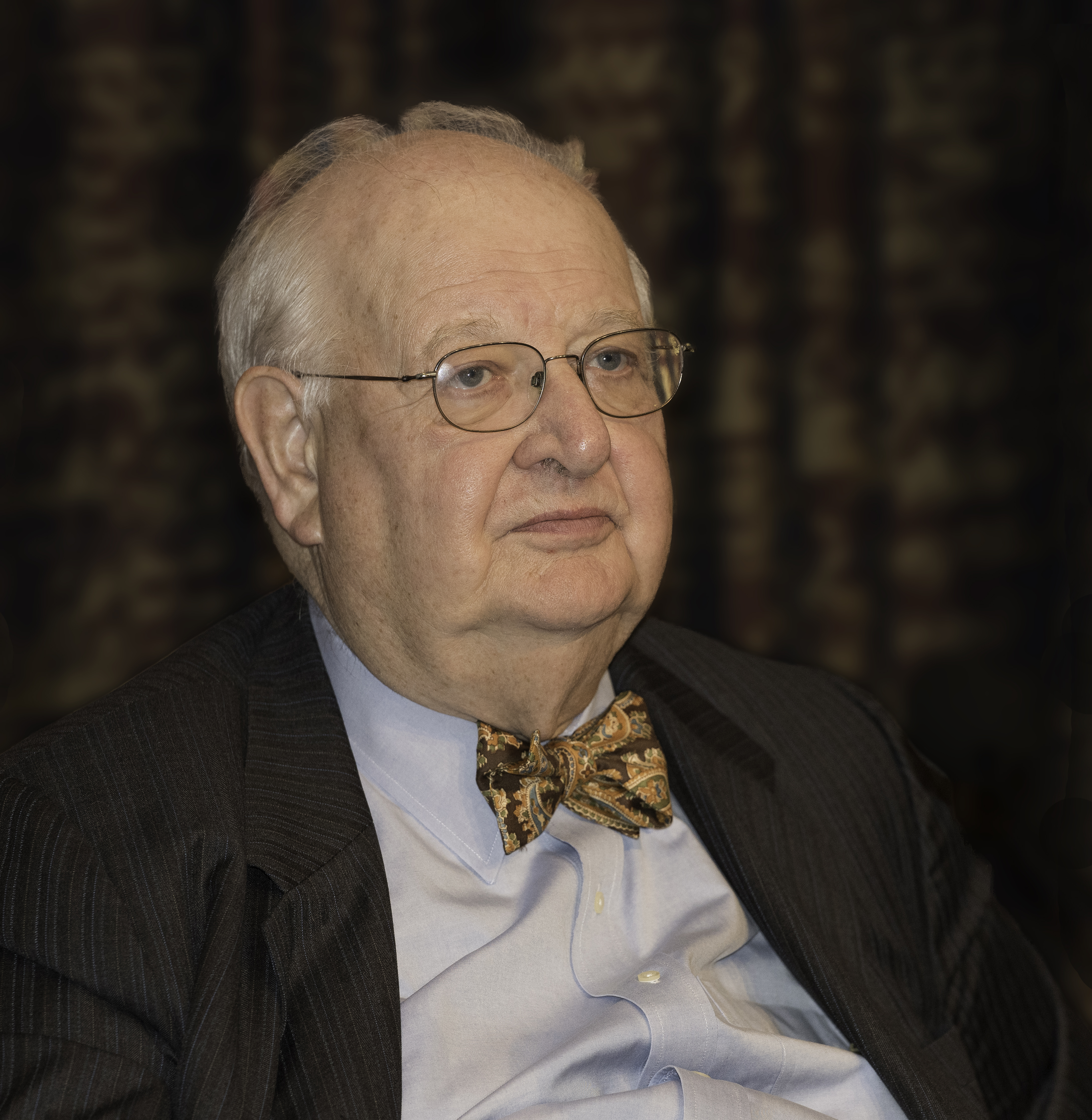
Angus Deaton, economist and winner of the Nobel Prize for Economics (2015)

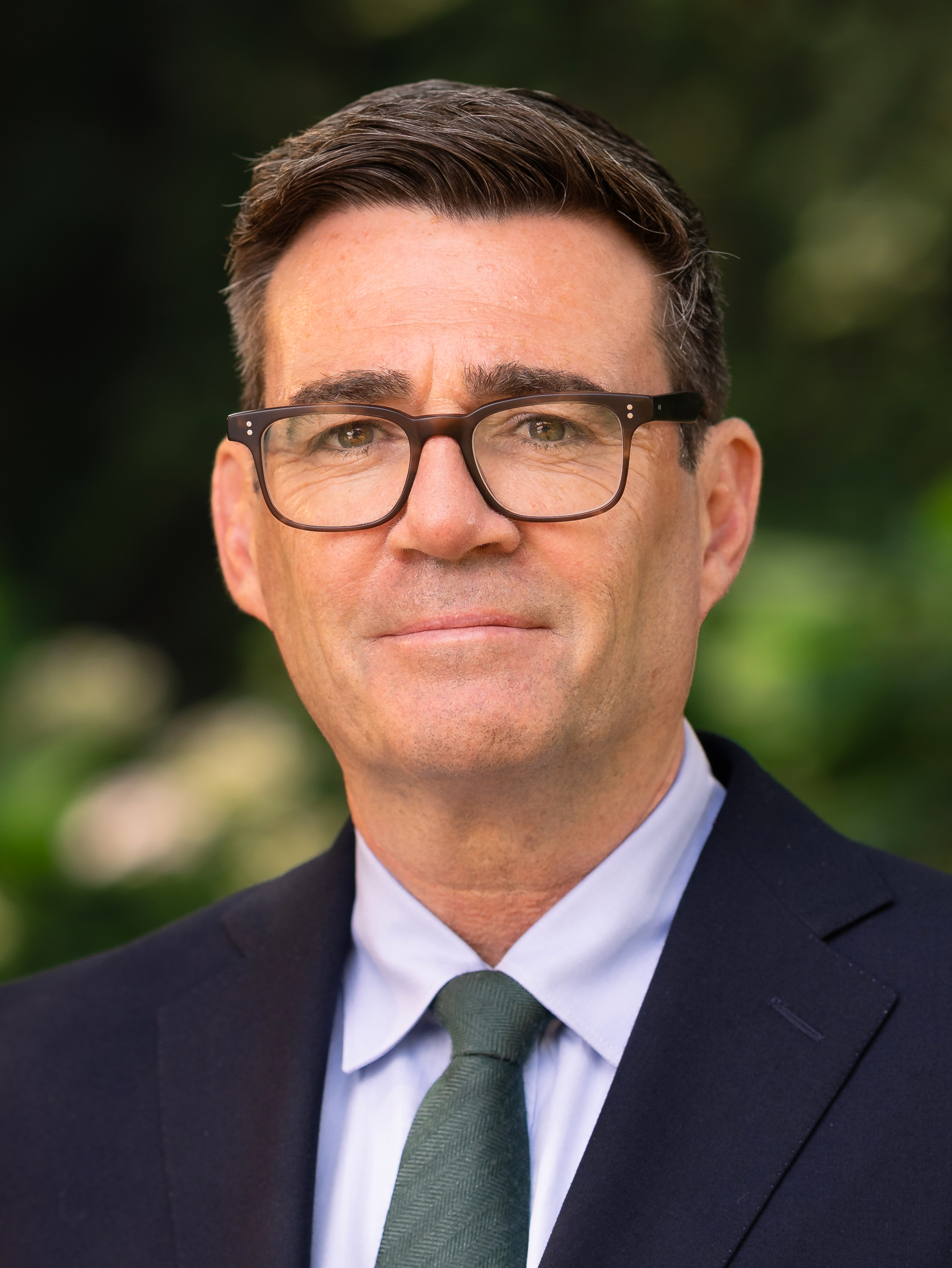
Andy Burnham, politician, Prime Minister of the United Kingdom, Leader of the Labour Party, Mayor of Greater Manchester (2017–2026), Health Secretary (2009–10) and Culture Secretary (2008–09)

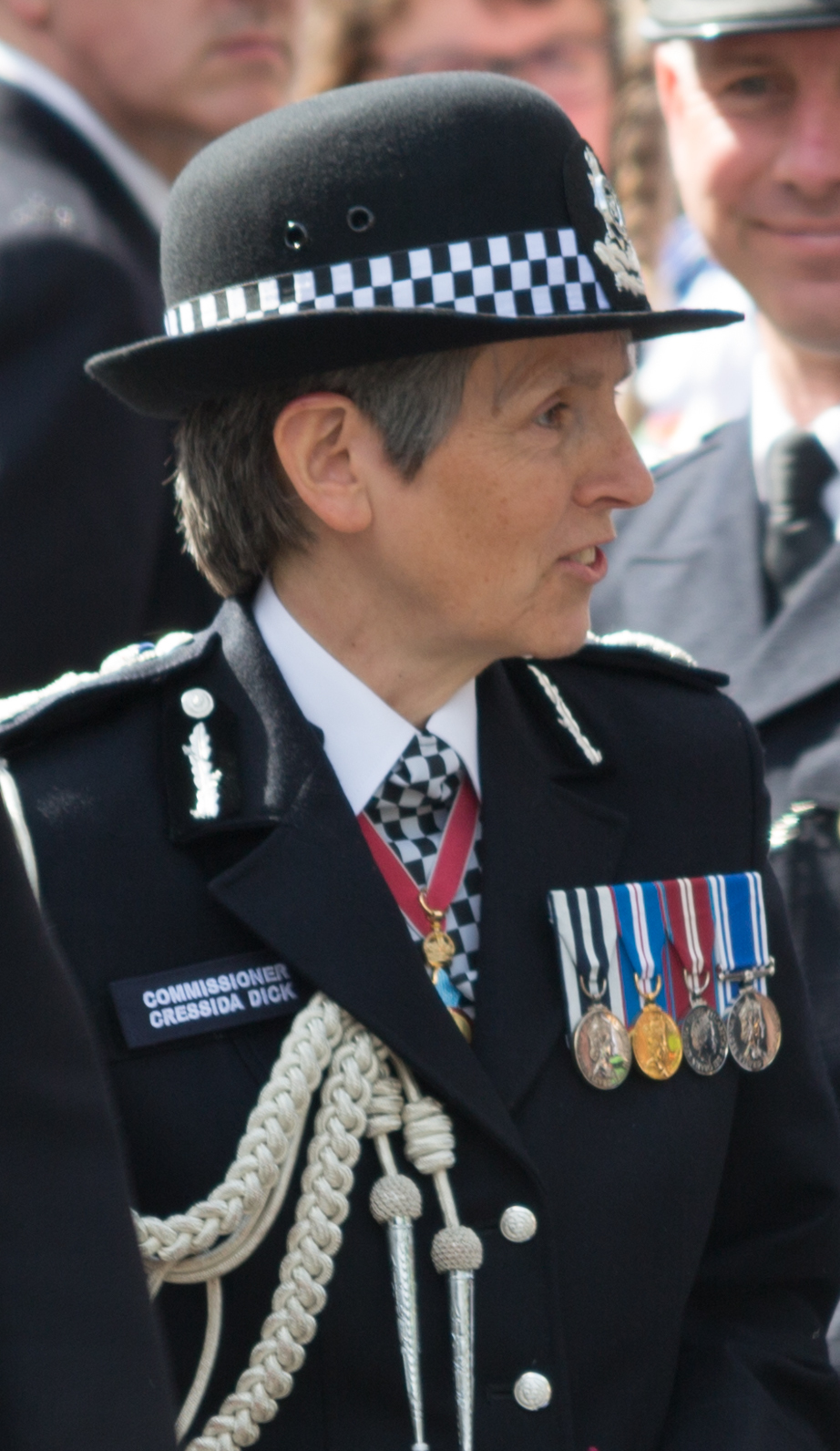
Cressida Dick, first female Commissioner of the Metropolitan Police (2017–22)

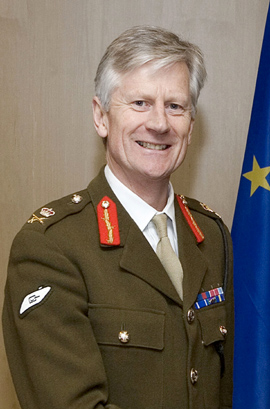
David Leakey, Director General of the European Union Military Staff (2007–10) and Black Rod (2011–18)

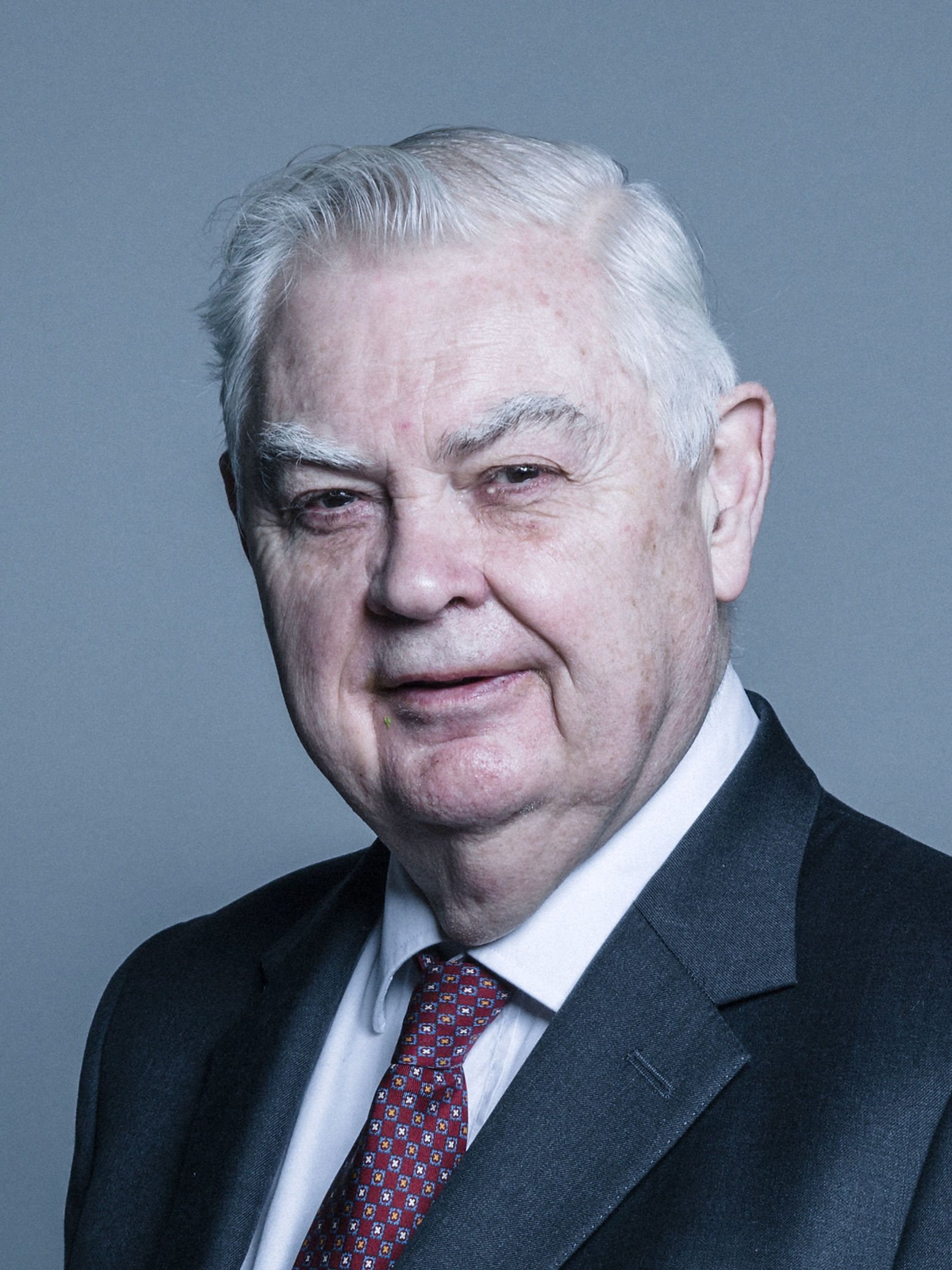
Norman Lamont, politician, Chancellor of the Exchequer (1990–92)

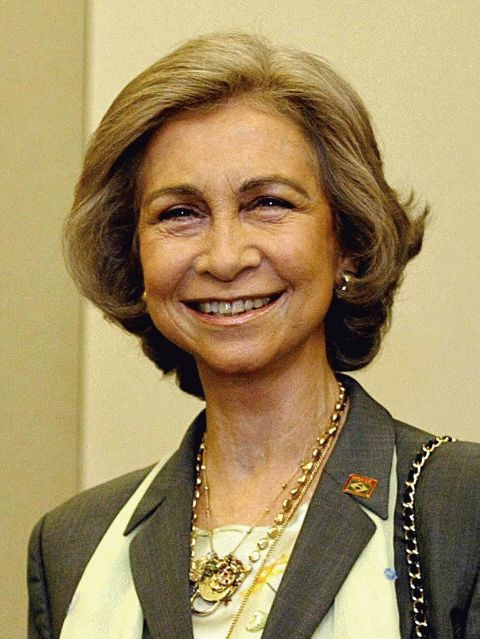
Queen Sofía of Spain, Queen Consort of Spain to Juan Carlos I of Spain (1975–2014)

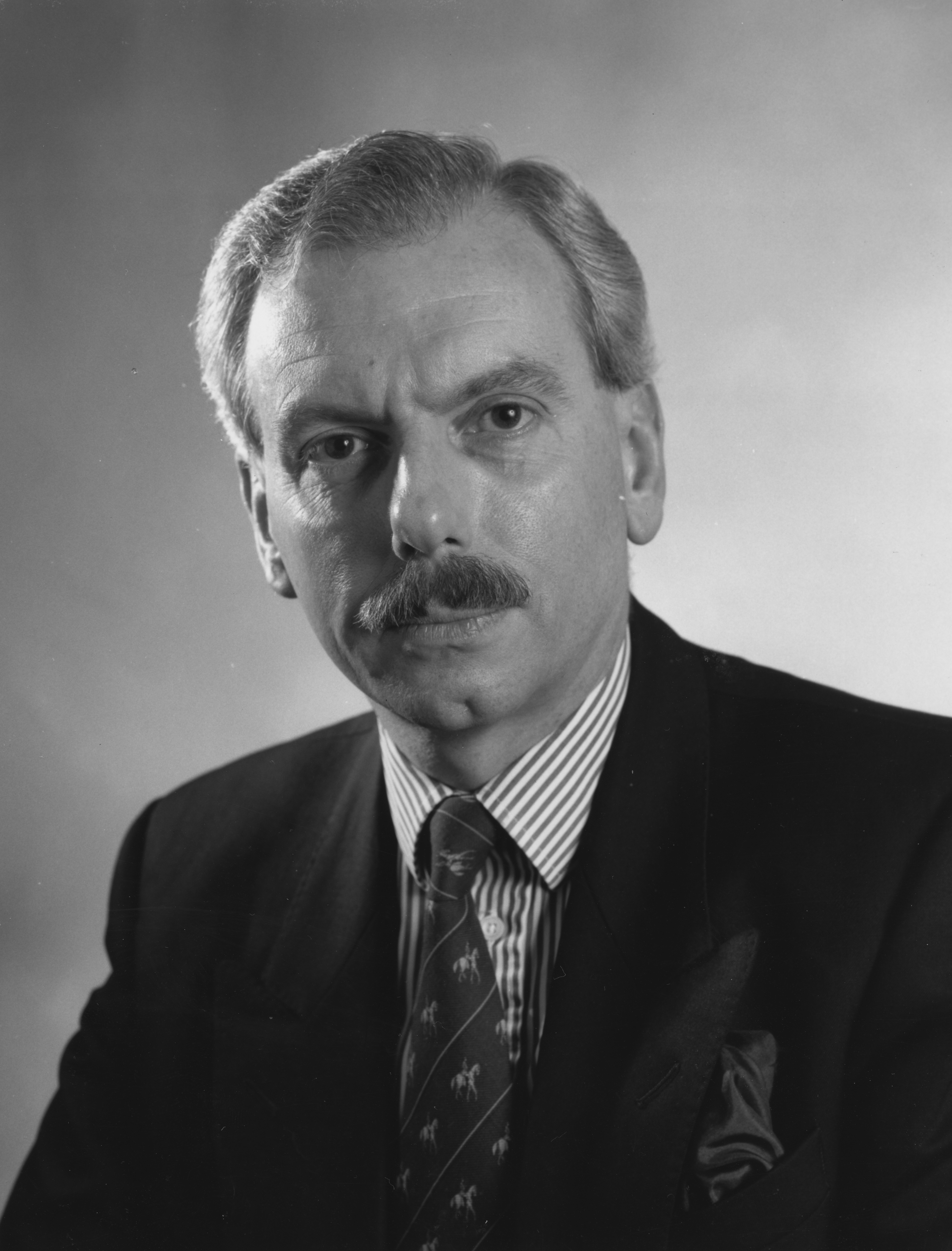
David Starkey, constitutional historian and radio and television presenter

== Notable academics ==
=== Fellows ===
Name	Birth	Death	Career
Reginald C. Fuller	1908	2011	Theologian, co-editor of the Revised Standard Version Catholic Edition
Sir Ernst Boris Chain	1909	1979	Biochemist, winner of the 1945 Nobel Prize in Medicine, for discovering the structure of penicillin
Stanley Alexander de Smith	1922	1974	Legal scholar and author, pioneer in administrative law, Constitutional Commissioner of Mauritius
Sam Toy	1923	2008	Industrialist, Chairman of Ford of Britain
John M Hull	1935	2015	Practical theologian, known for work on blindness and disability
Sir Anthony Bottoms	1939		Criminologist, author
Rhodri Jeffreys-Jones	1942		Historian, expert on American foreign policy
David Pearl	1944		Lawyer, President of the Immigration Appeal Tribunal
Bryan S. Turner	1944		Sociologist, Director of the Centre for the Study of Contemporary Muslim Societies
Sir Angus Deaton	1945		Microeconomist, recipient of the inaugural Frisch Medal and, in 2015, of the Nobel Memorial Prize in Economic Sciences
Clive Wilmer	1945		Poet, art critic, founding editor of Numbers, Director of the Guild of St George (2004–present)
Henry McLeish	1945		Politician, second First Minister of Scotland (2000–2001)
Rosemary Horrox	1951		Medieval historian, College Life Fellow, former Director of Studies in History
Paul Muldoon	1951		Poet, winner of the 1994 T. S. Eliot Prize and the 2003 Pulitzer Prize for Poetry, Oxford Professor of Poetry (1999–2004), President of the Poetry Society (2007–present) and Poetry Editor at The New Yorker
Nicola Padfield KC	1955		Professor of Criminal and Penal Justice
Martin Millett	1955		Archaeologist, Director of the Society of Antiquaries of London
Jonathan Partington	1955		Mathematician, writer of some of the earliest text-based computer games
John Mullan	1957		Literary critic and Booker Prize judge

=== Masters ===
The current Master of the college is Sally Morgan, Baroness Morgan of Huyton, a Labour peer and former chair of Ofsted.

== See also ==
- Listed buildings in Cambridge (west)
