= International Review of Victimology =

- Discipline: Victimology
- Language: English
- Edited by: Joanna Shapland

Publication details
- History: 1989-present
- Publisher: SAGE Publications
- Frequency: Triannually

Standard abbreviations
- ISO 4: Int. Rev. Vict.

Indexing
- CODEN: IRVIE2
- ISSN: 0269-7580 (print); 2047-9433 (web)
- LCCN: sn91025359
- OCLC no.: 21574232

Links
- Journal homepage; Online access; Online archive

The International Review of Victimology is a triannual peer-reviewed academic journal that covers the field of victimology. The editor-in-chief is Joanna Shapland (University of Sheffield) and the editors are Edna Erez (University of Illinois at Chicago), Matthew Hall (Sheffield University), Leslie Sebba (The Hebrew University) and Jo-Anne Wemmers (Université de Montréal). It was established in 1989 and is currently published by SAGE Publications.

The Journal focuses upon traditional areas of victimological research, such as offender typologies, victim-offender Relationship, victimization surveys, victim compensation, the victim in the criminal justice system, reparation and restitution by offenders and crime prevention for victims. The International Review of Victimology also looks at "broader theoretical issues such as definitions of victimization and the philosophy of victimology". This in turn opens the door to the consideration of political and human rights issues, including victims of war crimes, and contribution with a comparative perspective. Occasionally, there are special issues dealing with specific topics. Each issue contains reviews of relevant books.

== History ==
The International Review of Victimology was first published in 1989 under the leadership of John Freeman and Leslie Sebba. The new journal was meant to reflect current developments in the field of victimology, in which leading experts in the field would have an input, not only as contributors, but also in terms of editorial policy and via the peer review process. Unfortunately, at the time of publishing the first issue, it was already clear that John Freeman would have to retire as editor due to health problems. David Miers, originally the associate editor, succeeded John Freeman as editor, working with Leslie Sebba, and Joanna Shapland became associate editor. As the number of submissions and interest in the field of victimology increased, so it was necessary to increase the numbers of editors. Joanna Shapland became editor (subsequently executive editor) in 2002.

The idea of creating an international journal in victimology was conceived at the Third International Symposium on Victimology, which was held in 1979 in Munster (Germany). Finding a publisher who was interested in bringing out the journal was not an easy task. Finally, John Freeman found AB Academic Publishing, a small privately owned company, which was owned by Ena Adams. ABA continued to publish the journal until 2011 when it was sold to SAGE. Since its start, the Review has been published in association with the World Society of Victimology, though it is editorially independent from the WSV.

== Abstracting and indexing ==
The International Review of Victimology is abstracted and indexed in Current Law Index.
