= Sarah Poyntz =

Irish journalist and author (1926–2020)

- Born: 18 March 1926; New Ross, Ireland
- Died: 14 September 2020 (aged 93); Ballyvaughan, Ireland
- Education: University College Dublin (UCD)
- Occupation: Writer
- Partner: Mary Ann Nevins Radzinowicz

Sarah Poyntz (18 March 1926 – 14 September 2020) was an Irish journalist and author. She is known for her contributions over 24 years to The Guardian's Country Diary column, describing The Burren. Some of her columns were subsequently published in book form.

== Early life ==
Poyntz was born in New Ross, County Wexford, in 1926, the daughter of Francis (Frank) Poyntz and Ellen Theresa (Nellie) Murphy Poyntz. Her father was a solicitor. She had an older brother, Jack, and an older sister, Kitty; Kitty died as a teenager, when she drowned with two others near Fethard-on-Sea in 1936.

Poyntz was educated at Loreto Abbey in Gorey, County Wexford and University College Dublin (UCD). She studied with Lorna Reynolds at UCD.

== Career ==
Poyntz initially worked as a teacher in England, and was appointed Head of the English Department at the Perse School for Girls in Cambridge, but took early retirement due to ill health. She used her Irish accent on stage, in a student performance of Juno and the Paycock at the Callington County Grammar School in 1963.

Poyntz lived in New York for a time, while her partner was a professor at Cornell University. In 1986 she moved to Ballyvaughan and in 1987 she began writing for The Guardian's Country Diary column. Her columns were usually about nature, flowers, birds, and sometimes archaeological finds in the area. In 2003 she wrote her column from France, where she observed migrating house martins near the river Mayenne. In 2006 she wrote a book on the villages of The Burren. Poyntz retired from writing in December 2010, at the age of 84.

== Publications ==
- A Burren Journal (2000)
- Memory Emancipated and Poems (2005)
- Burren Villages (2006)

== Personal life ==
Poyntz's partner was American Milton scholar Mary Ann Radzinowicz, who sometimes made appearances in the County Diary columns. Poyntz died from cancer on 14 September 2020, at the age of 93.
