= Joanna Shapland =

British criminologist, forensic psychologist

- Born: Joanna Mary Shapland; 17 February 1950 (age 76)
- Citizenship: United Kingdom

Academic background
- Education: Croydon High School
- Alma mater: St Hilda's College, Oxford; Darwin College, Cambridge; Wolfson College, Oxford
- Thesis: Behaviour and personality in delinquent children (1976)

Academic work
- Discipline: Criminology
- Sub-discipline: Restorative justice; victimology; desistance
- Institutions: King's College, London; Centre for Criminology Research, University of Oxford; Wolfson College, Oxford; University of Sheffield

Joanna Mary Shapland (born 17 February 1950) is a British criminologist, forensic psychologist, and academic, specialising in restorative justice and victimology. Since 2013, she has been Edward Bramley Professor of Criminal Justice at the University of Sheffield. Before joining Sheffield in 1988, she was a research fellow at King's College, London and the University of Oxford. She is executive editor of the International Review of Victimology.

== Early life and education ==
Shapland was born on 17 February 1950. She was educated at Croydon High School, an all-girls private school in London. She studied at St Hilda's College, Oxford, graduating with a Bachelor of Arts (BA) degree in 1971: as per tradition, her BA was promoted to a Master of Arts (MA Oxon). She then undertook a diploma in criminology at Darwin College, Cambridge, which she completed in 1972. She moved to Wolfson College, Oxford to do her Doctor of Philosophy (DPhil) degree. Her doctoral thesis was titled "Behaviour and personality in delinquent children" and was submitted in 1976.

== Career ==
From 1975 to 1978, Shapland was a Home Office research fellow in criminology at King's College, London. She then moved to the University of Oxford where she was a research fellow at the Centre for Criminology Research from 1978 to 1988. While at Oxford she was also a junior research fellow (1979–1983) and then research fellow (1938–1988) at Wolfson College, Oxford.

Shapland joined the University of Sheffield in 1988. She was a senior research fellow at its Centre for Criminology and Socio-Legal Studies from 1988 to 1989. She then joined the Department of Law, where she was a lecturer from 1989 to 1991 and a senior lecturer from 1991 to 1993, before being made Professor of Criminal Justice in 1993. She was head of the School of Law between 2009 and 2013. She was appointed to the Edward Bramley Chair of Criminal Justice in 2013.

== Selected works ==
- Shapland, Joanna; Willmore, Jon; Duff, Peter (1985). Victims in the criminal justice system. Aldershot: Gower. ISBN 978-0566008948.
- Shapland, Joanna; Vagg, Jon (1988). Policing by the public. London: Routledge. ISBN 978-0415006910.
- Bottoms, Anthony; Shapland, Joanna; Costello, Andrew; Holmes, Deborah; Muir, Grant (September 2004). "Towards Desistance: Theoretical Underpinnings for an Empirical Study" (PDF). The Howard Journal of Criminal Justice. 43 (4): 368–389. doi:10.1111/j.1468-2311.2004.00336.x.
- Shapland, Joanna; Robinson, Gwen; Sorsby, Angela (2011). Restorative justice in practice: evaluating what works for victims and offenders. London: Routledge. ISBN 978-1843928461.
- Shapland, Joanna; Hall, Matthew, eds. (2015). Victimology. London: Routledge. ISBN 978-1472439673.
