= Leon Radzinowicz =

Polish academic and criminologist (1906–1999)

Professor Sir Leon Radzinowicz QC (Hon) FBA

1st Wolfson Professor of Criminology
- In office 1959–1973
- Succeeded by: Nigel Walker

1st Director of the Cambridge Institute of Criminology
- In office 1959–1972

Personal details
- Born: 15 August 1906 Łódź, Poland
- Died: 29 December 1999 (aged 93) Haverford, Pennsylvania, United States
- Resting place: Ascension Parish Burial Ground, Cambridge, England
- Spouses: Irene Szereszewsk (m. 1933; div. 1955) Mary Ann Nevins (m. 1958; div. 1979) Isolde Klarmann (m. 1979)
- Children: Two

Sir Leon Radzinowicz, QC (Hon), FBA (15 August 1906 – 29 December 1999) was a Polish criminologist and academic. He was the founding director of the Institute of Criminology at the Faculty of Law at the University of Cambridge.

== Early life and education ==
Radzinowicz was born on 15 August 1906 in Łódź, Congress Poland. He studied law as an undergraduate student at the University of Paris and the University of Geneva. He went on to study for a doctorate at the University of Cracow. During this time, he spent a year studying under Enrico Ferri at the Institute of Criminology in Rome, Italy. Radzinowicz moved to England in 1938, having been granted funding by the Polish Ministry of Justice to study the English legal system.

== Academic career ==
During World War II, Radzinowicz established the Department of Criminal Science in the Faculty of Law at the University of Cambridge. From 1949 to 1959, Radzinowicz was Director of the Department of Criminal Science, University of Cambridge. In 1959, he founded the Institute of Criminology at the Faculty of Law, University of Cambridge. In 1959, he became the first Wolfson Professor of Criminology at the Institute of Criminology. Radzinowicz made a major contribution to the study of criminology by his research in the trends of legal thought which led to modern concepts in the administration of justice which were adopted in many of the democratic countries. Among his most significant works are History of English Criminal Law (4 vols. 1948–68), In Search of Criminology (1961), The Need for Criminology (1965), and Ideology and Crime (1966). Radzinowicz also wrote an autobiography, Adventures in Criminology (1999).

== Death ==
On 29 December 1999, Radzinowicz died in Haverford, Pennsylvania, United States. He was aged 93. He is buried with his third wife in the Ascension Parish Burial Ground in Cambridge, Cambridgeshire, England.

== Personal life ==
Radzinowicz had married three times. He married Irena Szereszewska in 1933; they divorced in 1955. He was married to Mary Ann Nevins from 1958 to 1979. They had two children: Ann and William. In 1979, he married Isolde Klarmann (née Doerenburg; 11 October 1915 – 2 February 2011). Radzinowicz converted to Christianity from Judaism prior to World War II.

== Honours ==
In the 1970 New Years Honours, Radzinowicz was appointed a Knight Bachelor in recognition of his work at the University of Cambridge. On 24 February 1970, he was knighted by Queen Elizabeth II during a ceremony at Buckingham Palace. In 1973, he was elected a Fellow of the British Academy (FBA). On 13 April 1999, he was appointed an honorary Queen's Counsel (QC).
