= Nigel Walker (criminologist) =

English criminologist (1917-2014)

Professor Nigel Walker, CBE (6 August 1917 – 13 September 2014) was Wolfson Professor of Criminology at King's College, Cambridge.

== Biography ==
Walker was born in Tianjin China (formerly Tientsin), on 6 August 1917, as a result of his father's posting there as British vice-consul. He attended Edinburgh Academy being awarded Dux in 1935.

After school, he read classics at Christ Church, Oxford, and became a civil servant.

During World War II, he served with the Queen's Own Cameron Highlanders and Lovat Scouts, being shot on active service in Italy.

In 1979, he was appointed CBE.

== Academic career ==
During his time the Scottish Office he was awarded a PhD (1954) by the University of Edinburgh for his thesis on The Logical Status of the Freudian Unconscious and a book A Short History of Psychotherapy. He then took up one-year research fellowship for civil servants in Nuffield College, Oxford, from which research he published Morale in the Civil Service (1961). He published a first volume of a history of the insanity defence, Crime and Insanity in England (1968), for which he was awarded DLitt by Oxford University, and honorary fellowship of the Royal College of Psychiatrists. His student textbook Crime and Punishment in Britain (1965) was also influential.

Writing in 1965, Walker suggested the replacement of a single age of criminal responsibility by different minimum ages for varying forms of treatment.

Between 1973 and 1984 he was Wolfson Professor of Criminology, and a Fellow of King's College, Cambridge. His work challenged many accepted beliefs in the study of criminology, and he had an interest in the rehabilitation of offenders, writing Sentencing in a Rational Society (1969). He retired in 1984, but continued to teach and write, notably Why Punish? (1991) and Dangerous People (1996). He wrote "in private I am as vindictive as any reader of The Daily Telegraph when some particularly evil offender is brought to justice, I simply question whether it is useful or morally justifiable to think in terms of desert rather than deterrence, correction or prevention when sentencing him."

During his teaching career, he spent time at Yale where his students included Bill Clinton and Hillary Clinton, then as yet unmarried.
