= University of Cambridge Philharmonic Orchestra =

The University of Cambridge Philharmonic Orchestra (UCPO) is a British amateur orchestra and a student-run orchestra in Cambridge, England, United Kingdom.

UCPO is a non-audition orchestra. Membership is aimed primarily at members of the University of Cambridge, although the orchestra usually counts among its members a significant number of other residents of Cambridge. Only conductors and soloists are auditioned.

The orchestra usually performs five concerts in each year. Three of these feature the full orchestra. A further two are performed by a smaller group officially known as the 'University of Cambridge Philharmonia', informally known as 'Baby'.

2015/16 repertoire included selections from Tchaikovsky's Nutcracker Suite danced by representatives of Cambridge University Ballet Club (as part of UCPO's inaugural 'Gala Concert'), Strauss' Fledermaus Overture, Elgar's 'Cello Concerto in E minor, Beethoven's Symphony No. 4 and Dvorak's Violin Concerto. Previous repertoire is just as varied, and has included Brahms, Sibelius, Bizet, Shostakovich and Haydn.

== History ==
UCPO was founded in the early 1990s as the West Cambridge Symphony Orchestra, WCSO.

The orchestra was started as an offshoot of Fitzwilliam College Music Society (FCMS), which provided grants to help fund the early years. Members were taken principally from Fitzwilliam, Churchill and New Hall colleges. In 1995, the orchestra broke its ties with Fitz and expanded, rehearsing in Peterhouse and taking musicians from any college. The original role of WCSO is now filled by The Orchestra on the Hill.

In the early years following the split from Fitz, WCSO was organised in a relatively informal way, regularly making a loss that was recouped each year by combining the Easter concert with a garden party and 'giving away' drinks to those guests who 'bought raffle tickets'. Each treasurer had to cover losses personally. This situation started to resolve from 1998 onwards, with the creation of a specific orchestral bank account and a greater emphasis on publicity.

After this, WCSO started to grow and change in character, with an increasingly formal committee structure, more ambitious programmes, and an increasing sense of professionalism. Rehearsals outgrew most college rehearsal rooms, and the Wesley Methodist Church was chosen as a venue from 1999. Throughout, the orchestra remained committed to the principle of having no auditions, and accepting anyone for whom there was a musical part.

An increasingly large membership brought new musical opportunities, but also new limits in which pieces could be attempted. Sectional pieces were introduced in an attempt to give everyone a chance to play, before the decision was made to start a chamber orchestra to increase the possible range. The West Cambridge Sinfonia, or 'Baby' as it quickly became known, has grown rapidly since its introduction.

In 2001, the orchestra moved to a new home at Selwyn College, rehearsing in the Selwyn Diamond.

At the start of 2002, and after a lively debate at the AGM, the decision was made to change the name of the orchestra to UCPO. The principal argument was that the orchestra was no longer tied to West Cambridge physically.

UCPO's ties with Cambridge colleges ended in 2007, apart from the current rehearsal space for the Philharmonia, Queens' College, and some concert venues. Since October 2007, the main orchestra has rehearsed at St Giles' Church.
