= Wolfson Professor of Criminology =

Senior professorship at the University of Cambridge

The Wolfson Professor of Criminology is a senior professorship at the University of Cambridge. The position was established in 1960 by a benefaction by the Wolfson Foundation and is the first of its kind in Britain. The position's first holder was Sir Leon Radzinowicz.

== Wolfson Professors of Criminology ==
- Sir Leon Radzinowicz, 1959–1973
- Nigel Walker, 1973–1984
- Sir Anthony Bottoms, 1984–2006
- Lawrence W. Sherman, 2006–2017
- Manuel Eisner, 2017–present
