= Cambridge Institute of Criminology =

University department

Institute of Criminology
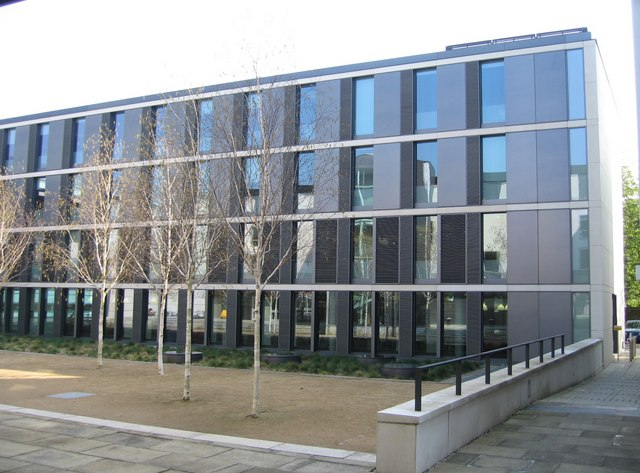
- Type: Department of the University of Cambridge
- Established: 1959
- Parent institution: Faculty of Law
- Director: Professor Manuel Eisner
- Location: Sidgwick Site, Cambridge, United Kingdom
- Website: www.crim.cam.ac.uk

The Institute of Criminology is the criminological research institute within the Faculty of Law at the University of Cambridge. The Institute is one of the oldest criminological research institutes in Europe, and has exerted a strong influence on the development of criminology. Its multidisciplinary teaching and research staff are recruited from the disciplines of law, psychiatry, psychology, and sociology. It is located on the Sidgwick Site in the west of Cambridge, England. The Institute of Criminology building was designed by Allies and Morrison. The Institute is also home to the Radzinowicz Library, which houses the most comprehensive criminology collection in the United Kingdom. The Institute has approximately 50 PhD students, 30-40 M.Phil. students, and 200 M.St students. The Institute also offers courses to Cambridge undergraduates, particularly in law, but also in human social and political sciences and in psychology and behavioural sciences.

== History ==
During World War II, Sir Leon Radzinowicz established the Department of Criminal Science in the Faculty of Law at the University of Cambridge. In 1959, as the field of criminology was met with increasing interest and success, Sir Leon Radzinowicz founded the Institute of Criminology with the support of a benefaction from the Wolfson Foundation and the Howard League for Penal Reform.

== Research centres ==
The Institute publishes the Cambridge Crime Harm Index (CCHI), which is the first system that measures the seriousness of crime harm to victims.

- Centre for Analytic Criminology
- Centre for Penal Theory and Penal Ethics
- Jerry Lee Centre for Experimental Criminology
- Justice and Society Research Centre
- Prisons Research Centre
- Violence Research Centre

== Academic courses ==
The Institute offers a number of different courses, including:

- a ten-month M.Phil. Degree in Criminology;
- a two-year Master of Studies (M.St) Degree in applied criminology, penology and management (Cambridge Penology Programme), which is a postgraduate programme;
- a two-year Master of Studies (M.St) Degree in applied criminology and police management (Police Executive Programme), which is a postgraduate programme;
- a Ph.D. programme in Criminology;
- various undergraduate courses for Cambridge students in law, psychology, and sociology, including a joint sociology/criminology degree.

== Notable people ==
- Sir Leon Radzinowicz: the Founder of the Institute of Criminology and the first Wolfson Professor of Criminology.
- Sir Anthony Bottoms: Emeritus Wolfson Professor of Criminology, former Director of the Institute, Director of the Centre for Penal Theory and Penal Ethics.
- Ben Crewe: Professor of Penology and Criminal Justice, Prisons Research Centre.
- Manuel Eisner: Director of the Institute, Wolfson Professor of Criminology and Professor of Comparative and Developmental Criminology, Director of the Violence Research Centre.
- David Farrington: Emeritus Professor of Psychological Criminology
- Loraine Gelsthorpe: Emerita Professor of Criminology and Criminal Justice, former Director of the Institute, Director of the Centre for Community, Gender and Social Justice.
- Alison Liebling: Professor of Criminology and Criminal Justice, Director of the Prisons Research Centre.
- Lawrence Sherman: Director of the Cambridge Police Executive Programme.
- Heather Strang: Director of the Lee Centre of Experimental Criminology.
- David A. Thomas
- Per-Olof Wikström: Professor of Ecological and Developmental Criminology.

== Alumni ==
- Stephen Brown, former Deputy Commissioner, Western Australia Police Force, Master of Studies, Applied Criminology and Police Management
- Robert Carden, Chief constable, Merseyside Police, Master of Studies, Applied Criminology and Police Management
- Cressida Dick, former Commissioner of Police of the Metropolis, Master of Studies, Applied Criminology and Police Management, 2000
- Bernard Hogan-Howe, QPM, former Commissioner of Police of the Metropolis, Postgraduate Diploma, Applied Criminology
- Serena Kennedy, former Chief constable, Merseyside Police, Master of Studies, Applied Criminology and Police Management
- Zoe McKee, Detective Chief Superintendent, Police Service of Northern Ireland, Master of Studies, Applied Criminology and Police Leadership
- Gavin McKinnon, Order of the British Empire (OBE), Assistant Chief Officer, Kent Police
- Deborah Platz, Queensland Human Rights Commission, former senior police official, Master of Studies, Applied Criminology and Police Management
- Stephen Williams, Police commissioner, Trinidad and Tobago Police Service
