= Los Angeles Police Department resources =

Resources and systems used by the Los Angeles Police Department

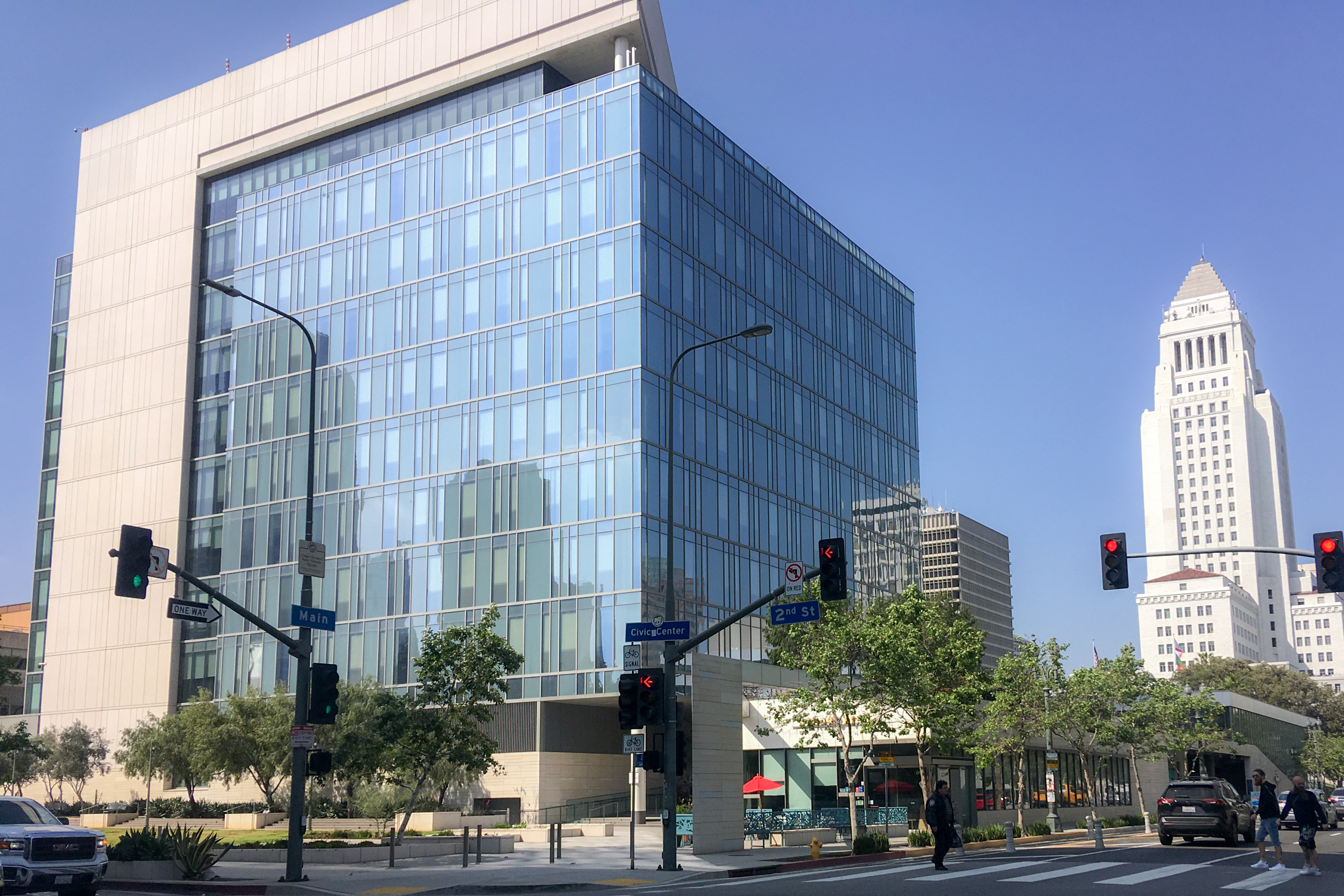
LAPD Headquarters in downtown Los Angeles, across from City Hall

The Los Angeles Police Department (LAPD), the primary law enforcement agency of Los Angeles, California, United States, maintains and uses a variety of resources that allow its officers to effectively perform their duties. The LAPD's organization is complex with the department divided into bureaus and offices that oversee functions and manage specialized units. The LAPD's resources include the department's divisions, transportation, communications, and technology.

== Police stations ==
The LAPD's deployment of officers has reflected the growth and changes of Los Angeles since the late 19th century. The earliest LAPD police station (or community station or division, originating from the "Patrol Division") was Central Division, located in Downtown Los Angeles on the southeast corner of 1st and Hill. This station opened in 1896 and was the department's first dedicated police station (another had been located at 2nd and Spring, but was possibly a leased or rented storefront type of set-up). The Central Jail was located directly south of it. "Old Central", as it came to be known, housed not only Central Division but also many of the department's headquarters units until its closure in about 1955 in favor of Parker Center and Central Community Police Station.

The city's largest growth period was from approximately the late 19th century through the 1930s when the city grew at a geometric rate. Approximately 100 smaller portions were added to the original five square mile pueblo. Of these, about 90 were formerly unincorporated areas. The remaining ten portions had been their own incorporated cities, and included the cities of Watts, Venice, Hollywood, San Pedro, Wilmington, Barnes, Hyde Park, Eagle Rock, Sawtelle, and Tujunga. When the city consolidated another existing city, its police officers became LAPD officers with corresponding ranks and titles at the LAPD, per the city charter. The LAPD would then create a new division named after the city that had been consolidated and would continue using the former city's police station, usually replacing these facilities with larger renamed police stations within a few years.

The LAPD's area community police stations are organized into area Patrol Divisions, commanded by a Captain I. Patrol Divisions are grouped into four geographic operations bureaus; Operations-Central, South, Valley and West Bureau, commanded by a Deputy Chief. These bureaus are under the Office of Operations, commanded by an Assistant Chief. Offices only report to the Chief of Police and aren't organized into any larger entity. The following is a list of LAPD community stations (patrol divisions), along with their original division numbers:

- 01 Central Police Station, 251 East 6th Street 90014
- 02 Rampart Police Station, 1401 West 6th Street 90017
- 03 Southwest Police Station, 1546 West Martin Luther King Jr. Boulevard 90062
- 04 Hollenbeck Police Station, 2111 East 1st St 90033
- 05 San Pedro Police Station, 2175 John S Gibson Boulevard 90731
- 06 Hollywood Police Station, 1358 North Wilcox Avenue 90028
- 07 Wilshire Police Station, 4861 West Venice Boulevard 90019
- 08 West Los Angeles Police Station, 1663 South Butler Avenue 90025
- 09 Van Nuys Police Station, 6240 Sylmar Avenue 91401
- 10 West Valley Substation, 19020 Vanowen Street 91335
- 11 Northeast Police Station, 3353 North San Fernando Road 90065
- 12 77th Street Police Station,7600 South Broadway 90003
- 13 Newton Street Police Station, 3400 South Central Ave 90011
- 14 Pacific Police Station, 12312 West Culver Boulevard 90066
- 15 North Hollywood Police Station, 11640 Burbank Boulevard 91601
- 16 Foothill Police Station, 12760 Osborne Street 91331
- 17 Devonshire Police Station, 10250 Etiwanda Avenue 91324
- 18 Southeast Police Station, 145 West 108th Street 90061
- 19 Mission Police Station, 11121 North Sepulveda Boulevard 91345
- 20 Olympic Police Station, 1130 South Vermont Avenue 90006
- 21 Topanga Police Station, 21501 Schoenborn Street 91304

== Transportation ==
=== Patrol cars ===
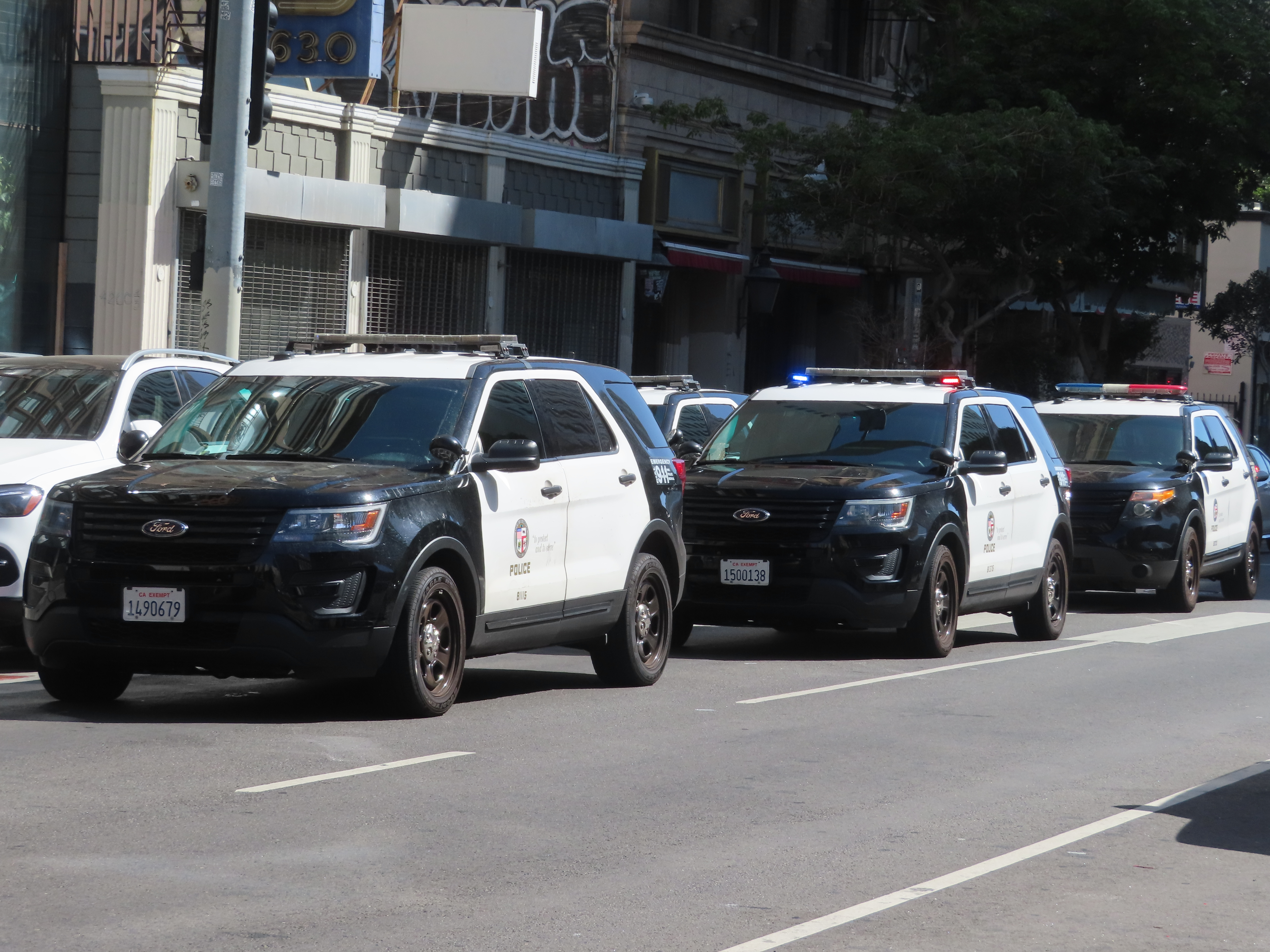
Marked LAPD Ford Police Interceptor Utility cruisers

The Ford Police Interceptor Utility is the LAPD's primary vehicle, mainly used for patrol operations. Models in use range from 2013 to 2025. The LAPD also uses the Ford Police Interceptor Sedan, however it is mostly seen used by area traffic divisions, not by patrol. The LAPD, as of 2025 usually uses marked versions of the Ford Crown Victoria Police Interceptor and Dodge Charger Pursuit as auxiliary cars when supplemental vehicles are needed for large-scale situations such as riot deployments. It is important to mention that slicktop versions of both FPIUs, FPIS' and CVPIs can be seen on the streets, which area gang units within the LAPD use. Chevrolet Impala 9C1s and Dodge Challenger were also purchased in small numbers in the 2000s. With the Ford Crown Victoria's discontinuation in 2011 and the Ford Taurus' discontinuation in 2019, the LAPD has shifted from sedans to crossovers, purchasing primarily the Ford Police Interceptor Utility. The LAPD also uses a small number of Chevrolet Tahoe PPVs, though they are gradually decommissioning them due to their poor gas mileage.

LAPD vehicles are ordered painted in black clearcoat with the roof, doors, and pillars painted white from the factory, though some vehicles assigned to special divisions, such as K-9 or the bomb squad, may be painted all-white or all-black. Options available from Ford ordered by the LAPD today include dual pillar-mounted Unity spotlights, 16-inch heavy duty steel wheels with chrome center caps, and ballistic panels within the two front doors. Most LAPD patrol cars bear at least two rear bumper stickers: one reading "There's NO Excuse - For Domestic Violence", and another reading "Watch The Road - Operation Traffix". On the rear side panel is a black and white sticker that reads "EMERGENCY DIAL 9-1-1 Fire Police Medical." The front door design is similar to most other city government fleet vehicles, and consists of the city seal, the department slogan ("to protect and to serve"), the five-digit "shop number" (a fleet vehicle identification number custom to the city government; format "00000"), and city department name ("POLICE"). The last three numbers of the shop number are reprinted on the roof to help air units visually identify cars. On the trunk is a number that identifies which division the unit belongs to (e.g. 25 would be "South Traffic Division", or 03 would be "Southwest Area"). The LAPD has used the same black-and-white paint scheme and markings since roughly 1940 with minimal modifications.

==== Unmarked cars ====
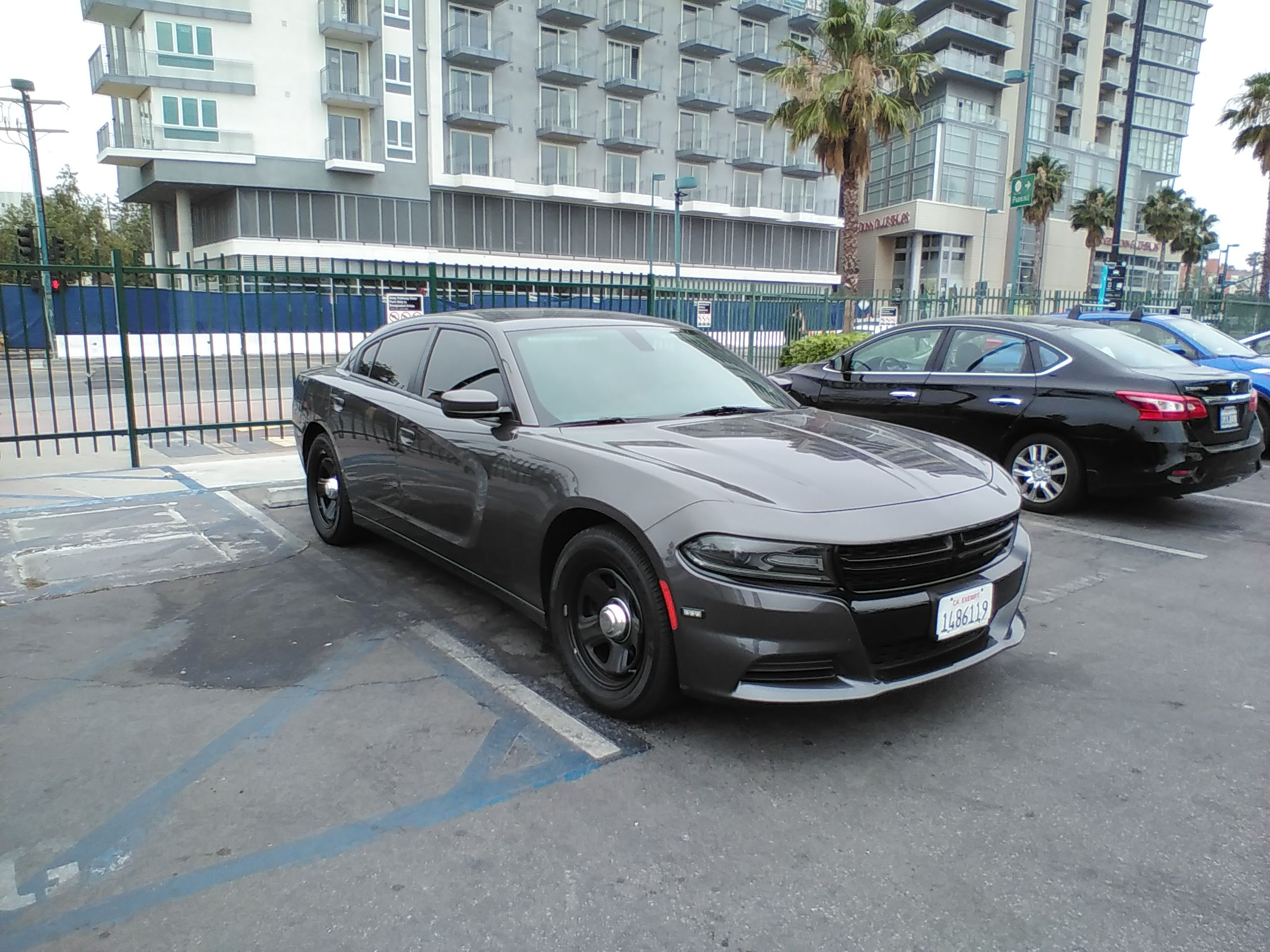
An unmarked LAPD Dodge Charger. The LAPD did not purchase marked Dodge Chargers past 2014, but continued to purchase them for unmarked use.

The LAPD has many unmarked vehicles, primarily used by special units such as gang units, detectives, SWAT, and some traffic units. They are usually assigned Ford Crown Victorias, Ford Explorers, Dodge Chargers, Chevrolet Impalas, and Chevrolet Tahoes.

Certain investigative units, such as detectives, vice, special investigations, homicide units, may be assigned civilian vehicles that are not normally used for police work, ranging from civilian models of cruisers (such as Ford Crown Victorias, Ford Explorers, Dodge Chargers, Chevrolet Tahoes) to common civilian vehicles (such as Honda Civics and Chevrolet Silverados). These differentiate from traditional unmarked cruisers due to their prevalence among regular civilian traffic and their lack of police equipment.

==== Special vehicles ====
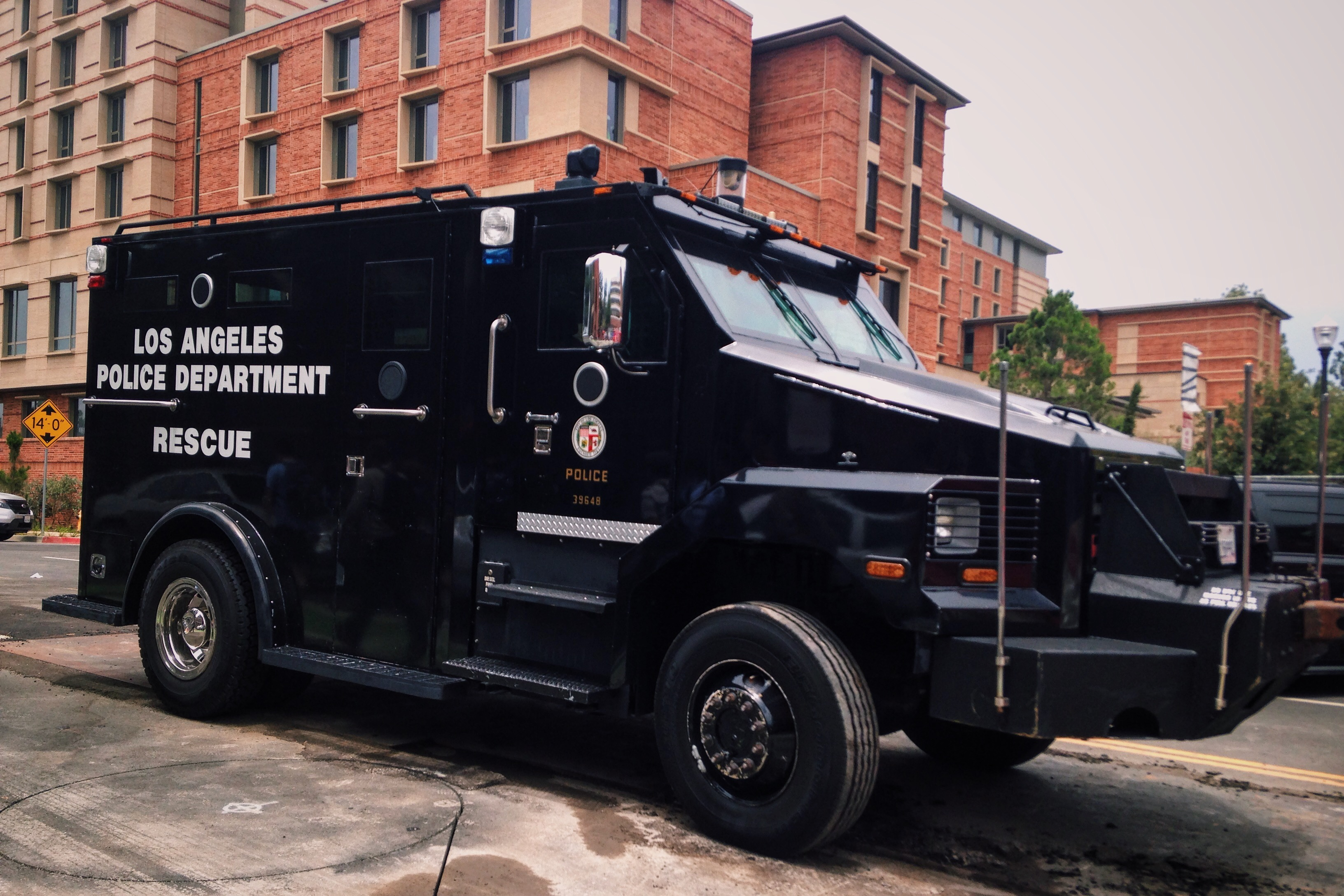
An LAPD SWAT Lenco Bear at UCLA, after a shooting at the campus in 2016

The LAPD Metropolitan Division SWAT operates a fleet of unmarked Chevrolet Suburbans and Chevrolet Tahoes alongside regular unmarked cruisers. They also operate a fleet of armored SWAT vehicles, primarily Lenco BearCats and possibly also a Cadillac Gage Commando, which are designated as "Rescue" vehicles. As well as specialized variant M113 APCs.

The bomb squad and the K-9 unit both operate a mix of all-white cruisers and pickup trucks (the bomb squad also operates all-black vehicles as well), such as the Ford Police Interceptor Utility and the GMC Sierra. The bomb squad also operated a custom Peterbilt 367 with a Total Containment Vessel until June 2021, when it was destroyed after illegal fireworks accidentally detonated while being stored in the truck.

The LAPD uses various trucks, including a Peterbilt used to move a mobile command center trailer, and several retired military flatbeds acquired from the 1033 Program. At least two modified Pierce rescue trucks are used by SWAT and the bomb squad. The LAPD also uses several vans, with white Ford E-Series, Ford Transit, Chevrolet Express, and Chevrolet Astro vans being used for transport, administrative, and special purposes. The LAPD Honor Guard is transported in a white Ford Transit.

The LAPD briefly had a Lamborghini Gallardo with a black-and-white livery and patrol-specification lighting. The Gallardo was loaned to the department in 2014 and was used to promote the Air Support Division at several promotional events. As it was on loan and has not made any further appearances, it is likely no longer used by the department. Other vehicles the LAPD uses to promote recruitment include the Hummer H3 and the GMC Yukon.

On September 11, 2015, the Mayor of Los Angeles announced a plan to lease 160 battery electric vehicles and 128 plug-in hybrids for city department use. In 2016, the LAPD leased a Tesla Model S and a BMW i3 for testing purposes, and decided to purchase 100 BMW i3s for administrative and non-emergency duties. However, they were almost never used due to concerns over their low mileage, and were decommissioned and sold in bulk for $19,000 each in 2020.

A cruiser with 1-Adam-12 markings is used by Central Division to reward officers for "outstanding duty performance". It was activated in 2003. It is unknown if the vehicle is still used. A specially-marked 2001 Ford Crown Victoria with an older Federal Signal Aerodynic lightbar (used by the LAPD in the 1980s and 1990s) is used by officers assigned to patrol Panorama Mall; despite its visible age, it is still in service as of November 2020.

=== Motorcycles ===
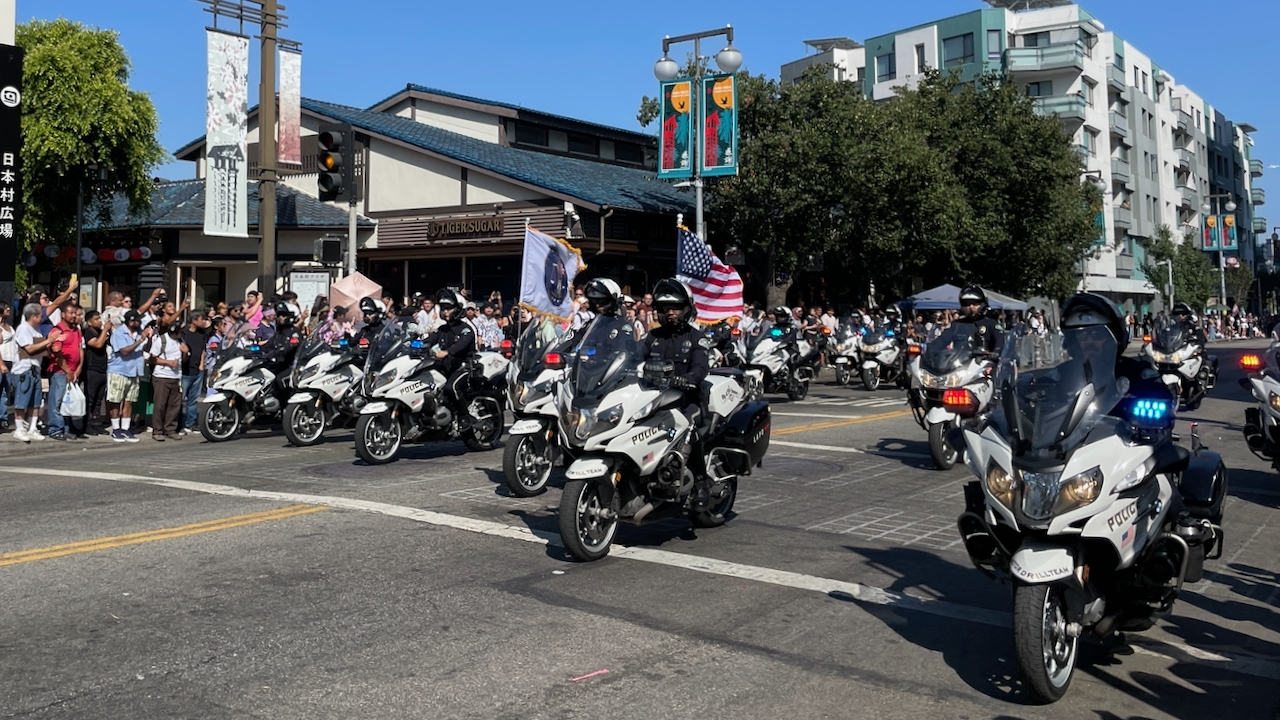
Members of LAPD's Motor Drill Team ride in a parade in 2025.

The LAPD motor unit is one of the oldest and largest in the world, celebrating its 100th anniversary in 2009 with 304 sworn motor officers on its rolls at the time, 259 officers, 32 sergeants, 1 lieutenant, and 12 reserve officers. The LAPD is also unique in that it allows retired motor officers to further supplement that number for events or other permitted activities to handle traffic control and non-law enforcement roles due to the volume of public activities that occur within the city.

Indian, Thor, Excelsior-Henderson, Harley-Davidson, Moto Guzzi, Honda, Kawasaki, and BMW motorcycles have all been represented in LAPD's fleet, which currently consists primarily of Harley-Davidson FLHP and BMW R1250RT-P motorcycles. LAPD motorcycles are painted black and white and carry a radio, emergency lights, a long gun, police equipment, and police documentation. The LAPD was also one of the first departments to test and operate a small fleet of Zero electric motorcycles and scooters. Motorcycle units are typically not deployed during rainy or inclement weather, during which traffic units patrol in cruisers.

=== Aircraft ===
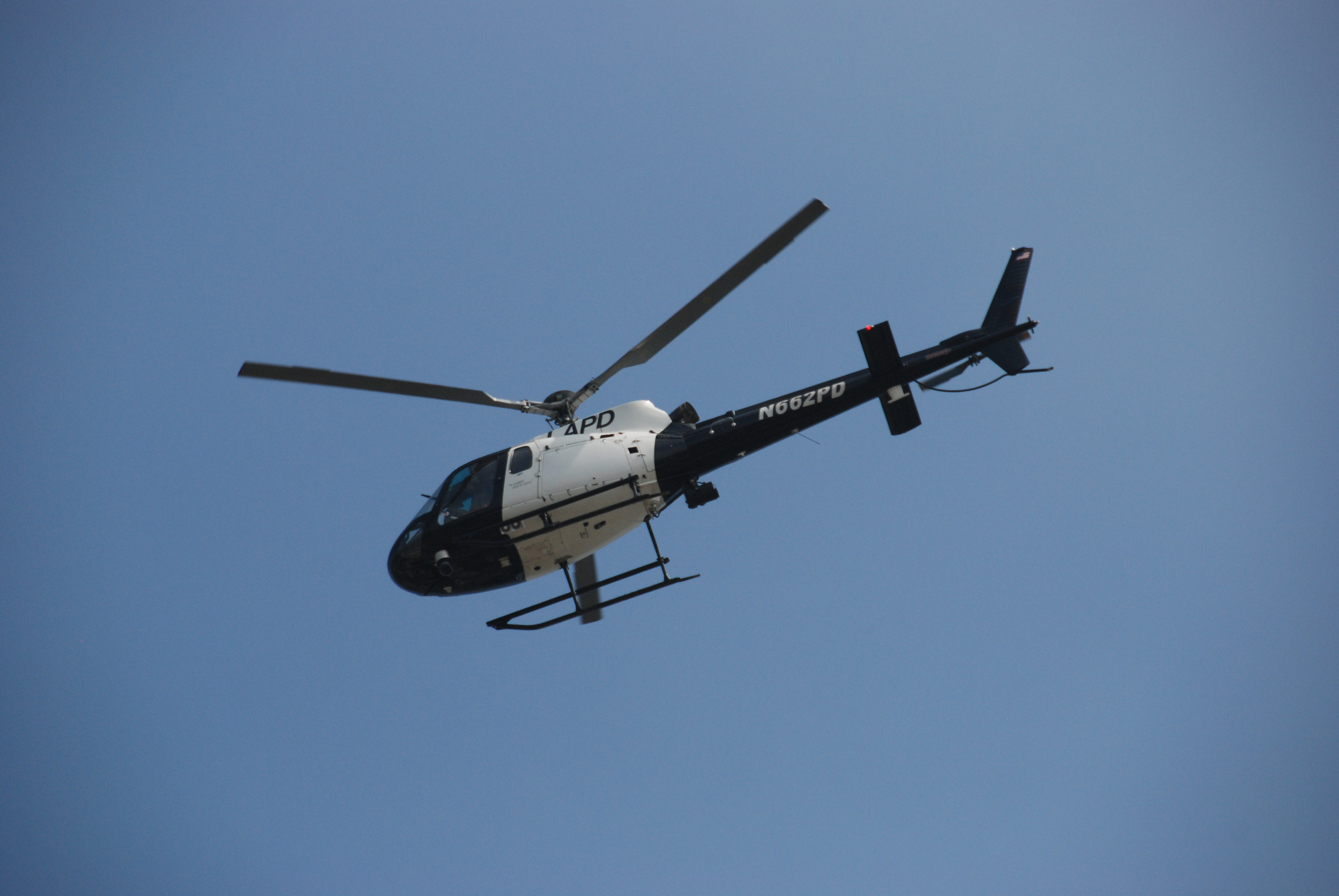
An LAPD Eurocopter AS350

One of the largest municipal police air forces in the world, the LAPD Air Support Division maintains 21 helicopters and 1 fixed-wing aircraft. Older helicopters were painted silver and blue; newer models use the traditional black-and-white paint schemes, similar to patrol cars. The letters "LAPD" appear on the top side of the aircraft in blue, capital letters. LAPD air units (known as "Airships") use Eurocopter AS350B2 AStars, Bell 206B-IIIs, and the Bell 412. They are equipped with a wide variety of electronics and equipment that include a 30 million candlepower Nightsun spotlight, optical FLIR cameras and electronically stabilized binoculars, a LoJack signal receiver, and police radios. The Air Support Division operates from LAPD Hooper Heliport in downtown Los Angeles, and Van Nuys Airport.

Two officers with at least three years of patrol car service fly in each air unit; they are armed and able to land and make arrests in areas not accessible by other means. Air units provide information with regards to barricaded suspects, suspects fleeing on foot or in a vehicle, violent incidents involving large numbers of individuals, and then some. Air units are automatically requested when initiating a traffic stop on a vehicle or suspect with known wants or warrants that are a felony, to limit the potential for a vehicle pursuit.

Despite not flying during poor or inclement weather (particularly dense fog) due to aviation safety procedures, the ASD averages over 16,000 flight hours per year, or enough to continuous keep 2 assets in the air 22 hours a day.

=== Bicycles ===
Occasionally, police bicycle units patrol, usually in large numbers and especially during special events to provide fast and easy access to police assistance. Bicycle units may go on patrols lasting between 10 and 25 miles during any given beat. Bicycle units train rigorously in the hills of Elysian Park near Academy Road and Dodger Stadium. The bicycles used by the Los Angeles Police Department are manufactured by Giant.

=== Horses ===
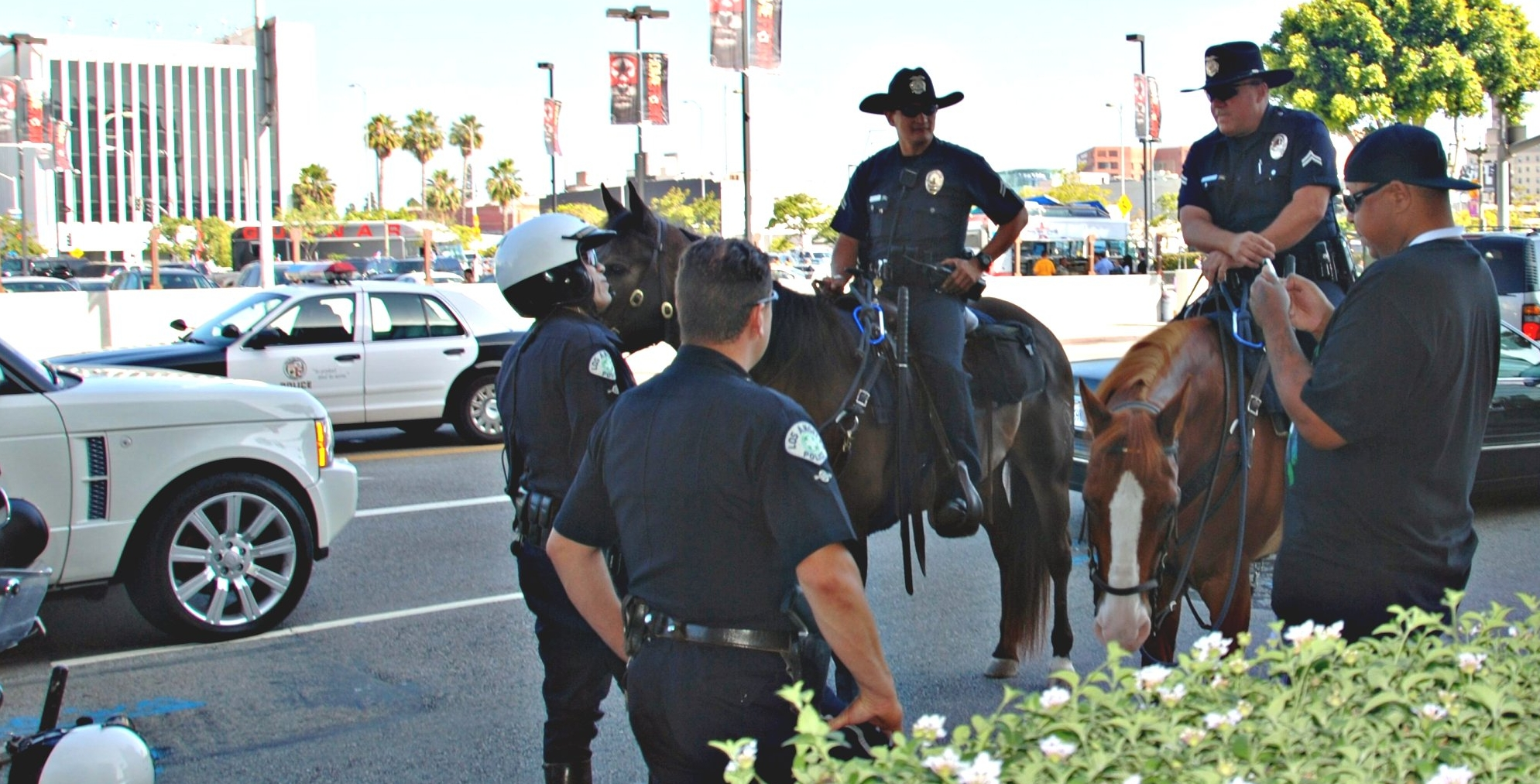
LAPD mounted officers patrol LA streets during a Lakers game.

Metropolitan Division also has a Mounted Unit that consists of approximately 40 police horses. These are normally used for riots and special events. Specially trained officers also wear their uniform along with boots and a Stetson hat with the same police shield as the one worn on the brim of the traditional police hat. Equestrian units normally appear in the city only on special occasions to serve as crowd management. Metro Division is also responsible for the K-9 units (which also wear ballistic vests). Narcotics and Bomb K-9 units belong to different divisions.

== Department organization ==
The department is made up of a variety of organizational units depending on the unit's tasks, size, specialization and area of operations. Inside the LAPD, there are 4 offices, 10 bureaus, 21 community police stations and countless groups, sections, units and details.

Organizational units

- Department: Refers to the Los Angeles Police Department itself in its entirety as established by LA City Charter; Section 500(a)
- Office: Offices serve as the principal organizational entity of the department, commanded by an Assistant Chief, responsible for the management of multiple bureaus and oversight of major operative and administrative functions.
  - Office of the Chief of Police
  - Office of Operations
  - Office of Special Operations
  - Office of Support Services
  - Office of Constitutional Policing & Policy
- Bureau: A major subdivision of the department within an Office, organized either by function or geography − e.g.: Operations-Central Bureau, Professional Standards Bureau, etc.
- Group: Groups are a functional organizational unit within a bureau, typically consisting of two or more divisions/sections that share related duties or objectives − e.g.: Traffic Group, Detective Services Group
- Area: A geographic subdivision of an operations bureau, used internally within the department to organize and deliver policing services within a geographical boundary
- Community Police Station: A geographical command within a geographical bureau, responsible for providing direct policing services to the community.
- Division: A geographical or functional component of a bureau, group, Area, or the Office of the Chief of Police focused on a specific operational or administrative domain.
- Section: A major activity or functional segment of a division, bureau, group, Area, or the Office of the Chief of Police focused on a defined function or set of objectives.
- Unit: A specific activity within a section, division or Area, often assigned to a team focused on a defined function or set of objectives.
- Detail: A particular assignment or duty, often temporarily or narrowly defined, undertaken by personnel as part of a broader unit or section activities.

Offices

Defined above, offices serve as the principal organizational entity of the department, commanded by an Assistant Chief, responsible for the management of multiple bureaus and oversight of major operative administrative functions.

*Office of Operations: The main function of this Office is to provide basic policing services to the community. Each Area Division has a Patrol and Detective Division and may also have specialized vice, narcotics and special enforcement units. 18 of the 21 divisions also feature Area Gang Enforcement Details (GED). The Office of Operations is made up of the following:

- Operations-Central Bureau
  - Central (1) Area Division
  - Rampart (2) Area Division
  - Hollenbeck (4) Area Division
  - Northeast (11) Area Division
  - Newton (13) Area Division
- Operations-West Bureau
  - Wilshire (7) Area Division
  - Hollywood (6) Area Division
  - West LA (8) Area Division
  - Olympic (20) Area Division
  - Pacific (14) Area Division
  - LAX Field Services Division
- Operations-Valley Bureau
  - Van Nuys (9) Area Division
  - Mission (19) Area Division
  - North Hollywood (15) Area Division
  - Foothill (16) Area Division
  - Devonshire (17) Area Division
  - West Valley (10) Area Division
  - Topanga (21) Area Division
- Operations-South Bureau
  - 77th (12) Area Division
  - Southwest (3) Area Division
  - Harbor (5) Area Division
  - Southeast (18) Area Division
  - South Bureau Homicide Division

Office of Special Operations: The office of special operations oversees specialized tactical, investigative and counter-terrorism operations. It is made up of the following:

- Counter-Terrorism and Special Operations Bureau
  - Major Crimes Division
  - Emergency Services Division
  - Metropolitan Division
  - Air Support Division
  - Security Services Division
- Transit Services Bureau
  - Transit Services Group
    - Transit Services Division
  - Traffic Group
    - Central Traffic Division
    - South Traffic Division
    - West Traffic Division
    - Valley Traffic Division
- Detective Bureau
  - Detective Services Group
    - Robbery-Homicide Division
    - Juvenile Division
    - Gang and Narcotics Division
    - Commercial Crimes Division
    - Detective Support & Vice Division
    - Forensic Science Division
    - Technical Investigation Division

Office of Support Services: The Office of Support Services oversees the Department's administrative, personnel, training and logistical functions including communications, records, recruitment, fiscal operations. It is made up of:

- Behavioral Science Services
- Critical Incident Review Division
- Training Bureau
  - Employee Assistance Unit
  - Officer Representation Unit
  - Police Training & Education Division
  - Training Division
  - Recruitment & Employment Division
- Administrative Services Bureau
- Fiscal Group
- Support Services Group
  - Communications Division
  - Custody Services Division
  - Motor Transport Division
  - Records & Identification Division
  - Evidence & Property Management Division
  - Facilities Management Division
  - Personnel Division

Office of the Chief of Police: The Office of the Chief of Police provides executive leadership, policy direction and oversight of the entire Department including, legal affairs, internal affairs and public communication. It is made up of:

- Chief of Staff
  - Public Relations Group
    - Media Relations Division
- Employee Relations Group
- Community Safety Partnership Bureau

Office of Constitutional Policing & Policy: The Office of Constitutional Policing and Policy oversees compliance with constitutional standards, develops departmental policies, manages audits and guides reform initiatives to ensure lawful, ethical and community-oriented policing. It is made up of:

- Audit Division
- Diversity, Equity & Inclusion Group
  - Diversity, Equity & Inclusion Division
- Risk Management & Legal Affairs Division
- Strategic Planning Section

== Radio communications ==
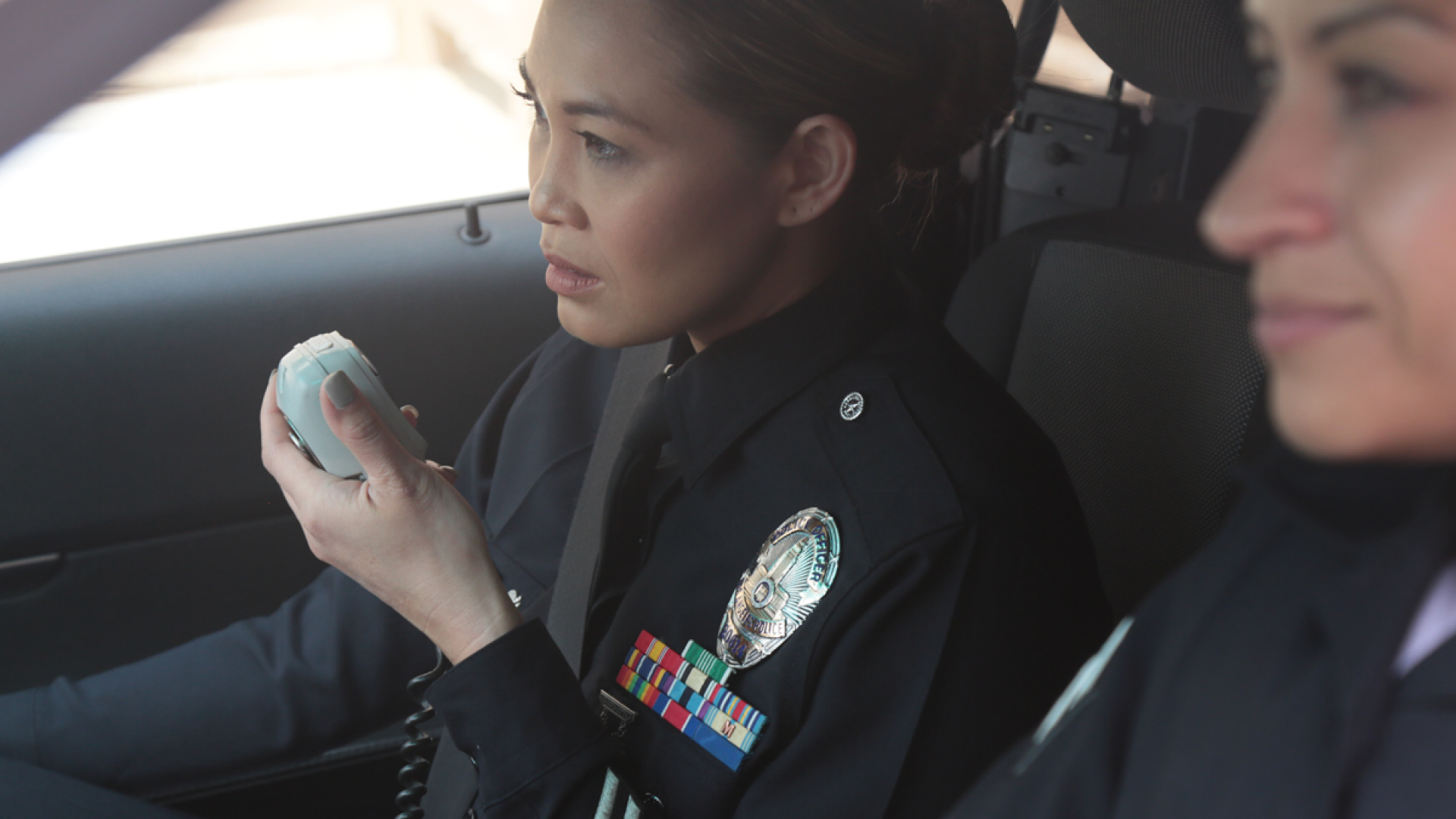
An LAPD officer speaking on her cruiser's radio

Inspired by a contest in 1924, Police Chief R. Lee Heath ordered his staff to investigate the use of radio communications to "more quickly dispatch officers to where they are needed." It was not until Police Chief Roy E. Steckel, however, that the department was assigned its first Federal Communications Commission license. On May 1, 1931, KGPL, the LAPD's dedicated radio callsign, began broadcasting at 1712 kHz, just above the commercial radio broadcasting frequencies; this was later changed to 1730 kHz. Any citizen could monitor outgoing police radio traffic on their home sets. The system was "one way" until the mid-1930s when mobile transmitters were installed in patrol units. In 1949, the FCC changed KGPL's callsign to KMA367. This was later changed again at an unspecified point in time; the LAPD's current primary radio callsign is KJC625. Other frequencies are also used for varying divisions and purposes, such as WPLQ343 for talkaround (direct unit-to-unit communications), WPRJ338 for detectives, and WIL868 for tactical operations. KMA367 is still used by a handful of LAPD divisions, but it is no longer the primary radio callsign for a majority of the department.

Emergency calls for police service are handled by the Communications Division. First, an Emergency Board Operator answers calls placed to 911 (with a lower number of operators assigned to the non-emergency 1-877-ASK-LAPD). A call for service is assigned an incident number, which resets to the number 1—citywide—at midnight each night. Upon receiving the call for service, the Radio Telephone Operator (RTO) will go on the air to broadcast to the division (with the option to simulcast on bureau-wide, geographically adjacent or citywide frequencies).

RTOs provide the following information in what is known as a crime broadcast:

- A set of beep tones based on call priority (none for low priority, three for priority, four for major priority),
- to whom this message is intended (a particular unit, a certain division's units, nearby units, any available units, or all units receiving the transmission),
- the type of incident that just occurred (usually per the California Penal Code, but sometimes an abbreviation established by the Communications Division),
- how long ago the incident occurred,
- the location or address of the incident,
- the number of suspects (if more than one),
- a description of the suspect or suspects, their clothing and/or other uniquely identifiable attributes if available, any weapons they may have,
- a description of the suspect vehicle or vehicle(s), including type, make, model, color, and license plate number (if suspect is using a vehicle, and if such information is available),
- additional details, such as information about the "PR" (person reporting) or simply an order to "monitor comments for additional" (a direction to responding officers to read about the incident on their mobile data terminals (MDTs)),
- a response code (Code 3 for emergency lights and sirens and Code 2 for no lights and no sirens)
- a request for the responding units to identify themselves with their callsigns, and
- the incident number and the "RD" or reporting district (a numbered area within the division).

A fictitious example of an LAPD dispatch radio transmission would be:

Any available Central unit, a 211 just occurred at 714 South Broadway Street. Suspect is a male, white, six-foot seven, approximately 280 pounds; shaved head, black eyes, white shirt, blue jeans. Vehicle is a dark grey late-model Chevrolet Malibu. Weapon used was a semi-automatic handgun. Monitor comments for additional. Units to handle Code 3, identify. Incident number 171 in RD 193.

Without using jargon, this radio transmission is directed to any currently available Central Division unit and reports an armed robbery at 714 South Broadway Street, followed by the suspect's physical description, vehicle description, and weapon, an order to read information in the MDT, and a request for the responding units to identify themselves using their callsign and respond to the scene with emergency lights and sirens, ending with the call's daily incident number, the 171st call of the day. Additionally, it includes a Reporting District for Central Division's Beat 93. The Central Division is numbered "1", meaning an RD of 193.

=== Radio codes ===
- Code 1: Answer radio
- Code 2: Respond to the call without emergency lights and sirens
- Code 3: Respond to the call with lights and sirens
- Code 4: No further units needed to respond, return to patrol
  - Code 4-Adam: No further units needed to respond, suspect not in custody, units already en route to the scene position or patrol in strategic areas near the scene
- Code 5: Stakeout, marked police cars must avoid location
  - Code 5-Edward: Notify Air Support Division personnel of an explosive hazard to low-altitude aircraft
- Code 6: Unit conducting field investigation, no assistance required.
  - Code 6-Adam: Unit conducting field investigation, may need assistance while conducting an investigation
  - Code 6-Charles: Dangerous suspect (usually felony want or warrant reported); units stand-by for assistance
  - Code 6-George: Unit may need assistance in conducting an investigation concerning possible gang activity, an available Gang Enforcement Detail unit shall respond.
  - Code 6-Mary: Unit may need assistance in conducting an investigation concerning possible militant activity, units in vicinity shall direct patrol to location.
- Code 7: Meal break request
- Code 8: Fire reported in area of high fire hazard or threat to firefighting personnel
  - Code 8-Adam: Units requested to scene of fire for traffic and crowd control
- Code 10: Request to clear frequency for broadcast of wanted/warrant information
- Code 12: Request to clear frequency for request for information on potential individual arrest warrant
- Code 20: Notify media (or media already on scene)
- Code 30: Burglar alarm (can be Code 30-Silent)
  - Code 30-Adam: Burglar alarm, location is monitored with audio by security company
  - Code 30-Ringer: Ringing burglar alarm
  - Code 30-Victor: Visual verification burglar alarm
- Code 37: Vehicle is reported stolen (Code 6-Charles is given if vehicle license check produces dangerous suspect or felony want/warrant information)
- Code 100: Notify other units that a possible escape route of a suspect from a crime scene is under temporary surveillance.
- Code Robert-Rifle: Request/notification for deployment of rifle to/at location.
- Code Robert-Slug: Request/notification for deployment of shotgun to/at location.
- Code Sam: Request/notification for deployment of less-than-lethal Bean bag round-equipped shotgun to location
- Code Sam-40: Request/notification for deployment of a 40mm less-than-lethal rubber bullet (grenade) launcher
- Code Tom: Request/notification for deployment of taser to/at location

=== Radio communication terms ===
- AC: Aircraft crash
- FB: Fallen balloon
- QT: Secrecy required regarding location
- TC: Traffic collision
- 211: Robbery
- 311: Indecent exposure
- 390: Drunk male
- 390W: Drunk female
- 415: Disturbance
- 459: Burglary
- 484: Theft
- 484PS: Purse snatching
- 502: Under-the-influence driver
- 507: Minor disturbance
- 507FC: Firecrackers
- 586: Illegal parking
- 586E: Car parked in driveway
- Roger: Message received; will comply
- Come In: You are being called
- Stand By: Wait until a suitable answer is determined-or do not transmit
- Go Ahead: Proceed with your message
- Repeat: Repeat your message
- Out: Out of service; not available for call (used when no other specific code applies and shall be followed by the reason)
- Clear: No calls outstanding against unit; available for call
- Want: Determine whether a vehicle is wanted or is to be held
- No Want: No want or hold on subject or vehicle of inquiry
- Warrant: Vehicle warrant information
- DMV: Information regarding vehicle registration
- Juvenile Check: Determine whether there is want, hold, or criminal record for juvenile subject
- End of Watch: Unit has completed tour of duty

A unit that responds Code 3 must state their starting location (e.g. intersection or street address), after which the RTO broadcasts a Code 3 notification, announcing the unit number is responding Code 3 from that starting location to the location of the distress call.

Typical radio traffic (usually not simulcast citywide) includes the activity generated from traffic stops. A patrol unit may radio control that they are Code 6 on a traffic stop, to which Control will acknowledge. Additional broadcasts will be requests for information on "Cal IDs", or "CalOps" (the numbers that appear at the top of California Department of Motor Vehicles driver licenses) or on vehicle license plates, the result of which provides all of the expected details about the subject plus important details such as whether or not the licensee has any wants or warrants, FTAs (failure to appear in court) or FTPs (failure to pay a fine), etc. In the case of a vehicle, this information can help check whether or not it is Code 37. Off the air and via MDT, officers can check to whom the vehicle is registered.

In the event a Code 6-Charles is broadcast, the unit in question must verify their location, advise if they are Code 4, and the nature of the Code 4 (e.g. suspect in custody, common name, information only or wrong suspect.)

A noticeable characteristic of police broadcasts is the expedited nature of crime broadcasts; due to the number of broadcasts that need to be made at any given moment of the day, each transmission is necessarily as brief as possible. As a standard of police professionalism, RTOs are trained to use a tone that is strictly business-like.

=== Unit callsigns ===
From the perspective of control, each unit is represented by an LAPD-specific callsign. Typically, a callsign is made up of three elements: the division number, the unit type, more specifically the service identification letter and the "beat" number. For example, division 1 is Central Division (or, now, "Central Area"), an "A" is patrol unit with two officers and their patrol area number can be a number like 12. Such a unit would identify themselves as 1A12 (or 1-Adam-12, using the LAPD phonetic alphabet). There are several types of units, designated by a letter:

| Service identification letter | Type |
|---|---|
| A | Basic patrol car (two uniformed officers) |
| Air | Airship |
| B | Community safety partnership unit |
| BRT | Bus riding team |
| C | Bicycle detail |
| CP | Command post |
| CR | Area community relations |
| DV | Domestic abuse response team (DART) unit |
| E | Traffic enforcement automobile unit |
| F | Specialized investigative unit, or crime task force unit |
| FB | Uniformed foot-beat patrol |
| FM | Motor task force |
| FP | Security services division fixed security post |
| G | Bureau gang coordinator, gang unit, area gang impact team, gang enforcement detail |
| HOPE | Homeless outreach proactive engagement uunit |
| J | Juvenile unit |
| K9 | K-9 (canine) division |
| L | Basic patrol car (one uniformed officer) |
| M | Traffic enforcement motorcycle unit |
| MQ | Specialized motorcycle unit |
| MV | Vice task force motorcycle unit |
| MX | Specialized motorcycle unit |
| N | Narcotics unit |
| OP | Observation post assignment during special event or unusual occurrence |
| P | Unit assigned to an operations bureau who may perform administrative or law enforcement duties (e.g. task force units) |
| Q | Special event or unusual occurrence unit |
| R##B | B Platoon, Metropolitan Division |
| R##C | C Platoon, Metropolitan Division |
| R##D | D (SWAT) Platoon, Metropolitan Division |
| R##E | E (Mounted) Platoon, Metropolitan Division |
| R##K9 | K-9 (Canine) Platoon, Metropolitan Division |
| R##H | H (Headquarters) Platoon, Metropolitan Division |
| R##M | Administrative Platoon, Metropolitan Division |
| RP | Security Services Division mobile security patrol |
| S | Senior lead officer (two uniformed officers) |
| SL | Senior lead officer (one uniformed officer) |
| T | Collision investigation unit |
| U | Report-taking unit |
| V | Vice unit |
| VCP | Volunteer citizen patrol engagement units |
| W | Detective unit |
| X | Additional patrol unit in an assignment district |
| Z | Geographic uniformed unit assigned to a special detail, or a career criminal detail |

The immediate supervisor of any patrol officer is called a field supervisor, who typically have beats that end in zero and begin with 2 through 7 (for example, 7-L-60 for a Wilshire Area supervisor). The watch commander is a usually a lieutenant I at a geographic division. Their radio code always ends in "Lincoln-10" (e.g., the watch commander at division 6 or Hollywood Area station is always 6-L-10). The watch commander is responsible for the geographic area (e.g. "Southwest Area") and reports to the area patrol captain I, whose callsign consists of "Commander (Div. Number) A" - therefore, a Southwest Area patrol C/O is "Commander 3A". Callsigns ending in "L90" designate the given division's station desk or base radio console.

Staff Unit Designations

| Designation | Assignment | Rank |
|---|---|---|
| Executive 1 | Mayor | |
| Executive Security 1 | Mayor's security detail | |
| Executive 1A | Deputy mayor | |
| Executive 1B | Executive assistant to the mayor | |
| Executive 2 | City attorney | |
| Executive Security 2 | City attorney's security detail | |
| Commissioner 1 | President, Board of Police Commissioners | |
| Commissioner 2 | Vice President, Board of Police Commissioners | |
| Commissioner 3, 4, 5 | Commissioners, Board of Police Commissioners | |
| Commission Staff 1 | Executive Director, Board of Police Commissioners | |
| Commission Staff 2 | Inspector General, Board of Police Commissioners | |
| Council 1–15 | Council Member, Council District 1–15 | |
| Staff 1 | Chief of Police | |
| Staff 1 Security | Chief's Security Detail | |
| Staff 1A | Chief of Staff | |
| Staff 1B | Commanding Officer, Community Safety Partnership Bureau | Deputy Chief |
| Staff 1C | Assistant Commanding Officer, Community Safety Partnership Bureau | Police Administrator II |
| Staff 1E | Director, Public Communications Group | Public Information Director II |
| Staff 1F | Employee Relations Administrator | Commander |
| Staff 1G | Commanding Officer, Professional Standards Bureau | Deputy Chief |
| Staff 1I | Commanding Officer, Internal Affairs Division | Captain III |
| Staff 1L | Director, Office of Constitutional Policing and Policy | Police Administrator III |
| Staff 1M | Commanding Officer, Risk Management and Legal Affairs Division | Captain II |
| Staff 2 | Director, Office of Operations | Assistant Chief |
| Staff 2A | Assistant to the Director, Office of Operations | Commander |
| Staff 2B | Homeless Coordinator | Commander |
| Staff 3 | Director, Office of Support Services | Assistant Chief |
| Staff 3A | Assistant to the Director, Office of Support Services | ? |
| Staff 3B | Commanding Officer, Administrative Services Bureau | Police Administrator III |
| Staff 3C | Commanding Officer, Support Services Group | Commander |
| Staff 3D | Commanding Officer, Fiscal Group | Police Administrator II |
| Staff 3I | Commanding Officer, Police Training and Education | Director/Doctor |
| Staff 3J | Commanding Officer, Behavioral Science Services | Chief Psychologist/Doctor |
| Staff 3K | Commanding Officer, Training Bureau | Deputy Chief |
| Staff 4B | Commanding Officer, Force Investigation Division | Captain III |
| Staff 8 | Director, Office of Special Operations | Assistant Chief |
| Staff 8A | Assistant to the Director, Office of Special Operations | ? |
| Staff 8B | Commanding Officer, Counter Terrorism and Special Operations Bureau | Deputy Chief |
| Staff 8C | Assistant Commanding Officer, Counter Terrorism and Special Operations Bureau | Commander |
| Staff 8E | Chief of Detectives, Detective Bureau | Deputy Chief |
| Staff 8F | Commanding Officer, Detective Services Group | Commander |
| Staff 8H | Commanding Officer, Information Technology Bureau | Commander |
| Staff 24A | Commanding Officer, Operations-Central Bureau | Deputy Chief |
| Staff 24B | Assistant Commanding Officer, Operations-Central Bureau | Commander |
| Staff 24C | Assistant Commanding Officer, Operations-Central Bureau | Commander |
| Staff 25A | Commanding Officer, Operations-South Bureau | Deputy Chief |
| Staff 25B | Assistant Commanding Officer, Operations-South Bureau | Commander |
| Staff 25C | Assistant Commanding Officer, Operations-South Bureau | Commander |
| Staff 26A | Commanding Officer, Operations-Valley Bureau | Deputy Chief |
| Staff 26B | Assistant Commanding Officer, Operations-Valley Bureau | Commander |
| Staff 26C | Assistant Commanding Officer, Operations-Valley Bureau | Commander |
| Staff 27A | Commanding Officer, Operations-West Bureau | Deputy Chief |
| Staff 27B | Assistant Commanding Officer, Operations-West Bureau | Commander |
| Staff 27C | Assistant Commanding Officer, Operations-West Bureau | Commander |
| Staff 31 | Commanding Officer, Transit Services Bureau | Deputy Chief |
| Staff 31A | Commanding Officer, Transit Services Group | Commander |
| Staff 31B | Commanding Officer, Traffic Group | Commander |

=== Radio equipment ===
Officers out of their cars are able to communicate over the air using portable Motorola radios nicknamed ROVERs ("Remote Out of Vehicle Emergency Radios"). These hand-held radios are currently a mix of the new Motorola APX-8000 and Motorola XTS-5000 models, with some older Motorola Astro digital SABRE models still being used by very few officers and some still inside older police vehicles. ROVERs are normally gun belt-mounted. For convenience, smaller, corded, hand-held speaker-microphones can be plugged into these radios and then clipped to parts of the uniform shirt such as a front pocket or shoulder loop.

Originally, Motorola MX-series analog handheld units were used when the transition from VHF to UHF "T-band" dispatch/tactical frequencies was made in the early 1980s. Prior to that, portable 2-way radios (known in LAPD jargon then as "CC units") were either VHF or UHF, mainly Motorola HT-200s and HT-220s, stocked in small quantities, and used mainly by specialized units such as the Metropolitan Division, SWAT, Special Investigation Section and Narcotics divisions as stakeout tools. Another use was for foot patrol units, mainly in Central Division, in the late 1970s and early 1980s.

=== Digital frequencies ===
After the parade in Los Angeles celebrating the Los Angeles Lakers' 2001 NBA championship title, the LAPD switched from analog frequencies to digital frequencies. This ended a long-lasting era of the public having easy listening access to police broadcasts that started when the department had initially set up agreements with a local, commercial AM radio station to interrupt regularly scheduled programming for a crime broadcast. Officers were tuned to a specific radio station. However, as the amount of broadcasting needed increased, the department established its first transmission tower in Elysian Park and eventually began broadcasting over dozens of frequencies in the 400 MHz and 500 MHz ("T-band") ranges. These digital transmissions can be monitored on a proper Uniden Bearcat or Whistler digital scanner. The LAPD uses a variety of frequencies, grouped depending on usage. The following groups are worth mentioning:

- Dispatch channels: used for dispatch ←→ Car communications of which there are 27
- Fallback channels: used as backups in case of any major technical disruptions, of which there are 25
- Bureau Tacticals: used for car ←→ Car communications as well as the co-ordination of large scale situations inside a given bureau jurisdiction. There are two tacticals for each bureau—additionally, there are seven "citywide tacticals" used for citywide-scale situations

== Rank hierarchy ==
=== Staff officer ranks ===
| Rank | insignia | Notes |
|---|---|---|
| Chief of Police (highest) | | The chief is in charge of the entire department. Appointment is made by the mayor of Los Angeles, with majority approval of the Police Commission.The Chief Should have a college degree and at least 12 years of progressively responsible law enforcement experience. Since 1876, there have been 59 appointed chiefs of the LAPD. William H. Parker was the longest serving police chief in LAPD history, serving for 16 years. |
| Assistant Chief of Police | | Assistant chiefs are usually assigned as directors of one of three offices: Office of Operations, Office of Special Operations and Office of Support Services. The department's senior structure was reorganized again in 2025. Dominic Choi, who served as interim chief during 2024, is now First Assistant Chief and Chief of Staff. |
| Deputy Chief of Police | | Deputy chiefs are usually assigned as commanding officers of area, specialized or support bureaus. |

=== Commanding officer ranks ===
| Rank | Insignia | Notes |
|---|---|---|
| Police Commander | | Commanders are usually assigned as assistant commanding officers of larger bureaus or Commanding Officers of groups or smaller bureaus. |
| Police Captain I–III | | Captain IIIs are assigned as C/Os of an area or specialized divisions, while captain Is are assigned as patrol/detective C/Os within a given Area. Captain IIs can be found as C/Os of specialized divisions. |

=== Supervisory ranks ===
| Rank | Insignia | Notes |
|---|---|---|
| Police Lieutenant I–II | | Lieutenant Is are assigned as Officer-in-Charge of a specialized section or as a Division Watch Commander, while lieutenant IIs are also able to be Assistant C/Os. |
| Police Detective III | | Detective IIIs are assigned as Officer-in-Charge of a specialized section, as a Detective Supervisor or as a Liaison Officer. |
| Police Detective II | | Detective IIs are assigned as Detective Supervisors or as regular detectives inside specialized divisions, such as the Special Investigation Section. |
| Police Sergeant II | | Sergeant IIs are assigned as Assistant Watch Commanders, Chief's Aides, Program Coordinators and a variety of other specialized and administrative assignments. |
| Police Sergeant I | | Sergeant Is can serve as Community Relations Officers, Complaint Investigators, Field Supervisors and a variety of other specialized and administrative assignments |

=== Detective/police officers ranks ===
| Rank | Insignia | Notes |
|---|---|---|
| Police Detective I | | |
| Police Officer III+1 ^{‡} | | Certain Police Officer IIIs in special or hazard pay situations are denoted by a Police Officer III insignia and star. These roles can include traffic follow-up investigators, canine training officers, SWAT platoon element leaders, and Senior Lead Officers who coordinate geographical areas. |
| Police Officer III ^{‡} | | At least four years' service as a Police Officer before becoming eligible for promotion to Sergeant I or Detective I (which requires an additional examination and interview). |
| Police Officer II | No insignia | At least three years' service as a Police Officer before eligibility for promotion to Police Officer III. |
| Police Officer I | No insignia | Automatic promotion to Police Officer II upon satisfactory completion of an 18-month probationary assignment (6 months at the academy plus a 12-month field assessment). |
Insignia are worn as embroidered chevrons on the upper sleeves of a shirt or jacket.

- Specialized unit insignia are worn at the top of the sleeve beneath the shoulder for officers assigned to the traffic divisions. Officers assigned to area patrol divisions have historically not worn any departmental shoulder patch on their uniforms.
- Service stripes are worn above the left cuff on a long-sleeved shirt. Each silver stripe represents five years of service in the LAPD.

=== Supervisory levels ===
The following names are used to describe supervision levels within the LAPD:

| Position | Description |
|---|---|
| Staff Officer | Any rank above commander |
| Commanding Officer | Any officer in charge of a bureau, a group, a geographical area, or a division |
| Assistant Commanding Officer | An officer with the rank of commander at the four geographic Bureaus and Operations-Headquarters Bureau. |
| Director | An officer commanding an office of the LAPD |
| Incident Commander | Any officer who takes command at an emergency situation or who is in command at a planned special event |
| Watch Commander | An officer in charge of a specific watch within a division or geographical area |
| Supervisor | An officer engaged in field supervision or in general supervision of a section or unit |
| Officer in Charge ^{‡} | An officer in charge of a section, incident or unit |

‡ As detectives are considered specialists within the LAPD, they are normally considered to be separate from the uniformed line of command. The senior-most detective is therefore permitted to take charge of an incident when it is necessary for investigative purposes, superseding the chain of command of other higher-ranking officers in attendance.

== Technology and policing systems ==
=== Predictive policing ===
Predictive policing is an approach to policing that uses algorithms to predict when future crimes are most likely to occur. Through artificial intelligence, data is gathered and used to identify suspicious patterns, locations, activity, and individuals. The technology is based on network models and risk models. Network models predict specific types of crime using information based on time and location to predict when and where to look for crimes. The prediction model utilizes geo-spatiality to provide information on crimes. In 2008, then-Chief William Bratton began working with federal agencies to assess the use of a more predictive approach to policing. Though certain cities such as Santa Cruz, Oakland, and New Orleans banned predictive policing over concerns surrounding its disproportional effects on racialized communities, the practice continues in the LAPD.

=== Los Angeles Strategic Extraction and Restoration Program ===
The Los Angeles Strategic Extraction and Restoration Program (LASER) began in 2011 and is a strategy that includes location-based and offender-based models. It began in 2011 and was funded by the Smart Policing Initiative. This program uses a point based system where individuals are assigned a LASER score, which is later used to evaluate their potential risk. This system was created with the intention of targeting individuals who are most likely to commit a crime based on data around crime history. Points are designed based on gang membership, violent crimes committed, and “quality” interaction with the police. Through this system, when individuals scored a high enough LASER score, they were put on a “chronic offenders bulletin” which was available to LAPD officers. After a report in 2018 found that 84% of the 233 people with high enough LASER scores to be labeled a "chronic offender" were Black and Latino, the LAPD shut down LASER.

=== PredPol ===
The LAPD started using PredPol, a predictive policing software, in 2012. PredPol uses an algorithm to analyze data from LAPD record management systems and predict future crimes. It uses the near repeat model, which suggests that once there is a crime in a location, the surrounding area is immediately at increased risk for more crimes. Three aspects of offender behavior are incorporated into the algorithm that is informed by a decade of research on criminal patterns:

- Repeat victimization: if a crime is committed one day, the risk of it happening again goes up. This is based on the understanding that if an offender is successful in one area, they will come back because it is now less risky.
- Near-repeat victimization: if a crime is committed next door, neighboring homes are now at higher risk because of the close proximity.
- Local search: crimes tend to cluster together, because criminals are not likely to travel far from their key activity points such as home, work, and play.

=== Palantir ===
Palantir is a platform where the LAPD uses data to send out reports to officers. The platform works by merging data from crime and arrest reports, automated license plate reader (ALPR), rap sheets and other sources. This platform uses “tagging,” which allows officers to tag people, vehicles, addresses, phone numbers, documents, incidents, citations, calls for service, ALPR, and field interview cards of interest. Through having Palantir on their cell phones, officers are automatically notified of warrants or events that involve the tagged entities.
