= Sandra Figueroa-Villa =

- Born: Los Angeles, California
- Education: California State University at Los Angeles
- Occupation: Non-profit director
- Employer: El Centro del Pueblo
- Board member of: Los Angeles Board of Police Commissioners
- Spouse: Jesus Villa

Sandra Figueroa-Villa is a former member of the Los Angeles Board of Police Commissioners, the five-member appointed body that oversees the Los Angeles Police Department. She has been described as "a key leader in the Latino community" in Los Angeles.

== Biography ==
Figueroa-Villa was born and raised in South Los Angeles and graduated from Roosevelt High School in Boyle Heights and California State University at Los Angeles.

She spent 40 years working in the non-profit sector, including as executive director since 1980 of El Centro del Pueblo, which describes itself as "a non-profit community service agency for the purpose of alleviating and mitigating the negative effects of gang violence."

In 2013, she was appointed by Mayor Eric Garcetti to the Los Angeles Board of Police Commissioners.

In 2017, she voted in favor of a controversial LAPD pilot program to use unarmed drones in a limited capacity during high-risk tactical situations.

Figueroa-Villa is a member of the Cal State LA President's Council.

== Controversy ==
In August 2019, an investigative report published by the Los Angeles Times said that Figueroa-Villa failed to disclose that her nonprofit group received millions of dollars in contracts from the city to work with the police on gang initiatives, as well as a $7,500 donation from PredPol, a technology firm with ties to the LAPD that developed a controversial software program to predict where and when crimes were likely to occur over the next 12 hours.
