= Mazerolle =

Mazerolle is a surname. Notable people with the surname include:

- Alexis-Joseph Mazerolle (1826–1889), French painter
- Lorraine Mazerolle (born 1964), Australian criminologist
