= Car carrier trailer =

Automobile which hauls other automobiles

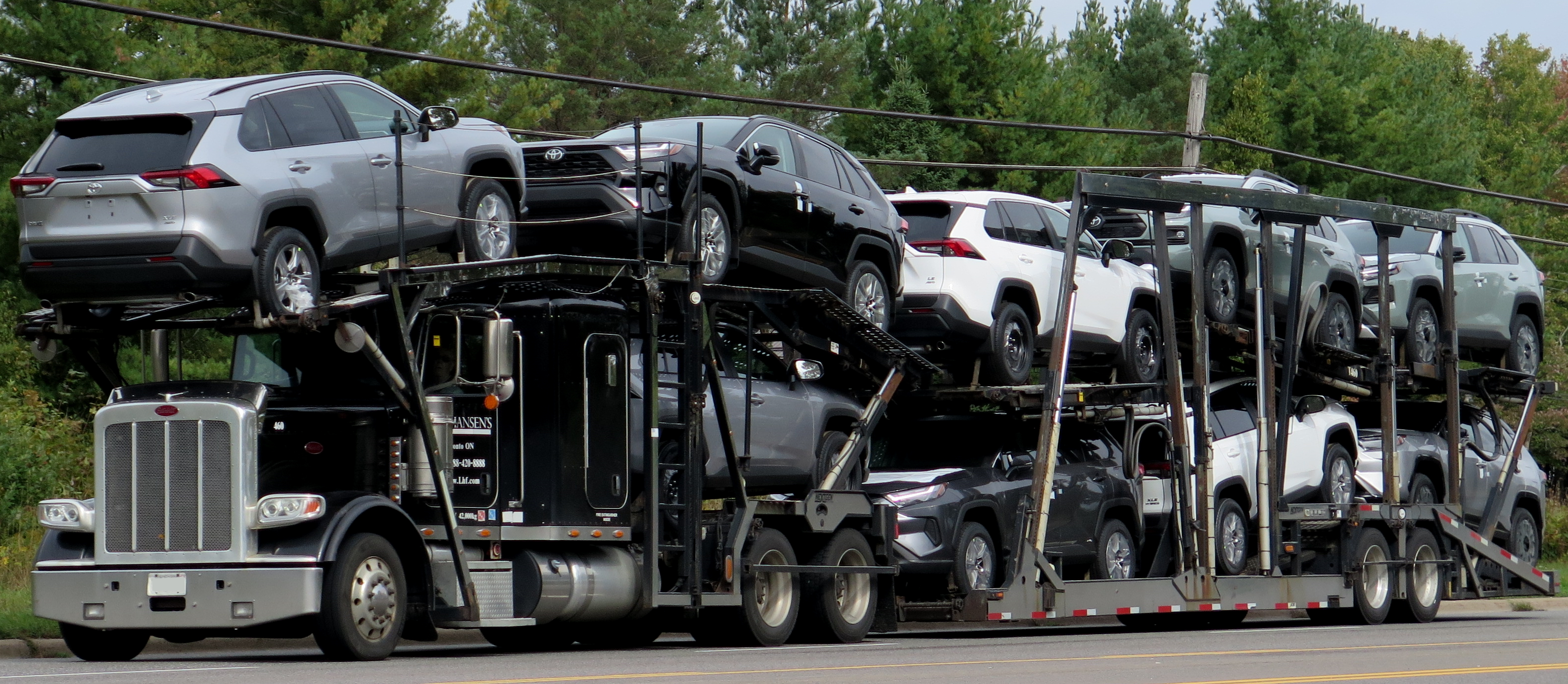
2015 Peterbilt 388 with car hauler trailer

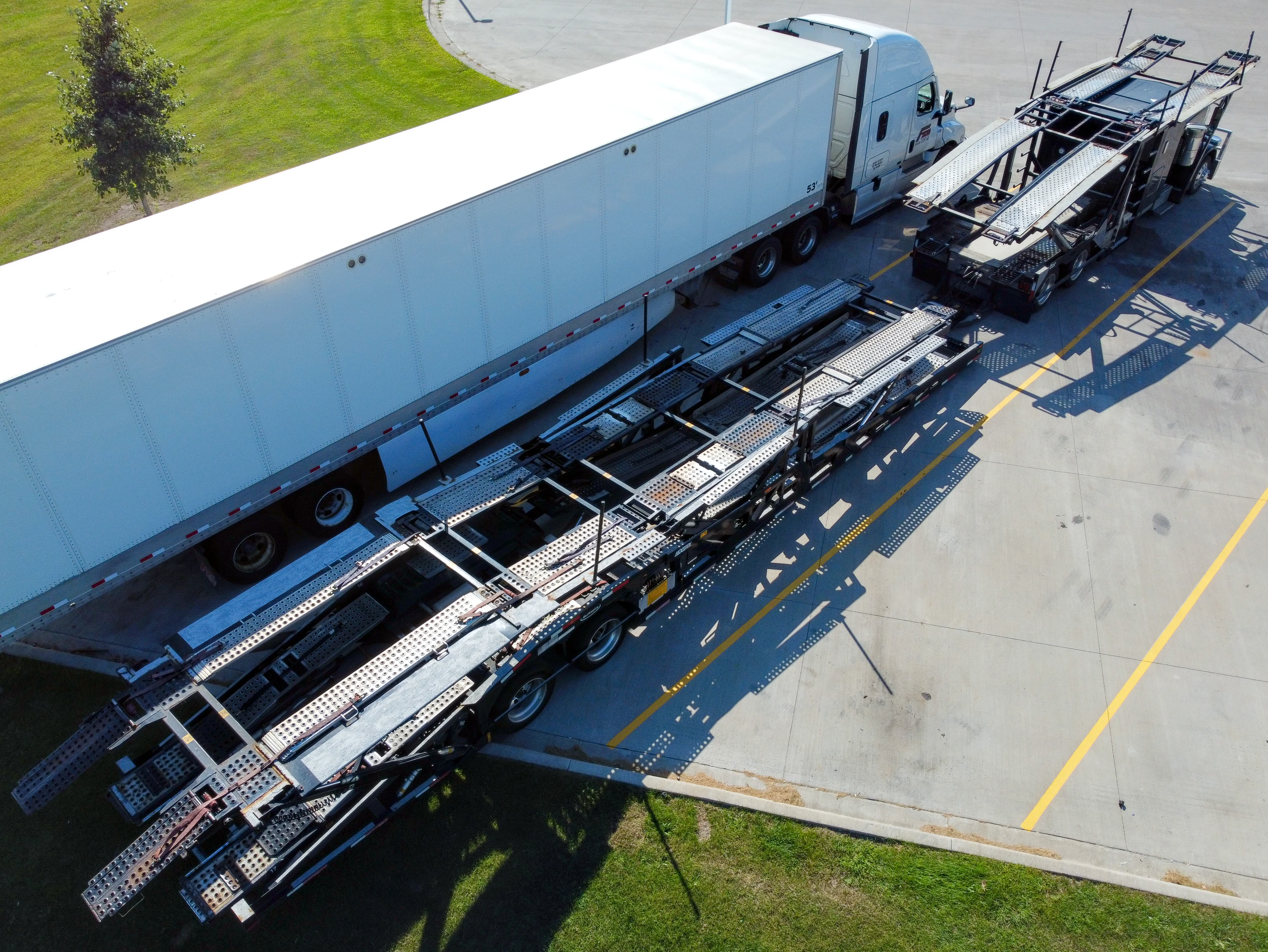
An empty car carrier trailer

A car carrier trailer, also known as a car-carrying trailer, car hauler, auto transport trailer or car transporter, is a type of trailer or semi-trailer designed to efficiently transport passenger vehicles via truck.

Modern car carrier trailers can be open or enclosed. Most commercial trailers have built-in ramps for loading and off-loading cars, as well as power hydraulics to raise and lower ramps for stand-alone accessibility.

== Commercial car carrier trailers ==
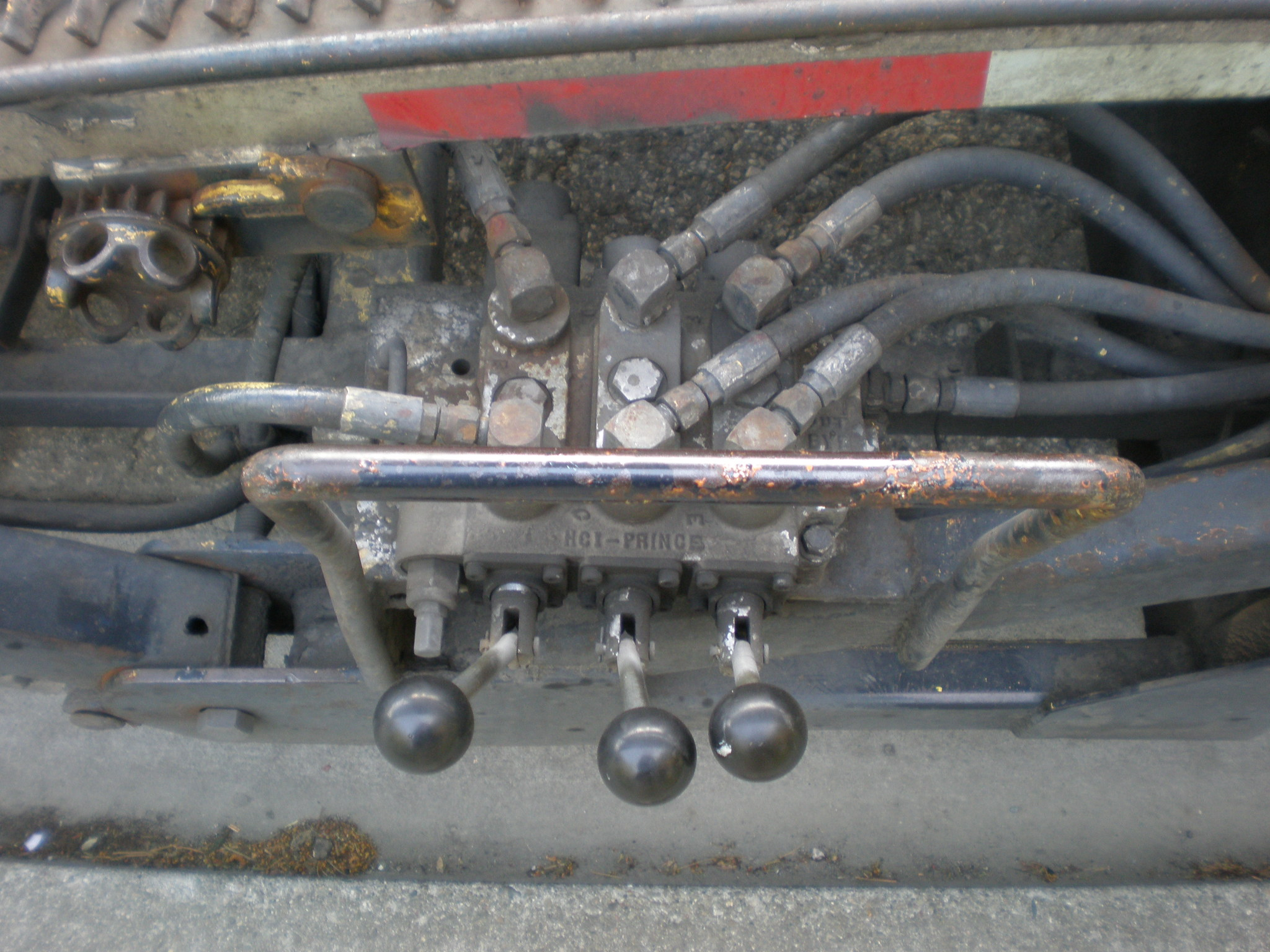
Some of the hydraulic ramp controls on a car carrier trailer.

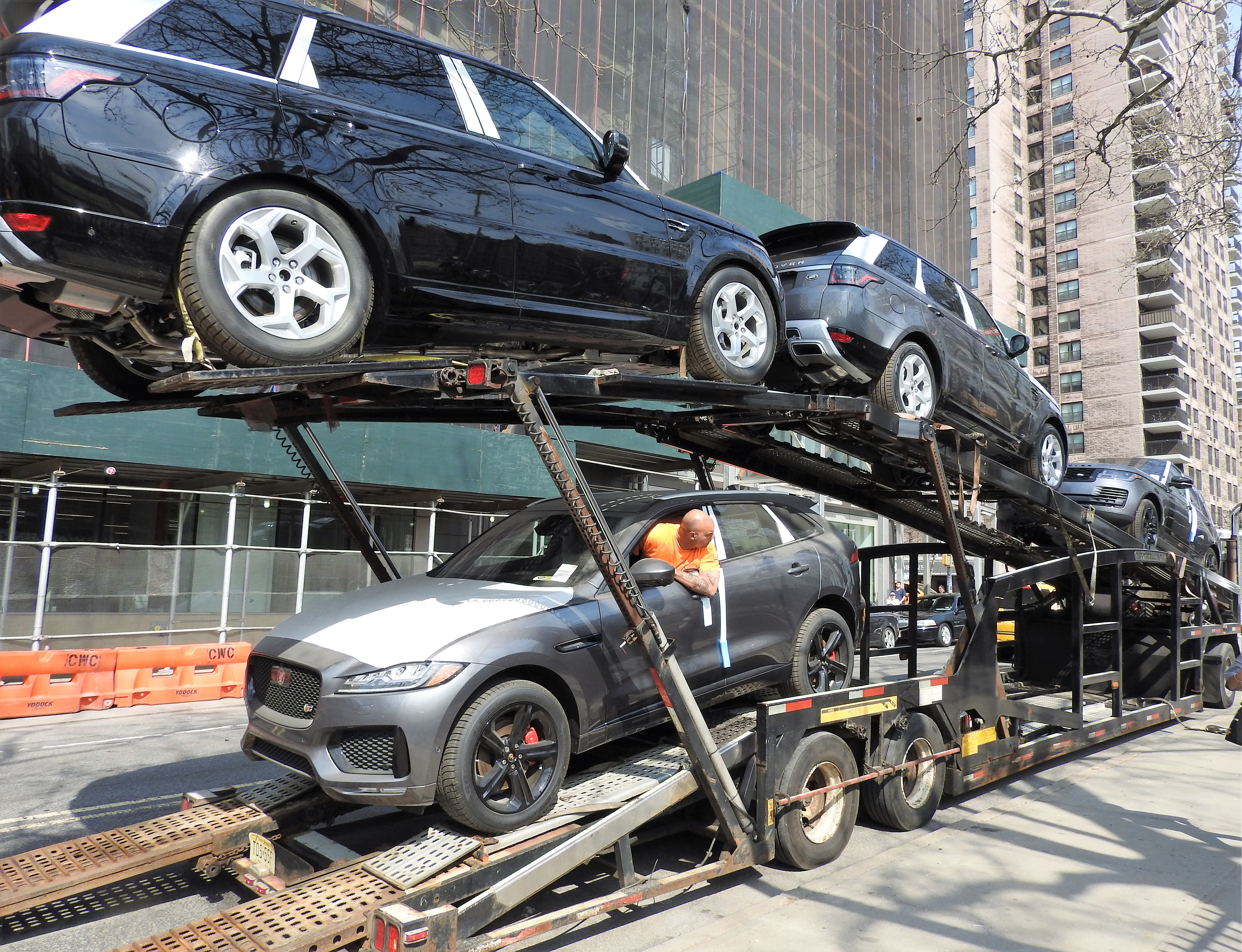
Loading a trailer

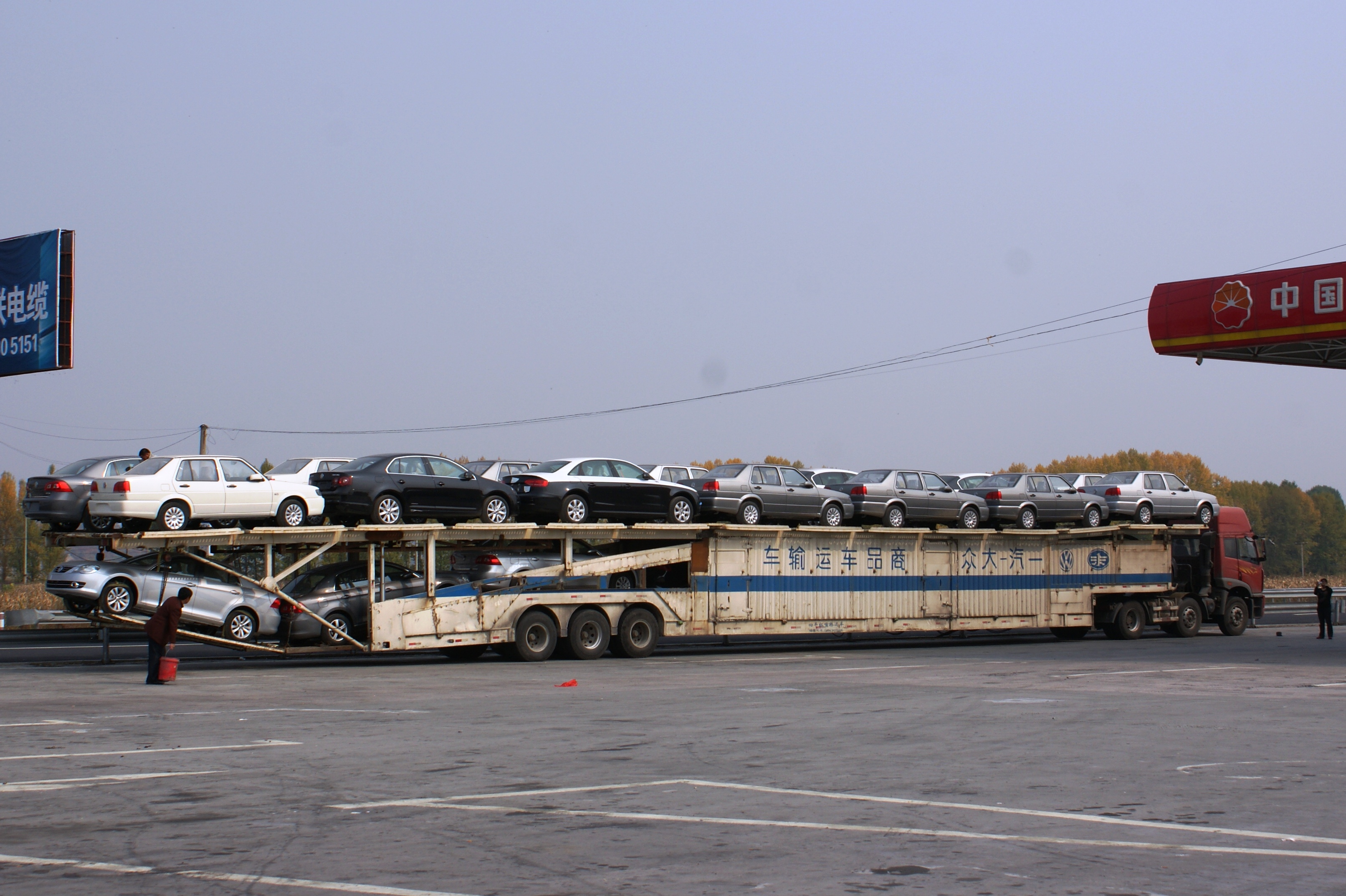
Chinese car transporter. Notice the long length and the double-parked upper deck of cars.

Commercial-size car carrying trailers are commonly used to ship new cars from the manufacturer to auto dealerships. In the United States, shipping of used vehicles is also a big industry, employed by car owners who are relocating and choose to ship their cars instead of driving, as well as consumers who have just purchased a vehicle on the second-hand market (particularly online) and need it delivered to their location.

Like other semi-trailers, most commercial car carrier trailers attach to the tractor using a fifth wheel coupling. Trailers can either be enclosed, possessing walls like a conventional box trailer, which affords the shipped vehicles more protection at the cost of lower capacity; or open, as in the commonly seen skeletal tube steel design, which exposes the vehicles to the elements but allows for greater carrying capacity. An American commercial car carrier typically fits between 5 and 9 cars, depending on the car size and trailer model (capacity is limited by an 80,000 lb weight cap that a road vehicle is subject to under U.S. law.). Significantly higher-capacity vehicles have been observed around the world, such as a side-by-side loading Chinese model.

Open commercial car carrier trailers typically have a double-decker design, with both decks subdivided into a number of loading and storage ramps that can be tilted and lifted independently of one another with hydraulics. Unlike flatbed tow trucks, which often need to transport non-running vehicles, car carrier trailers are not equipped with loaders or winches, instead, relying on the vehicles to be loaded under their own power. The trailer hydraulics allow the ramps to be aligned on a slope, so cars can be driven up and secured to the ramp floor with chains, tie-down ratchets, or wheel straps, after which the ramp can be tilted in any direction to optimize stacking.

To load vehicles on the top deck of a double-decker commercial trailer, the rear half of the deck can tilt and be lowered hydraulically, forming a drive-up ramp to the upper deck. The top deck is usually loaded first and off-loaded last since the presence of cars on the lower deck can make it impossible to lower the top deck ramp.

Trailer hydraulics are operated using a control box mounted on the trailer itself.

== Other equipment ==
In order to further expand storage capacity, some trucks, typically called stinger units, are equipped with an "overhead" — an extra storage space mounted above the truck cabin which is accessible via the top ramp of a car carrier trailer. Up to 3 vehicles can be loaded on the truck: one on the roof, and two over the 5th wheel/drive tires.

== See also ==
- Trailer
- Semi-trailer
- Autorack
- Roll-on/roll-off ship
- Roll trailer
