= Fridell =

Fridell is a surname. Notable people with the surname include:

- Ake Fridell (1919–1985), Swedish film actor
- Daniel Fridell (born 1967), Swedish film director and producer
- Folke Fridell (1904–1985), Swedish writer
- Squire Fridell (born 1943), American retired actor, author, and winemaker
- Lorie Fridell, American criminologist
- Vivian Fridell (1912/1943 - 1998), American actress
