= SoundThinking =

American gunfire locator technology company

SoundThinking, Inc.
- Former logo
- Formerly: ShotSpotter Inc.
- Type: Public
- Traded as: Nasdaq: SSTI
- Industry: Security technology
- Founded: 1996; 30 years ago
- Founder: Robert Showen
- Headquarters: Fremont, California, U.S.
- Areas served: United States
- Key people: Ralph Clark (president & CEO); Pascal Levensohn (chairman)
- Revenue: ▲US$92.72 million (2023)
- Operating income: ▼US$−1.24 million (2023)
- Net income: ▼US$−2.72 million (2023)
- Total assets: ▲US$138.7 million (2023)
- Total equity: ▲US$74.76 million (2023)
- Number of employees: 312 (December 2023)
- Website: soundthinking.com

SoundThinking, Inc. (formerly ShotSpotter Inc.) is an American security technology company based in Fremont, California. The company is publicly traded, and is known for its gunfire locator service. ShotSpotter claims it can identify when a gunshot is fired in an area in order to dispatch law enforcement, though researchers have noted concerns about effectiveness, reliability, privacy, and equity. The company has been partnering with cities and police since 1997, and as of 2022 has been utilized by more than 130 cities and law enforcement agencies in the US.

== History ==
ShotSpotter was founded by Robert Showen in the 1990s while he was working for SRI International. He created a company in 1996 and tested prototypes in Redwood City, California. Its early success was described by Wired as being "due to good PR, not good technology." James Beldock joined as CEO in 2003 as a "turnaround specialist"; in 2005 the company merged with Centurist Systems, which was creating acoustic sniper location systems for the military; Centurist held a "deceptively simple patent" for the location algorithm. Centurist's CEO, Scott Manderville, became chairman of the board.

As of 2021, the acoustic locator technology was installed in 125 cities and 14 campuses, covering 911 square miles. The locators are typically installed at 20–25 sensors per square mile and primarily connected via 4G networks (mostly AT&T and Verizon). In 2020, Chicago was 18% of the company's revenue, and New York City was 15%.

Ralph Clark was named CEO of ShotSpotter in 2010. The company went public in June 2017. The company authorized a stock buyback program in 2019 and bought back $8.3 million by the end of 2020.

The company's gross revenues were $58.2 million in 2021 (increased coverage by 49 square miles and 10 cities), up from $45.7 million in 2020 and from $40.8 million in 2019 (increased coverage by 82 square miles and 6 cities). The company had a net loss of $4.4 million in 2021, in part from nonrenewal of contracts and increases in legal costs, PR from Trident DMG, and lobbying.

Toronto, Ontario has declined to use the technology, as the Ministry of the Solicitor General (Ontario) believes it violates Section 8 of the Canadian Charter of Rights and Freedoms. The company previously provided indoor gunfire locator technology, but discontinued it in 2018. ShotSpotter illegally lobbied the city of Oakland, California in 2014 and received a $5000 fine.

In April 2023, the company rebranded to SoundThinking to better represent "holistic approach to gun violence", but retained the ShotSpotter product name.

In an August 2023 earnings call, the CEO of SoundThinking announced that the company had begun the process of absorbing parts (including the "engineering team") of Geolitica, formerly known as PredPol. The company spent nearly $24 million in sales and marketing in 2023.

=== Studies ===
A June 2021 study in the Journal of Experimental Criminology stated the system "may be of little benefit to police agencies with a pre-existing high call volume. Our results indicate no reductions in serious violent crimes, yet [ShotSpotter] increases demands on police resources." An October 2021 paper in the Journal of Urban Health, studying the longitudinal effects of ShotSpotter over a 17 year period, found "implementing ShotSpotter technology has no significant impact on firearm-related homicides or arrest outcomes. Policy solutions may represent a more cost-effective measure to reduce urban firearm violence."

In 2021 the NYU School of Law Policing Project published "Measuring the effects of ShotSpotter on Gunfire in St. Louis County, Mo", a paper which indicated a significant drop in gun violence in the area; however, the paper also discloses that ShotSpotter "has provided the Policing Project with unrestricted funding".

In July 2023, a Houston Chronicle investigation showed that ShotSpotter calls resulted in lower incident report rates and longer police response times. Over 80% of ShotSpotter alerts were false positives or otherwise useless. The almost 5500 alerts led to 99 arrests and 126 charges, about half of which were misdemeanors. A disproportionate number of residents in coverage areas are people of color. The Houston Police Department cast the system as a way to invest in historically marginalized areas. In May 2024, Houston mayor John Whitmire said "I think it's a gimmick. A feel-good program. Most law enforcement officers do not support ShotSpotter. I don't support it." The city's contract goes through 2027, but Whitmire wants to terminate it early.

A 2024 Northeastern University study showed that ShotSpotter increased detection of gunfire, but did not result in a reduction of gun violence or an increase in gunshot crime case clearance. Ohio State University criminal justice professor Terrance Hinton described it as "more of a Band-Aid... it doesn't address the root cause of gun violence".

Jennifer Doleac told Voice of San Diego that ShotSpotter "resisted attempts (by me and others) to do a rigorous evaluation of its impacts", noting "they've clearly found that they can get cities to sign their contracts without such evidence."

A 2024 audit from the New York City Comptroller found that during the month of June 2023 New York City Police Department responded to 940 alerts, 82% could not confirm a shot was fired, and 5% were unfounded or a false positive. It also stated that NYPD was over-representing the benefits of the system in reducing response times. Comptroller Brad Lander said "NYPD is wasting precious time and money on this technology and needs to do a better job managing its resources. Chasing down car backfires and construction noise does not make us safer." Activist and early supporter of the ShotSpotter installation Jumaane Williams agreed it wasn't working, stating "More concerning is a response to the report. Even the recommendations that say, 'let's try to make it better,' the most material of the recommendations were outright rejected by this administration."

=== Opposition ===
In May 2024, three senators and a representative wrote a letter requesting the Department of Homeland Security Office of Inspector General open an investigation into ShotSpotter for its accuracy and racial bias in policing.

Campaign Zero has a project called #CancelShotSpotter that addresses claims made by the company versus studies. In 2025 the campaign put mobile billboards in Little Rock, Arkansas to oppose renewing a ShotSpotter contract stating "ShotSpotter admits it doesn't prevent crime. What are your tax dollars paying for?" and "ShotSpotter cannot tell the difference between a popped balloon, fireworks or gunshots." It has also placed advertisements in Fayetteville, North Carolina in 2024.

== Design ==
ShotSpotter's gunshot detection system utilizes a series of sensors to capture loud, impulsive sounds. When such sounds are identified, sensors send data to a pair of algorithms responsible for identifying a location and determining if the event can be classified as potential gunfire. Employees at the company are charged with confirming incidents and notifying local police.

Although it is designed to be just an investigative tool for the police, it has also been used for actual primary evidence in trials, leading to criticism about ShotSpotter's effectiveness beyond its primary purpose.

== Accuracy ==
As of 2021, ShotSpotter evidence has been used in 190 court cases, though it is often withdrawn when challenged. ShotSpotter has admitted it manually alters the computer-calculated evidence "on a semiregular basis", and it has never been independently tested, leading to doubts about its accuracy. Vice's Motherboard noted that ShotSpotter "frequently modify alerts at the request of police departments." Associated Press also noted their "methods for identifying gunshots aren't always guided solely by the technology."

While the company claims a 97% accuracy rate, the MacArthur Justice Center studied over 40,000 dispatches in an under-two-year period in Chicago and found that 89% of dispatches resulted in no gun-related crime, and 86% resulted in no crime at all. These results were backed up by a subsequent report by the Chicago Inspector General, which also found that police officers had begun stopping and searching people solely because they were in a place known to have many ShotSpotter alerts. ShotSpotter's CEO described an earlier 80% accuracy rate as "basically our subscription warranty", but employee Paul Greene said "Our guarantee was put together by our sales and marketing department, not our engineers." A multipart investigation published in 2024 by South Side Weekly found that ShotSpotter missed hundreds of shootings in Chicago the previous year; leaked company emails revealed executives discussing the fact that they had nonworking sensors and not enough personnel to quickly repair them, but could not admit that to city officials.

A study published in January 2024 showed that ShotSpotter implementations in Chicago and Kansas City did not result in reductions in shootings or crime or increased clearance rates.

The ACLU has raised questions about privacy and surveillance, as the detectors keep hours or days of continuous audio. This audio has been admitted as evidence in at least one trial and rejected under a Massachusetts wiretapping law in a 2017 case. When Forbes sent public records requests to agencies in 2016, ShotSpotter sent a memo to all of its customers, detailing how they should deny or redact the requests. ACLU of Massachusetts noted evidence of gunfire is not found for 70% of alerts, and at least 10% of alerts are from fireworks.

The Associated Press reviewed a confidential operations document that indicated 10% of the algorithm's decisions were overridden by a human. Additionally, the sensors are disproportionately placed in minority communities, leading to more interactions with police, often from false alerts from fireworks, pneumatic nail guns, helicopter rotors, jackhammers, and manual hammers. In cities with cancelled contracts, ShotSpotter still provides alerts to police.

=== Individual cases ===
In April 2017, ShotSpotter was able to locate mass-shooter Kori Ali Muhammad, enabling police to apprehend him within minutes.

In 2017, Rochester Police Department officer Joseph Ferrigno shot Silvon Simmons in the back. Accounts between Ferrigno and Simmons vary, but ShotSpotter initially detected the gunshots as a helicopter. The company reclassified it as three gunshots "per the customer's instruction", then revised it to four shots. Later the company's employee Paul Greene "was asked by the Rochester Police department to essentially search and see if there were more shots fired than ShotSpotter picked up", so it was revised to five gunshots, which put it in alignment with Ferrigno's claims. The jury didn't believe ShotSpotter's evidence, and Judge Ciaccio overturned a gun possession charge, describing the ShotSpotter evidence as flawed. Simmons filed a civil lawsuit against ShotSpotter in 2017. April 2024 Judge Frank P. Geraci Jr. dismissed the counts against ShotSpotter, and the jury decided that the officers did not act improperly.

Greene also testified in a 2018 case in Chicago where ShotSpotter initially reported two gunshots. On request of the Chicago Police Department, he re-analyzed and found seven gunshots. This matched the police department's account and was not supported by video or bullet casing evidence.

Another case of reclassification occurred in 2020 with the arrest of a Chicago man for the shooting murder of Safarain Herring. ShotSpotter initially classified the sound as a firework, but a ShotSpotter employee changed it to gunfire a minute later, and later changed the calculated location to match the defendant's known location — over a mile away. A public defender in the case filed a Frye motion to examine the ShotSpotter forensic method, and the prosecution withdrew the evidence to avoid scrutinizing it. The MacArthur Center along with Lucy Parsons Labs filed an amicus curiae in the case, supporting the Frye hearing, noting the false positives, the disproportionate deployment, and that "ShotSpotter provides a false technological justification for overpolicing." The defendant spent 11 months in jail before being released in 2021 when his case was dismissed for insufficient evidence.

A ShotSpotter report of shots fired was the impetus for police response which resulted in the March 2021 police shooting death of 13-year-old Adam Toledo by the Chicago Police Department. This is part of the reason Chicago did not continue its Shotspotter contract in 2024. A year after Chicago stopped using ShotSpotter, a study showed an 18% decrease in violent crime and 37% decrease in homicides.

In New Bedford, Massachusetts, the gunshot sensors recorded parts of a conversation, leading to concerns that it violates Fourth Amendment rights. Remarking on these privacy concerns, in 2015 then-NYPD commissioner William Bratton said "the advocates have to get a life." Bratton had been on ShotSpotter's Board of Directors before then, and rejoined it in 2017.

In July 2022, the MacArthur Justice Center brought a class action lawsuit against the City of Chicago, the Chicago Police Department, and several individual police officers for constitutional violations in connection with the use of ShotSpotter. The lawsuit alleges that more than 90% of the time police respond to a ShotSpotter alert they find no indication of a gun-related incident and instead use the alerts to justify scores of illegal stops and arrests. The lawsuit also alleges that Chicago's ShotSpotter policy is racially discriminatory because the system was only implemented in areas with the highest concentration of Black and Latino residents.

Part of ShotSpotter's appeal to privacy is that ostensibly, police do not know the installed locations, which could otherwise allow police to acquire conversations from the ShotSpotter microphones. Bloomberg News reported, however, that not only were location addresses given to the New York Police Department, ShotSpotter actually relied on police to help lobby for their installations, and NYPD stated they have also accompanied ShotSpotter teams on site surveys. In Durham, Shotspotter wanted police officers to lobby for installations for safety and legitimacy. In 2024, WIRED received a leaked listing of precise installation locations for over 25,000 microphones, placing them in the neighborhoods of over 12 million Americans. Their analysis showed the sensors are installed in disproportionally nonwhite neighborhoods, and determined roughly 10% of the sensors were defective. WIRED also noted sensors are installed on public schools, billboards, hospitals, in public housing complexes, and at the headquarters buildings of the FBI and USDOJ. Shortly after this it was revealed that SoundThinking is suing a whistleblower, Chris Edwards, who disclosed locations of ShotSpotter sensors to the public via social media. While it is not known if this is the Wired source it is very similar. Chris Edwards in turn has claimed that ShotSpotter internally "ShotSpotter is attempting to silence exposure of their toxic workplace environment, rampant sexual and mental harassment, as well as poor business processes which include fraudulent practices of manipulating their data to earn contract agreements with government and local agencies" In his motion, Edwards claimed to have witnessed that much of the ShotSpotter system "was broken, decayed and not maintained", and that code violations were prevalent. Suspecting that a compromised system might not be "relaying the correct data" to customers, Edwards claimed he raised these concerns with his bosses. But according to Edwards's legal filing, his bosses wrote those issues off. In his motion, Edwards claimed that John Fountain, ShotSpotter's former director of field and network operations, told him to "falsify numbers on the deteriorated system to avoid" having to pay back money to cities and agencies for not meeting their contractual obligations. He also claimed, in an affidavit attached to his motion, that Fountain told him to "keep these things in-house" and to "stay out of business that has nothing to do with you."

ShotSpotter was activated for a shooting at the house of New Mexico Senator Linda M. Lopez; police were dispatched but did not find evidence. Judge Jeff Beaverstock allowed a ShotSpotter alert to be used as the basis of an arrest in Mobile, Alabama.

Pasadena, California's use of ShotSpotter showed false alerts and wasted police time in a 2023 report. 75% of gunfire calls resulted in no gun casings being found, with some calls being attributed to pneumatic nail guns, fireworks, or cars backfiring. In January 2024, a Chicago Police Department officer responding to a ShotSpotter alert heard a loud bang, fired at a juvenile boy, and missed. An initial police communication stated the boy had fired a gun at officers. After investigation, it was determined the loud noise were fireworks. The juvenile was not hit by the police in the shooting.

== Installations ==
=== Current ===
- East Palo Alto, California (Since 2007)
- Little Rock, Arkansas ($188k yearly contract, started 2018, restarted April 2025)
- Antioch, California (4 sq mi, $1.4 million sole-source five-year contract)
- Bakersfield, California
- Fresno, California (17 sq mi, $2.6 million three-year contract)
- Oakland, California
- Pasadena, California
- Sacramento, California
- San Diego, California (since 2016)
- Victorville, California (beginning 2025, $470k three-year contract)
- Denver, Colorado (2021-2026)
- Hartford, Connecticut
- District of Columbia (over 500 installed sensors)
- Miami, Florida
- Bibb County, Georgia (7 square miles, since 2022, $2 million)
- Savannah, Georgia (since 2014)
- Elmwood Park, Illinois
- Peoria, Illinois
- Springfield, Illinois ($450k/year, six square miles)
- Louisville, Kentucky
- Baltimore, Maryland
- Baltimore County, Maryland ($738k/3 years, 5.2 sq mi)
- Bladensburg, Maryland
- Cambridge, Maryland
- New Bedford, Massachusetts
- Pittsfield, Massachusetts
- Springfield, Massachusetts
- Cambridge, Massachusetts
- Somerville, Massachusetts (since at least 2017)
- Detroit, Michigan ($7 million phased installation in 2022, 32 sq mi)
- Minneapolis, Minnesota
- Cape Girardeau, Missouri
- Omaha, Nebraska
- Las Vegas, Nevada (over 500 installed sensors)
- Albuquerque, New Mexico ($3 million, since 2020, over 500 installed sensors), called a "big fat waste of money" by the police union
- Camden, New Jersey (2020)
- Newark, New Jersey (2011)
- Trenton, New Jersey (2020)
- New York City (over 2000 sensors)
- Rochester, New York
- Syracuse, New York
- Fayetteville, North Carolina ($210k per year, 3 sq mi, started 2022)
- Cincinnati, Ohio
- Columbus, Ohio
- Mansfield, Ohio
- Youngstown, Ohio
- Warrensville Heights, Ohio
- Cleveland, Ohio ($2.8 million expansion to 13 sq mi in 2022 using American Rescue Plan Act funding)
- Darby, Pennsylvania
- Utica, New York
- Pittsburgh, Pennsylvania
- Aldine, Texas (5 sq mi, $780k for 3 years)
- Houston, Texas (10 sq mi, $74,000 per square mile per year)
- Virginia Beach, Virginia
- Tacoma, Washington (2 sq mi)
- Milwaukee, Wisconsin (installed in 2010; contract renewal in March 2023)

=== Pending ===
- Escambia County, Florida
- Pensacola, Florida
- Holyoke, Massachusetts (2 square miles, $150k/year)
- Sparks, Nevada
- Phillipsburg, New Jersey ($279k, 3.3 sq mi)
- Buffalo, New York
- Winston-Salem, North Carolina (installed in 2021; 3 sq. miles, purchased with a federal grant of almost $700k, not renewed in 2024)
- York, Pennsylvania (had used it previously, in 2023 the police captain said "it was terrible, it was awful")

== Declined installations ==
ShotSpotter has been removed or bids to install it were rejected in communities. It is considered controversial by many.

=== Former ===
- Mobile, Alabama
- Chicago, Illinois (over 100 square miles, 3-year $33 million contract; contract not renewed in February 2024, coverage ends September 2024, over 500 installed sensors)
- New Orleans, Louisiana (removed in 2013)
- Fall River, Massachusetts (began in 2012, cancelled in 2018 after missing gunfire events and false positives)
- Trenton, New Jersey
- Syracuse, New York ($450k, terminated in 2025)
- Charlotte, North Carolina (began in 2012, cancelled in 2016)
- Durham, North Carolina (pilot began in 2022, 3 square miles, $197k one-year contract, not renewed in 2024)
- Dayton, Ohio (3 square miles, started in 2019, cancelled in 2022)
- Canton, Ohio (switched to Wi-Fiber detection in 2019)
- Toledo, Ohio (discontinuing in 2025)
- San Juan, Puerto Rico (over 500 installed sensors, discontinued 2025)
- Cape Town, South Africa (2016–2019)
- San Antonio, Texas (cancelled in 2017)

=== Rejected ===
- Atlanta, Georgia (cancelled after trials in 2018 and 2022)
- Portland, Oregon: single-source plan was opened to other bids, then all gunshot location installations were rejected after community feedback
- Seattle, Washington: Mayor Bruce Harrell proposed spending $1 million on ShotSpotter in 2022, but in November 2022, the city council approved a budget that did not include such funding. Budget chair Teresa Mosqueda cited issues with the technology identified by other cities as the reason it was not being pursued.
