= Lorraine Mazerolle =

Australian criminologist and researcher

Lorraine Green Mazerolle AC FASSA (born 1964) is an Australian criminologist and professor at the School of Social Science at the University of Queensland, where she is also an affiliate professor at the Institute for Social Science Research. She is also a chief investigator in the Australian Research Council's Centre of Excellence for Children and Families over the Life Course, as well as a former Australian Research Council Laureate Fellow. She is the editor-in-chief of the Journal of Experimental Criminology. She is also a fellow of the Academy of the Social Sciences in Australia and the Academy of Experimental Criminology. She served as president of the Academy of Experimental Criminology. Her research interests include problem-oriented policing, civil remedies, and third-party policing.

== Education and career ==
Mazerolle received her Ph.D. from Rutgers University, and taught at the University of Cincinnati and Griffith University before joining the University of Queensland.

== Awards and honours ==
Mazerolle was awarded an Australian Laureate Fellowship in 2010. She was elected a Fellow of the Academy of the Social Sciences in Australia in 2014. She was appointed a Companion of the Order of Australia in the 2024 Australia Day Honours for "eminent service to education, to the social sciences as a criminologist and researcher, and to the development of innovative, evidence-based policing reforms".
