= Wesley Jennings =

American criminologist (born 1980)

Wesley G. Jennings
- Born: September 17, 1980 (age 45)
- Education: University of South Carolina, University of Florida
- Scientific career
- Fields: Criminology
- Institutions: University of South Florida, Texas State University
- Thesis: Trajectories of two Racine Birth Cohorts: a theoretically integrated model for explaining offending (2007)
- Academic advisors: Alex R. Piquero, Lonn Lanza-Kaduce

Wesley Glenn Jennings (born September 17, 1980) is an American criminologist.

== Career ==
He is currently a professor and department chair in the Department of Criminal Justice & Legal Studies at the University of Mississippi. He was previously a professor and coordinator of the doctoral program in the School of Criminal Justice at Texas State University and associate professor in the Department of Criminology at University of South Florida, where he was also the Department's associate chairman and undergraduate director. He has previously been recognized as the #1 criminologist in the world in a 2012 paper in the Journal of Criminal Justice Education. He is the former editor-in-chief of the American Journal of Criminal Justice and (with Lorie Fridell) the co-editor of Policing: An International Journal.

== Research ==
Jennings has studied the effectiveness of police use of body-worn cameras in Orlando, Florida.
