= Policing (journal) =

Academic journal covering the study of policing

- Discipline: Criminology
- Language: English
- Edited by: Lorie Fridell, Wesley Jennings

Publication details
- Former name(s): Police Studies
- History: 1978-present
- Publisher: Emerald Group Publishing
- Frequency: Quarterly
- Impact factor: 1.350 (2018)

Standard abbreviations
- ISO 4: Policing

Indexing
- ISSN: 1363-951X
- LCCN: 97660709
- OCLC no.: 36843449

Links
- Journal homepage; Online access

Policing: An International Journal of Police Strategies & Management is a quarterly peer-reviewed academic journal covering the study of policing. It was established in 1978 as Police Studies: International Review of Police Development, and obtained its current name in 1997, when it was merged with the American Journal of Police. It is published by Emerald Group Publishing, and the editors-in-chief are Lorie Fridell and Wesley Jennings (University of South Florida). According to the Journal Citation Reports, the journal has a 2016 impact factor of 0.646.
