= Journal of Experimental Criminology =

- Discipline: Criminology
- Language: English
- Edited by: Wesley Jennings

Publication details
- History: 2005-present
- Publisher: Springer Science+Business Media
- Frequency: Quarterly
- Open access: Hybrid
- Impact factor: 3.0 (2022)

Standard abbreviations
- ISO 4: J. Exp. Criminol.

Indexing
- ISSN: 1573-3750 (print); 1572-8315 (web)

Links
- Journal homepage; Online archive

The Journal of Experimental Criminology is a quarterly peer-reviewed academic journal covering experimental research in the field of criminology. It was established in 2005 with David Weisburd of George Mason University as the founding editor-in-chief, and the current editor-in-chief is Wesley Jennings (University of Mississippi). It is published by Springer Science+Business Media, and is sponsored by the Academy of Experimental Criminology. According to the Journal Citation Reports, the journal has a 2022 impact factor of 3.0.
