= Lorie Fridell =

American criminologist

- Born: Lorie Ann Fridell
- Education: Linfield College; University of California, Irvine
- Known for: Research on policing
- Scientific career
- Fields: Criminology
- Institutions: University of South Florida; Police Executive Research Forum
- Thesis: Diversion Programs for Intrafamilial Child Sexual Abuse Offenders: The Clients, the Referral Decision, and the Resumption of Prosecution (1987)

Lorie A. Fridell is an American criminologist known for her research on police and her implicit-bias training program. She is a professor emerita in the Department of Criminology at the University of South Florida (USF), where she taught starting in 2005. Before joining USF she taught at the University of Nebraska and Florida State University. For six years she served as director of research at the Police Executive Research Forum (1999-2005). She served as the co-editor-in-chief of Policing: An International Journal of Police Strategies & Management, along with her USF colleague Wesley Jennings.

== Education ==
Fridell was educated at Linfield College (B.A. in psychology, 1980) and the University of California, Irvine (M.A. and Ph.D. in social ecology in 1983 and 1987, respectively).

== Work ==
Fridell's research has cut across a number of law enforcement topics, but especially police use of force, violence against police and biased policing. She has served as an author, co-author or editor of seven books including, most recently Producing Bias-Free Policing: A Science-Based Approach (Singer Publishers). She has also published numerous academic articles and chapters. Fridell developed the "Fair & Impartial Policing" training program to help police recognize and manage their own implicit biases. Fair and Impartial Policing, LLC (FIP, LLC) is the #1 provider of implicit bias training for law enforcement in the U.S. (www.fipolicing.com) In recent years, FIP, LLC has produced customized curricula for non-police audiences including city/county workers, Fire/EMS professionals, prosecutors and others.
