= List of Peterbilt vehicles =

This is a list of vehicles manufactured by the American truck manufacturer Peterbilt since its 1939 founding.

== Current ==
Current Peterbilt vehicles
Model name	Production	Vehicle type	Notes
220	1998-2007 2011–present	medium-duty (Class 7) COE, low cab forward	Shares DAF LF cab with Kenworth K370 Built on frame of 330 conventional.
365; 367	2007–present	severe-service/vocational (Class 8)	365: 115-inch BBC, replaced 357 367: 123-inch BBC, replaced 378 Both models offered in set-back or set-forward front axle configuration
389X	2006−2024	on-highway (Class 8)	Is also called Peterbilt 389 Pride and class Replaced 379, with redesigned headlamps, fenders, and trim. Luxurious and Modified version of the 389 131-inch BBC (longest-produced by Peterbilt). Offered in Australia (through 3rd-party conversion to right-hand drive)
520	2016–present	vocational COE, low cab forward	Replaced 320, for refuse collection applications Redesigned to accommodate PACCAR engines and modernized interior
535 536 537 548	2021–present	535/536: Class 5/6 537/548: Class 7/8	Introduces the 535, 536, 537, and 548 with the connected windshield and having a 567 Cab. 535/536: The non-CDL trucks feature all-new self-closing doors with larger windows for increased visibility, three opening positions, and a triple seal. 537/548: feature two hood options: a vocational three-piece Metton® hood featuring a stationary grille with full through rail, and a three-piece SMC aero hood for maximum visibility. 535/536: 107 of 109-inch BBC 537/548: unknown Offered (535/536) as composite and steel bumpers as well as multiple options of fuel and DEF tanks. Offered (537/548) as both hood options can use a variety of vocational and FEPTO bumpers to fit different applications.
567	2015–present	severe-service/vocational (Class 8)	Shares cab with 579, headlights of 389 115 or 121-inch BBC Offered in set-back or set-forward front axle configurations Peterbilt delivered the 100,000th Model 567 in 2025.
579	2012–present	on-highway (Class 8)	Replaced 587 as newest Peterbilt "aerodynamic" conventional 123-inch BBC, 83-inch cab width
589	2024–present	on-highway (Class 8)	Replaced 389, with redesigned headlamps, fenders, and trim. 131-inch BBC (longest-produced by Peterbilt).

== Retired (1980 to date) ==
Retired Peterbilt vehicles
Model name	Production	Vehicle type	Notes
Mid-Ranger (200)	1987-1999	medium-duty (Class 5-7) COE, low cab forward	Version of the Volkswagen LT, using MAN G90 (wide-body) cab, produced in Brazil. Sold with American-market drivetrain
210	1998-2007 2011-???	medium-duty (Class 6) COE, low cab forward	Adaptation of DAF LF, shared with Kenworth Second generation built on 325 frame 26,000-pound GVWR; non-CDL applications
320	1987-2018	COE, low cab forward	Replaced 310 (and Kenworth Hustler) Added right-hand stand-up drive to cab
335 340	????-2009	335: Class 7 340: Class 7/8	It is the older models of the 337 and 348
349	1980-1987	on-highway (Class 8)	Light-GVWR highway tractor. Slightly sloped hood, wider grille than 348; also available with set-back front axle.
357	1986-???	on-highway (Class 8)	Severe-service/vocational model line. Similar in configuration to 378, but with heavier-duty chassis 111-inch through 123-inch BBC; set-back and set-forward front axles Flat-fender hood (similar to 353) offered as an option, along with front PTO
362	1981-2005	on-highway (Class 8) Cabover/COE	Replaced Model 352 COE; visually similar, all-new design. 54-inch to 110-inch BBC; multiple axle configurations (including tandem-steer) 362E (introduced c.1990) with greater interior room, easier entry
372	1988-1994	on-highway (Class 8) Cabover/COE	Last all-new Peterbilt COE design Developed to improve aerodynamics over 362 (sharing its doors and grille); received over 11 MPG in development testing Intended for team operation; raised-roof sleeper integrated into large roof fairing; rounded nose fairing raised for engine access. Unusual appearance created many nicknames, including "Winnebago", "football helmet", or "Darth Vader" (or less kind).
375	1987-2005	on-highway (Class 7/8)	First Peterbilt aerodynamic conventional; similar in concept to the Kenworth T600 and is the daycab version of the Peterbilt 377 that carry's lighter loads Fiberglass hood sloped similar to 349, with large fenders (incorporating headlamps and turn signals) 120-inch BBC (set-back front axle), 122-inch BBC (set-forward front axle) Directly replaced by 120-inch 385 (along with 387)
377	1986-2000	on-highway (Class 8)	First Peterbilt aerodynamic conventional; similar in concept to the Kenworth T600 Fiberglass hood sloped similar to 349, with large fenders (incorporating headlamps and turn signals) 120-inch BBC (set-back front axle), 122-inch BBC (set-forward front axle) Directly replaced by 120-inch 385 (along with 387)
378	1986-2007	on-highway (Class 8)	Replaced Model 348 Built for multiple applications, including vocational and on-highway. Similar to 379 (sharing its 119-inch BBC); a higher-mounted cab added a sloped hood design to the model line. Multiple axle configurations; set-forward and set-back front axles
379	1987-2007	on-highway (Class 8)	Replaced Model 359 as flagship Peterbilt conventional. 119-inch and 127-inch BBC In design change from 359, turn signals moved from fenders to (rectangular) headlamps Replaced by 389 in 2007
379X	2003–2005	on-highway (Class 8)	379X was a special edition of the 379. there were roughly 1-2000 of them produced. 119-inch and 127-inch BBC In design change from 359, turn signals moved from fenders to (rectangular) headlamps Replaced by 389 in 2007
384	2007-???	on-highway (Class 8)	116-inch BBC version of 386
385	1996-2007	on-highway (Class 8)	Developed to compete with Freightliner FLD 112 Similar in appearance to 377 (different hood slope) 112-inch BBC; set-back front axle standard 120-inch BBC replaced Model 377
386	2005-2015	on-highway (Class 8)	Combined aerodynamic hood design of 387 with standard Peterbilt cab design (except external air cleaners) 126-inch BBC
387	1999-2010	on-highway (Class 8)	Indirect replacement for Model 377; first Peterbilt aerodynamic conventional with "wide-body" cab Shares cab structure with Kenworth T2000; built on Peterbilt frame, 387 has different hood, roof fairing, and interior design. Produced as day cab, mid-roof sleeper, and raised-roof sleeper.
388	2006-2015	on-highway (Class 8)	123-inch BBC configuration of Model 389, replacing 119-inch version of 379 Renamed as 123-inch version of 389 in 2015
397	1980, 1982	Conventional (Class 9)	Largest Peterbilt model line, 2 examples built up to 500,000-pound weight capacity, with up to 600 hp engines
587	2010-2016	on-highway (Class 8)	Replaced 387 as Peterbilt "wide-body" aerodynamic conventional (similar to Kenworth T700) Redesigned hoodline to improve visibility and lighting. Produced as day cab, mid-roof sleeper, and raised-roof sleeper.
325	2007–2021	medium-duty (Class 5)	Built for non-CDL applications
330; 337; 348	2007–2021 (330) 2009–2021 (337,348)	medium-duty 330: Class 6 337: Class 7 348: Class 7/8	Introduces single-piece windshield to medium-duty trucks 330: Built for non-CDL applications 337: truck or semitractor, replaces 335 348: vocational applications, replaces 340
389	2006-2024	on-highway (Class 8)	Replaced 379, with redesigned headlamps, fenders, and trim. 131-inch BBC (longest-produced by Peterbilt).

== Historic (1980 & prior) ==
Before 1981, model designations started with 2 for single-drive (and tag axle) vehicles, and 3 for dual-drive vehicles. This distinction gradually was phased out in the late 1970s.

Model name	Production	Vehicle type	Notes
260 334	1939-1941	Conventional	First Peterbilt model line, evolved from a Fageol design. Logging trucks sold to the public 260: chain drive 334: dual drive axles
270 334 345	1941-1949	Conventional	On-highway truck Last model line developed by T.A. Peterman
354 355 364	1941-1949	Conventional	Heavy-duty truck 28 Model 364s produced for the US Navy (1942).
280 350	1949-1957	Conventional Cabover/COE (1949-1953)	On-highway truck, nicknamed the "Iron-nose" truck Butterfly-type hood with cycle-style fenders. Vertical shutters on grille COE version produced, nicknamed "bubble-nose" style (short hood)
281 351	1954-1976	Conventional	On-highway truck, nicknamed the "narrow-nose" truck First model line introduced with red Peterbilt emblem (at launch) Butterfly-type hood with cycle-style fenders. Horizontal shutters on grille Set-back front axle option introduced in 1971 (later becoming 353) NASA owned 4 such truck but retired two of them, R-13 and R-15. Due to problems with their cryogenic tanks.
281 351	1954-1958	Cabover/COE	First Peterbilt COE model line developed with its own cab Shares doors with 281/351 conventional
282 352 352H	1959-1980	Cabover/COE	First tilt-cab COE, developed as distinct model line; first UniLite cab Nicknamed the "Pacemaker" in 1969, coinciding with an update 54-inch to 110-inch BBC 352H is a raised-cab version, fitted with a larger radiator; produced from 1975-1980
288 358	1965-1976	Conventional	Variant of 281/351 with a tilting hood, first Peterbilt equipped with a design. Fiberglass hood introduced in 1972. First Peterbilt model line with current hood ornament design
289 348 (1967-1987) (Not the New 348) 353 359 359X	1967-1987	Conventional	Replaced 281/351 Distinguished by a wider grille for a larger radiator. The 353 is the heavy-duty version of the 359. Replaced by 379
CB300	c.1975-1978	COE, low cab forward	First Peterbilt truck designed for refuse applications Designed and produced jointly between Peterbilt and Kenworth
310 319	1978-1986	COE, low cab forward	Replaced CB300, designed for refuse applications Model 319 used rear PTO and rear lift axle with steering capability
351L		Conventional	Severe-service variant of 351 designed specifically for logging Flat diamond-plate fenders
341	1954-1972	Conventional	Short-hood variant of the 351 designed for vocational applications Replaced by 348
346	1972-1975	Conventional (Class 9)	Designed for vocational applications, with a (highly) set-back front axle Only 10 produced, second-rarest model line
348	1970-1986	Conventional	Designed for cement mixers and dump trucks First Peterbilt with a sloped fiberglass hood
353	1973-1987	Conventional	Designed for construction applications, flat steel fenders Used grille of 359 (radiator) with butterfly hood Replaced 341 and 351 vocational trucks
381	c.1975	Conventional	Severe-service truck, 6x6 drive configuration Flat fenders, butterfly hood; lower, narrower radiator than 383
383	c. 1966-1979	Conventional	Severe-service truck, 6x6 drive configuration Flat fenders extend to back of cab
387	1976-1987	Conventional (Class 9)	Severe-service truck, originally developed for coal transportation Later developed for multiple applications Model number reused in 1999 (only model line to do so)
391	c.1977	Conventional (Class 9)	Logging truck, similar in design to the 387; only one built Built using a Kenworth frame and a Peterbilt body, current whereabouts unknown

== Sleepers ==
In the 1960s and 1970s, 30" and 36" sleepers were available. If a buyer wanted a larger sleeper, Peterbilt worked with Mercury Sleepers for 40", 60", and custom sized sleepers. Mercury would paint the sleeper to match the factory paint or the sleeper came with polished quilted aluminum. In 1978, Peterbilt's engineers were tasked with making a bigger sleeper. They designed the 63" sleeper with rounded doors and a walk-through from the cab. The sleeper debuted on a 359-127" and can be seen in the 1978 brochure "Best in Class". This truck also featured the first set of rectangular headlamps. The first raised roof (high cube) sleeper was on a 359 in 1986 and with changes (no right hand forward door) carried through to the 379 family. In 1994, the Unibilt sleeper debuted with air-ride suspension for the cab and sleeper with a large cab to sleeper opening. The Unibilt sleeper suspension had a one piece shock/air bag mount system from 1994 to 2006, until Peterbilt redesigned the suspension system for the 2007 model year, making the shock and air bag system on separate brackets. The Unibilt cab/sleeper option allowed for the sleeper to be removed for a daycab conversion. The UltraSleeper was Peterbilt's largest and most luxurious. At 70" long, it featured a right-hand access door, table, closet and a small "wet closet" accessible from the driver's side to store boots, gloves, and other 'damp' items. The last UltraSleeper was built in 2005

== Gallery ==
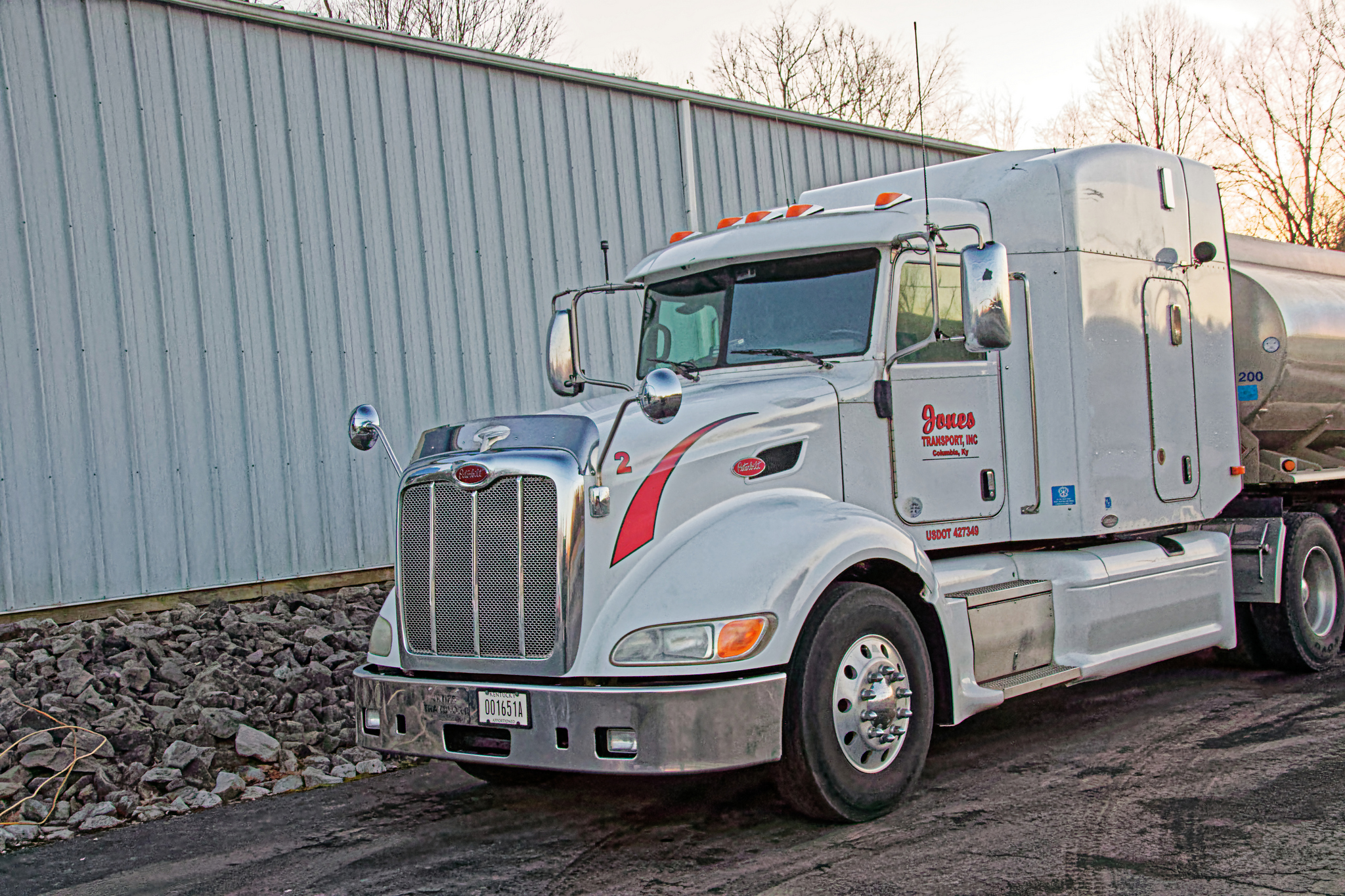
Peterbilt "386" In Kentucky
