= Preventive state =

A preventive state is a type of sovereign state or policy enacted by a state in which people deemed potentially dangerous are apprehended, and have their freedom restricted, before being able to commit a crime. Insofar as it differs from passive attempts to prevent criminal behaviour (i.e., statutes that regulate behaviour), it has been referred to by Eric S. Janus as "radical prevention". Its opposite is the punitive state, or any punitive methods, under which criminals are punished after a criminal act has been committed. To the extent that punitive methods often involve incarceration, thereby preventing further crimes being committed by the individual, they can also be considered preventive; the penological theory justifying this is incapacitation. Michael L. Rich further defines as the "perfect preventive state" a situation in which targeted criminal conduct is made impossible by the mandates of government.

There is a wide scope for the use of preventive methods, which is constantly increased by developing technologies; in-vehicle technology responding to a user's blood alcohol level (BAL) and restricting use; restrictive measures in the infrastructure of the World Wide Web (i.e., preventing users' being able to illegally download music). Several countries have deployed them as a means of anti-terrorism in the wake of terrorist attacks; preventive measures can include intelligence gathering, detention and interrogation. Suicide terrorism is an example where a more preventive model is required because punishment of the individual after the crime is not possible, especially since most democracies are committed to principles of individual guilt and can not punish friends or relatives for the crimes of the individual.

Preventive policies have raised serious concerns about liberty and freedom in modern democracies, and continue to generate debate.

== In popular culture ==
- The 2002 American film Minority Report, based on the Philip K. Dick short story of the same name is set in the near future when psychics are able to predict criminal acts before they have occurred.

== See also ==
- Crime prevention
- Deradicalization
- Pre-crime
- Predictive policing
