= Technologies in Minority Report =

Technologies in 2002 film

The 2002 science fiction neo-noir film Minority Report, based on the 1956 short story of the same name by Philip K. Dick, featured numerous fictional future technologies which have proven prescient based on developments around the world. Before the film's production began, director Steven Spielberg invited fifteen experts to think about technologies that would be developed by 2054, the setting of the film.

== Background ==
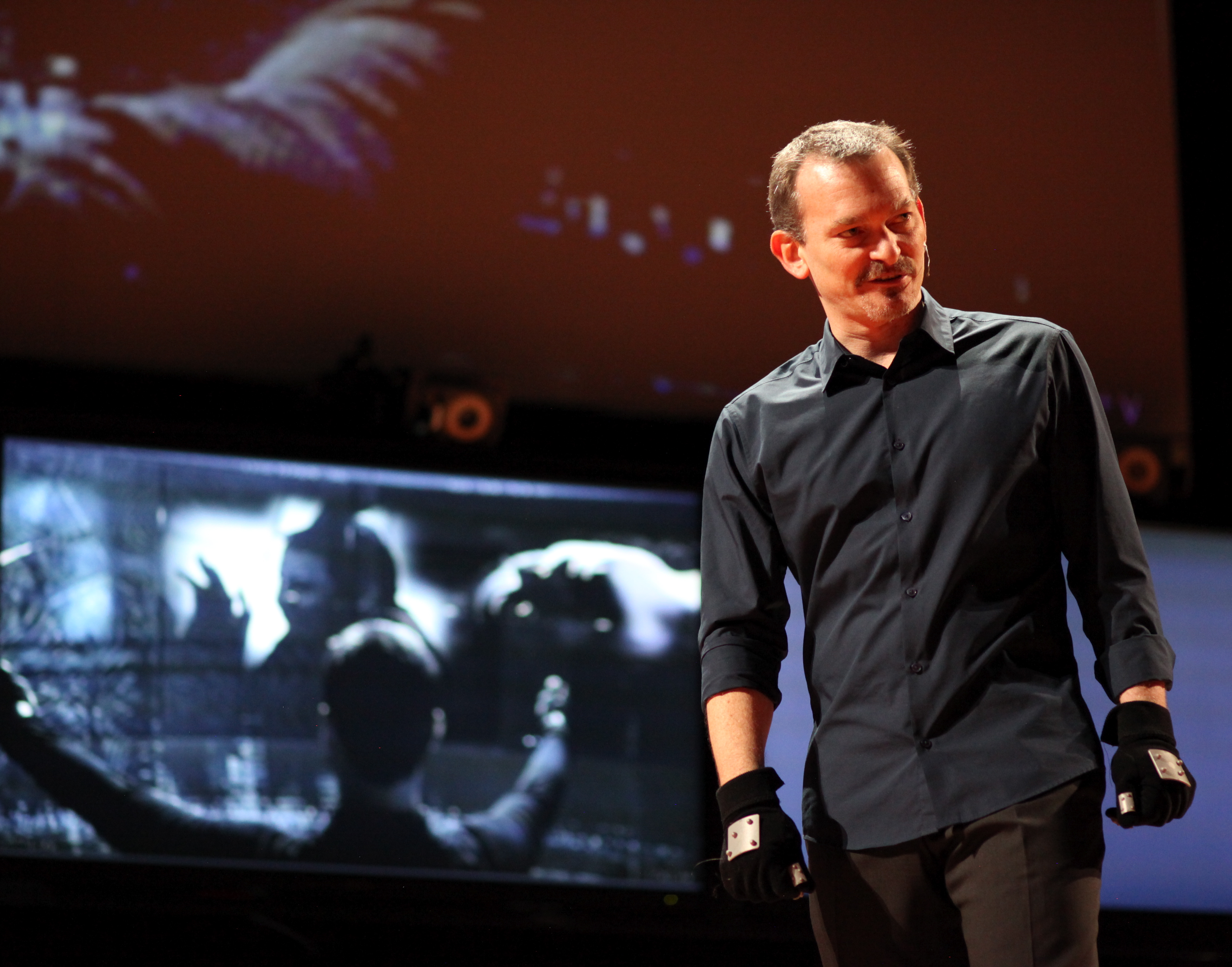
At the 2010 TED conference, Minority Report's Science Advisor, John Underkoffler, demos a real life version of the "spatial operating environment" interface.

After E.T., Spielberg started to consult experts and put more scientific research into his films. In 1999, he invited fifteen experts convened by the Global Business Network, its chairman Peter Schwartz, and its co-founder Stewart Brand to a hotel in Santa Monica, California for a three-day "think tank". He also invited journalist Joel Garreau to cover the event. He wanted to consult with the group to create a plausible "future reality" for the year 2054 as opposed to a more traditional "science fiction" setting. Dubbed the "think tank summit", the experts included architect Peter Calthorpe, Douglas Coupland, computer scientist Neil Gershenfeld, biomedical researcher Shaun Jones, computer scientist Jaron Lanier, and former Massachusetts Institute of Technology (MIT) architecture dean William J. Mitchell.

Production Designer Alex McDowell kept what was nicknamed the "2054 bible", an 80-page guide created in preproduction which listed all the decided upon aspects of the future world: architectural, socio-economical, political, and technological. While the discussions did not change key elements in the film's action sequences, they were influential in the creation of some of the more utopian aspects of the film, though John Underkoffler, the science and technology advisor for the film, described it as "much grayer and more ambiguous" than what was envisioned in 1999. John Underkoffler, who designed most of Anderton's interface after Spielberg told him to make it like "conducting an orchestra," said "it would be hard to identify anything [in the movie] that had no grounding in reality." For example, Underkoffler conscientiously treated his cinematic representation of the gestural interface as an actual prototype, “We worked so hard to make the gestural interface in the film real. I really did approach the project as if it were an R&D thing.” McDowell teamed up with architect Greg Lynn to work on some of the technical aspects of the production design. McDowell said that "[a] lot of those things Alex cooked up for Minority Report, like the 3-D screens, have become real."

Product placement was used to depict the predicted lack of privacy and excessive publicity in a future society. The advertisements in Minority Report were handled by Jeff Boortz of Concrete Pictures, who said "the whole idea, from a script point of view, was that the advertisements would recognize you -- not only recognize you, but recognize your state of mind. It's the kind of stuff that's going on now with digital set-top boxes and the Internet." Nokia designed the phones used by the characters, and Lexus paid the producers $5 million for the rights to design the futuristic "Mag-Lev" cars. All told money raised through product placement accounted for $25 million of the film's $102 million production budget.

== Real world influence ==
Spielberg described his ideas for the film's technology to Roger Ebert before the film's release:

I wanted all the toys to come true someday. I want there to be a transportation system that doesn't emit toxins into the atmosphere. And the newspaper that updates itself. ... The Internet is watching us now. If they want to, they can see what sites you visit. In the future, television will be watching us, and customizing itself to what it knows about us. The thrilling thing is, that will make us feel we're part of the medium. The scary thing us, we'll lose our right to privacy. An ad will appear in the air around us, talking directly to us.

News sources have noted the future technologies depicted in the film were prescient. The Guardian published a piece titled "Why Minority Report was spot on" in June 2010, and the following month Fast Company examined seven crime fighting technologies in the film similar to ones then currently appearing. It summarized that "the police state imagined in the Tom Cruise flick feels a bit more real every day." Other major media outlets such as the Wall Street Journal have published articles dedicated to this phenomenon, and National Public Radio (NPR) published an August 2010 podcast which analyzed the film's accuracy in predicting future technologies.

== Technologies realized ==
=== Multi-touch interfaces ===
Multi-touch interfaces, similar to Anderton's, have been put out by Microsoft (2007), Obscura Digital (2008), MIT (2009), Intel (2009), and Microsoft again, this time for their Xbox 360 (2010). A company representative, at the 2007 premiere of the then Microsoft Surface (later renamed to Microsoft PixelSense), promised it "will feel like Minority Report," and when Microsoft released the Kinect motion sensing camera add-on for their Xbox 360 gaming console in 2010, the Kinect's technology allowed several programmers, including students at MIT, to create Minority Report inspired user interfaces.

=== Iris scanners ===
Iris scanners, a form of biometrics, already existed by the time the film appeared in theaters. Media outlets described the systems manufactured by a Manhattan company named Global Rainmakers Incorporated (GRI) (2010) as similar to that in the movie. GRI disputed the notion that its technology could be the threat to privacy as it is in the film. "Minority Report is one possible outcome," a corporate official told Fast Company. "I don't think that's our company's aim, but I think what we're going to see is an environment well beyond what you see in that movie--minus the precogs, of course." The company is installing hundreds of the scanners in Bank of America locations in Charlotte, North Carolina, and has a contract to install them on several United States Air Force bases, though the technology does not work in the way depicted in the film.

== Technologies in development ==
Companies like Hewlett-Packard (HP) have announced they were motivated to do research by the film, in HP's case to develop cloud computing.

=== Autonomous cars ===
In the film, Anderton uses vehicles which can be both driven manually and autonomously; in one scene the police remotely override the vehicle in order to bring him into custody. Spielberg commissioned Lexus to design a car specifically for Minority Report, resulting in the Lexus 2054, a fuel-cell powered autonomous vehicle which is seen being built in an automated factory in the film. Autonomous, or self-driving cars have been in development since 1984. As Artificial Intelligence and ground-sensing technologies like LIDAR began to improve in the 2000s, major automotive manufacturers such as Ford, Nissan and General Motors began developing self-driving prototypes. Google began developing a self-driving vehicle prototype, named Waymo in 2009 while Tesla Motors rolled out the autopilot feature on their Model S vehicle in 2015. In 2011, the State of Nevada became the first jurisdiction in the world to formally legalise autonomous vehicles on public roads. Countries such as the United Kingdom (2013) France (2014), Switzerland (2015) and Singapore (2016) passed laws which allowed the testing of autonomous vehicles on public roads, with a view to further changes in legislation as the technologies improves.

=== Insect robots ===
Insect robots similar to the film's spider robots are being developed by the United States Military. These insects will be capable of reconnaissance missions in dangerous areas not fit for soldiers, such as "occupied houses". They serve the same purpose in the film. According to the developer, BAE Systems, the "goal is to develop technologies that will give our soldiers another set of eyes and ears for use in urban environments and complex terrain; places where they cannot go or where it would be too dangerous."

=== Gesture recognition ===
Multiple gesture recognition technologies currently in existence or under development have been compared to the one in the film.

=== Personalized advertising ===
Most of the advertising to consumers in Minority Report occurs when they are out of their homes. The advertisements interact in various ways; an Aquafina splashes water on its customers, Guinness recommends its products to the downtrodden to recover from "a hard day at work", a cereal box from which Anderton eats has a video advertisement, and when Anderton is fleeing the PreCrime force, an American Express advertisement observes, "It looks like you need an escape, and Blue can take you there," and a Lexus ad says, "A road diverges in the desert. Lexus. The road you're on, John Anderton, is the one less traveled." The advertisements in Minority Report were handled by Jeff Boortz of Concrete Pictures, who said "the whole idea, from a script point of view, was that the advertisements would recognize you—not only recognize you, but recognize your state of mind. It's the kind of stuff that's going on now with digital set-top boxes and the Internet."

Although the advertising-oriented website ClickZ called the film's interactive advertisements "a bit farfetched" in 2002, billboards capable of facial recognition are being developed by the Japanese company NEC. These billboards will theoretically be able to recognize passers-by via facial recognition, call them by name, and deliver customer specific advertisements. Thus far, the billboards can recognize age and gender and deliver demographically appropriate advertisements, but cannot discern individuals. According to The Daily Telegraph, the billboards will "behave like those in...Minority Report," uniquely identifying and communicating to those in their vicinities. IBM is developing similar billboards, with plans to deliver customized advertisements to individuals who carry identity tags. Like NEC, the company feels they will not be obtrusive as their billboards will only advertise products in which a customer is interested. Advertisers are embracing these billboards as they attempt to reduce costs by wasting fewer advertisements on uninterested consumers.

=== Crime prediction software ===
Crime prediction software was developed by a professor from the University of Pennsylvania (2010). As in the film, the program was announced for a trial run in Washington D.C., which, if successful, would have led to a national rollout. University of Chicago researchers published work on an approach to predicting crime up to a week in advance, but based on the geographic location rather than by the perpetrator, a privacy shortcoming of the Criminal Reduction Utilising Statistical History system. Crime prediction systems have been described by McCulloch and Pickering in 2009 as producing the futures it purports to prevent, and ins ome cases have been viewed as violating the European Convention on Human Rights.

In 2026, 404 Media reported that DHS's Predictive Intelligence Targeting Team (PITT) was working with local police to pull over people who were not suspected of any particular crime. PITT analyzes American's financial data and, when the results showed someone may have committed a crime, they feed the information to local law enforcement. The data gives police a pretext to pull over and detain people, often with the goal of finding something incriminating. It is unclear whether the data used was obtained legally. A similar predictive system involving extensive monitoring of suspects exists in Pasco County, Florida, and one "murder prediction system" was found to be in development by the United Kingdom's Ministry of Justice in 2025.

=== E-papers ===
Xerox has been trying to develop something similar to e-paper since before the film was released in theaters. Electronic paper has been announced as being developed by MIT (2005), Germany (2006), media conglomerate Hearst Corporation (2008), and the South Korean electronics manufacturer LG (2010). In 2005, when the Washington Post asked the chief executive of MIT's spin-off handling their research when "the Minority Report newspaper" would be released, he predicted "around 2015." Tech Watch's 2008 article "‘Minority Report’ e-newspaper on the way" noted that Hearst was "pushing large amounts of cash into" the technology.

== Jet packs ==
Spielberg decided to add the jetpacks worn by the policemen as a tribute to old science-fiction serials such as Commando Cody, even though the scientists considered them unrealistic. The jet packs are the only future technology depicted in the film which originated in science fiction. They already exist and perhaps their most famous flights occurred in the pregame ceremonies before Super Bowl I in 1967 and in Los Angeles in the 1984 Summer Olympics during that event's ceremonies. They have been held back as there is currently no way to mitigate their dangers to the operator and have extremely limited range.

== See also ==
- 3D human–computer interaction
