= Crime prevention =

Measures to reduce and deter crime

Crime prevention refers to strategies and measures that reduce the risk of crime occurring by intervening before a crime has been committed. It encompasses many approaches, including developmental, situational, community-based and criminal-justice interventions, to address risk factors at individual, family, community and societal levels. These strategies aim to deter potential offenders, reduce opportunities for offending and mitigate the fear of crime among the public. They are used by governments to reduce crime, enforce the law, maintain criminal justice and uphold overall stability.

== Studies ==
Criminologists, commissions and research bodies such as the World Health Organization, the United Nations, the United States National Research Council and the UK Audit Commission research policies to reduce the rates of interpersonal crime. They agree governments must go beyond law enforcement and criminal justice, reducing the risk factors for crime because it is more cost-effective and leads to greater social benefits than the punitive approaches crime. Opinion polls also confirm public support for investment in prevention. Criminology Professor Irvin Waller uses these materials in his 2006 book Less Law, More Order to propose specific measures to reduce crime as well as propose a crime bill.

The World Health Organization (WHO) Guide (2004) complements the World Report on Violence and Health (2002) and the World Health Assembly Resolution 56-24 (2003) suggesting governments to implement these nine points:

1. Create, implement and monitor a national action plan for violence prevention.
2. Enhance violence data collection capacity.
3. Define priorities for, and support research on, the causes, consequences, costs, and prevention of violence.
4. Promote primary prevention responses.
5. Strengthen responses for victims of violence.
6. Integrate violence prevention into social and educational policies and thereby promote gender and social equality.
7. Increase collaboration and exchange of information on violence prevention.
8. Promote and monitor adherence to international treaties, laws and other mechanisms to protect human rights.
9. Seek practical, internationally agreed responses to the global drugs and global arms trade.

The commissions agree municipalities are best able to organize the strategies that reduce risk factors. The European Forum for Urban Security and the United States Conference of Mayors stress that municipal programs must meet the needs of at-risk youth and women.

To success depends on the collaboration of key agencies such as schools, job creation, social services, housing and law enforcement.

== Types ==
A combination of factors is necessary for a crime to occur:

1. An individual or group must have the desire or motivation to participate in a banned or prohibited behaviour.
2. Some participants must have the skills and tools needed to commit the crime.
3. An opportunity must be acted upon.

Primary prevention addresses individual and family-level factors correlated with later criminal participation. Individual level factors such as attachment to school and involvement in pro-social activities decrease the probability of criminal involvement.

Family-level factors such as consistent parenting skills similarly reduce individual level risk. Risk factors are additive: the more risk factors present, the greater the risk of criminal involvement. Some initiatives seek to alter crime rates at the community or aggregate level.

For example, Larry Sherman of the University of Maryland, in Policing Domestic Violence (1993), demonstrated that modifying police response policies to domestic violence calls influenced the likelihood of repeat incidents. Policing areas of known criminal activity decreases the number of criminal events reported to police in those areas. Other initiatives include community policing to capture known criminals. Organizations such as America's Most Wanted and Crime Stoppers help catch these criminals.

Secondary prevention techniques focus on youth at high risk to commit crime, especially youth who drop out of school or get involved in gangs. It targets social programs and law enforcement in neighborhoods where crime rates are high. Much of the crime in neighborhoods with high crime rates is related to social and physical problems. Secondary crime prevention in Birmingham and Bogotá achieved large reductions in crime and violence. General social services, educational institutions and police focus on youth who are at risk, significantly reducing crime.

Tertiary prevention is used after a crime has occurred in order to prevent successive incidents. Such measures can be seen in the implementation of new security policies following acts of terrorism such as the September 11, 2001 attacks.

Situational crime prevention reduces the opportunity to commit crime. Techniques include increasing the difficulty and risk of a crime.

== Crime prevention through environmental design ==
Crime prevention through environmental design (CPTED) is a crime prevention strategy using the natural and built environment to reduce the opportunity to commit crime. Popularized by criminologist C. Ray Jeffrey in the United States, CPTED uses tools such as abundant lighting, street-facing windows, and a lack of high barriers or obstructions to reduce the perception of crime and opportunity to commit it.

== Situational crime prevention ==
=== Introduction and description ===
Situational crime prevention (SCP) is a preventive approach, reducing the opportunities for crime. It was first outlined in a 1976 report by the British Home Office. SCP focuses on the criminal setting differing from most criminology, examining the circumstances that allow forms of crime. Understanding these circumstances, relevant environments are changed to reduce opportunities for crime. SCP intends to make criminal activities less appealing to offenders.

SCP focuses on opportunity-reducing processes that:

- Are aimed at particular forms of crime;
- Manipulate the immediate environment an organized and permanent manner.
- Make crime more difficult, risky, or less rewarding and justifiable.

SCP creates safety mechanisms that protect people, making potential criminals feel unable to commit crimes because they may be caught or detected.

Situational crime prevention opportunity reducing techniques include:

- Increasing the Effort: Target hardening (e.g. tamper-proof packaging), controlling access to facilities (electronic card access), applying screen exits (electronic merchandise tags), incapacitation of offenders (prison), deflecting offenders (dispersing pubs) and controlling tools or weapons (disabling stolen mobile phones).
- Increasing the Risks: Extending guardianship (e.g. neighborhood watch), assisting natural surveillance (adequate street lighting), reducing anonymity (compulsory taxi identification cards), utilizing place managers (rewarding vigilance) and strengthening formal surveillance (security guards).
- Reduce the Rewards: Concealing targets (e.g. unmarked bullion trucks), removing targets (women's shelter), identifying property (cattle branding), disrupting markets (monitoring of pawn shops) and denying benefits (speed humps).
- Reduce Provocations: Reducing frustrations and stress (e.g. efficient queues and polite service), avoiding disputes (separate enclosures for rival soccer fans), reducing emotional arousal (controls on violent pornography), neutralizing peer pressure (targeting and removing troublemakers from a school) and discouraging imitation (V-chips in televisions).
- Remove any excuses: Includes setting rules (e.g. rental agreements), posting instructions ('No Parking' signs), alerting conscience (roadside speed display boards), assisting compliance (easy library check-out) and controlling drugs and alcohol (alcohol free zones)

An example of SCP in practice is automated traffic enforcement. Automated traffic enforcement systems (ATES) use automated cameras on roads to catch speeding drivers and those running red lights, attempting to reduce illegal driving incidents. Someone who is about to speed or run a red light knows they will probably be caught by these systems. This disincentivizes speeding or running red lights where they know have ATES. Though not conclusive, evidence shows that these types of systems work. In Philadelphia, some of the most dangerous intersections had a 96% reduction in red light violations after installation and advertisement of an ATES system.

== Applying to information systems ==
Situational crime prevention moves away from "dispositional" theories of crime commission such as psychosocial factors or genetic makeup of a criminal. Rather than focus on the criminal, SCP focuses on circumstances that lend themselves to crime commission. This enables measures that alter the environmental factors to reduce opportunities for criminal behavior.

=== Application to cybercrimes ===
It has been suggested that cybercriminals be assessed in terms of their criminal attributes, which include skills, knowledge, resources, access and motives (SKRAM).

These techniques can be specifically adapted to cybercrime as follows:

Increasing the effort

Reinforcing targets and restricting access- the use of firewalls, encryption, card/password access to ID databases and banning hacker websites and magazines.

Increasing the risk

Reinforcing authentication procedures and background checks for employees with database access, tracking keystrokes of computer users, use of photo and thumb print for ID documents/credit cards, requiring additional ID for online purchases, use of cameras at ATMs and at point of sale.

Reducing the rewards

Removing targets and disrupting cyberplaces with methods such as monitoring Internet sites and incoming spam, harsh penalties for hacking, rapid notification of stolen or lost credit cards, avoiding ID numbers on all official documents.

Reducing provocation and excuses

Avoiding disputes and temptations helps with maintaining positive employee-management relations and increasing awareness of responsible use policy.

Many of these techniques do not require a considerable investment in IT skills or knowledge. Effective utilization and training of existing personnel that is key.

Situational crime prevention may be useful in improving information systems security by decreasing the expected rewards of crime. Many businesses/organizations are heavily dependent on information and communications technology. While digitised information enables easy access and sharing by users, cybercrime threatens such information, whether committed by an external hacker or by a trusted member of an organization. After viruses, illicit access and theft of information form the highest percentage of financial loss from cybercrime. Cybercriminals may obtain passwords, read and alter files and read emails, but such crime can be prevented if criminal cannot access computer systems or are identified quickly enough.

Despite many years of computer security research, huge investments in secure operations, and raised training requirements, there are frequent penetrations and data thefts from some of the most heavily protected computer systems in the world. Criminal behavior in cyberspace is increasing with computers being used for numerous illegal activities, including email surveillance, credit card fraud and software piracy.

In the case of computer crime, even cautious companies or businesses that aim to create effective and comprehensive security measures may unintentionally produce an environment which helps provide opportunities because they are using inappropriate controls.

=== Situational crime prevention and fraud ===
In computer systems that have been developed to design out crime from the environment, one of the tactics used is risk assessment, where business transactions, clients and situations are monitored for any features that indicate a risk of criminal activity. Credit card fraud has been one of the most complex crimes worldwide. Fraud management techniques, include early warning systems, identifying signs and patterns of different types of fraud, profiles of users and their activities. Fraud management is a challenging task, including a huge volume of data involved, requiring fast and accurate fraud detection without inconveniencing business operations, identifying evasion of existing techniques, and minimising the risk of false alarms.

Generally, fraud detection techniques fall into two categories: statistical techniques and artificial intelligence techniques.

Important statistical data analysis techniques to detect fraud include:

- grouping and classification to determine patterns and associations among sets of data,
- matching algorithms to identify irregularities in the transactions of users compared to previous proof, and
- data pre-processing techniques for validation, correction of errors and estimating incorrect or missing data.

Important AI techniques for fraud management are:

- data mining – to categorize and group data and automatically identify associations and rules that may be indicative of remarkable patterns, including those connected to fraud;
- specialist systems to program expertise for fraud detection in the shape of rules;
- pattern recognition to identify groups or patterns of behavior either automatically or to match certain inputs;
- machine learning techniques to automatically detect the characteristics of fraud; and
- neural networks that can learn suspicious patterns and later identify them.

== Application to sexual abuse ==
Smallbone et al.'s Integrated Theory of Child Sexual Abuse advocates the study of child sexual abuse as a situationally specific incident, and that many factors influence the likelihood of an incident. Situational factors, the setting of the abuse, can influence not just whether a person abuses a child, but whether the idea of abusing occurs in the first place. The opportunities and dynamics of a situation are present cues, stressors, temptations and perceived provocations, which trigger motivation.

Considering situational factors suggests some offenders may be 'situational', marking them out from other types. A 'situational offender' is not primarily attracted to children, rather they are stimulated to offend by specific behavioral cues or stressors, often while performing caregiving duties. The theory's authors advocate for modifying situations experienced by children, to lower the likelihood of abuse. There has been little testing of situational interventions, meaning there is insufficient evidence to demonstrate their effectiveness.

A program working with mothers in London illustrated challenges they faced in identifying and reducing the situational risk of child sexual abuse in the home:

1. increasing understanding about abuse, including how and where it happens;
2. accepting the possibility of abuse at home and in the family;
3. accurately assessing the risks posed to one's own children; and
4. lowering known risks by negotiating with family members.

== Applications ==
Neighborhoods can adopt various strategies to reduce violent crime. The broken windows theory, though widely disputed, posits that visible signs of disorder in neighborhoods may encourage criminal activity due to perceived weak social control. Research suggests that changes to the built environment can contribute to crime reduction. These changes include reducing the density of high-rise public housing, implementing zoning reforms, limiting the number of liquor licenses in a given area, and maintaining and securing vacant lots and buildings.

In Colombia, the National Police uses an artificial-intelligence and data-analysis program to generate heat maps that visualize recorded crime activity. The information is used to plan patrol routes and allocation of police resources.

== See also ==
- Deradicalization
- Crime displacement
- Crime statistics
- Criminal justice
- Habitual offender
- Predictive policing
- Preventive state
- Recidivism

== Bibliography ==
- Audit Commission, Misspent youth: Young people and crime, London: Audit Commission for Local Authorities and NHS in England and Wales, 1996
- Her Majesty's Inspectorate of Constabulary, Beating crime, London: Home Office, 1998
- Home Office, Reducing offending: An assessment of research evidence on ways of dealing with offending behaviour, edited by Peter Goldblatt and Chris Lewis. London: Home Office, Research and Statistics, 1998
- International Centre for Prevention of Crime, Urban Crime Prevention and Youth at Risk: Compendium of promising strategies and programs from around the world, Montreal, 2005
- International Centre for Prevention of Crime, Crime Prevention Digest II: Comparative Analysis of Successful Community Safety, Montreal, 1999
- International Centre for Prevention of Crime, 100 Crime Prevention Programs to Inspire Action across the World, Montreal, 1999
- National Research Council (US), Fairness and Effectiveness in Policing: The Evidence, edited by Wesley Skogan, Washington, DC: The National Academies Press, 2004
- National Research Council (U.S.), Juvenile crime, juvenile justice, edited by Joan McCord, et al., Washington, DC: National Academies Press, 2001
- National Research Council and Institute of Medicine, Violence in families: assessing prevention and treatment programs, Committee on the Assessment of Family Violence Interventions, Board on Children, Youth, and Families, Edited by Rosemary Chalk and Patricia King. Washington, DC: National Academies Press, 2004
- Sherman, Lawrence, David Farrington, Brandon Welsh, Doris MacKenzie, 2002, Evidence-Based Crime Prevention, New York: Routledge
- Skogan, Wesley and Susan Hartnett, Community Policing: Chicago Style, New York: Oxford University Press, 1997
- United Nations, Economic and Social Council, Guidelines for the Prevention of Crime, New York: United Nations, Economic and Social Council, Office for Drug Control and Crime Prevention, 2002
- Waller, Irvin, Less Law, More Order: The Truth about Reducing Crime, West Port: Praeger Imprint Series, 2006
- Welsh, Brandon, and David Farrington, eds., Preventing Crime: What Works for Children, Offenders, Victims, and Places, New York: Springer, 2006
- World Health Organization, World report on road traffic injury prevention: Summary, Geneva, 2004
- World Health Organization, Preventing violence: A guide to implementing the recommendations of the World Report on Violence and Health, Geneva: Violence and Injuries Prevention, 2004
- World Health Organization, World Report on Violence and Health, Geneva: Violence and Injuries Prevention, 2002
