= Lexus 2054 =

Minority Report concept car

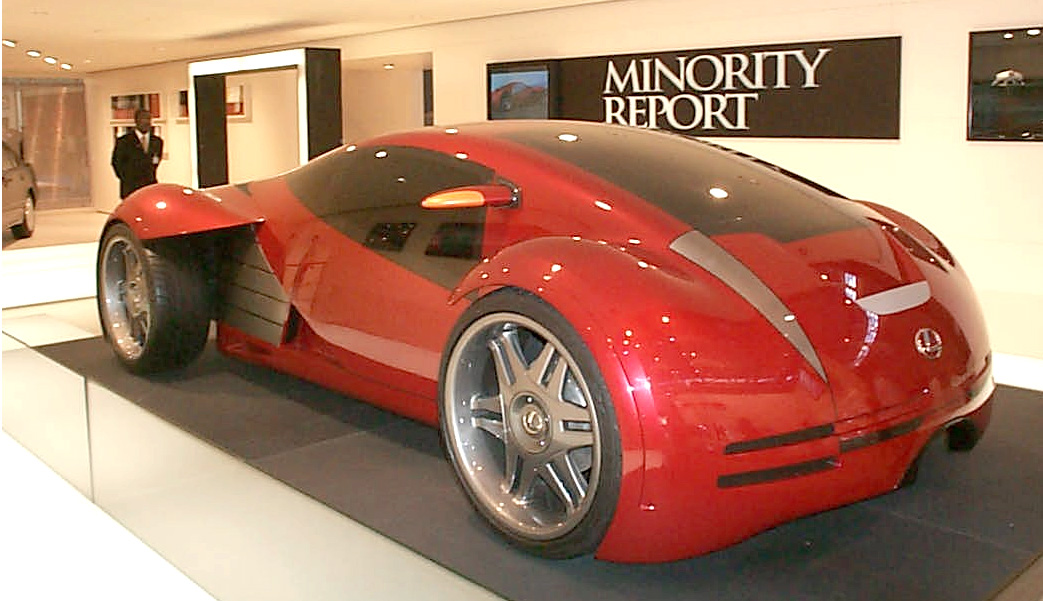
Lexus 2054 front view

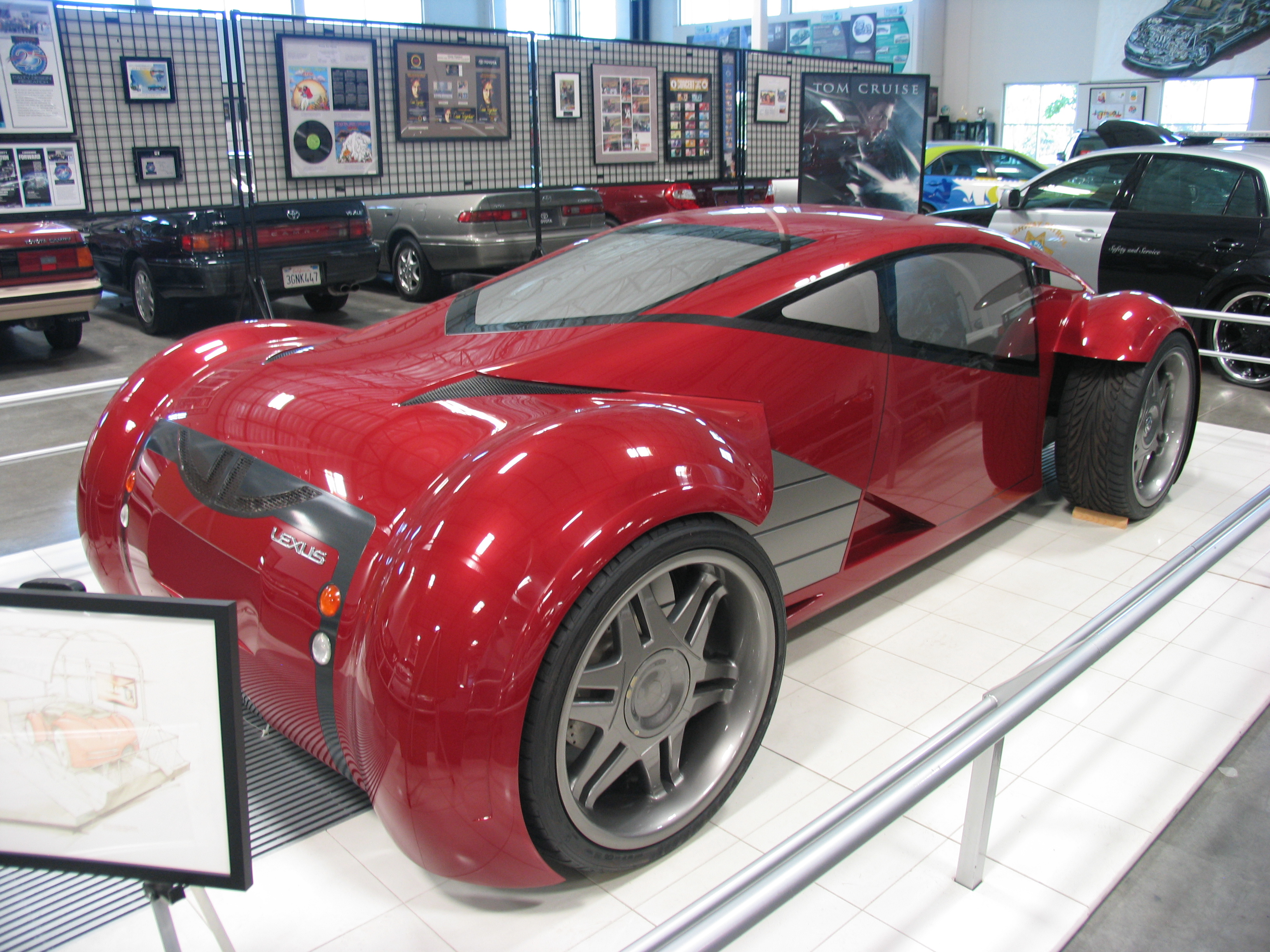
Lexus 2054 rear view

The Lexus 2054 is a concept car designed by Harald Belker for the 2002 Steven Spielberg film Minority Report. The vehicle was shown being built at an automated factory in the film, and later driven by star Tom Cruise in several action sequences.

== History ==
In 2002, Lexus was requested by Steven Spielberg, a Lexus owner himself, to design a vehicle that would fit the requirements of year 2054 for his movie adaptation of the 1956 Philip K. Dick short story "The Minority Report". Designer Harald Belker worked with Calty, the Toyota/Lexus design studio in California. They came up with an advanced vehicle that would run on fuel cells and have many advanced safety features, including a crash-proof structure and biometric security systems. (Lexus's cinematic concept car also appears in the 2005 film The Island, a red one in a stationary scene, a blue one in a driving sequence, and a silver one shown in a parking lot).

A film tie-in site proposed a Lexus future vehicle that would drive itself, take dinner orders verbally, and select music to match occupant moods. The Lexus 2054 later appeared at several auto shows and public events. The site won several advertising awards. Lexus paid $5 million for the rights to market the vehicle and its brand in relation to the film.

== Die-cast scale models ==
The Maisto toy company produced a 1/24 scale replica of the car that was sold exclusively at the Sharper Image to promote the film.

Hot Wheels created their own version of the car called the Phantom Racer, also designed by Belker himself due to licensing issues.
