= Spatial thinking =

Spatial thinking may refer to:

- Spatial cognition
- Spatial memory
- Spatial intelligence (disambiguation)
