= Maharashtra Advanced Research and Vigilance for Enhanced Law Enforcement =

AI system by the Maharashtra Police

Maharashtra Advanced Research and Vigilance for Enhanced Law Enforcement (MARVEL)
Agency overview
- Formed: 16th March 2024
- Jurisdiction: Maharashtra
- Headquarters: Nagpur, Maharashtra, India
- Annual budget: ₹23 crore (initial allocation)
- Agency executive: IPS Harssh Poddar, Chief Executive Officer
- Parent agency: Maharashtra Police

Maharashtra Advanced Research and Vigilance for Enhanced Law Enforcement (MARVEL) is an artificial intelligence (AI) system implemented by the Maharashtra Police. It is noted for being the first state-level police AI system in India. Approved in 2024, MARVEL aims to integrate AI technologies into law enforcement to enhance crime-solving capabilities and improve predictive policing.

== History ==
The Maharashtra state cabinet approved the creation of MARVEL in March 2024, just before the announcement of the Model Code of Conduct for the Lok Sabha elections. The project was allocated an initial budget of ₹23 crore.

== Leadership ==
MARVEL is overseen by officials from the Maharashtra Police and the Indian Institute of Management (IIM) Nagpur. The Superintendent of Police, Nagpur (Rural), Harssh Poddar, serves as the ex-officio Chief Executive Officer (CEO) of MARVEL. Dr. Bhimaraya Metri, the Director of IIM Nagpur, acts as an ex-officio director of the company.

== Structure and Partnerships ==
MARVEL is established as a Special Purpose Vehicle (SPV) and operates through a partnership between:

- Government of Maharashtra
- Indian Institute of Management Nagpur
- Pinaca Technologies Private Limited

The company is registered under the Companies Act 2013 and has its office located at the Indian Institute of Management in Nagpur.

== Funding ==
The Government of Maharashtra has committed to providing 100% share capital to MARVEL for the first five years, amounting to ₹4.2 crore annually.

== Related Initiatives ==
In addition to MARVEL, the Maharashtra government has approved other technology-driven law enforcement initiatives:

- A ₹76 crore semi-automated processing project for the speedy disposal of cybercrime cases
- Establishment of a ₹42 crore Computer Forensic Science Centre of Excellence

== See also ==
- Maharashtra Police
- Artificial intelligence in law enforcement
