= Spatial intelligence =

Spatial intelligence may refer to:

- Spatial intelligence (artificial intelligence)
- Spatial intelligence (business method)
- Spatial intelligence (psychology)
