= Spatial intelligence (artificial intelligence) =

Emerging concept in artificial intelligence

Spatial intelligence is a term used in artificial intelligence research to describe systems capable of perceiving, understanding, reasoning about, generating, and interacting with three-dimensional physical and virtual environments. It emphasizes "world models" that incorporate spatial relationships, geometry, physics, and dynamics, in contrast to text- or image-centric models.

The concept has been prominently advocated by computer scientist Fei-Fei Li, who has described it as a necessary next step for artificial intelligence beyond large language models. Li co-founded World Labs in 2024 to develop related technologies.

== Definition ==
According to Stanford HAI (Stanford Human-Centered Artificial Intelligence), spatial intelligence in artificial intelligence refers to systems that can understand and reason about the three-dimensional physical world, including how objects relate to each other in space, how they move, and how they interact. In other words, spatial intelligence refers to systems that can perceive, interpret, and navigate physical environments, understanding depth, geometry, physics, and spatial relationships the way humans do.

Fei-Fei Li has characterized it as the ability of artificial intelligence to perceive, reason about, generate, and interact with 3D environments in a manner grounded in physical reality, contrasting it with the more abstract capabilities of large language models.

== History ==
The modern usage of the term in artificial intelligence gained attention in 2024 when Fei-Fei Li began publicly promoting the term spatial intelligence as a key research direction in the AI field. In a May 2024 TED Talk and subsequent writings, she argued that artificial intelligence systems need this capability to achieve more human-like understanding of the physical world and will transform how human society creates and interacts with real and virtual worlds, thus revolutionizing storytelling, robotics, scientific discovery, and more.

=== Research and Development ===
Research groups working in this area include:

- Li co-founded World Labs in early 2024 to pursue this area. The company raised $230 million in its initial round and an additional $1 billion in February 2026. They have released Marble, a multimodal world model for generating and editing 3D environments.
- Stanford University’s Institute for Human-Centered Artificial Intelligence (HAI) and Li’s Stanford Vision and Learning Lab.
- NVIDIA operates a Spatial Intelligence Lab (SIL) focused on related technologies for perception, modeling, and interaction with the physical world.

=== Technologies ===
Enabling technologies discussed in relation to spatial intelligence include computer vision and multimodal models for 3D perception, as well as generative 3D techniques such as 3D Gaussian Splatting used in models like World Labs’ Marble to produce spatially consistent, persistent, and navigable environments from text, image, video, or panorama inputs.

NVIDIA’s Spatial Intelligence Lab advances foundational technologies for artificial intelligence systems to perceive, model, and interact with the physical world.

=== Applications ===
Proponents suggest potential uses in robotics and embodied artificial intelligence (such as navigation, manipulation, and human-robot collaboration), creative tools for film, video games, and architecture (for example, rapid generation of explorable 3D worlds with Marble), scientific simulation, and industrial planning including facility modeling, safety scenario testing, and operational strategy rehearsal. These applications remain largely prospective as of 2026.

== Industry examples ==
- World Labs develops multimodal world models such as Marble for generating and editing editable 3D environments.
- NVIDIA researches and invests in spatial intelligence through its dedicated Spatial Intelligence Lab.
- As an example of modality expansion in spatial intelligence research, Butlr, an MIT Media Lab spin-out, demonstrates how low-resolution infrared thermal sensing can contribute to physical-world modeling. Its privacy-preserving sensing systems apply AI to thermal signals to infer human presence, movement, and activity patterns in buildings, positioning IR as a complementary modality for studying world models of occupied environments.

== Relationship to other concepts ==
Spatial intelligence is often discussed alongside or as complementary to world models, embodied artificial intelligence, and spatial computing. It focuses on the artificial intelligence system’s internal representation and reasoning about space, whereas spatial computing more commonly refers to user-facing interfaces in 3D environments.

== See also ==
- World model
- Embodied artificial intelligence
- Spatial computing
- Computer vision
- Robotics
- Fei-Fei Li
- NVIDIA
