= Jon Cohen (writer) =

American novelist and screenwriter

- Occupations: Novelist, screenwriter

Jon Cohen is an American novelist and screenwriter. As a screenwriter he is best known for his co-writing contribution to the Steven Spielberg-directed film Minority Report (2002).

A native of Swarthmore, Pennsylvania, Cohen worked as a critical care nurse in Philadelphia before becoming a writer. He published four books: Max Lakeman and the Beautiful Stranger (1991), The Man in the Window (first published in 1992 and then reissued 2013 by Nancy Pearl's Book Lust Rediscoveries), Dentist Man (1993), and Harry's Trees (2018). He received a creative writing grant from the National Endowment for the Arts in 1991. In 2002, he won a Saturn Award for Best Writing for his work on Minority Report, sharing the award with co-writer Scott Frank.
