= Minority Report: Everybody Runs =

2002 video game

- Developers: Treyarch; Torus Games (GBA)
- Publisher: Activision
- Producer: Alexander W. Offermann
- Designer: Brian Reed
- Programmer: Shawn Baird
- Artist: Sukru Gilman
- Composers: Michael Hampton; Jesper Kyd
- Engine: Treyarch NGL
- Platforms: Game Boy Advance; PlayStation 2; GameCube; Xbox
- Release: Game Boy Advance: NA: November 12, 2002; EU: November 29, 2002; PlayStation 2: NA: November 19, 2002; EU: November 29, 2002; GameCube & Xbox: NA: November 19, 2002; EU: December 6, 2002
- Genres: Beat 'em up, third-person shooter
- Mode: Single-player

Minority Report: Everybody Runs is a 2002 third-person shooter beat 'em up video game based on the 2002 film Minority Report. It was developed for the PlayStation 2, GameCube, and Xbox by Treyarch, and for the Game Boy Advance by Torus Games, and published by Activision. A Microsoft Windows version of the game was also planned but was cancelled.

The game is a loose adaptation of the film, following the story of John Anderton investigating a conspiracy involving his future murder of Roy Verhagen, an original character created for the game, replacing Leo Crow from the film. Several of the film's cast were replaced for the game, with Clancy Brown and Quinton Flynn replacing Tom Cruise and Colin Farrell as Anderton and Danny Witwer, respectively.

The game received mixed to negative reviews from critics, who criticized the repetitive gameplay and bland visuals, but the physics, destructible environments and sound effects received some praise.

== Gameplay ==
Minority Report: Everybody Runs is a third-person shooter beat 'em up game with minor platforming elements that spans 40 levels. Its main selling point is the ragdoll physics engine, with highly exaggerated effects to enhance interaction with the environment. Enemies thrown against walls or railings will strike or fold over them in a semi-realistic fashion, and will often smash through breakable objects. The player can also use futuristic weapons, both those featured in the movie and new ones created for the game by Treyarch. There are also a few levels which incorporate the use of a jetpack, allowing Anderton to fly around the environment. Throughout the levels, players can find money that can be traded in at the Black Market for extra weapons, additional melee combos, extended ammo capacities, temporary upgrades like a melee damage booster, as well as armor to protect Anderton from damage, and extra health.

A major aspect connecting the video game to the movie is that, in the film, protagonist Anderton believes that he has been framed for a future murder and sets out to prove his innocence. In line with the film as well, Anderton never uses lethal force against criminals or the cops that chase him; all weapons either render the opposition unconscious or incapacitated.

== Plot ==
The game starts with PreCrime Captain John Anderton pursuing future murderer Andre Serena throughout a meat packing facility. Anderton bests Andre and fellow PreCrime officer Barry arrives to subject the latter to virtual reality (the preferred form of punishment).

Anderton arrives at PreCrime HQ in Washington, DC where he is greeted by FBI agents Danny Witwer, Ben Mosely, and Ken Nara. Witwer explains that he was sent by the Attorney General to overlook the operations of PreCrime. Barry alerts Anderton to a vision by the Precogs: John Anderton will be murdered by Nikki Jameson, a consultant of SOL Enterprises. Anderton, Barry, and Mosely arrive at SOL to apprehend her, but she escapes. Returning to HQ, the Precogs generate a new vision, revealing that he will murder Roy Verhagen, a man he had never met. Barry witnesses the vision and attempts to help John escape. As Anderton fights his way to escape PreCrime HQ, he confronts Mosely and soundly defeats him.

Anderton goes to the mall to find Rufus, a former criminal that runs a club. Back in his apartment, Barry informs him that the city has a bounty on him. He also tells Anderton that 2 out of the 3 Precogs have a report, with the last one's MIA, suspecting a glitch. Anderton has Barry send him info on Iris Hinemen, the woman who initiated the Precogs program. PreCrime officers arrive to arrest him, and he makes his way to the rooftops, where Witwer confronts him in a hovership.

As this happens, Verhagen talks with Nikki, revealed to be a contractor hired to kill Anderton. Anderton reaches the botanical gardens, and finds Iris in the greenhouse, where she tells Anderton that he has fallen upon a scenario known as a "minority report": The Precogs are never wrong with their visions, but, occasionally, disagree on the outcome. This is kept secret from PreCrime and the perpetrator, and erased from the system. Both Anderton and Iris agree that public knowledge of the minority report would shut PreCrime down. Iris instructs him to find the dissenting Precog and download the information needed to clear his name, at which point PreCrime arrives, and Anderton has to protect Iris and leave the gardens.

Anderton meets a black market doctor at the Pepper Hotel to change his eyes and bypass the city's optical scanners. After commotion occurs, Anderton leaves, witnessing a riot against PreCrime. He evades the riots, and runs into agent Nara, beating him in a shootout.

Anderton arrives at PreCrime HQ to find Barry, who reveals Verhagen is the leader of SOL Enterprises, a multimillion-dollar company specializing in robotics, and a major weapons dealer in the black market. Anderton frees Agatha, a Precog, and they make their way out of PreCrime HQ.

After some evasion, Anderton takes Agatha to Rufus, who decodes her visions, and tells him about Shinya Okawa, former employee of SOL. Agatha returns to PreCrime as Anderton goes to meet Okawa.

On a subway train a PreCrime officer notices Anderton. With help from civilians that fought against PreCrime, Anderton commandeers the subway train car and defeats Mosely again.

In the ruins of the Sprawl, Anderton sees ongoing riots. He finds Okawa inside his fortune cookie factory. After a heated discussion, Anderton retrieves Okawa's computer in exchange for Verhagen's location.

Anderton fights through a waste management facility which has a backdoor to Verhagen's lair. Nikki joins the fight; she is beaten by Anderton. Anderton pursues Verhagen as Witwer and two PreCrime officers arrive. As Verhagen attempts to escape, Anderton cuts him off and holds him at gunpoint. Verhagen begs for mercy, offering Anderton bribes, which he refuses, and a gunshot is heard as the screen fades to black. As it cuts back, Verhagen sees that Anderton deliberately missed the shot.

Anderton witnesses Verhagen's imprisonment firsthand. Content with the results, Anderton is reinstated into PreCrime.

== Development ==
Minority Report: Everybody Runs was announced in April 2002, before the theatrical release of the film. The console version was developed by Treyarch, who had recently finished work on the video game adaptation of that year's Spider-Man film. They would use the same engine for both games. However, the game does not use the likenesses of the actors from the movie, with John Anderton being voiced by Clancy Brown and having a generic character model. The game was released on November 19 to coincide with the film's home media release; a commercial for it can be seen in the game's extras menu.

The Game Boy Advance version was developed by Torus Games, and is an isometric shooter game.

== Reception ==
Reception

Aggregate score
Aggregator	Score			
Aggregator	GBA	GameCube	PS2	Xbox
Metacritic	54/100	53/100	50/100	54/100

Review scores
Publication	Score			
Publication	GBA	GameCube	PS2	Xbox
AllGame	2.5/5	N/A	N/A	N/A
Electronic Gaming Monthly	N/A	N/A	6/10	N/A
Eurogamer	N/A	N/A	3/10	N/A
Game Informer	N/A	6.75/10	6.75/10	6.75/10
GamePro	N/A	N/A	2.5/5	3.5/5
GameRevolution	N/A	D	D	D
GameSpot	4/10	4.1/10	4.1/10	4.1/10
GameSpy	N/A	1.5/5	1.5/5	1.5/5
GameZone	6.5/10	5/10	6/10	6/10
IGN	6/10	5.3/10	5.3/10	5.4/10
Nintendo Power	2.8/5	4.1/5	N/A	N/A
Official U.S. PlayStation Magazine	N/A	N/A	2.5/5	N/A
Official Xbox Magazine (US)	N/A	N/A	N/A	7.2/10
Entertainment Weekly	N/A	C	C	C
Maxim	N/A	6/10	6/10	6/10

Minority Report: Everybody Runs received "mixed" reviews on all platforms according to video game review aggregator Metacritic.

In a review of the console versions for GameSpot, Matthew Gallant was critical of the "shoehorning of the combat-oriented gameplay" into the licence, as well as a "number of odd gameplay decisions" made in the translation from film to game. Problems included the small enemy variety, limited sound effects and repetitive combat. IGN's Hilary Goldstein said that the game failed to capture the marvel of its movie counterpart and was critical of the level design which he called "fairly confined and uninteresting in design". On the other hand, he gave praise to some of the effects in the game, such as shotgun effects which he thought looked like they were "ripped straight from the movie."

AllGame's Scott Alan Marriott gave the Game Boy Advance version a 2 and half stars out of 5, saying that if nothing else, " developer Torus Games deserves credit for trying something different" and was complimentary of how the game avoided the "common problems" of licensed games on handheld systems. He found the game "surprisingly addictive" and liked the "look of the environments". However, Craig Harris of IGN found the handheld edition was held back by its the 'lock-on gameplay' which he described as "clunky". He found the system particularly frustrating when it randomly caused him to unintentionally kill a bystander due it seemingly targeting them randomly.
