= Pre-crime =

Term for crimes not yet committed

Pre-crime, also spelled precrime, is the idea that the occurrence of a crime can be anticipated before it happens. The term was coined by science fiction author Philip K. Dick, and is increasingly used in academic literature to describe and criticise the tendency in criminal justice systems to focus on crimes not yet committed. Pre-crime intervenes to punish, disrupt, incapacitate, or restrict those deemed to embody future crime threats. As a term, it embodies a temporal paradox, suggesting both that a crime has not yet occurred and that it is a foregone conclusion.

== Origins of the concept ==
George Orwell introduced a similar concept in his 1949 novel Nineteen Eighty-Four using the term "thoughtcrime" to describe illegal thoughts that held banned opinions about the ruling government or intentions to act against it. A large part of how it differs from pre-crime is in its absolute prohibition of anti-authority ideas and emotions, regardless of the consideration of any physical revolutionary acts; however, Orwell was describing behaviour he saw in governments of his day as well as extrapolating on that behaviour, and so his ideas were themselves rooted in real political history and current events.

In Philip K. Dick's 1956 science fiction short story "The Minority Report", PreCrime is the name of a criminal justice agency, the task of which is to identify and eliminate persons who will commit crimes in the future. The agency's work is based on the existence of "precog mutants", a trio of "vegetable-like" humans whose "every incoherent utterance" is analyzed by a punch card computer. As Anderton, the chief of the PreCrime agency, explains the advantages of this procedure, "in our society we have no major crimes ... but we do have a detention camp full of would-be criminals". He cautions about the basic legal drawback to pre-crime methodology, "We're taking in individuals who have broken no law." The concept was brought to wider public attention by Steven Spielberg's 2002 film Minority Report, loosely adapted from the story. The Japanese cyberpunk anime television series Psycho-Pass (2012–2013) had a similar concept.

== In criminological theory ==
Pre-crime in criminology dates back to the positivist school in the late 19th century, especially to Cesare Lombroso's idea that there are "born criminals", who can be recognized, even before they have committed any crime, on the basis of certain physical characteristics. Biological, psychological and sociological forms of criminological positivisms informed criminal policy in the early 20th century. For born criminals, criminal psychopaths, and dangerous habitual offenders, eliminatory penalties such as capital punishment, indefinite confinement, and castration were seen as appropriate. Similar ideas were advocated by the social defense movement and into the 1990s by what is seen and criticized as an emerging "new criminology", or "actuary justice". The new "pre-crime" or "security society" requires a radically new criminology.

== Testing for pre-delinquency ==
Richard Nixon's psychiatrist, Arnold Hutschnecker, suggested in a memorandum to the president to run mass tests of "pre-delinquency" and put those juveniles in "camps". Hutschnecker, a refugee from Nazi Germany and a vocal critic of Adolf Hitler at the time of his exodus, rejected the interpretation of the memorandum that he advocated concentration camps, "It was the term 'camp' that was distorted. My use of it dates back to when I came to the United States in 1936 and spent the summer as a doctor in a children's camp. It was that experience and the pastoral setting, as well as the activities, that prompted my use of the word 'camp.'"

== In criminal justice practice ==
The frontline of a modern criminal justice system is increasingly preoccupied with anticipating threats, and is the antithesis of the traditional criminal justice system's focus on past crimes. Traditionally, criminal justice and punishment presuppose evidence of a crime being committed. This time-honored principle is violated once punishment is meted out "for crimes never committed". An example of this trend in the first decade of the 21st century is nachträgliche Sicherungsverwahrung (retrospective security detention), which became an option in German criminal law in 2004. This "measure of security" can be decided upon at the end of a prison sentence on a purely predictive basis.

In France, a similarly predictive measure was introduced in 2008 as rétention de sûreté (security detention). The German measure was viewed as violating the European Convention on Human Rights by the European Court of Human Rights in 2009. As of 2014, the German law was still partly active in Germany and new legislation was planned for continuing the pre-crime law under the new name Therapieunterbringung (detention for therapy). A similar provision for indefinite administrative detention was found within the judicial system of Finland but was not enforced after the mid-1970s. Pre-crime is most obvious and advanced in the context of counter-terrorism, although it is argued that far from countering terrorism, pre-crime produces the futures it purports to prevent.

In 2020, the Tampa Bay Times compared the Pasco County Sheriff's Office pre-crime detection program to the film Minority Report, citing pervasive monitoring of suspects and repeated visits to their homes, schools, and places of employment. In 2025, The Guardian reported that the UK Ministry of Justice was developing a "murder prediction system". The existence of the project was discovered by the pressure group Statewatch, and some of its workings were uncovered through documents obtained by Freedom of Information requests. Statewatch stated that The Homicide Prediction Project uses police and government data to profile people with the aim of 'predicting' who is "at risk" of committing murder in future. The project began in January 2023 under Prime Minister Rishi Sunak.

== Developed techniques ==
Crime prediction software is criticised by academics and by privacy and civil liberties groups due to concerns about the lack of evidence for the technology's reliability and accuracy. Crime prediction algorithms often use racially skewed data in their analysis. This statistically leads law enforcement agencies to make decisions and predictions that unfairly target and label minority communities as at risk for criminal activity. A widely used criminal risk assessment tool called COMPAS (Correctional Offender Management Profiling for Alternative Sanctions) was developed in 1998. It was used by police and judges to predict the risk of recidivism amongst more than 1 million offenders. The software predicts the likelihood that a convicted criminal will reoffend within two years based upon data including 137 of the individual's physical features and past criminal records.

A 2018 study published in Science Advances by two researchers found that groups of randomly chosen people could predict whether a past criminal would be convicted of a future crime with about 67 percent accuracy, a rate that was extremely similar to COMPAS. Although COMPAS does not explicitly collect data regarding race, the study testing its accuracy on more than 7,000 individuals arrested in Broward County, Florida, showed substantial racial disparities in the software's predictions. The results of the study showed that Black defendants who did not reoffend after their sentence were incorrectly predicted by COMPAS software to recidivate at a rate of 44.9%, as opposed to white defendants who were incorrectly predicted to reoffend at a rate of 23.5%. In addition, white defendants were incorrectly predicted to not be at risk of recidivism at a rate of 47.7%, as opposed to their Black counterparts who were incorrectly predicted to not reoffend at a rate of 28%. The study concluded that the COMPAS software appeared to overpredict recidivism risk towards Black individuals while underpredicting recidivism risk towards their white counterparts.

== See also ==
- ATF fictional sting operations
- Habeas corpus
- Incapacitation (penology)
- Inchoate offense
- Predictive policing
- Presumption of guilt
- Preventive detention
- Preventive state
- Thoughtcrime
- Total Information Awareness
