= The Minority Report =

1956 science fiction novella by Philip K. Dick

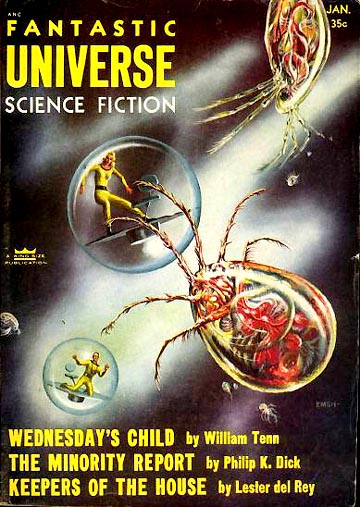
"The Minority Report" was originally published in Fantastic Universe in 1956.

"The Minority Report" is a 1956 science fiction novelette by American writer Philip K. Dick, first published in Fantastic Universe. In a future society, three mutants foresee all crime before it occurs. Plugged into a great machine, these "precogs" allow a division of the police called Precrime to arrest suspects before they can commit any actual crimes. When the head of Precrime, John Anderton, is himself predicted to murder a man whom he has never heard of, Anderton is convinced a great conspiracy is afoot.

The story reflects many of Philip K. Dick's personal anxieties, particularly questioning the relationship between authoritarianism and individual autonomy. Like many stories dealing with knowledge of future events, "The Minority Report" questions the existence of free will. The title refers to the dissenting opinion of one of the precogs.

In 2002, the story was adapted into a film directed by Steven Spielberg, which starred Tom Cruise, Colin Farrell, Samantha Morton, and Max von Sydow. Spielberg's film was followed by a series of the same name, which debuted on the Fox Broadcasting Company on September 21, 2015.

== Synopsis ==
In a near-future version of the United States, John Aleister Anderton is the aging creator and head police commissioner of the Precrime Division, in which three mutant humans called "precogs" predict all crimes before they occur. While showing his new second-in-command Ed Witwer around the premises, Anderton is shocked to receive a report that he, Anderton, is predicted to murder a man within the coming week. Believing Witwer has framed him in order to steal his job, Anderton tells his much younger wife Lisa, who is a fellow police official. Becoming paranoid, he soon suspects that she and Witwer may be joined in a conspiracy against him.

Knowing that a copy of the report is automatically sent to the Army as a safeguard, Anderton rushes home. He is suddenly abducted and brought before Leopold Kaplan, a retired general and Anderton's expected murder victim, although the two have never met. Kaplan hears Anderton's claims of ignorance, but still moves to hand him over to police custody. However, a mysterious man named Fleming crashes Anderton's transport vehicle and, claiming that Anderton is being framed by Witwer, allows him to escape.

Anderton contacts a friend at Precrime to inquire about a "minority report": a type of dissenting opinion in which one of the three precogs' predictions conflicts with those of the other two. Indeed, he learns that a minority report exists: one of the precogs predicted that Anderton would refrain from murdering Kaplan once he became aware of the situation. Anderton must now decide whether to remain silent and turn himself in, or speak up about the minority report and thus reveal a flaw that could discredit the entire Precrime system.

Lisa confronts Anderton, claiming that no conspiracy is taking place. She attempts to help him escape using a police helicopter, but Fleming ambushes and attacks her. Anderton subdues Fleming, revealing that the latter is one of Kaplan's men. Anderton realizes that his escape and "framing" was staged by the military. By preventing Anderton from murdering Kaplan, while also preventing Anderton from being arrested, Kaplan hopes to destroy Precrime's credibility by showing that arrested "criminals" may not always become guilty of the crimes they are predicted to commit. Anderton finally reads each of the precog reports, then goes to an Army rally where Kaplan is moments away from reading aloud Anderton's minority report to the public. Before Kaplan is able to do so, Anderton shoots and kills him.

Anderton is arrested and both he and Lisa, as his accomplice, are scheduled for penal transportation to another planet. Before they leave Earth, Anderton explains to Witwer his reasoning for shooting Kaplan. After obtaining the three precog reports, he discovered that each of them predicted a different outcome. He further realized that the reports had not been generated simultaneously, and that each had been affected by his knowledge of all preceding ones. The first indicated that he would kill Kaplan in order to prevent Precrime from being discredited and shut down; the second predicted that, after reading the first, he would decide to not kill Kaplan. According to the third report, Kaplan had planned to discredit Precrime in order to enact a state of emergency and martial law, resulting in a military coup in which the Army would replace Precrime. Wanting to preserve the status quo, Anderton decided to fulfill the prediction and assassinate Kaplan rather than letting his own innocence destroy the system he helped create. The entire situation thus became a self-fulfilling prophecy. As Anderton and Lisa are about to be transported, Anderton warns Witwer, who has nervously inherited Anderton's job, that the same predicament could happen to him at any time.

== Precrime ==
Precrime is a predictive policing system dedicated to apprehending and detaining people before they have the opportunity to commit a given crime. At the time of the story, it has been operating for thirty years. This method has replaced the traditional system of discovering a crime and its perpetrator after the crime has already been committed, then issuing punishment after the fact. As Witwer says early on in the story, "punishment was never much of a deterrent and could scarcely have afforded comfort to a victim already dead". Unlike the film adaptation, the story version of Precrime does not deal solely with cases of murder, but all crimes. As Commissioner John A. Anderton (the founder of Precrime) states, "Precrime has cut down felonies by 99.8%."

Three mutants, known as precogs, have precognitive abilities they can use to see up to two weeks into the future. The precogs are strapped into machines, nonsensically babbling as a computer listens and converts this gibberish into predictions of the future. This information is transcribed onto conventional punched cards that are ejected into various coded slots. These cards appear simultaneously at Precrime and the army headquarters to prevent systemic corruption.

=== Precogs ===
Precogs are mutants, identified talents further developed in a government-operated training school—for example, one precog was initially diagnosed as "a hydro-cephalic idiot" but the precog talent was found under layers of damaged brain tissue. The precogs are kept in rigid position by metal bands, clamps and wiring, strapping them into special high-backed chairs. Their physical needs are taken care of automatically and Anderton claims that they have no spiritual needs. Their physical appearance is distorted from an ordinary human, with enlarged heads and wasted bodies. Precogs are "deformed" and "retarded" as "the talent absorbs everything"; "the esp-lobe shrivels the balance of the frontal area". They do not understand their predictions; only through technological and mechanical aid can their nonsense be unraveled. The data produced does not always pertain to crime or murder, but this information is then passed on to other groups of people who use the precog necessities to create other future necessities.

=== Majority and minority reports ===
Each of the three precogs generates its own report or prediction. The reports of all the precogs are analyzed by a computer and, if these reports differ from one another, the computer identifies the two reports with the greatest overlap and produces a "majority report", taking this as the accurate prediction of the future. But the existence of majority reports implies the existence of a "minority report". In the story, Precrime Police Commissioner John A. Anderton believes that the prediction that he will commit a murder has been generated as a majority report. He sets out to find the minority report, which would give him an alternate future. As Anderton finds out, sometimes all three reports differ quite significantly, and there may be no majority report, even though two reports may have had enough in common for the computer to link them as such. In the storyline, all of the reports about Anderton differ because they predict events occurring sequentially, and thus each is a minority report. Anderton's situation is explained as unique, because he, as Police Commissioner, received notice of the precogs' predictions, allowing him to change his mind and invalidate earlier precog predictions.

=== Multiple time paths ===
The existence of three apparent minority reports suggests the possibility of three future time paths, all existing simultaneously, any of which an individual could choose to follow or be sent along following an enticement (as in Anderton's being told he was going to murder an unknown man). In this way, the time-paths overlap, and the future of one is able to affect the past of another. It is in this way that the story weaves a complicated web of crossing time paths and makes a linear journey for Anderton harder to identify. This idea of multiple futures lets the precogs of Precrime be of benefit—because if only one time-path existed, the predictions of the precogs would be worthless since the future would be unalterable. Precrime is based on the notion that once one unpleasant future pathway is identified, an alternative, better one can be created with the arrest of the potential perpetrator.

=== Police Commissioner John A. Anderton ===
John A. Anderton is the protagonist of The Minority Report. At first, he is highly insecure, suspicious of those closest to him—his wife, his assistant Witwer. He has complete faith in the Precrime system and its authority over individuals and their freedom of choice. The poor living condition of the precogs and the imprisonment of would-be criminals are necessary consequences for the greater good of a safe society. When his own autonomy comes under attack, Anderton retains this faith and convinces himself that the system has somehow been corrupted. Anderton struggles to find an appropriate balance between Precrime authority and individual liberty. Ultimately, Anderton decides to kill Leopold Kaplan to affirm the majority report and thereby preserve the validity of the Precrime system.

== Media adaptation ==
- The 2002 film Minority Report, directed by Steven Spielberg and with Tom Cruise as main actor, was based on the story.
- A video game, Minority Report: Everybody Runs, published in 2002 by Activision, was based on the film.
- A sequel television series, more than a decade after the events of the movie and also titled Minority Report, premiered on September 21, 2015, on Fox
- In September 2023, it was announced that David Haig was adapting the story for the stage, to premiere at the Lyric Hammersmith the following spring.

=== Differences between short story and film ===
- While the film uses the backdrop of Washington, D.C., Baltimore and Northern Virginia, the location of the original story is New York City.
- In the story, John Anderton is a 50-year-old balding, out-of-shape police officer who created Precrime, while in the movie Anderton is in his late 30s, handsome, drug addict, athletic, with a full head of hair who joined Precrime after his son's kidnapping. Instead, a man named Lamar Burgess creates Precrime.
- Anderton's wife in the short story is named Lisa, while his ex-wife in the film is named Lara.
- The precogs were originally named Mike, Donna, and Jerry, and were deformed and intellectually disabled. In the adaptation, they are called Agatha, Dashiell, and Arthur—after crime writers Agatha Christie, Dashiell Hammett, and Arthur Conan Doyle—children of drug addicts whose mutations led them to dream of future murders, which are captured by machines. They are "deified" by the Precrime officers, and are implied to be intelligent (Agatha guides Anderton successfully through a crowded mall while being pursued by Precrime, and the trio are seen reading large piles of books at the end of the film). In the end of the movie they retire to a rural cottage where they continue their lives in freedom and peace.
- In the short story, the precogs can see other crimes, not just murder. In the movie, the precogs can only clearly see murder.
- In the short story, Anderton's future victim is General Leopold Kaplan, who wants to discredit Precrime in order to replace this police force with a military authority. At the end of the story, Anderton kills him to prevent the destruction of Precrime. In the movie, Anderton is supposed to kill someone named Leo Crow, but later finds out Crow is just part of a set up to prevent Anderton from discovering a different murder that his superior, Lamar Burgess, committed years ago. At the end of the film, Anderton confronts Burgess, who is about to kill Anderton, but who commits suicide instead, using the small revolver that he has just been presented with.
- In the short story, Anderton seeks the precogs to hear their "minority reports". In the movie, Anderton kidnaps a precog in order to discover his own "minority report" and extract the information for a mysterious crime.
- In the film, a major plot point was that there was no minority report. The story ends with Anderton describing how the minority report was based on his knowledge of the other two reports.
- The short story ends with Anderton and Lisa exiled to a space colony after Kaplan's murder. The movie finishes with John and Lara reunited after the conspiracy's resolution, expecting a second child.

== See also ==
- Cyberpunk
- Precrime
- "Law and Oracle" (2011), an episode of the show Futurama in which central character Fry joins a police division heavily inspired by both the novella and film.
- "All the Troubles of the World" (1958), an Asimov short story in which society accepts the automatic prediction of crime
- Psycho-Pass (2012), an anime series with a similar premise
