= Incapacitation (penology) =

Punishment strategy aimed at preventing future crimes by restricting offenders' freedom

Incapacitation in the context of criminal sentencing philosophy is one of the functions of punishment. It involves capital punishment, sending an offender to prison, or possibly restricting their freedom in the community, to protect society and prevent that person from committing further crimes. Incarceration, as the primary mechanism for incapacitation, is also used in an effort to deter future offending.

== Purpose ==
Incapacitation is used primarily to protect the public from offenders who are seen as sufficiently dangerous that they need to be removed from society for a period of time, which is achieved usually by sending the offender to prison (incarceration). In most countries, prison sentences are applied for a range of different crimes but are almost certain to be applied to those who commit serious assaults, murder or sex crimes.

However, the risk that offenders pose to society is largely a matter of perception. As a result, how the justice system in one country treats a particular offence will differ considerably from the level of sanction imposed for the same crime in another country. This means that some countries, like the United States, use incarceration to incapacitate offenders at much higher rates than other countries. Rates of imprisonment vary from over 650 inmates per 100,000 of population in the United States, to Guinea-Bissau which locks up only 10 people per 100,000.

== Methods ==
=== Incarceration ===
Imprisonment incapacitates prisoners by physically removing them from the society against which they are deemed to have offended or potentially may endanger. Long term imprisonment with the intention to incapacitate is often used by criminal justice systems against habitual criminals who recidivate (relapse). Therefore, incapacitation focuses on removing the ability of the offenders to commit future crimes by use of imprisonment rather than focusing on rehabilitation or prevention. Within the prison system itself, inmate security classifications are used to classify prisoners based on risk level and place them in an environment that will adequately incapacitate them from causing trouble.

=== Community-based sentences ===
Incarceration is not the only means of incapacitation; supervision can also sometimes serve that purpose. Although parole and probation have long been justified as means of reintegrating offenders into the community, the trend has been for them to be increasingly perceived as cost-effective ways of imposing long-term management on the dangerous. In the federal system, the PROTECT Act, for example, allowed for lifetime federal supervised release to be imposed on sex offenders, the implication being that they will never be rehabilitated to a level of risk comparable to that of the general population. From a standpoint of seeking to incapacitate those who pose a threat to the public, if a high-risk offender goes back to prison for a non-criminal violation of his conditions of release, this is actually a success rather than a failure, because he was incapacitated before he could commit another crime and get caught for it.

Unlike deterrence, rehabilitation, or restitution, incapacitation alters neither the offender nor their social context, but simply rearranges the distribution of offenders in society in such a way as to delay their resumption of crime, and thereby decrease the crime rate. According to Malcolm M. Feeley, "Incapacitation then is to penology what arbitrage is to investments, a method of capitalizing on minute displacements in time; and like arbitrage it has a diminished relationship to the normative goal of enhancing the value of its objects." Much as an investor analyzes the risk profiles of various investment opportunities so as to make choices that will have the best return, society seeks to identify high-risk offenders and invest in their long-term incarceration.

== Scholarship ==
In his 2004 article, Steven Levitt attributes part of the decline in the crime rate seen beginning in the mid-1990s to the inability of inmates to recidivate as sentences for crimes, especially for repeat offenders, had been greatly increased. Examples of these laws include back-to-back life sentences, three-strikes sentencing, and other habitual offender laws. In the United States, 18 U.S.C. § 3553 states that one of the purposes of criminal sentencing is to "protect the public from further crimes of the defendant". Quite simply, those incarcerated cannot commit further crimes against society.

Most of the justification for the continued high levels of those in prison in the United States is due to the incapacitation effect. In the 1970s, the strong emphasis on rehabilitation that had existed since the turn of the century gave way first to a focus on equality and fairness in sentencing, and then to an increased focus on incapacitation, deterrence and restraint strategies of crime prevention.

However, the increase in the number of persons incarcerated has greatly increased due to the implementation of this concept. For the 30 years prior to 1974, the average number or persons incarcerated was 103 per 100,000. This number had climbed to 600 per 100,000 by 1995. As of 2013 the figure was 716 per 100,000.

The effect of incapacitation often has the unintended effect of incarceration of inmates' families.

MacKenzie found that incapacitating offenders who continue to commit crimes at high rates is effective, it works best as a part of a multi-tiered approach. In addition, the effects of incarceration on the families and children of the inmate may be increasing the likelihood of future criminal activities.

In an Australian study, incapacitation was the second most popular predominant sentencing purpose for judges, while for jurors, it was only the fifth ranking purpose.

== Examples ==
=== United States ===
The crime rate in the United States unexpectedly fell sharply in the 1990s, in almost all demographic and geographic areas, and a portion of the drop has been attributed to the incapacitation effect. Beginning in the mid-1990s, sentences began to lengthen due to habitual felon statutes being passed in many states as well as changes in sentencing statutes which reduced the credit inmates could amass to reduce the amount of time they were held in prison.

Recidivism remains a problem in the United States, where according to a 2005 Bureau of Justice Statistics rates of recidivism average around 67.5%, although this number is heavily dependent on the type of crime when applied to specific cases. The rate of recidivism has increased since the 1990s.

However, the cost to incarcerate inmates continues to rise, which has led states to release inmates before the end of their assigned term, such as in North Carolina's advanced supervisory release program. The balance between the cost of incarceration and the reduction in crime due to the incapacitation effect remains difficult to make decisions on and problematic for politicians.

In 2015, a similar problem was noted in North Carolina, where a court-ordered reduction in student suspensions appears to be linked in an increase in on-campus crime.

=== Australia ===
A similar drop in crime was noted in Australia, where the marked increase in the prison population was termed a "very blunt instrument of crime control but it is an important instrument, nonetheless." The paper further states that achieving a 10 percent reduction in the 2006 burglary rate an increase imprisonment of 34 percent would be needed. Doing so would increase cost by an additional $26 million per year. Further research was recommended as to the cost-effectiveness of this method of controlling crime.

=== Elsewhere ===
Cutting off a hand of a thief is also an example; this acts to prevent further thefts in a drastic manner, in addition to it having a perceived deterrent effect on others.

== Controversies ==
One criticism of incapacitation is that it focuses on predictions of dangerousness rather than on the rights of the accused. For example, incapacitation theory might advocate prolonged pretrial detention of a defendant who has not yet been proven guilty. His guilt or innocence of the particular crime he is charged with might have limited relevance to the issue of whether his pretrial detention would serve the goal of protecting the public from future crimes he might commit. The legitimacy of detaining the accused pursuant to the Bail Reform Act of 1984 was upheld in United States v. Salerno. A counter-argument is that many people who commit crimes are never caught, so when offenders are caught, sentencing policy should severely disable any group that is highly likely to re-offend.

Another criticism of incapacitation is that, if a prisoner is to be eventually released from prison, then his incarceration could be criminogenic, since offenders are more likely to commit a crime after release from prison than previous to incarceration. Increased incarceration might make it increasingly difficult for the inmate to keep his family intact, find work, and avoid associating with other criminals once he is released, all of which may increase the likelihood of re-offending.

Incapacitation theories have been criticized for punishing offenders more harshly than would be justified by their culpability and blameworthiness for the offense of conviction. They also may not adequately take into account offenders' potential for rehabilitation. For example, Virginia's sentencing guidelines penalized offenders for being younger than twenty, unmarried, unemployed, or male, even though traditionally youth had been regarded as a mitigating rather than an aggravating circumstance. The goal of determinate sentencing schemes such as federal sentencing guidelines in mitigating sentencing disparities could be thwarted by incapacitation-based schemes that take into account certain factors, such as sex or race, that correlate to recidivism.

Another critique of incapacitation is that small increases in prison sentences merely delay crimes rather than preventing them.

Crewe however, has pointed out that for incapacitation of an offender to work, it must be the case that the offender would have committed a crime had they not been restricted in this way. Should the putative offender not be going to commit further crimes, then they have not been incapacitated. The more heinous crimes such as murders have the lowest levels of recidivism and hence are the least likely offences to be subject to incapacitative effects. Antisocial behaviour and the like display high levels of recidivism and hence are the kind of crimes most susceptible to incapacitative effects. It is shown by life-course studies that long sentences for burglaries amongst offenders in their late teens and early twenties fail to incapacitate when the natural reduction in offending due to ageing is taken into account: the longer the sentence, in these cases, the less the incapacitative effect.

== See also ==
- Penology
- Pre-crime – criminal justice system approaches to crimes not yet committed
- Psychopathy
- Recidivism
