= Predictive policing =

Use of predictive analytics to direct policing

Predictive policing is the usage of mathematics, predictive analytics, and other analytical techniques in law enforcement to identify potential criminal activity.

A report published by the RAND Corporation identified four general categories predictive policing methods fall into: methods for predicting crimes, methods for predicting offenders, methods for predicting perpetrators' identities, and methods for predicting victims of crime. Predictive policing has received significant scrutiny throughout the 2010s and 2020s, especially relating to concerns of the practice disproportionately affecting communities of color due to selection bias.

== Methodology ==
Predictive policing uses data on the times, locations and nature of past crimes to provide advice to police strategists concerning where, and at what times, police patrols should patrol, or maintain a presence. This type of policing detects patterns in crime reports to make educated guesses of where crime is likely to spike. Algorithms are produced by taking into account past statistics, to process large amounts of data. Choices are made regarding the types of data to collect, the duration and frequency of data collection and update, the types of analytical tools to employ, the dependent variables to focus on, the types of police operations to employ, how and when to evaluate the success of interventions, and what changes in interventions should be implemented following the evaluation. Algorithms are used to speed up the process of predictive policing. From the suggestions the algorithm generates, a prevention strategy is devised, which typically involves sending one or more officers to the estimated time and place of the crime.

Police may also use data accumulated on shootings and the sounds of gunfire to identify locations of shootings.

== History ==
=== Iraq ===
At the conclusion of intense combat operations in April 2003, Improvised Explosive Devices (IEDs) were dispersed throughout Iraq's streets. These devices were deployed to monitor and counteract U.S. military activities using predictive policing tactics. However, the extensive areas covered by these IEDs made it impractical for Iraqi forces to respond to every American presence within the region. This challenge led to the concept of Actionable Hot Spots—zones experiencing high levels of activity yet too vast for effective control. This situation presented difficulties for the Iraqi military in selecting optimal locations for surveillance, sniper placements, and route patrols along areas monitored by IEDs.

=== China ===
The roots of predictive policing can be traced to the policy approach of social governance, in which leader of the Chinese Communist Party Xi Jinping announced at a security conference in 2016 is the Chinese regime's agenda to promote a harmonious and prosperous country through an extensive use of information systems. A common instance of social governance is the development of the social credit system, where big data is used to digitize identities and quantify trustworthiness. There is no other comparably comprehensive and institutionalized system of citizen assessment in the West.

The increase in collecting and assessing aggregate public and private information by China's police force to analyze past crime and forecast future criminal activity is part of the government's mission to promote social stability by converting intelligence-led policing (i.e. effectively using information) into informatization (i.e. using information technologies) of policing. The increase in employment of big data through the police geographical information system (PGIS) is within China's promise to better coordinate information resources across departments and regions to transform analysis of past crime patterns and trends into automated prevention and suppression of crime. PGIS was first introduced in 1970s and was originally used for internal government management and research institutions for city surveying and planning. Since the mid-1990s PGIS has been introduced into the Chinese public security industry to empower law enforcement by promoting police collaboration and resource sharing. The current applications of PGIS are still contained within the stages of public map services, spatial queries, and hot spot mapping. Its application in crime trajectory analysis and prediction is still in the exploratory stage; however, the promotion of informatization of policing has encouraged cloud-based upgrades to PGIS design, fusion of multi-source spatiotemporal data, and developments to police spatiotemporal big data analysis and visualization.

Although there is no nationwide police prediction program in China, local projects between 2015 and 2018 have also been undertaken in regions such as Zhejiang, Guangdong, Suzhou, and Xinjiang, that are either advertised as or are building blocks towards a predictive policing system.

Zhejiang and Guangdong had established prediction and prevention of telecommunication fraud through the real-time collection and surveillance of suspicious online or telecommunication activities and the collaboration with private companies such as the Alibaba Group for the identification of potential suspects. The predictive policing and crime prevention operation involves forewarning to specific victims, with 9,120 warning calls being made in 2018 by the Zhongshan police force along with direct interception of over 13,000 telephone calls and over 30,000 text messages in 2017.

Substance-related crime is also investigated in Guangdong, specifically the Zhongshan police force who were the first city in 2017 to utilize wastewater analysis and data models that included water and electricity usage to locate hotspots for drug crime. This method led to the arrest of 341 suspects in 45 different criminal investigations by 2019.

In China, Suzhou Police Bureau has adopted predictive policing since 2013. During 2015–2018, several cities in China have adopted predictive policing. China has used predictive policing to identify and target people to be sent to Xinjiang re-education camps.

The integrated joint operations platform (IJOP) predictive policing system is operated by the Central Political and Legal Affairs Commission.

=== Europe ===
In Europe there has been significant pushback against predictive policing and the broader use of artificial intelligence in policing on both a national and European Union level.

The Danish POL-INTEL project has been operational since 2017 and is based on the Gotham system from Palantir Technologies. The Gotham system has also been used by German state police and Europol.

Predictive policing has been used in the Netherlands.

=== United States ===
In the United States, the practice of predictive policing has been implemented by police departments in several states such as California, Washington, South Carolina, Alabama, Arizona, Tennessee, New York, and Illinois. Predictive policing has also been used by the Border Patrol to identify and detain drivers with driving patterns and financial activity patterns deemed suspicious.

In New York, the NYPD has begun implementing a new crime tracking program called Patternizr. The goal of the Patternizr was to help aid police officers in identifying commonalities in crimes committed by the same offenders or same group of offenders. The program generates the possible "pattern" of different crimes. The officer then has to manually search through the possible patterns to see if the generated crimes are related to the current suspect. If the crimes do match, the officer will launch a deeper investigation into the pattern of crimes.

The city of Chicago uses data blended from population mapping crime statistics to improve monitoring and identify patterns.

=== India ===
In India, various state police forces have adopted AI technologies to enhance their law enforcement capabilities. For instance, the Maharashtra Police have launched Maharashtra Advanced Research and Vigilance for Enhanced Law Enforcement (MARVEL), the country's first state-level police AI system, to improve crime prediction and detection. Additionally, the Uttar Pradesh Police utilize the AI-powered mobile application 'Trinetra' for facial recognition and criminal tracking.

=== Colombia ===
The Colombian National Police has used a crime-analysis platform originally known as XCrime and later renamed IAPOL. The system uses historical police records to generate weekly heat maps intended to indicate where and when particular types of crime are more likely to occur and to support decisions about patrol deployment.

The classification of the system as predictive has been questioned. Researchers consulted by Cerosetenta argued that part of the system's heat-map methodology summarizes historical crime concentrations rather than generating new predictions, while Colombian police documents have described the platform both as a predictive model and as a recommendation system.

== Concerns ==
Predictive policing faces extensive criticism for its low reliability, high cost, and its potential to reproduce existing prejudices. Predictive policing relies on human input to construct patterns, and flawed data can lead to biased and possibly racist results. Though data is claimed to be unbiased, communities of color and low income are the most targeted. Furthermore, some crime remains unreported, making the data vulnerable to selection bias, leading to inaccuracies.

In a 2016 study published in Significance, Kristian Lum and William Isaac applied the PredPol algorithm to drug crime data from Oakland, California, and reported that the model directed police disproportionately to neighborhoods with higher proportions of Black and low-income residents, while public health survey data showed that drug use was more evenly distributed across the city. Lum and Isaac attributed this disparity to biases that exist within the underlying arrest data, rather than the actual algorithm itself. Researchers in algorithmic fairness have described this dynamic as a feedback loop, and Barocas, Hardt, and Narayanan have argued that effects of feedback loops are difficult to address with technical changes alone; the complications arise from an underlying issue with training data rather than the models themselves.

Mathematical analysis shows that even with perfectly unbiased data, neighborhoods subjected to higher surveillance rates will experience exponentially more false alerts—not because of differing crime rates, but because of how probabilities compound at scale. A neighborhood monitored four times as intensively can see over twenty times more false flags. Such systems also hit critical thresholds beyond which false alerts become essentially certain. This suggests that differential impact on minority communities may be structurally inevitable as a matter of mathematics, not fixable through better algorithms or cleaner data.

In 2020, following protests against police brutality, a group of mathematicians published a letter in Notices of the American Mathematical Society urging colleagues to stop work on predictive policing. Over 1,500 other mathematicians joined the proposed boycott.

Some applications of predictive policing have targeted minority neighborhoods and lack feedback loops.

Several cities throughout the United States have enacted legislation to restrict the use of predictive policing technologies and other "invasive" intelligence-gathering techniques within their jurisdictions. Following the introduction of predictive policing as a crime reduction strategy, via the results of an algorithm created through the use of the software PredPol, the city of Santa Cruz, California experienced a decline in the number of burglaries reaching almost 20% in the first six months the program was in place. Despite this, in late June 2020 in the aftermath of the murder of George Floyd in Minneapolis, Minnesota along with a growing call for increased accountability amongst police departments, the Santa Cruz City Council voted in favor of a complete ban on the use of predictive policing technology.

Some scholars argue that predictive policing is much better at processing information without human bias, thereby preventing police officers from acting out of prejudice, or even distraction, in order to allocate police resources more efficiently and equitably. However, in this argument there is no concrete evidence that these initiatives improve community safety, and numerous advocacy groups and legal challenges have called attention to the dangers of predictive policing in terms of reproduction of biases, civil rights violations, and lack of transparency.

A New York University study that examined 13 U.S. jurisdictions found that predictive policing systems increased existing discriminatory law enforcement practices. An October 2023 investigation by The Markup found that crime predictions generate by Geolitica's PredPol algorithm for the Plainfield, New Jersey Police Department had an accuracy rate of less than 0.5%. A Brennan Center for Justice report noted that Los Angeles and Chicago ended what had once been highly praised programs when they were found to be ineffective over time.

Critics say that predictive policing discriminates against people of color and economically alienated groups. Arrest data, particularly for drug and other crimes, can be influenced by racial bias in police officer's choices about whom to investigate. Data analytics algorithms also may predict a higher incidence of crime in minority communities than actually exists. Police then focus on those communities, adding data that reinforces their status as hot spots for crime.

Critics have also raised concerns about the risk of the data being stolen after it has been collected. This requires departments to comply with regulations for protecting sensitive information to avoid database breaches or theft.

Moish Kutnowski writing for the Journal for Community, Safety, and Well-Being in 2017 wrote, "Predictive policing is an extension of existing tools that our brains naturally adhere to in pattern recognition. However, the danger of using a new tool that is not well understood, does not develop past existing social problems, and reinforces embedded negative stereotypes rather than pushing past them, is a strong indicator that we as a society are using it the wrong way."

== Regulation ==
=== European Union ===
In the European Union, Article 5(1)(d) of the Artificial Intelligence Act, which became enforceable on 2 February 2025, prohibits the marketing, deployment, or use of AI systems with the intent to predict the risk of an individual committing a criminal offense solely based on biometric profiling without any human assessment of verifiable facts. This is enforced by fines of up to €35 million or 7% of the company's total annual worldwide turnover, whichever is higher.

== See also ==
- Carding (police policy)
- Crime analysis
- Crime hotspots
- Jurimetrics
- Pre-crime
- Preventive state
- Quantitative methods in criminology
- Racial profiling
