= Minority Report =

2002 American film by Steven Spielberg

- Theatrical release poster
- Directed by: Steven Spielberg
- Screenplay by: Scott Frank; Jon Cohen
- Based on: "The Minority Report" by Philip K. Dick
- Produced by: Gerald R. Molen; Bonnie Curtis; Walter F. Parkes; Jan de Bont
- Starring: Tom Cruise; Colin Farrell; Samantha Morton; Max von Sydow
- Cinematography: Janusz Kamiński
- Edited by: Michael Kahn
- Music by: John Williams
- Production companies: 20th Century Fox; DreamWorks Pictures; Cruise/Wagner Productions; Amblin Entertainment; Blue Tulip Productions
- Distributed by: 20th Century Fox (Note: Distribution of Minority Report for all media was split between 20th Century Fox and DreamWorks Pictures. While 20th Century Fox handled worldwide theatrical and international home video distribution rights, DreamWorks handled worldwide television and domestic home video distribution rights to the film.)
- Release dates: June 17, 2002 (Ziegfeld Theatre); June 21, 2002 (United States)
- Running time: 145 minutes
- Country: United States
- Language: English
- Budget: $102 million
- Box office: $358.4 million

Minority Report is a 2002 American cyberpunk thriller film directed by Steven Spielberg and written by Scott Frank and Jon Cohen. It stars Tom Cruise, Colin Farrell, Samantha Morton and Max von Sydow. Loosely based on Philip K. Dick's 1956 novella "The Minority Report", the film takes place in 2054 in the Washington metropolitan area, where a specialized "precrime" police department apprehends would-be criminals with the use of foreknowledge provided by psychics called "precogs". Minority Report combines elements of the action, science fiction, tech noir, thriller, and whodunit genres. It is also a traditional chase film, in which the protagonist becomes a fugitive after being accused of a crime he did not commit.

The film was first optioned in 1992 as a sequel to another Dick adaptation, Total Recall (1990), with Arnold Schwarzenegger set to reprise his role. When Carolco Pictures filed for bankruptcy, the film was reworked into a standalone project. Its development started in 1997 after Cohen's script reached Spielberg and Cruise. Production suffered multiple delays due to Spielberg's work on A.I. and Cruise's work on Mission: Impossible 2, both of which ran over schedule.

Spielberg consulted scientists in an attempt to present a more plausible future world than those depicted in other science fiction films, and some of the film's portrayed technology has proven prescient. Minority Report was produced by 20th Century Fox, DreamWorks Pictures, Cruise/Wagner Productions, Amblin Entertainment, and Blue Tulip Productions. (Note: Attributed to multiple references:) 20th Century Fox and DreamWorks shared distribution duties.

The high-profile collaboration between Spielberg and Cruise made Minority Report one of 2002's most anticipated films. It received positive reviews from critics and was a commercial success, becoming the year's 10th most successful film worldwide. It grossed over $358 million on a budget of $102 million. It was nominated for the Academy Award for Best Sound Editing and won four Saturn Awards (Best Science Fiction Film, Best Direction, Best Writing, and Best Supporting Actress) from 11 nominations. It has since been included in lists of the greatest science fiction films of all time. (Note: Attributed to multiple references:) The film spawned a tie-in video game in 2002 and a single-season television series in 2015.

== Plot ==
In 2054, a "Precrime" pilot program is running in Washington, D.C. in the United States. Three clairvoyant individuals known as "precognitives" or "precogs" receive psychic visions about imminent homicides. Police detectives use information from the visions to apprehend would-be perpetrators before they can commit a crime. Those arrested are put into a coma and imprisoned indefinitely. Although Precrime has eliminated nearly all premeditated murders during its six-year existence, impulsive killings are still attempted, giving the police only a short time to act.

Precrime chief John Anderton's six-year-old son Sean was abducted in a public swimming pool and presumably killed several months before the program's introduction. He is addicted to a drug called neuroin, and he and his wife Lara have separated. Department of Justice agent Danny Witwer audits Precrime to uncover flaws. Anderton watches as one of the precogs, Agatha, has a flashback of a woman drowning. He learns from the prison warden that the intended victim, Anne Lively, went missing shortly after her murder was prevented; he also discovers that Agatha's vision of the crime is not on file. Soon afterward, the precogs predict that Anderton will kill a man named Leo Crow, whom he has never met. Anderton flees, prompting Witwer to begin a manhunt.

Anderton visits Dr. Iris Hineman, a geneticist whose research led to the creation of Precrime. She reveals that the precogs' abilities were acquired in utero from their neuroin-addicted mothers. She also explains that one precog occasionally sees a different future vision from the others, which is known as a "minority report". The minority reports are purged from the record to maintain the precogs' reputation of infallibility, so if Anderton has a minority report, he will have to find Agatha, the precog with the strongest abilities.

After undergoing black market eye transplant surgery to evade retinal scanners, Anderton returns to Precrime. He kidnaps Agatha, which shuts down the group-mind generated by the three precogs. With the assistance of a hacker, Anderton searches Agatha's memories but fails to find a minority report for Crow's murder. However, he finds and downloads her memories of Lively's death. Pursued by Precrime officers, Anderton and Agatha track Crow to a hotel room and find photos of many children, including Sean. Crow confesses to killing Sean and Anderton nearly shoots him, but relents at the last moment to place him under arrest. Crow then claims he was hired to pose as Sean's killer and goad Anderton into killing him, saying that his family will be paid only if he dies. When Anderton refuses, Crow engages him in a physical struggle, forcing Anderton to shoot and kill him in a manner similar to the precogs' vision.

Witwer investigates Lively's case and finds clues suggesting that she was murdered. When he reports his findings to Lamar Burgess, the director of Precrime, Burgess kills him, knowing that the remaining two precogs cannot foresee his crime without Agatha. Precrime officers locate Anderton at Lara's house and imprison him for murdering Crow and Witwer. While discussing Anderton's concerns about Lively with Burgess, Lara becomes suspicious of him. She breaks Anderton out of prison, which allows him to confront Burgess at a banquet celebrating the national launch of Precrime.

Anderton reveals that Lively was Agatha's mother. She had given up custody of Agatha, but later tried to reclaim her. Desperate to preserve Precrime, Burgess hired a man to kill Lively, knowing that Precrime would intervene. After the murder was prevented, Burgess killed Lively himself in the predicted manner. The Precrime technicians, trained to disregard the second murder vision as an echo of the first one, deleted the record. Once Anderton began to investigate, Burgess arranged for Crow to pose as Sean's abductor to provoke Anderton to murder.

The precogs predict that Burgess will kill Anderton at the banquet, but Burgess kills himself instead. This demonstration of the fallibility of the precogs leads Precrime to be shut down, and all the prisoners are pardoned and released. Anderton and Lara have reconciled and are expecting a second child, while the precogs are moved to an undisclosed location to live in peace and anonymity.

== Cast ==
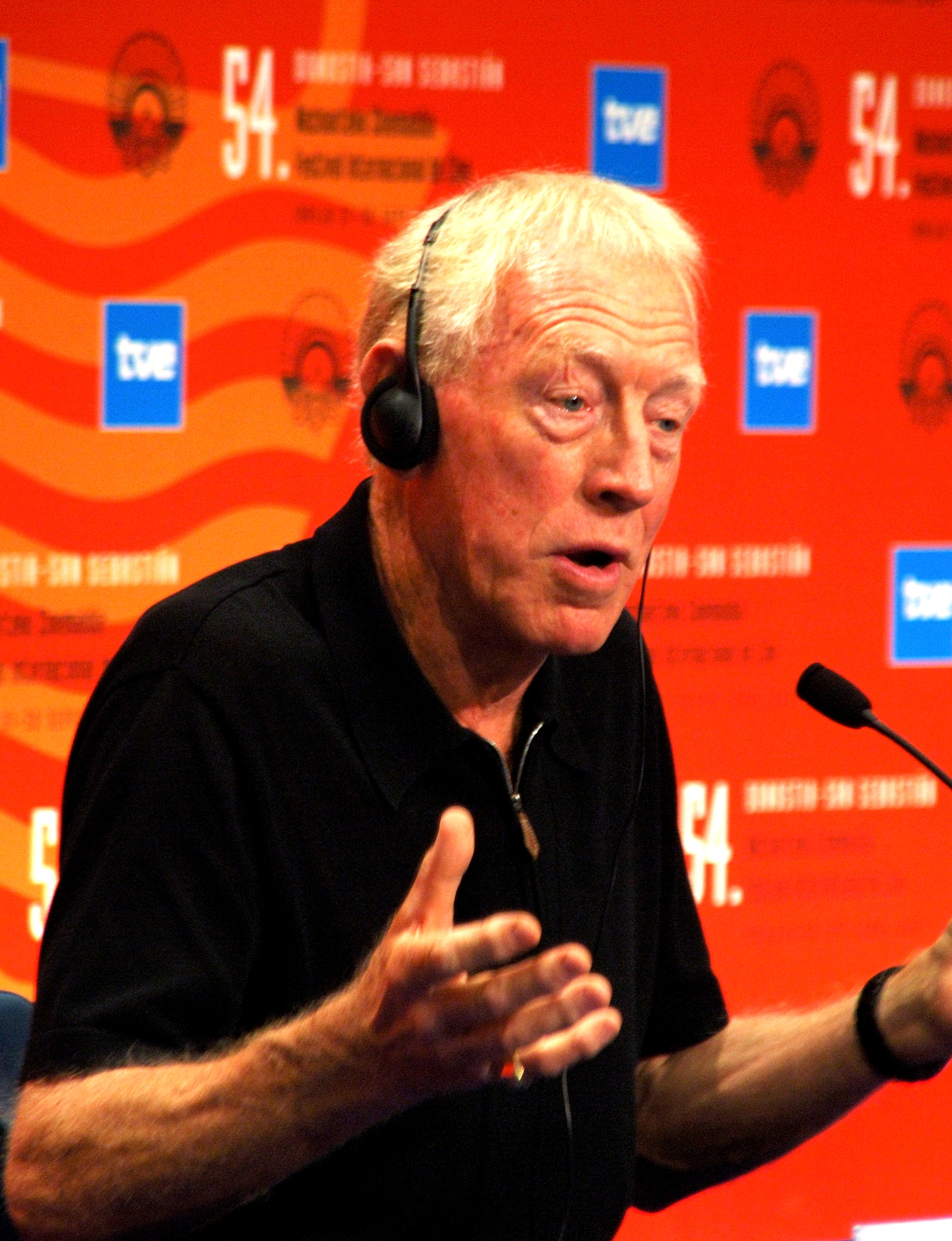
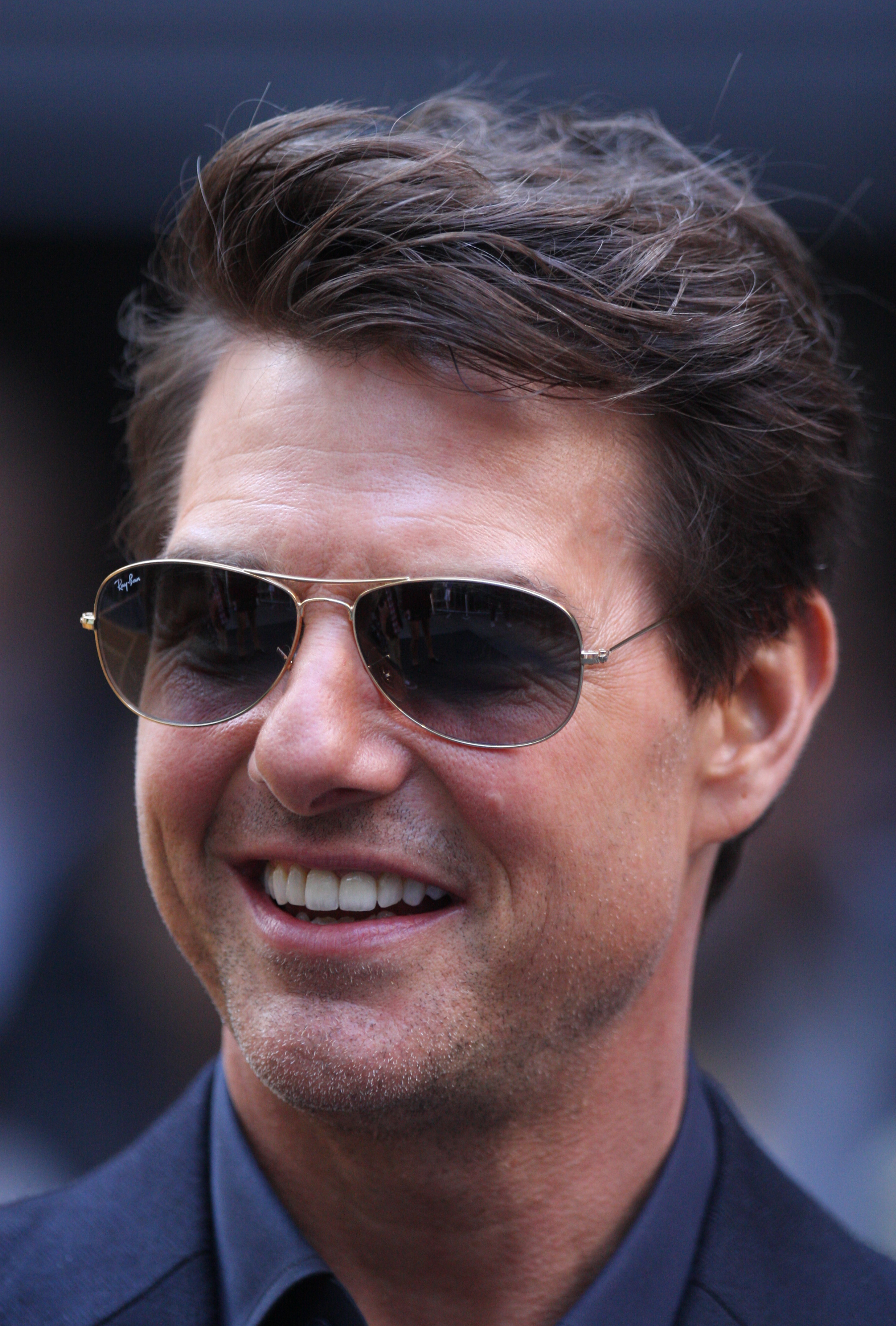
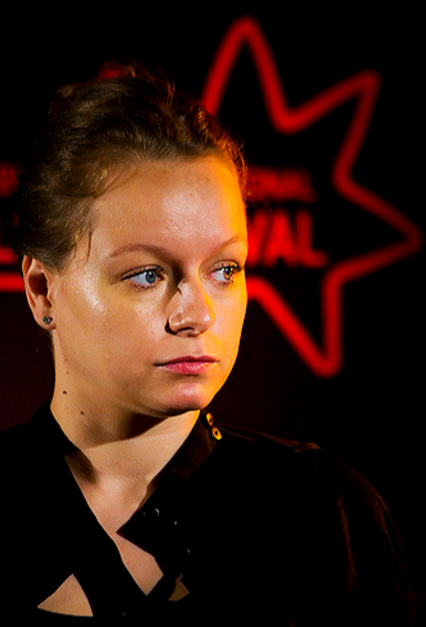
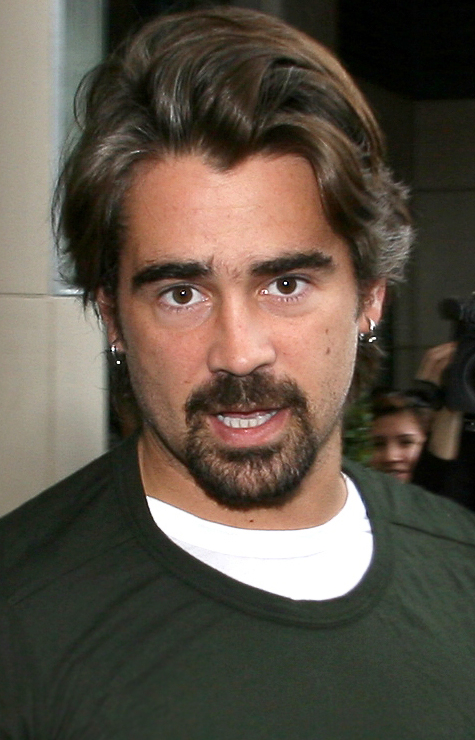
Clockwise from top left:
Max von Sydow, Tom Cruise, Colin Farrell and Samantha Morton
- Tom Cruise as Chief John Anderton, the commanding officer of Precrime
- Max von Sydow as Lamar Burgess, the director of Precrime
- Colin Farrell as Danny Witwer, an agent from the Department of Justice
- Samantha Morton as Agatha Lively, described as the most "gifted" of the three precogs
- Neal McDonough as Gordon "Fletch" Fletcher, a Precrime officer
- Patrick Kilpatrick as Geoffrey Knott, a Precrime officer
- Michael and Matthew Dickman as Arthur and Dashiell "Dash" Arkadin, the precog twins
- Lois Smith as Dr. Iris Hineman, the creator of Precrime
- Kathryn Morris as Lara Anderton, the estranged wife of John Anderton
- Mike Binder as Leo Crow, the Precrime victim who is supposed to be killed by Anderton
- Steve Harris as Jad Watson, a Precrime agent
- Jessica Harper as Anne Lively, Agatha's mother
- Tim Blake Nelson as Gideon, a guard of the Precrime prison
- Daniel London as Norbert "Wally" Wallace, the caretaker of the precogs
- Peter Stormare as Dr. Solomon P. Eddie, a back-alley surgeon who replaces Anderton's eyes
- Jessica Capshaw as Evanna, Precrime's transport pilot
- Tyler Patrick Jones as Sean Anderton, John and Lara's missing son
- Jason Antoon as Rufus T. Riley, a cyber parlor proprietor and hacker
- Nancy Linehan Charles as Celeste Burgess, Lamar's wife

The cast also features Victor Raider-Wexler as Attorney General Arthur Nash, Arye Gross as Howard Marks, Ashley Crow as Sarah Marks, David Stifel as Lycon, Anna Maria Horsford as Casey, Joel Gretsch as Donald Dubin, Tom Choi as Nick Paymen, Caroline Lagerfelt as Greta van Eyck, William Mapother as a hotel clerk, Frank Grillo as Precrime Cop, and Jim Rash as Technician. Cameron Diaz, Cameron Crowe, and Paul Thomas Anderson make uncredited cameo appearances as subway passengers.

== Production ==
=== Development ===
Philip K. Dick's 1956 novella "The Minority Report" was first optioned by the producer and writer Gary Goldman in 1992. He wrote the initial script for the film with Ron Shusett and Robert Goethals. It was meant to be a sequel to the 1990 Dick adaptation Total Recall, which starred Arnold Schwarzenegger. Carolco Pictures, the production company that produced the film, went bankrupt in 1995, before it could secure either funding or Schwarzenegger's interest in the project. While the remake rights were purchased by Miramax Films in 1997, Shusett and Goldman had removed the Total Recall elements from their script to develop it as a standalone film, Minority Report.

Novelist Jon Cohen was hired in 1997 to adapt the story for a potential film version that would have been directed by Dutch filmmaker Jan de Bont. Meanwhile, Tom Cruise and Steven Spielberg, who met and became friends on the set of Cruise's film Risky Business in 1983, had been looking to collaborate for ten years. Spielberg was set to direct Cruise in Rain Man, but left to make Indiana Jones and the Last Crusade. Cruise read Cohen's script, and passed it on to Spielberg, who felt it needed some work. Spielberg was not directly involved in the writing of the script, though he was allowed to decide whether the picture's screenplay was ready to be filmed. When Cohen submitted an acceptable revision, he called Cruise and said, "Yeah, I'll do this version of the script." In that version, Witwer creates a false disk which shows Anderton killing him. When Anderton sees the clip, his belief in the infallibility of the precogs' visions convinces him it is true, therefore the precogs have a vision of him killing Witwer. At the end, Anderton shoots Witwer and one of the brother precogs finishes him off, because Witwer had slain his twin. Spielberg was attracted to the story because as both a mystery and a film set 50 years in the future, it allowed him to do "a blending of genres" which intrigued him.

In 1998, the pair joined Minority Report and announced the production as a joint venture of Spielberg's DreamWorks and Amblin Entertainment, 20th Century Fox, Cruise's Cruise/Wagner Productions, and De Bont's production company, Blue Tulip, the latter of which had previously worked on Speed 2: Cruise Control. In exchange for directing The Haunting, Spielberg offered to take over directing duties on Minority Report while De Bont was busy with post-production for Twister. Spielberg however stated that despite being credited, De Bont never became involved with the film. Cruise and Spielberg, at Spielberg's insistence, reportedly agreed to each take 15% of the gross instead of any money up front to try to keep the film's budget under $100 million. Spielberg said he had done the same with name actors in the past to great success: "Tom Hanks took no cash for Saving Private Ryan but he made a lot of money on his profit participation." He made this agreement a prerequisite:

I haven't worked with many movie stars—80 per cent of my films don't have movie stars—and I've told them if they want to work with me I want them to gamble along with me. I haven't taken a salary in 18 years for a movie, so if my film makes no money I get no money. They should be prepared to do the same.

Production was delayed for several years. The original plan was to begin filming after Cruise's Mission: Impossible 2 was finished, but that film ran over schedule, which also allowed Spielberg time to bring in screenwriter Scott Frank to rework Cohen's screenplay. John August did an uncredited draft to polish the script, and Frank Darabont was also invited to rewrite, but was by then busy with The Majestic. The film closely follows Scott Frank's final script (completed May 16, 2001), and contains much of Cohen's third draft (May 24, 1997). Frank removed the character of Senator Malcolm from Cohen's screenplay, and inserted Burgess, who became the "bad guy". He also rewrote Witwer from a villain to a "good guy", as he was in the short story. In contrast to Spielberg's next science fiction picture, War of the Worlds, which he called "100 percent character" driven, Spielberg said the story for Minority Report became "50 percent character and 50 percent very complicated storytelling with layers and layers of murder mystery and plot." According to film scholar Warren Buckland, Cohen and Frank apparently did not see the Goldman and Shusett screenplay, but instead worked on their own adaptation. Goldman and Shusett, however, claimed the pair used a lot of material from their script, so the issue went through the Writer's Guild arbitration process. They won a partial victory; they were not given writing credits, but were listed as executive producers. The film was delayed again so Spielberg could finish A.I. after the death of his friend Stanley Kubrick. When Spielberg originally signed on to direct, he planned to have an entirely different supporting cast. He offered the role of Witwer to Matt Damon, Iris Hineman to Meryl Streep, Burgess to Ian McKellen, Agatha to Cate Blanchett, and Lara to Jenna Elfman. Streep declined the role, Damon opted out due to scheduling conflicts with Ocean's Eleven, and the other roles were recast due to the delays. Spielberg also offered the role of Witwer to Javier Bardem, who turned it down.

=== Technology ===
After E.T., Spielberg started to consult experts, and put more scientific research into his science fiction films. In 1999, he invited fifteen experts convened by Peter Schwartz and Stewart Brand to a hotel in Santa Monica for a three-day "think tank". He wanted to consult with the group to create a plausible "future reality" for the year 2054 as opposed to a more traditional "science fiction" setting. Dubbed the "think tank summit", the experts included architect Peter Calthorpe, author Douglas Coupland, urbanist and journalist Joel Garreau, computer scientist Neil Gershenfeld, biomedical researcher Shaun Jones, computer scientist Jaron Lanier, and former Massachusetts Institute of Technology (MIT) architecture dean William J. Mitchell. Production designer Alex McDowell kept what was nicknamed the "2054 bible", an 80-page guide created in preproduction which listed all the aspects of the future world: architectural, socio-economic, political, and technological. While the discussions did not change key elements in the film, they were influential in the creation of some of the more utopian aspects, though John Underkoffler, the science and technology advisor for the film, described it as "much grayer and more ambiguous" than what was envisioned in 1999. Underkoffler, who designed most of Anderton's interface after Spielberg told him to make it "like conducting an orchestra", said "it would be hard to identify anything [in the movie] that had no grounding in reality." McDowell teamed up with architect Greg Lynn to work on some of the technical aspects of the production design. Lynn praised his work, saying that a "lot of those things Alex cooked up for Minority Report, like the 3-D screens, have become real."

Spielberg described his ideas for the film's technology to Roger Ebert before its release:

I wanted all the toys to come true someday. I want there to be a transportation system that doesn't emit toxins into the atmosphere. And the newspaper that updates itself ... The Internet is watching us now. If they want to. They can see what sites you visit. In the future, television will be watching us, and customizing itself to what it knows about us. The thrilling thing is, that will make us feel we're part of the medium. The scary thing is, we'll lose our right to privacy. An ad will appear in the air around us, talking directly to us.

=== Filming ===
Minority Report was the first film to have an entirely digital production design. Termed "previz"—an abbreviation of "previsualization", a word borrowed from the film's narrative—the system allowed the crew to use Photoshop instead of painters, and to employ 3D animation programs (Maya and XSI) to create a simulated set, which could be filled with digital actors and then used to plan shots. The technology also allowed the tie-in video game and special effects companies to obtain data from the system before the film was finished, which they used to plan their visuals.

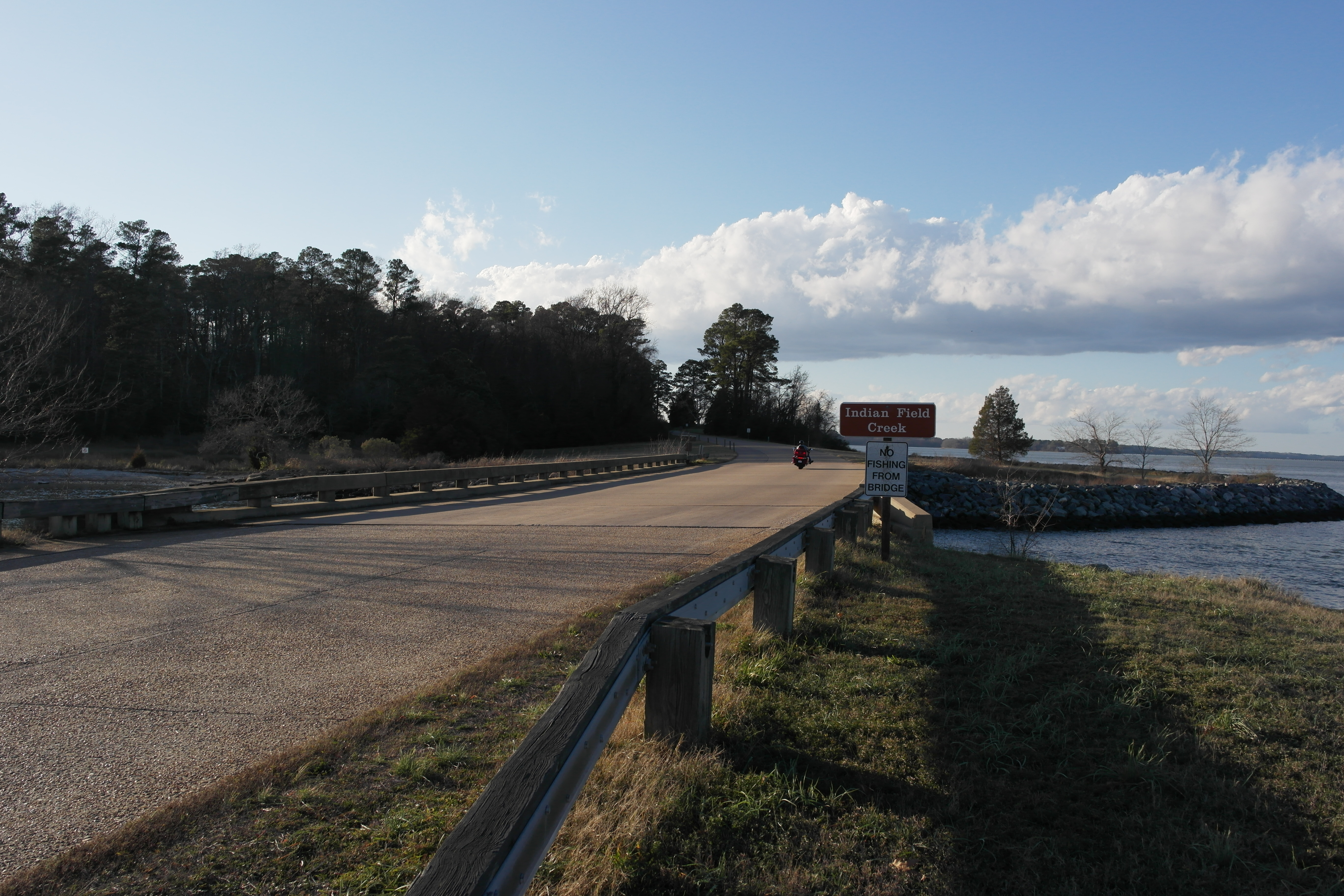
Indian Field Creek Bridge on the Colonial Parkway in Yorktown, Virginia

Filming took place from March 22 to July 18, 2001 in Washington, D.C., Virginia, and Los Angeles. Locations included the Ronald Reagan Building (as PreCrime headquarters) and Georgetown. The skyline of Rosslyn, Virginia is visible when Anderton flies across the Potomac River. A brief shot of Indian Field Creek, which crosses the Colonial Parkway in Yorktown, Virginia, is seen as John takes Agatha to his wife's house. During production, Spielberg and Cruise made regular appearances on a webcam based in the craft services truck. Butter Island—off North Haven, Maine in the Penobscot Bay—was used for the island in the last shot of the film.

Although it takes place in an imagined future world of advanced technology, Minority Report attempts to embody a more "realistic" depiction of the future. Spielberg decided that to be more credible, the setting had to keep both elements of the present and ones which specialists expected would be forthcoming. Thus Washington, D.C., as depicted in the movie keeps well-known buildings such as the Capitol and the Washington Monument, as well as a section of modern buildings on the other side of the Potomac River. Production designer Alex McDowell was hired based on his work in Fight Club and his storyboards for a film version of Fahrenheit 451 which would have starred Mel Gibson. McDowell studied modern architecture, and his sets contain many curves, circular shapes, and reflective materials. Costume designer Deborah L. Scott decided to make the clothes worn by the characters as simple as possible, so as not to make the depiction of the future seem dated.

The stunt crew was the same one used in Cruise's Mission: Impossible 2, and was responsible for complex action scenes. These included the auto factory chase scene, filmed in a real facility using props such as a welding robot, and the fight between Anderton and the jetpack-clad officers, filmed in an alley set built on the Warner Bros. studio lot. Industrial Light & Magic (ILM) did most of the visual effects, while PDI/DreamWorks was responsible for the Spyder robots, making it their final live-action visual effects job before solely working with DreamWorks Animation shortly afterwards. PDI visual effects supervisor Henry LaBounta took inspiration from deep sea jellyfish while creating the Spyder robots: "Their tentacles have these bioluminescent little lights that kind of run through their tentacles and that just looks so cool. So I got back to the studio and talked to the artists and I said, 'We're gonna do some radiating jellyfish bioluminescent lights on the bottom of this spider, and try that.'" Pixel Liberation Front handled previsualization animatics. The holographic projections and the prison facility were filmed by several roving cameras which surrounded the actors, and the scene where Anderton gets off his car and runs along the Maglev vehicles was filmed on stationary props, which were later replaced by computer-generated vehicles.

=== Storyline differences ===
The Philip K. Dick story only gives you a springboard that really doesn't have a second or third act. Most of the movie is not in the Philip K. Dick story – to the chagrin of the Philip K. Dick fans, I'm sure.

— Steven Spielberg, June 2002

Like most film adaptations of Dick's works, many aspects of his story were changed in their transition to film, such as the addition of Lamar Burgess and the change in setting from New York City to Washington, D.C., Baltimore, and Northern Virginia. The character of John Anderton was changed from a balding and out-of-shape old man to an athletic officer in his 40s to fit its portrayer and the film's action scenes. The film adds two stories of tragic families; Anderton's, and that of the three pre-cogs. In the short story, Anderton is married with no children, while in the film, he is the divorced father of a kidnapped son, who is most likely deceased.

Although implied, it's unclear in the film whether Agatha is related to the twin pre-cogs; her family was shattered when Burgess murdered her mother, Anne Lively. The precogs were intellectually disabled and deformed individuals in the story, but in the film, they are the genetically mutated offspring of drug addicts.

Anderton's future murder and the reasons for the conspiracy were changed from a general who wants to discredit PreCrime to regain some military funding, to a man who murdered a precog's mother to preserve PreCrime. The subsequent murders and plot developed from this change. The film's ending also differs from the short story's. In Dick's story, Anderton prevents the closure of the PreCrime division, but in the movie Anderton successfully brings about the end of the organization. Other aspects were updated to include current technology. For instance, in the story, Anderton uses a punch card machine to interpret the precogs' visions; in the movie, he uses a virtual reality interface.

=== Themes ===
The main theme of Minority Report is the classic philosophical debate of free will versus determinism. Other themes explored by the film include involuntary commitment, the nature of political and legal systems in a high technology-advanced society, the rights of privacy in a media-dominated world, and the nature of self-perception. The film also continues to follow Spielberg's tradition of depicting broken families, which he has said is motivated by his parents' divorce when he was a child.

== Soundtrack ==
The score was composed and conducted by regular Spielberg collaborator John Williams, who was inspired by Bernard Herrmann's film music, instead of focusing on the science fiction elements, he made a score suitable for the film noir, including the use of female singer in the some sequences, and emotional themes, which Williams considered unusual for that genre. Several classical pieces, including Franz Schubert's Symphony No. 8 (Unfinished Symphony), Haydn's String Quartet (Op. 64, No. 1), Tchaikovsky's Symphony No. 6 (Pathétique), were implemented in the score, though Williams said that the choices of using classical pieces were made by the studio.

Besides composing, Williams conducted the score, with orchestration by John Neufeld and vocals by Deborah Dietrich. The music was released on June 18, 2002, by DreamWorks Records in CD, vinyl and cassettes, and re-issued by Geffen Records in mid-2014 for streaming media and download. The full score as heard in the film, was released into a 2-disc "expanded edition" in 2019, which was marketed by La-La Land Records, along with several alternate and unused tracks as bonus material.

== Style ==
Minority Report's unique visual style: It was overlit, and the negatives were bleach-bypassed in post-production to desaturate the colors in the film.

Minority Report is a futuristic film which portrays elements of a both dystopian and utopian future. The film renders a much more detailed view of its future world than the book and contains new technologies not in Dick's story. From a stylistic standpoint, Minority Report resembles Spielberg's previous film A.I., but also incorporates elements of film noir. Spielberg said that he "wanted to give the movie a noir feel. So I threw myself a film festival. Asphalt Jungle. Key Largo. The Maltese Falcon." The picture was deliberately overlit, and the negative was bleach-bypassed during post-production. The scene in which Anderton is dreaming about his son's kidnapping at the pool is the only one shot in "normal" color. Bleach-bypassing gave the film a distinctive look; it desaturated the film's colors, to the point that it nearly resembles a black-and-white movie, yet the blacks and shadows have a high contrast like a film noir picture. The color was reduced by "about 40%" to achieve the "washed-out" appearance. Elvis Mitchell, formerly of The New York Times, commented that "The picture looks as if it were shot on chrome, caught on the fleeing bumper of a late '70s car."

Spielberg preferred film to the then-emerging digital video format and opted to create the film's look photochemically. Cinematographer Janusz Kamiński shot with high-speed film in Super 35 format (which requires an additional enlarging process) to increase the overall grain, having been told by Spielberg to create "the ugliest, dirtiest movie" he'd ever shot. The film's camera work is very mobile, alternating between handheld and Steadicam shots, which are "exaggerated by the use of wide angle lenses and the occasional low camera angle" to increase the perception of movement according to film scholar Warren Buckland.

Kamiński said that he never used a lens longer than 27mm, and alternated between 17, 21, and 27mm lenses, as Spielberg liked to "keep the actors as close to the camera as possible". He also said, "We staged a lot of scenes in wide shots that have a lot of things happening with the frame." The duo also used several long takes to focus on the emotions of the actors, rather than employing numerous cuts.

Spielberg eschewed the typical "shot reverse shot" cinematography technique used when filming characters' interactions in favor of the long takes, which were shot by a mobile, probing camera. McDowell relied on colorless chrome and glass objects of curved and circular shapes in his set designs, which, aided by the "low-key contrastive lighting", populated the film with shadows, creating a "futuristic film noir atmosphere".

=== Opening sequence ===
Buckland describes the film's 14-minute opening sequence as the "most abstract and complex of any Spielberg film." The first scene is a distorted precog vision of a murder, presented out of context. The pace of the film is sped up, slowed, and even reversed, and the movie "jumps about in time and space" by intercutting the images in no discernible order. When it ends, it becomes clear that the scene was presented through Agatha's eyes, and that this is how previsions appear to her. Fellow scholar Nigel Morris called this scene a "trailer", because it foreshadows the plot and establishes the type of "tone, generic expectations, and enigmas" that will be used in the film.

The visions of the pre-cogs are presented in a fragmented series of clips using a "squishy lens" device, which distorts the images, blurring their edges and creating ripples across them. They were created by a two-man production team, hired by Spielberg, who chose the "layered, dreamlike imagery" based on some comments from cognitive psychologists the pair consulted. In the opening's next scene, Anderton is "scrubbing the images", by standing like a composer (as Spielberg terms it), and manipulating them, while Jad assists him. Next the family involved in the murder in Agatha's vision is shown interacting, which establishes that the opening scene was a prevision. The picture then cuts back to Anderton and the precogs' images, before alternating between the three.

The opening is self-contained, and according to Buckland acts merely as a setup for numerous elements of the story. It lasts 14 minutes, includes 171 shots, and has an average shot length of five seconds as opposed to the 6.5 second average for the entire film. The opening's five-second average is attained despite "very fast cutting" in the beginning and ending, because the middle has longer takes, which reach 20 seconds in some instances. Spielberg also continues his tradition of "heavily diffused backlighting" for much of the interior shots.

== Release ==
=== Context ===
The summer of 2002 was expected to be competitive at the global box office due to the high number of franchises, blockbusters, and star-studded projects.

Spielberg typically keeps the plot points of his films closely guarded before their release and Minority Report was no different. He said he had to remove some scenes and a few "F-words" to get the film's PG-13 rating. Following the disappointing box office results of Spielberg's A.I., the marketing campaign for Minority Report downplayed his role in the movie and sold the film as a Cruise action thriller.

Tom Rothman, chairman of the film's co-financier Fox Filmed Entertainment, described the film's marketing strategy thus: "How are we marketing it? It's Cruise and Spielberg. What else do we need to do?" The strategy made sense; coming into the film, Spielberg had made 20 films which grossed a domestic total of $2.8 billion, while Cruise's resume featured 23 films and $2 billion in domestic revenues. With their combined 30% take of the film's box office though, sources such as BusinessWeek's Ron Grover predicted the studios would have a hard time making the money needed to break even. Despite the outward optimism, as a more adult-oriented, darker film than typical blockbusters, the studio held different box office expectations for the film than they would a more family friendly film.

Entertainment Weekly projected the film would gross $40 million in the US in its opening weekend, and Variety predicted that the high concept storyline would not appeal to children and would render it a "commercial extra-base hit rather than a home run."

=== Theatrical run ===
The world premiere of Minority Report took place in New York City on June 17, 2002. An online "popcorn cam" broadcast live from inside the premiere. Cruise attended the London premiere the following week, and mingled with thousands of adoring fans as he walked through the city's Leicester Square. It debuted at first place in the U.S. box office, collecting $35.677 million in its opening weekend, narrowly above Lilo & Stitch. Forbes considered those numbers below expectations, as they gave the film a small edge over Lilo & Stitch, which debuted in second place ($35.260 million). Lilo & Stitch sold more tickets, but since much of the film's attendees were children, its average ticket price was much lower.

The film opened at the top of the box office in numerous foreign markets; it made $6.7 million in 780 locations in Germany its opening weekend, and accounted for 35% of France's total box office weekend office gross when it collected $5 million in 700 theaters. In Great Britain, Minority Report made $36.9 million in its first three days. It went on to make $5.9 million in the UK, ranking number one at the box office, beating Spider-Man. Minority Report had the country's third-highest opening for a Steven Spielberg film, behind Jurassic Park and its successor The Lost World: Jurassic Park.

The film then made $6.2 million in Italy in its first ten, $815,000 in its 75 location opening weekend in Belgium, and $405,000 in an 80 theater opening weekend in Switzerland. Meanwhile, in Turkey, it made $307,822 from 64 screens, achieving the third-highest opening for any 20th Century Fox film in the country, after Star Wars: Episode I – The Phantom Menace and Titanic. The BBC felt the film's UK performance was "buoyed by Cruise's charm offensive at last week's London premiere."

Minority Report made a total of $132 million in the United States and $226.3 million overseas.

== Home media ==
DreamWorks spent several million dollars marketing the film's DVD and VHS releases. The campaign included a tie-in video game released by Activision, which contained a trailer for the movie's DVD. Minority Report was successful in the home video market, selling at least four million DVDs in its first few months of release. The DVD took two years to produce. For the first time, Spielberg allowed filmmakers to shoot footage on the set of one of his films. Premiere-award-winning DVD producer Laurent Bouzereau, who would become a frequent Spielberg DVD collaborator, shot hundreds of hours of the film's production in the brand new high-definition video format. It contained over an hour of featurettes which discussed various aspects of film production, included visual effects breakdowns of the film's stunt sequences, and new interviews with Spielberg, Cruise, and other "Academy Award-winning filmmakers".

In February 2006, Viacom (now known as Paramount Skydance) acquired half of the rights to Minority Report, along with the rights to all other live-action films DreamWorks had produced since 1997, following their billion-dollar acquisition of the company's live-action assets. When Paramount purchased DreamWorks' live-action assets, 20th Century Fox still retained their original ownership stake in Minority Report. The film was released on a two-disc Blu-ray by Paramount Home Entertainment on May 16, 2010. It included exclusive extras and interactive features, such as a new Spielberg interview, that were not included in the DVD edition. The film was transferred from its "HD master" which retained the distinctive grainy appearance. In March 2019, the other half of the film's rights (which was also included scenes from The Mark of Zorro (1940) and House of Bamboo (1955)) transferred to The Walt Disney Company, after Rupert Murdoch sold most of 21st Century Fox's film and television assets to Disney.

On December 9, 2025 the movie was released on Ultra HD Blu-ray.

== Video game ==
A video game based on the film titled Minority Report: Everybody Runs was developed by Treyarch, published by Activision and released on November 18, 2002, for PlayStation 2, Xbox, GameCube, and Game Boy Advance. It received mixed reviews.

== Reception ==
On the review aggregator Rotten Tomatoes, Minority Report holds an 89% approval rating based on 260 reviews and an average rating of 8.20/10. The site's critical consensus is, "Thought-provoking and visceral, Steven Spielberg successfully combines high concept ideas and high octane action in this fast and febrile sci-fi thriller." The website listed it among the best reviewed films of 2002. The film also earned an 80 out of a possible 100 on the similar review aggregating website Metacritic based on 37 reviews, indicating "generally favorable reviews". Audiences polled by CinemaScore gave the film an average grade of "B+" on an A+ to F scale.

Most critics gave the film's handling of its central theme (free will vs. determinism) positive reviews, and many ranked it as the film's main strength. Other reviewers felt that Spielberg did not adequately tackle the issues he raised. The film has inspired discussion and analysis, the scope of which has been compared to the continuing analysis of Blade Runner. This discussion has advanced past the realm of standard film criticism. Slovenian philosopher Slavoj Žižek fashioned a criticism of the Cheney Doctrine by comparing its preemptive strike methodology to that of the film's PreCrime system.

Richard Corliss of Time said it's "Spielberg's sharpest, brawniest, most bustling entertainment since Raiders of the Lost Ark". Mike Clark of USA Today felt it succeeded due to a "breathless 140-minute pace with a no-flab script packed with all kinds of surprises." Lisa Schwarzbaum of Entertainment Weekly praised the film's visuals, and Todd McCarthy of Variety complimented the cast's performances. Film scholar Warren Buckland recommended the film, but felt that the comedic elements—aside from Stormare's lines—detracted from the plot and undermined the film's credibility.

Several critics used their reviews to discuss Spielberg and analyze what the film signified in his development as a filmmaker. Andrew O'Hehir of the online magazine Salon expressed excitement over the atypically hard edge of the movie. "Little Steven Spielberg is all grown up now ... into of all things a superior film artist ... It's too early to know whether Minority Report, on the heels of A.I., marks a brief detour in Spielberg's career or a permanent change of course, but either way it's a dark and dazzling spectacle." J. Hoberman of The Village Voice said it is "the most entertaining, least pretentious genre movie Steven Spielberg has made in the decade since Jurassic Park." Randy Shulman of Metro Weekly said that "the movie is a huge leap forward for the director, who moves once and for all into the world of adult movie making."

Roger Ebert called the film a "masterpiece" and said that when most directors of the period were putting "their trust in technology", Spielberg had already mastered it, and was emphasizing "story and character" while merely using technology as a "workman uses his tools". Ebert eventually named the film the best film of the year and one of the best of the decade.

David Edelstein of Slate echoed the positive sentiments, saying "It has been a long time since a Spielberg film felt so nimble, so unfettered, so free of self-cannibalizing." Jonathan Rosenbaum, then of the Chicago Reader, was less convinced. Though he approved of the film, he derided it in his review as a superficial action film, cautioning audiences to enjoy the movie but not "be conned into thinking that some sort of serious, thoughtful statement is being delivered along with the roller-coaster ride."

Andrew Sarris of the New York Observer gave the film a negative review in which he described the script as full of plot holes, the car chases as silly, and criticized the mixture of futuristic environments with "defiantly retro costuming". The complexity of the storyline was also a source of criticism for Kenneth Turan of the Los Angeles Times, who considered the plot "too intricate and difficult to follow".

Rosenbaum and Hoberman both referred to the titular minority report as a "red herring". More positive reviews have seen it similarly, but referred to it as a "MacGuffin".

== Accolades ==
The film earned nominations for many awards, including Best Sound Editing at the 75th Academy Awards, and Best Visual Effects at the BAFTAs.

It was nominated for eleven Saturn Awards including Best Actor for Cruise, Best Supporting Actor for von Sydow and Best Music for Williams, and won four: Best Science Fiction Film, Best Direction for Spielberg, Best Writing for Frank and Cohen and Supporting Actress for Morton.

It was nominated for two Visual Effects Society Awards in the categories of "Best Effects Art Direction in a Motion Picture" and "Best Compositing in a Motion Picture". It also won the BMI Film Music Award, the Online Film Critics Society Award for Best Supporting Actress, and the Empire Awards for Best Actor for Cruise, Best Director for Spielberg and Best British Actress for Morton.

Ebert listed Minority Report as the best film of 2002, as did online film reviewer James Berardinelli. The film was also included in top ten lists by critic Richard Roeper, and both reviewers at USA Today.

=== Retrospective honors ===
In 2008, the American Film Institute nominated Minority Report for its Top 10 Science Fiction Films list.

Roger Ebert eventually named it one of his favorite films of the 2000s. Likewise, The Washington Post selected Minority Report as one of the 23 best films from 2000 to 2018. In 2025, it ranked number 94 on The New York Times' list of "The 100 Best Movies of the 21st Century" and was one of the films voted for the "Readers' Choice" edition of the list, finishing at number 215.

== Television series ==
On September 9, 2014, it was announced that a follow-up television series had been given a pilot commitment at Fox. Max Borenstein wrote the script and served as executive producer alongside Spielberg, Justin Falvey and Darryl Frank. The series was envisioned to be set 10 years after the film, and focused on a male precog who teams up with a female detective to find a purpose to his gift. On February 13, 2015, Daniel London and Li Jun Li joined the cast. On February 24, 2015, Laura Regan was cast as Agatha Lively, replacing Samantha Morton, who was said to have been offered to reprise the role.

In March 2015, Stark Sands and Meagan Good landed the lead roles with Sands playing the role of Dash, one of the male precogs, and Good playing Lara Vega, a detective haunted by her past, who works with Dash to help him find a purpose for his gift, Li Jun Li plays Akeela, a CSI technician, Daniel London reprised his role as Wally the Caretaker from the original film and Wilmer Valderrama was cast as a police detective.

The show was picked up as a series by Fox on May 9, 2015, and made its broadcast debut on September 21, 2015, but was cancelled on May 13, 2016.

== Theater adaptation ==
In 2023, it was announced that David Haig was working on a theatrical adaptation. The production had its world premiere in February 2024 at the Nottingham Playhouse. The story is set in London and the lead role was gender-swapped, becoming Dame Julia Anderton.

== See also ==
- Causal loop
- Inchoate offense
- List of films featuring surveillance
- 3D human–computer interaction

== Bibliography ==
- Buckland, Warren (2006). Directed by Steven Spielberg: Poetics of the Contemporary Hollywood Blockbuster. Continuum. ISBN 0826416918.
- Conrad, Mark T. (2007). The Philosophy of Neo-Noir. The University Press of Kentucky. ISBN 9780813124223.
- Cornea, Christine (2007). Science Fiction Cinema: Between Fantasy and Reality. Rutgers University Press. ISBN 9780813541730.
- Higgins, Gareth (2003). How movies helped save my soul. Relevant Books. ISBN 0971457697.
- Huemer, Michael (2009). Susan Schneider (ed.). Science fiction and philosophy: from time travel to superintelligence. John Wiley and Sons. ISBN 9781405149075.
- Jackson, Kathi (2007). Steven Spielberg: A Biography. Greenwood. ISBN 9780313337963.
- Dean A. Kowalski, ed. (2008). Steven Spielberg and Philosophy: We're Gonna Need a Bigger Book. The University Press of Kentucky. ISBN 9780813125275.
- Morris, Nigel (2006). The Cinema of Steven Spielberg: Empire of Light. Wallflower Press. ISBN 1904764894.
- Mulhall, Stephen (2008). On Film. Thinking in Action. Routledge. ISBN 9780415441537.
- Vest, Jason P. (2007). Future Imperfect: Philip K. Dick at the Movies. Praeger. ISBN 9780275991715.
