= Serial offender hunting patterns =

Studies have been made of the "hunting patterns" of serial offenders, mainly serial killers and those committing repeated sex crimes. Such patterns constitute the interaction of time, space, and activity of a serial offender's criminal behavior. The attempt is made to ascribe rational motives to the offender's choice of places and times; investigators may invoke routine activity theory and rational choice theory in relation to the location of crimes.

== Factors considered ==
Crime patterns have to be carefully considered when examining a serial offender. "Reasonably rational offenders, while engaging in their routine activities, will know places where victims can be contacted, abducted or assaulted without the interference of guardians or managers and where their handlers are unlikely to show up". Offenders tend to seek places where they can commit crimes without being seen.

Criminologist D. Kim Rossmo created "Rossmo's formula" to explain his ideas on serial offenders and geographic profiling to determine where criminals lived and why specific locations were chosen as places to commit crimes. Rossmo's Formula includes four methods used by criminals to seek out victims.

=== Routine Activity Theory ===
The Routine Activity Theory, developed in 1979 by Marcus Felson and Lawrence E. Cohen, argued that crime occurs because of setting and opportunity. The two theorists believe that there is little influence from a perpetrator's socioeconomic status at the time when criminal activity begins, but that the possibility of crime occurring to a particular group of people "...was influenced by the convergence in space and time of three main elements:

1. a motivated and potential offender,
2. an attractive and suitable target, and
3. an ineffective or absent capable guardian protecting [the victim] against a violation". This is particularly a factor when it comes to serial murderers and repeat sexual predators, which operate according to the Routine Activity Theory.

== Sexual predators ==
Sexual violence in society is considered a highly deviant, and anti-social activity. There are many laws that prohibit certain sexual acts due to motives and intent. "Sexual violence, in particular, is perceived as a learned behavior associated with interpersonal aggression, and sexuality as an outcome of social and cultural traditions". Essentially, sexual predators have a rationale behind their actions. People in unstimulated, or unmotivated circumstances, generally don't become sexual predators. It is most commonly found to be an escalation of behavior. It often begins as voyeurism, and over a period of time, evolves into molestation, rape, murder, or a combination of all of these.

A study related to sexual predators and their motivations was conducted in Quebec, Canada. The study participants were repeat sexual predators with earned custodial sentences of two or more years. There were 72 participants in the study with assault histories ranging from 2 to 37 sexual assaults. The individuals conducting the study wanted to determine the offenders' patterns through interviews, questionnaires, and police reports. They examined behaviors, routine activity, and geography (if the offense took place at the same place where the victim met the assailant). At the end of the study, the researchers found, that if an offender broke into an individual's home with the intention of raping his victim, he was more likely to use a limited number of criminal tactics to accomplish his goal, rather than to study the situation, and to plan an assault. On the other hand, if an offender used an outside space to commit an assault, he was more likely to commit numerous other crimes, while attempting to complete the crime of his original intent. These findings revolve around the Rational Choice Theory. The basic tenet underlying this theory is that an individual will weigh the cost and benefits of their actions, prior to execution.
