= SpotCrime.com =

- Website type: Web crime mapping
- Headquarters: Baltimore, Maryland
- Owners: ReportSee, Inc.
- Website: SpotCrime.com
- Commercial: Yes
- Launched: 2007

SpotCrime.com is a Baltimore-based company founded in October 2007 and privately owned by ReportSee, Inc. Its purpose is to provide nationwide crime information about arrests, arsons, assaults, burglaries, robberies, shootings, thefts and vandalism. SpotCrime generally maps data for any police agency which supplies open data access to crime data. Data mapped by SpotCrime is mainly sourced from police departments and news reports.

SpotCrime also provides data on missing persons and a crime tip application, CrimeTip.us.

The service advocates for open, equal, and fair access to public crime data.

The website originated as a part of the Emerging Technology Center (ETC) in Baltimore. It was included in a research paper funded by the U.S. Department of Justice and prepared by SCRA titled 'Survey and Evaluation of Online Crime Mapping'. Notably, the service also created and published the SpotCrime Open Crime Standard (SOCS) in March 2014.

== Availability in other applications ==
SpotCrime.com powers a 'sister' site - MyLocalCrime.com, and a full-screen version of SpotCrime. MyLocalCrime displays the same data as SpotCrime, only in a different format. SpotCrime.info is also viewable on a mobile browser. ReportSee, Inc. (SpotCrime) is also in charge of UCrime.com, a university crime mapping website.

SpotCrime has created apps for iGoogle Gadget, iPhone in 2009, Android, Layar in 2010 and DirecTV.

The service actively maintains SpotCrime apps for iPhone, Android, and as an Amazon Alexa skill, as well as MyLocalCrime apps for iPhone and Android.

== Advocacy work for open crime data ==
SpotCrime advocates for open, equal, and fair access to crime data for the public and press at the jurisdictional level. Open crime data is inaccessible to the public and press in many US cities. The service relies on public record laws to access the crime data for its website and encourages all police agencies to make their data available to the public openly without restrictions.

=== Lawsuit ===
On April 9, 2010, Public Engines, Inc. (CrimeReports.com) filed a lawsuit against ReportSee, Inc. (SpotCrime) for violating the Terms of Use on the CrimeReports website.

==== SpotCrime's Role in Dispute of Private Outsourcing of Public Data ====
According to the Poynter Institute, SpotCrime's founder, Colin Drane, was sued by Public Engines, a competitor. Public Engine's CEO acknowledges that the data he uses is public, but contends that it is up to the police agencies to make the data public. Poynter also acknowledges that some police agencies, who have already partnered with other crime-mapping sites, are using existing agreements to “control” access to crime data. This raises concerns over the ability of journalists to transparently receive data from police departments, and the questions of exactly who constitutes “media” in a time of technological change.

In 2015, Public Engines was purchased by Motorola Solutions, Motorola later discontinued the CrimeReports.com web site and launched CityProtect.com. Motorola then began to publish an open crime data API to over 400 public crime data sets via Socrata. In 2019 when Socrata was purchased by Tyler Technologies, a Motorola competitor, Motorola turned off the Socrata open API, discontinuing public and open access to over 400 open crime data sets nationwide.

Seven years after the lawsuit, Reveal created by The Center for Investigative Reporting (CIR) published an investigative piece covering how many private contractors were continually attempting to privatize data in the public domain. Reveal cited SpotCrime as an “outspoken advocate for greater state and local transparency” noting that SpotCrime's advocacy for open crime data was an “imbroglio…tale of technological advances, tight government budgets and growing pressure for transparency.” The article explained how private vendors contracted with local governments for data management and software are essentially given control over government and publicly owned data. This kind of relationship enables the vendor's ability to control the flow of public information and restrict the ability of the public to download and re-share public data.

In 2020, The Criminologist, a newsletter published by the American Society of Criminology, published an op-ed authored by SpotCrime “A Call for Researchers to Embrace Robust, Open Crime Data”, where the company asked for researchers to embrace an open data mindset behind data used in policing and to resist vendor control of public data.

In 2022, Georgetown University Law Center published a paper that highlighted how when government agencies outsource data management to private software companies, the government agencies allow private entities to limit public and agency access to public information. SpotCrime was cited in the paper as a source for the open crime data landscape nationwide to explain how government vendors are hindering access to public data.

=== FOIA and access to public data ===
SpotCrime periodically utilizes local Freedom of Information Act laws (FOIA) to access public data.

In 2020, The University of Florida Brechner Center for Freedom of Information published an op-ed by SpotCrime “Without a trace: How a misfired Florida law makes crimes disappear” covering how Florida's version of the victims rights law known as Marsy’s Law was allowing police agencies to hide public crime data.

Also in 2020, SpotCrime won a FOIA appeal in Harrisburg, Pennsylvania. SpotCrime requested blotter information, but the city of Harrisburg denied the request claiming that records do not exist, it does not possess the requested report, and is unable to create such a report by extracting information from its database. SpotCrime appealed to the Pennsylvania Office of Open Records (PA ORR) on the basis that the data is available in the city's database and is therefore public information. The PA OOR appeal office noted that “to the extent required information exists in a database, it must be provided; an agency cannot claim otherwise under Section 705 of the RTKL…Information contained within an agency’s database is subject to public access regardless of the agency’s difficulty in retrieving the information” and granted SpotCrime's appeal for the public data.

In 2021, the city of York, Pennsylvania denied SpotCrime's request on the same grounds as the city of Harrisburg denial. The PA OOR appeals office ruled again in SpotCrime's favor and the city of York released the data.

In 2022, the city of York then stopped providing the data file, pointing SpotCrime to a third party private website with a terms of use and no ability to download the data SpotCrime was seeking. SpotCrime appealed this denial and the PA OOR appeals office ruled in SpotCrime's favor again, noting that “the City has not shown that it is unable to extract the requested information from the city’s contracted RMS/CAD vendor, especially since the city’s vendor shares the same information with a third party private website”.

=== Legislative testimony on access to public data ===
SpotCrime has provided testimony on open data and FOIA laws in the US.

In March 2014, SpotCrime provided written and verbal legislative testimony on Maryland Open Data Bill (SB644) advocating for open and public data in Maryland. The bill was passed in April 2014.

In 2022, SpotCrime provided written testimony on Kansas FOIA SB386 advocating for equitable access to open and public crime data under FOIA in relation to FOIA fees assessed in the state of Kansas.

=== Open crime data transparency ranking ===
In 2013, SpotCrime created a periodically updated transparency ranking for public crime data across the US. SpotCrime ranked many of the major cities around the nation on a scale of 0 to 2, where 2 means the data is open, easily accessible and free; 1 means the data is open but incomplete, out-of-date or difficult to access; and 0 means the data is unavailable to the public without going through a vendor or the police agency will not share the data. GovTech noted that since crime data transparency is varied across the nation the SpotCrime crime data transparency ranking “demonstrates that this variation also illuminates the mercurial landscape of open data, as policies change and some data sets disappear under the umbrella of a proprietary vendor.”

The company also published a ranking for Campus Police in 2014 that ranks access to publicly available Clery Act crime logs. The university ranking is periodically updated.

=== The SpotCrime Open Crime Standard (SOCS) ===
The standard, similar to LIVES or GFTS, standardizes a format to facilitate the release of crime information openly. SOCS has been adopted by agencies across the country.

== Coverage area ==
At the beginning of 2012, SpotCrime made its historical crime database available to anyone who asks, free of charge by using Amazon's S3 technology. 'The data set was then approximately one gigabyte of data. Data included the type of crime, location including latitude and longitude coordinates, date, time, description, and referral source.'

== Competition ==
There are many other US based crime mapping companies. Competitors include:

- CityProtect.com (owned by Motorola)
- CommunityCrimeMap.com (owned by LexisNexis)
- Crimedar.com
- CrimeReports.com (defunct)
- Crimemapping.com (owned by TriTech)
- EveryBlock.com (defunct)
- City-Safe.com (travel crime mapping)
- MapNimbus.com
- MyNeighborhoodUpdate.net
- RAIDSOnline.com (defunct)
