= Crime hotspots =

Areas that have a higher-than-average level of criminal activity

Crime hotspots are areas that have high crime intensity. These are usually visualized using a map. They are developed for researchers and analysts to examine geographic areas in relation to crime. Researchers and theorists examine the occurrence of hotspots in certain areas and why they happen, and analysts examine the techniques used to perform the research. Developing maps that contain hotspots are becoming a critical and influential tool for policing; they help develop knowledge and understanding of different areas in a city and possibly why crime occurs there.

Crime theories can be a useful guide for researchers and analyst, in regard to analyzing crime hotspots. There are many theories of crime that explain why crime occurs in certain places and why crime does not in others. Place theories look at crime at specific places, which can also be viewed as "points on a map." Another crime theory used in regard to crime hotspots is neighborhood theories. These theories view crime at a larger level, and in a larger viewing area. When viewing these types of areas, statistical information is typically used to determine hotspots. A widely used theory to explain crime is crime pattern theory. Crime pattern theory explains that crime is not random. Crime hotspots can help aid in determining spatial-temporal patterns. This theory allows making generalized statements about area hotspots, and hotspot areas can be predicted using crime pattern theory. When creating hotspots, theories that can help explain their occurrence should be evaluated to determine underlying causes.

Crime hotspots can be created using many different methods. Depending on what type of analysis needed, different methods should be employed. Two different methods to create hotspots are STAC (spatial and temporal analysis of crime) and nearest neighbor. Samuel Bates created STAC in the early 1990s. He created a tool that was designed to create a hotspot that contained a high area density of crime in a form of circle on a map. Clark and Evans examined spatial arrangements of points, creating the foundation of nearest neighbor. Clark and Evans created this method to study populations of plants and animals, but the method later was adapted to study crime patterns.

== Key concepts and critical developments ==
=== Nearest neighbor distances ===
Nearest neighbor distances, also known as the nearest neighbor index (NNI), was an area of interest of two botanists in the early 1950s, Philip Clark and Francis Evans. The two botanists began designing a formula to distinguish patterns of plants and animals and their distributions in their environment. Clark & Evans (1954) proposed a formula that would measure the spacing between plants and animals in a population that have a random distribution. If it was randomly distributed, a mean distance to the nearest neighbor could be developed. They defined a random distribution as "a set of points on a given area that have the same chance of occurring in any sub-area as any other point".

The methodology has been adapted into CrimeStat, a computer program built to analyze crime data. This program uses nearest neighbor index (NNI) to test for clustering to determine if there is a "hotspot" of crime. CrimeStat uses Clark's and Evans' theory and assumes that the distribution of crime used to perform global statistics have a random distribution. NNI compares observed distances between each point on a map and its nearest neighbor, or in other terms between each crime incident. The distances are then computed to create an average distance to determine if a crime pattern is randomly dispersed.

The following will explain in full detail the steps to calculate NNI according to Eck et al. (2005). First, crime incidents are geocoded on a map, and then the distance between one crime incident and its neighbor is calculated. Following that all the distances are added up and divided by the number of crime incidents on the map. According to Eck et al. (2005) this value is called the observed average nearest neighbor distance. Then a map of random incidents needs to be made covering the same area being analyzed. The same process of calculations needs to be made to make the average random nearest neighbor distance. These two numbers then create a ratio that compares the observed incidents to the random incidents that is called the nearest neighbor index.

Eck et al. (2005) further explain that if the results generated are less than 1.0 the crime incident data are considered clustered. If the results are equal to 1.0, the crime incident data are randomly distributed on the map. Finally a nearest neighbor index that is greater than 1.0, the data set shows a significant uniform crime pattern in then data set. Using the nearest neighbor index tests for complete randomness in a set of data points. This is useful for analysts because it is a technique that can measure changes of density over periods of time.

=== Spatial and temporal analysis of crime ellipses ===
The development of spatial and temporal analysis of crime ellipses, or STAC ellipses, started off as a program to determine a "hot circle" of crime incidents on crime maps. Samuel Bates created a formula that used a grid, rectangular or triangular, to create boundaries around an area. A radius then would be defined, and a circle would be created around a pinpoint of each crime incident. Following this, another grid is created that creates circles that are half of the original radius defined. This grid is then combined with the first grid to create a circle that contains the highest number of incidents, creating the "hot circle". This method created the foundation of what is now used to create hot spot ellipses.

Bate's original formula did not answer if the "hot circle" represented an area that clearly had a higher density of crime incidents or not. The formula had other problems as some "hot circles" would overlap and share same crime incidents. The "hot circles" also sometimes became elongated creating ovals. These problems led to the creation of the hot spot ellipses.

Ellipses are created now to show different levels of dispersion of crime incidents. They are always used in analysis to examine if there are any directional trends in the data set. First a user sets the size of the ellipses, typically for a crime data set on a map, miles are used. Following this, the user defines the standard deviation amount they want to use; this determines the number of data points wanted to be included in the ellipse. Typically one or two standard deviations are used; one standard deviation includes sixty-eight percent of the data, and two includes ninety-five percent of the data.

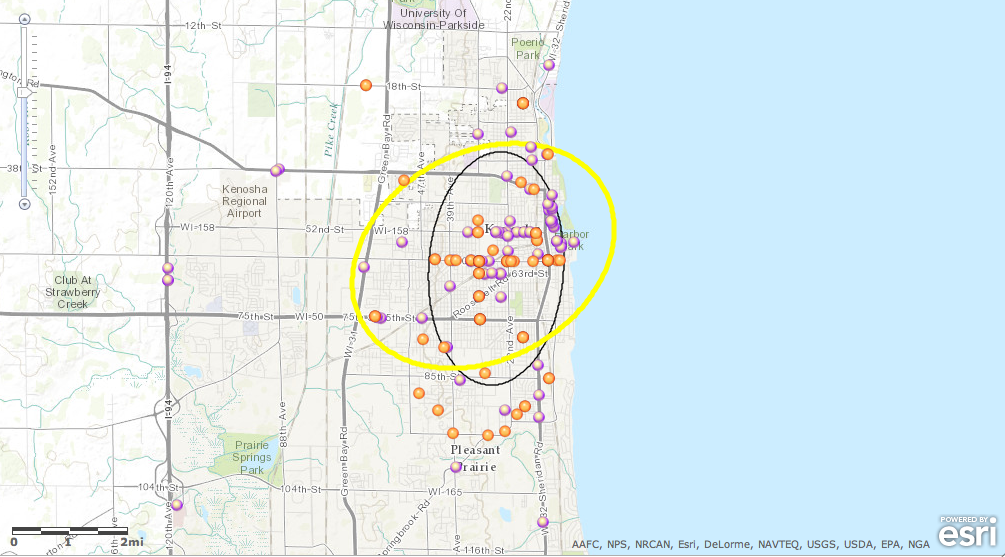
An example of STAC ellipses using two standard deviations. The black ellipse is a hotspot containing bars in the city of Kenosha, WI. The yellow ellipse is hotspot of DUI crimes for the city.

STAC ellipses have become an essential tool for analysts because of its efficiency and quickness. Studies typically use STAC ellipses to compare different data sets. Usually, areas of crime over periods of time are examined using the ellipses. Ellipses are called first-order statistics because they give analyst a starting point in examining a data set, while looking at the global statistics. Ellipses create a firm boundary for the data set that does not necessarily follow streets or neighborhood outlines. Therefore, when examining these ellipses, more statistical analyses should be used on top of the ellipses.

== Empirical support ==
=== Study 1: A microspatial analysis of robbery ===
A study that uses nearest neighbor index (NNI), and STAC Ellipses was completed for the City of Roanoke, Virginia. The study focuses on data reported to police on robberies that occurred between January 1, 2004, and December 31, 2007, with a total of 904 robberies reported. The purpose of this study was to determine if there were localized areas of robberies using hotspot analysis. The project first began by geo-coding all data onto a pinpoint map. The records of all robbery data came from the cities records and management system. After receiving satisfying results from geocoding the data, the data was then tested for global and spatial clustering. To test for spatial randomness, NNI was employed. For each year, 2004–2007, NNI was calculated and compared to a set of random points. Each year presents a NNI value of less than one. A value less than one, according to Eck et al. (2005) signifies that the clustering in the data set is consistent in its distribution. (Van Patten, McKeldin-Coner & Cox 2009). concluded that the data set has significant global spatial clustering that applies to the entire study population.

Following the testing of random clustering, using NNI hotspot analysis, was employed in the study. The study examined hotspot using many different spatial analysis techniques. The study used nearest neighbor hierarchal clustering (NNH) and other kernel density estimation (KDE). The following will look at the analysis of STAC ellipses in further details for the purpose of this section. Ellipses were developed for each year and then were further examined using different techniques. To create the ellipses, parameter settings were made based on the distance a person can travel on foot in approximately five minutes before looking for another form of transportation. A search radius of a quarter-mile was set for the data. Ellipses were made for the total number of robbery incidents, 904. Fifteen offenses per ellipse were used. Offenses were dropped to seven incidents per ellipse for a single year, and for two-year increments 7, 10, and 15 incidents were evaluated.

With all the different techniques employed in this study, it was concluded that STAC ellipses had the greatest reliability rate. It was determined that ellipses tend to be less accurate than other methods utilized; but, by far were more consistent. Van Patten, McKeldin-Coner & Cox (2009) concluded in this study that all methods utilized converge around the same areas of the city. This indicated there is random spatial clustering and agreement between the different methods employed. Using the hotspot analysis, different areas in the city were identified as "problem areas." There were areas that were determined to be crime generators and others attractors. Van Patten, McKeldin-Coner & Cox (2009) recommend that for areas of attractors increase in guardianship, and better place management should be the area of focus. Areas that contain crime generators would require more strategic approaches by police to make an impact.

=== Study 2: Early warning system project ===
In the early 1990s, crime began to rise in Chicago, Illinois at a significant rate. Many social groups asked the Community Safety Project to analyze relationships between alcohol selling establishments and crime in the city. To analyze data for the city, STAC ellipses were utilized. Location data of establishments with liquor licenses were retrieved from the City of Chicago Department of Revenue. Three types of liquor licenses were utilized: taverns, packaged goods, and incidental consumption. In 1993, there were a total 5,947 liquor licenses, with some establishments holding several. This data was then geocoded to create a pinpoint map of the respected locations. The study period of incidents was a six-month period from January–June 1993. There were 3,364 crime incidents reported to police over this period of time that occurred in or around the liquor establishments. These crimes included property crimes, drug offenses, and misdemeanors, but they were not limited to these categories. This data was also geo-coded into a pinpoint map for analysis.

In order to examine the concentration of liquor establishments and crime incidents, STAC ellipses were utilized. Five ellipses were generated that contained the densest areas of the liquor establishments. It was concluded that all ellipses were contained in the northern area of the city, centered on nightlife areas, a fashionable singles area, and shopping centers. Six ellipses were generated for the crime incident hotspots. Two of the ellipses were concentrated in areas of hotspots of liquor establishments, whereas four of them resided in areas of low-income census tracts. C. Block and R. Block concluded from these ellipses that hotspots of liquor establishments do not necessary attract the most crime.

This study further examined the statistics of crime related to liquor establishments by dissecting the number of each category that were included in each ellipse. It was determined that crimes of homicide were typically committed in low-income areas of the city that were not located near the liquor establishment hotspots. It was also determined that hotspot areas of crime in the liquor establishment hotspot were typically located on main streets of the city that attracted tourism, and also near rapid transit and singles' neighborhoods. Block & Block (1995) concluded the study by stating that density of liquor licenses and density of crime are not strongly related. These areas do attract crime, but they are not necessarily always the cause of crime.

== Criticism ==
Crime mapping and spatial analysis have become growing tools used by enforcement and other groups to analyze crime patterns. These tools have helped employ many crime prevention strategies throughout the United States, however they are still developing. Crime mapping, since it is still new, has many technical problems and also ethical issues that should not be overlooked when utilizing these tools. The following section will examine criticisms in the area of spatial analysis and the crime mapping of hotspots in a broad sense. Ratcliffe (2002) describes potential risks and problems that arise with the use of spatial analysis and crime mapping. Further, the impact of poverty, racism, are not included into crime mapping leading to this factor not being considered and individual peace officers bringing their own vices, judgement calls into the process. Crime is not a mythical construct, it has tangible root causes that range from financial poverty, to biological causes (hormonal imbalances, etc.) to desperation.

One of the first steps to analyzing crime, with the use of crime mapping, is the generation of pinpoint maps using the process of geocoding. This is the process of embedding coordinate information of crime incidents on city maps. Anyone can gain access to create maps on the Internet using the process of geocoding. Geocoding, however, has many errors that can occur in the process because the process is still being developed. This becomes a problem when utilizing spatial analysis because if the basis of the analysis is not correct, it can distort all the analysis utilized. This becomes a concern because information conveyed on maps, especially on the Internet for the public to view, may not necessarily be correct. Ratcliffe (2002) has created a list of possible problems that can arise with geocoding that should not be overlooked. He states that ten different errors could occur when geocoding, and they should not be overlooked.

- Out-of-date street directories that do not recognize new addresses or roads.
- Abbreviations of street and road names that cannot be recognized by geocoding software.
- Local name variations that do not match database entries.
- Address duplication problems that are caused by dozens of streets with the same name across a city.
- Non-existent addresses caused by typographical error.
- Line simplification that does not reflect the true curves of a street and places geocoded points in the wrong place.
- Noise in the address file that causes geocoding software to skip records.
- The inability to geocode non-address locations, such as 50m along a street, or in a rural location a few miles from town.
- General geocoding imprecision that places a point some distance from the actual address.
- Ambiguous or vague addresses that make it impossible to identify an actual address.

Other issues regarding crime mapping also include interpretation and applications of different spatial analysis tools. In regard to STAC ellipses, problems arise in application. Ellipses create firm boundaries for crime in regard to where an ellipses forms on a map. The boundaries of the ellipses do not follow movement of people, or an actual layout of a city; therefore outliers of the ellipses should also be examined when interpreting (Eck et al. 2005). Nearest neighbor index (NNI) also comes with its own set of problems. NNI performed for global spatial statistics do not always represent the same information on a local level. Eck et al. (2005) state that when using this method, other spatial analysis tools should be employed like Moran's I or Geary's C statistic. Clustering can occur on different levels of analysis; therefore, research on the right tools of analysis to use, should be taken seriously. There is no one tool that is necessarily better than the other.

Many police departments have adapted to placing crime maps and crime mapping software on their websites for public viewing. Therefore, privacy issues may surface. These maps present the public with direct information of where crime occurs and what type of crime occurred. This leads to a problem of privacy. Ratcliffe (2002) explains that victims of crimes and even sometimes offenders do not necessarily want their information portrayed to the public. He explains this using an example of a victim of burglary, stating they would not want their information and location online for public viewing because it could potentially advertise that their property is vulnerable.

== Crime prevention ==
Crime analysis is a fairly new development that is utilized in policing for crime prevention. STAC ellipses have developed throughout the years and have become a strategic tool used by enforcement. STAC ellipses were utilized by Chicago in the study titled Space, Place and Crime: Hot Spot Areas and Hot Places of Liquor-Related Crime. This study began to determine if liquor license establishments and crime-related activities were connected. The study concluded that these two categories were not necessarily related, but the study however helped enforcement to create strategic tactics to prevent crime in these areas.

In response to this study the police and community groups came together to try to solve and prevent crime in areas that STAC ellipses presented high crime incidents. In transit locations, police enforcement added a foot patrol and bicycle patrol to the area. Local community groups assisted police by informing the public of the crime problems in the area. When commuters would get off the train, they would inform them of the dangers in the area. In other areas that contained many vacant buildings, the city worked together to try and fill them with businesses or removed them. The police department also began utilizing spatial analysis to plot crime patterns, like the one in this study. This study gave police enforcement the tools and knowledge to begin their own crime analysis unit that is still being utilized today.

During this same time period, the Chicago Police Department and the Illinois Criminal Justice Information Authority completed another study. The study was called the Early Warning System Project. The purpose of the study was to help police identify which high-risk neighborhoods have high rates of homicide and gang-related violence. The study examined a twenty-three square mile area of Chicago that contained almost twenty percent of the 1864 murders from the years 1991–992. STAC ellipses, the spatial analysis tool, was employed to determine high-risk areas of the city. These ellipses were created to give police information regarding areas of high crime in relation to their locations, in order to create an "Early Warning System." The study concluded that gang-related territory needed to be monitored because of turf-wars and retaliation among different gangs. The police intervened creating a two step-process in identifying the specific problem areas, and then intervening with crime prevention strategies. The "Early Warning System" is continually updated to analyze crime patterns and has been placed on GeoArchives for other departments to use.

Following this study a Gang Violence Reduction Program was initiated in the twenty-three-mile area. The purpose of this project was to reduce gang-related violence through community mobilization. This group currently utilizes the "early warning system". The staff on this project uses the hotspot areas to target vulnerable youth in these areas. They have also created a team to monitor and supervise 200 known gang members, and also gives them access to education, jobs, and social services.

A study from Campbell Collaboration showed that criminality decreased when the police made patrols. These decreases were more evident in some crimes than others. The same study suggests that police departments should invest in patrolling hotspots for maintaining crime prevention programs.
