= Lafayette Police Department (Louisiana) =

Principal law enforcement agency in Lafayette, Louisiana

- Common name: City Police, City PD
- Abbreviation: LPD

Jurisdictional structure
- Operations jurisdiction: Lafayette, Louisiana, Louisiana, USA
- Area: 47.7 square miles (124 km^{2})
- Population: 120,623 (As of 2010)
- Legal jurisdiction: City of Lafayette, Louisiana
- General nature: Local civilian police

Operational structure
- Headquarters: 900 East University Avenue, Lafayette, Louisiana 70503
- Police Officers: 300
- Unsworn members: 100
- Agency executives: Paul Trouard, Chief of Police; Dorian Brabham, Deputy Chief
- Parent agency: Lafayette Consolidated Government
- Divisions: 3: Patrol; Services; Criminal Investigations
- Precincts: 4: Precinct 1 - Northwest Lafayette; Precinct 2 - Middle Lafayette; Precinct 3\Precinct 5 - South Lafayette; Precinct 4 - Northeast Lafayette

Facilities
- Stations: 1 Main Station (public Access) and 2 additional sub stations
- Parish Jails: 1
- Patrol Cars: Ford Police Interceptor Utility; Ford Crown Victoria Police Interceptor; Dodge Durango; Chevrolet Tahoe
- Motorcycles: Harley Davidson; Kawasaki
- Personal Transports: Segway
- Mounted Patrols: 1 Thoroughbred, 4 Thoroughbred/Percheron cross breeds.
- K-9 Units: German Shepherd and Belgian Malinois, 8 dogs total.

Website
- Official website

The Lafayette Police Department is the principal law enforcement agency in Lafayette, Louisiana, with the exception of the campus of University of Louisiana, which falls under the responsibility of the UL Police.

The Lafayette Police Department has a variety of specialized units, including SRO SWAT, Mounted Police, Traffic Unit, K-9 Unit, VIPER Unit, and one joint unit with the Lafayette Parish Sheriff's Office, Metro Crime Scene/Forensics. The LPD's new recruits are trained at the Lafayette Parish Sheriff's Office's Acadiana Law Enforcement Training Academy (ALETA). The LPD is CALEA (Commission on Accreditation for Law Enforcement Agencies) accredited.

== Divisions ==
=== Patrol ===
Patrol is the main and most visible division of the LPD. Along with regular patrol, the LPD has 4 specialized units in this division.

- Crime Suppression Unit - This unit specializes in ridding neighborhoods of crime. Through the use of covert actions and cooperation between police and citizens, this unit looks to rid neighborhoods of drug use, prostitution, gambling and gang activity.
- K-9 Unit - This unit utilizes seven police dogs to help curb crime in Lafayette. Seven dogs are dual purpose, and are trained in criminal apprehension and narcotics detection. One dog is specialized in narcotics detection only. The K-9 Unit responds to approximately 1,500 calls for service in a two-month period.
- Mounted Police Unit - This unit has one Thoroughbred and four Thoroughbred/Percheron horses. The horses are used for large crowd events, such as Mardi Gras, festivals, and parades. The most common use for the Mounted Unit is patrolling Downtown Lafayette at night, and clearing the street after the bars close.
- Traffic Unit - The traffic unit consists of six police officers specializing in traffic enforcement. These officers identify and patrol dangerous roads and intersections. The traffic officers investigate traffic crashes to help with the Patrol Division's overall mission.
- ATAC Unit - The Alcohol Traffic Action Campaign Unit consists of four officers specially trained in the detection and deterrence of drunk drivers. They respond to all major vehicle crashes to assess the drivers involved. When not responding to crashes, they aggressively patrol the streets of Lafayette to locate and arrest drunk drivers.
- Officers are issued the Glock 22 .40 S&W as the standard issue sidearm.

=== Services ===
The Services Division provides vital non-emergency services to the citizens of Lafayette.

- Training Unit - Upon successful completion of a Louisiana POST certified Academy, The Training Unit compliments each recruit's training with an additional 8-week Initial Phase Training program (classroom followed by reality based scenarios) and then four phases of road training lasting 14 weeks (without extensions). This division is also responsible for maintaining the in service training that is required annually of all employees (Officers and Civilians), updating training techniques for the continual changes in Law Enforcement procedure and organizing new training for all Officers employed by Lafayette PD. The Training Unit also organizes and hosts courses for numerous other agencies.
- Alarms and Permits - The LPD responds to all alarms in the City of Lafayette. The LPD is the agency that provides permits to alarm users, and also collects fines from alarm uses for false alarms.
- Online Reporting - The LPD has set up a system to report crimes online. The online report form is for non-emergencies only, any emergency will be handled by 911.
- Records Department - Every incident in the City of Lafayette is documented. The LPD is charged with filing and housing all of these records. Citizens may request a report for a fee.

=== Criminal Investigations ===
The Criminal Investigations unit is divided into four sections.

- Adult Crimes - This section investigates both crimes against property and crimes against persons. The investigators conduct investigations in a 30-day turnaround. Within 30 days the investigation must be complete unless it requires more work. The investigators prepare all cases for the District Attorney's office.
- Youth Crimes - Youth Crimes Investigators are responsible for following up on all crimes that happen to persons 17 and under. These investigators go through special training in order to handle the sensitive matter of these cases.
- Metro Crime Scene - A joint unit between the Lafayette Parish Sheriff's Office and the LPD, this unit uses state of the art technology to perform crime scene analysis. This unit provides forensic support and testing for the City and Parish of Lafayette, as well as other cities and parishes in South Louisiana.
- Metro Narcotics - Another joint unit between the LPSO and LPD, this unit looks to remove and keep illegal narcotics off the streets of Lafayette. Investigators from both agencies coordinate with the Louisiana National Guard's Counter Drug Program.

== Community Services ==
=== SWAT ===
The LPD operates a SWAT team of approximately 28 officers. These officers receive 60 hours of entry level SWAT training, as well as regular training throughout the year. The SWAT Team is prepared to support not only the LPD, but any other law enforcement agency requesting their help.

=== Lafayette Crime Stoppers ===
The LPD participates in the Lafayette Crime Stoppers program. The LPD encourages citizens to call the tip line to report crimes. Tipsters are kept completely anonymous, and any tip leading to a felony arrest or grand jury indictment will receive a cash reward. The number is: (337) 232-TIPS.

=== Operation FALCON ===
The Lafayette Police Department participated in the U.S. Marshals Operation FALCON (Federal And Local Cops Organized Nationally) to round up fugitives in Lafayette and Acadiana. The operation caught 165 fugitives across Acadiana.

== Recognition ==
The Lafayette Police Department is known nationally for the case of the Southside Rapist. From the early 1980s through 1995, a serial rapist preyed on women on the city's south side. After using all of the technology available to them, the LPD contacted and work with Dr. Kim Rossmo, who had developed a new type of profiling. The LPD was one of the first agencies to use geographic profiling to help find a suspect. Through geographic profiling and the DNA obtained from a cigarette butt, Randy Comeaux, a former sheriff's deputy, was found and convicted of the rapes.

== In popular culture ==
The South Side Rapist case and the LPD were featured on an episode of truTv's Forensic Files.

== See also ==
- Lafayette Parish Sheriff's Office
- University of Louisiana Police
- Lafayette City Marshal
