= Rossmo =

Rossmo is a surname. Notable people with the surname include:

- Kim Rossmo (born 1955), Canadian criminologist
- Riley Rossmo, Canadian comic book artist and illustrator

== See also ==
- Rossmo's formula, geographic profiling formula to predict where a serial criminal lives
