= ECRI =

ECRI may refer to:

- European Commission against Racism and Intolerance, the Council of Europe's independent human rights monitoring body
- European Credit Research Institute, analyses European retail financial services
- Economic Cycle Research Institute, an independent institute dedicated to economic cycle research, based in New York and London
- ECRI, formerly the Emergency Care Research Institute
- Environmental Criminology Research Inc., a crime analysis software developer
