= EGov (disambiguation) =

EGov or Egov may refer to:

- E-governance (short for electronic governance), the application of information technology for delivering government services.
- E-government (short for electronic government, also known as e-gov, Internet government, digital government, online government, or connected government) consists of the digital interactions between a citizen and their government (C2G), between governments and government agencies (G2G), between government and citizens (G2C), between government and employees (G2E), and between government and businesses/commerce (G2B).
- eGov.com (NIC) is an information service provider for the U.S. government.
