= CrimeAnalyst =

Extension for ArcGIS Desktop

- Developer(s): ESRI (UK)
- Stable release: English: 2.0, Dec 2009 / French/Spanish: 1.6, Feb 2009
- Operating system: Windows
- Type: GIS
- Website: www.esriuk.com

CrimeAnalyst is an extension for ArcGIS Desktop, a suite of geographic information system (GIS) software products. It provides added functionality for crime analysis and crime mapping. CrimeAnalyst is produced by ESRI (UK).

== Features ==
CrimeAnalyst functionality includes:

- Crime hotspot / density maps
- Temporal crime analysis / aoristic data clocks
- Spatial distribution and analysis
- Identifications of repeat victims of crime
- Identifying connections between related locations in a crime
- Calculating spatial statistics

== Development ==
Version	Significant changes	ArcGIS compatibility
1.1	ArcGIS 9.1 support	9.0 - 9.1
1.2	Crime incidents sequencing tool, hotspots contour tool, configuration management tool	9.1
1.3	Aoristic clock ArcToolbox tool, allowing process of generating data clocks to be automated via ModelBuilder	9.1
1.4	ArcGIS 9.2 support	9.2 - 9.2 SP3
1.5	Enhanced hotspot analysis performance, file geodatabase support, additional time formats support	9.2 SP 4
1.6	Removed requirement for Spatial Analyst, improved support for international projections	9.2 SP5 - 9.3.1
1.6 International	French and Spanish release	9.2 SP5 - 9.3.1
2.0	More ArcToolbox tools for use with ModelBuilder, rectangular 24hr or seasonal data clocks, point cluster renderer, temporal slider	9.2 SP6 – 9.3.1

== See also ==
ArcGIS Desktop
ProductivitySuite
