= The Criminologist =

The Criminologist may refer to:

- The Criminologist, the name of the official newsletter of the American Society of Criminology, published since 1976
- The Criminologist (magazine), a crime magazine published between 1967 and 1998
- The Criminologist (character), the narrator in The Rocky Horror Show and The Rocky Horror Picture Show
