= Ragnhild Sollund =

Norwegian professor and author

- Born: Ragnhild Aslaug Sollund; Bærum, Norway
- Education: University of Oslo
- Occupations: Professor of criminology, author
- Employer: University of Oslo
- Known for: Green criminology, Wildlife crime, Animal rights
- Notable work: Green Harms and Crimes (2015); Bare et dyr? (2021); Criminal Justice, Wildlife Conservation and Animal Rights in the Anthropocene (2024)

Ragnhild Aslaug Sollund is a Norwegian criminologist and professor at the University of Oslo known for her research in green criminology, wildlife crime, and animal rights within criminological frameworks. Her work explores the intersections of species justice, environmental harm, and law enforcement, contributing to the development of ecological and critical criminology.

== Early life and education ==
Sollund was born in Bærum, Norway. She studied at the University of Oslo, where she obtained her Cand.polit. degree in criminology in 1994 and her Dr.polit. degree in 2003 with a dissertation titled Immigrant women's occupational mobility. Her doctoral work examined structural barriers to immigrant women's professional advancement in Norway.

== Academic career ==
Sollund has been affiliated with the Department of Criminology and Sociology of Law at the University of Oslo since the 1990s. She was appointed Professor of Criminology in 2010 and served as Assistant Director of the department from 2010 to 2013. From 2008 to 2010 she was Research Professor at the Norwegian Social Research institute (NOVA), where she had previously worked as a Senior Researcher. Her research at NOVA and the Institute for Social Research (ISF) focused on migration, racial profiling, and gender in law enforcement.

She is recognised internationally as a leading scholar in green criminology, with work addressing environmental harm, wildlife trafficking, and animal victimisation. Sollund has led several major research projects funded by the Research Council of Norway, including CRIMEANTHROP (Criminal Justice, Wildlife Conservation and Animal Rights in the Anthropocene). She has been a guest lecturer at several universities, including the University of Havana and the Autonomous University of Tamaulipas (Mexico). She was a partner in the EFFACE project and has contributed to commissioned research for the European Union concerning environmental crime, including wildlife crime.

== Research ==
Her early publications addressed gender and immigration, including occupational mobility and ethnic minorities’ relations with the police. Later work increasingly focused on environmental and species justice, examining law enforcement of wildlife trade, ecological harm, and anthropocentrism.

Sollund’s research has been widely cited in discussions of speciesism, ecofeminism, and environmental justice. Her scholarship bridges critical criminology and environmental ethics, analysing human–animal relations as social and legal issues.

== Bibliography (selected) ==
- 2012: Transnational migration, gender and rights. Emerald Group Publishing Limited.
- 2012: Eco-global Crimes: Contemporary problems and Future Challenges. London: Ashgate. (together with Rune Ellefsen & Guri Larsen (eds.)).
- 2015: Green Harms and Crimes. Critical Criminology in a Changing World. Palgrave Macmillan.
- 2016: Fighting Environmental Crime in Europe and Beyond. The Role of the EU and Its Member States, London: Palgrave (with Christoph Stefes & Anna Rita Germani (eds.)).
- 2019: The crimes of wildlife trafficking. Issues of justice, legality and morality. Routledge.
- 2021: Bare et dyr? Solum bokvennen. Translated into Spanish as Solo un animal? in 2023
- 2022: Introdução à criminologia verde. Sao Paulo: Tirant lo Blanch Brasil.] (together with M.D. Budó, D. R. Goyes, A. Brisman, L. Natali (eds.)).
- 2024: Ragnhild Sollund and Martine S. B. Lie, Criminal Justice, Wildlife Conservation and Animal Rights in the Anthropocene. Bristol University Press.
- 2025: Ragnhild Sollund, Wildlife Trade and Animal Victimization. Parallell Harms and Crimes, Routledge.

Sollund has published about 100 academic papers for various international journals and edited collections. Her research has contributed to several art exhibitions and performances.

== Editorial and professional roles ==
Sollund has served on the editorial boards of numerous academic journals, including Critical Criminology, International Journal for Crime, Justice and Social Democracy, Justice, Power and Resistance, Fiat Justisia, Forensic Science International: Animals and Environments, and Politics and Animals.

== Awards and recognition ==
- 2021 – Lifetime Achievement Award, Division of Critical Criminology and Social Justice, American Society of Criminology
- 2016 – Choice Outstanding Academic Titles, American Library Association for Green Harms and Crimes
- 2015 – Energy Globe Award (Norway) for research on illegal wildlife trade
