= Jeff Fraser =

American entrepreneur

- Born: Jeffrey S. Fraser
- Education: Friends University, Wichita, Kansas
- Occupation: Co-founder
- Organization: NIC Inc.

Jeff Fraser is an American entrepreneur and the co-founder of NIC Inc. In 1992, he formed the Kansas Information Consortium, which focused on providing information services to the Kansas government. Over time they became focused on assisting the federal and state government. In 1999, Kansas Information Consortium became NIC Inc. Fraser retired from his position in 2008, becoming an honorary chairman at the company. He faced an SEC complaint involving undisclosed perks provided to him while CEO of NIC Inc resulting in Fraser being banned from being an officer or director of a public company.

Fraser is the owner of Valdez Heli-ski Guides.

== Education ==
Fraser studied at Friends University in Wichita, Kansas, where he received a B.S. in human resource management and an M.S. in information systems.

== Career ==
Fraser was a co-founder of the Kansas Information Consortium in 1992. The company was formed in Topeka, Kansas and since then has provided information services for federal and state government in the United States. As part of its services, Fraser oversaw 3,5000 government IT contracts for large parts of the IT infrastructure in the US.

He was chairman from the company's formation in the early 1990s until May 2008. In 1999, he oversaw the company's rebrand from Kansas Information Consortium to the National Information Consortium and also it going public on the NASDAQ in the same year. He returned to CEO of the company in 2002, remaining in the position for six years. NIC Inc. was created by merging Kansas Information Consortium, Nebraska Interactive, Indiana Interactive, Arkansas Information Consortium and National Information Consortium, all of which were founded by Fraser.

When he became CEO, NIC Inc. was responsible for managing the websites of seventeen states in the United States and eight local governments. During an interview with Bloomberg, Fraser explained how the website offered a self-funding method, rather than charging the client. Whether sending a payment, taxation or renewing professional licenses, NIC received payment from the government rather than the consumer. During the early days of the Internet, this was a definitive move and one now seen across the United States and western world.

In 2004, Fraser received the Ernst & Young Entrepreneur of the Year Award for his work as co-founder and CEO of NIC Inc. He won the award in the technology category. In 2007, revenues for NIC Inc. grew by 19.5 percent for Q3 against the previous year.

During his tenure as CEO, the company roughly served between 60 and 70 million Americans, according to SeekingAlpha. Fraser aimed to expand this to around 120 million within a decade.

The company reached market capitalization of $1.27 billion in 2014. During the same year, the company's pre-employment screening program (PSP) customer service team was awarded a Bronze Stevie Award for supporting for the U.S. Department of Transportation Federal Motor Carrier Safety Administration (FMCSA).

In 2011, Fraser settled a complaint with the SEC and agreed to pay $1,184,246 in disgorgement, $358,844 in prejudgment interest, and a $500,000 penalty, and consented to an order barring him from being an officer or director of a public company. The SEC's complaints alleged that Fraser, who did not have a personal credit card, routinely charged living expenses on NIC credit cards and submitted expense vouchers falsely claiming personal items were business-related in order to have NIC pay for these personal expenses. Fraser also sought reimbursement for certain expenses he had not incurred.

== The Tsaina Lodge ==
The Tsaina Lodge is located in Valdez, Alaska. It was a stopping point for truckers in the 1940s and also those trekking Alaska's Thompson Pass. In March 2012, the lodge reopened after it was purchased and restored by Fraser and his family. Before rebuilding the lodge, Fraser photographed the original structure and saved memorabilia to include in the rebuilding process. Some of the lodge's interior woodwork was also repurposed and used to create the new bar.

ESPN stated that the lodge is considered by many as the birthplace of free skiing in Alaska, which is now home to many events such as the Freeride World Tour. Tsaina Lodge is known for more than just winter sports; it is also recognized for fishing, offering heli-fishing around Valdez's Thompson Pass.

After the reopening, Outside magazine announced the lodge was the runner up as the "Best New Adventure Lodge".
