= Mobility triangles =

Spatial pattern of crimes

In criminology, Mobility triangles are the triangular areas formed by the locations of the victim's home, the offender's home and the crime. They are used to describe spatial patterns of crimes, and to facilitate the classification of crimes based on location. Implicit in the concept is the assumption that the homes of the victim and the offender form anchor points that govern the crime location. Mobility triangles are related to the criminological frameworks of routine activity theory and environmental criminology.

== History ==
Mobility triangles were first described by Burgess in 1925 to describe incidents in which the offender's home and crime location were in different neighborhoods.

== Analysis ==
Following Burgess, mobility triangles were qualitatively analyzed in terms of whether the points of the triangle were in the same or different neighborhoods. The combinations of same and different neighborhood for the points of the triangle are termed mobility triangle typologies. More recently, quantitative analyses of mobility triangles have been undertaken, with statistical analyses based on triangle edge distances, and numbers of offenders and victims.
