= Criminal Reduction Utilising Statistical History =

Predictive analysis system

Criminal Reduction Utilising Statistical History (CRUSH) is an IBM predictive analytics system that attempts to predict the location of future crimes. It was developed as part of the Blue CRUSH program in conjunction with Memphis Police Department and the University of Memphis Criminology and Research department.

As of July 2010, it was being trialed by two British police forces.

In 2014 a modified version of the system, called CRASH (Crash Reduction Analysing Statistical History) became operational in Tennessee aimed at preventing vehicle accidents.

== See also ==
- Crime mapping
