= Geographic profiling =

Criminal investigative methodology

Geographic profiling is a criminal investigative methodology that analyzes the locations of a connected series of crimes to determine the most probable area of offender residence. By incorporating both qualitative and quantitative methods, it assists in understanding spatial behaviour of an offender and focusing the investigation to a smaller area of the community. Typically used in cases of serial murder or rape (but also arson, bombing, robbery, terrorism and other crimes), the technique helps police detectives prioritize information in large-scale major crime investigations that often involve hundreds or thousands of suspects and tips.

In addition to determining the offender's most likely area of residence, an understanding of the spatial pattern of a crime series and the characteristics of the crime sites can tell investigators other useful information, such as whether the crime was opportunistic and the degree of offender familiarity with the crime location. This is based on the connection between an offender's behavior and his or her non-criminal life.

Geographic profiling is growing in popularity and, combined with offender profiling, can be a helpful tool in the investigation of serial crime.

== Development ==
While the use of spatial analysis methods in police investigations goes back many years (e.g. detectives gathered around a large city map with pins stuck in it), the formalized process known today as geographic profiling originated out of research conducted at Simon Fraser University's School of Criminology in British Columbia, Canada, in 1989.

Geographic profiling is based on the assumption that offenders tend to select victims and commit crimes near their homes. The technique has now spread to several US, Canadian, British, and other European law enforcement agencies. Originally designed for violent crime investigations, it is increasingly being used on property crime.

Through numerous research studies, more importance has been placed on the journeys offenders habitually make to determine the spatial range of criminal activity. Because of their familiarity, these areas become a comfort zone within which offenders prefer to commit crimes. Consequently, criminal acts follow a distance-decay function, whereby people are more likely to commit offences near their homes. An exception to this is a buffer zone around offenders' homes, within which they avoid committing crimes in case they are identified by a neighbour.

=== Central concepts ===
The theoretical foundation of geographic profiling is in environmental criminology. Key concepts include:

- Journey-to-crime

Supports the notion that crimes are likely to occur closer to an offender’s home and follow a distance-decay function (DDF) with crimes less likely to occur the further away an offender is from their home base. It is concerned with the ‘distance of crime’ and that offenders will in general travel limited distances to commit their crimes.

- Routine activity theory

Originally developed by Cohen and Felson (1979), the primary principle is that the offender and victim must intersect in time and space for a crime to occur. This approach focuses on the concept that crime occurs when an opportunity is taken within both parties’ non-criminal spatial activity. An activity space may consist of the regular areas an offender travels such as work, school, home or recreational areas.

- Rational choice theory

Concepts relating to the explanation of spatial behaviour include the least-effort principle where offenders are more likely to act on the first or opportunity and the idea of a buffer zone. It exhibits a constant tension between the offender’s desire to divert attention from his home base and the desire to travel no further than necessary to commit crimes.

- Crime pattern theory

Developed by Canadian environmental criminologists Paul and Patricia Brantingham, the theory exerts the strongest influence in geographic profiling. It suggests that crime sites and opportunities are not random. There is an emphasis in the interaction between the offender’s mental map of spatial surroundings and the allotment of victims (target backcloth).

Serial crimes are the easiest to develop geographic profiles for, since each crime contains new spatial information and provides additional data including the fact that the crime area tends to enlarge with an increase of comfort and confidence. The initial hunt and criminal acts are likely to occur close to the offender's home or workplace. As the success rate increases, the criminal's growing confidence will lead him/her to seek his prey further from home. Crimes that are suitable for analysis are those that are predatory and involve some spatial decision-making process such as the area for hunting targets, travel routes, mode of transportation and even body dump sites.

Another leading researcher in this area is David Canter whose approach to geographic profiling is based on the circle theory of environmental range. In 1993, Canter and Larkin developed two models of offender behaviour: the marauder and commuter models. The distinction is that marauders operate close to the offender's home while commuters commit crimes far outside the habitual zone. It hopes to differentiate the two types of serial offenders by studying the relationship of the criminal spatial behaviour with the offender's place of residence.

== Considerations ==
In developing a geographic profile, there are important factors to consider:

- Crime locations

A crime will contain evidence. The evidence found at the location provides information leading to the offender and victim's prior locations, clues as to where they may have gone, as well as information depicting what happened. Collecting and comparing clues from numerous crime locations influences the development of the offender's patterns.

- Offender type

According to Dr. Kim Rossmo there are four different types of offenders with regard to geographic profiling. Hunter: the hunter singles out a specific victim without leaving his home territory. He will commit crimes where he lives. Poacher: a poacher will travel out of his home territory to do his hunting. Troller: A troller will realize an opportunistic encounter while occupied in other activities and then strike. Trapper: a trapper will draw the victim to him using different seemingly harmless situations.

- Hunting Methods

Hunting process can be broken down into two parts. (1) The search for a suitable victim, and (2) the method of attack.

- Target backcloth (the spatial opportunity structure of crime sites)

“Target or victim backcloth is important for an understanding of the geometric arrangement of crime sites; it is the equivalent of the spatial opportunity structure (Brantingham & Brantingham, 1993b). It is configured by both geographic and temporal distribution of “suitable” (as seen from the offenders perspective) crime targets or victims across the physical landscape. The availability of particular targets may vary significantly according to neighborhood, area, or even city, and is influenced by time, day of week, and season; hence, the term structural backcloth is also used.”

- Arterial roads and highways

Large roads and highways play a huge part in crime strictly because of how both criminals and victims are forced to travel. Crimes will often cluster around freeway exits and entrances.

- Bus stops and train stations

These are two forms of rapid transportation that may also be used by offenders and victims and can be hot spots in certain areas.

- Physical and psychological boundaries

Offender and victim alike are both restrained by physical boundaries such as rivers, lakes, oceans or highways. Psychological boundaries may also affect movement, for example a black offender may not travel into a white neighborhood for fear of being identified.

- Land use
- Neighbourhood demographics

Certain offenders prefer a certain ethnicity of victim, if so then they may hunt in different neighborhoods affecting spatial crime patterns.

- Routine activities of victims

Understanding the routine of a victim may provide insight into how the offender searches for his victims.

- Singularities
- Displacement

Incorporating these factors in a profile can lead to a geographic pattern where it sheds light on an offender's mobility, method of transportation, ability to navigate boundaries and most importantly, the possible residential location. It is important to recognize such spatial intentionality, to determine the offender's comfort zone and his desire to commit crimes in locations where he feel a sense of familiarity. However, the reality may be more complex since an offender may have multiple spatial anchor points, such as home, workplace or the residence of his significant other.

== Tools ==
Geographic profiling is an investigative tool that can be seen as a strategic information management system to assist police with the large volume of information throughout an investigation. It concentrates its focus on the geographic aspects of the crime and was developed in response to the demands of solving serial crimes. In response, Rossmo developed a computerized geographic profiling algorithm called criminal geographic targeting (CGT) which assess the spatial characteristics of crimes. It analyzes the geographic coordinates of the offender's crimes and produces a color map which assigns probabilities to different points for the most likely area of the offender's home base. CGT has been patented and integrated into a specialized crime analysis software product called Rigel. The Rigel product is developed by the software company Environmental Criminology Research Inc. (ECRI), which Rossmo co-founded.

Geographic profilers often employ tools such as Rigel, CrimeStat or Gemini to perform geographic analysis. System inputs are crime location addresses or coordinates, often entered through a geographic information system (GIS). Output is a jeopardy surface (three-dimensional probability surface) or color geoprofile, which depicts the most likely areas of offender residence or search base. These programs assist crime analysts and investigators to focus their resources more effectively by highlighting the crucial geographic areas.

== Geographic Profiling Analysis (GPA) training ==
Geographic profiling is a sub-type of offender or criminal profiling (the inference of offender characteristics from offence characteristics). It is therefore related to psychological or behavioral profiling. If psychological profiling is the "who," geographic profiling is the "where." All certified geographic profilers are members of the International Criminal Investigative Analysis Fellowship (ICIAF), a professional profiling organization first begun by investigators trained by the FBI in the mid-1980s.

A Geographic Profiling Analysis (GPA) training programme has also been created and is governed by the Committee for GPA Training and Certification (CGPATC). The program has been designed so that geographic profiling analysis remains a recognized law enforcement tool; a meaningful certification for crime analysts and detectives; a standard of quality through adequate qualifications in law enforcements is maintained; and finally to establish an ethical code of conduct.

== Limitations ==
Although geographic profiling is a useful tool for assisting investigations, e.g. in prioritizing suspects, like any other models there are certain limitations:

- Benefit in the case of a single crime may be limited.
- It may not distinguish between multiple offenders operating in the same area and following similar modi operandi.
- Although computer systems can be highly sophisticated, they cannot analyze all the information involved in a crime series and they are only as good as the accuracy of their algorithms' underlying assumptions.
- In crimes against lucrative targets the residential location of the perpetrator may be of small significance compared to the location of the target.

== See also ==
- Rossmo's formula, a geographic profiling formula to predict where a serial criminal lives
- Environmental Criminology Research Inc., Developer of Rigel, a software package that utilizes Rossmo's formula

General:

- Crime mapping
- Offender profiling
