= Environmental criminology =

Environmental criminology focuses on criminal patterns within particular built environments and analyzes the impacts of these external variables on people's cognitive behavior. It forms a part of criminology's Positivist School in that it applies the scientific method to examine the society that causes crime.

== Theory ==
Environmental criminology is the study of crime, criminality, and victimization as they relate, first, to particular places, and secondly, to the way that individuals and organizations shape their activities spatially, and in so doing are in turn influenced by place-based or spatial factors.

In 1971, C. Ray Jeffery published "Crime Prevention Through Environmental Design", in which he examined the role that immediate environments play in crime and suggested a range of strategies for reducing crime by modifying immediate environments. He also coined the term "environmental criminology".

Within fifteen years of the publication of Jeffery’s book, most of the seminal approaches of environmental criminology had appeared, with later developments largely building on these foundations.

One such environmental criminology approach was developed in the 1980s, by Paul and Patricia Brantingham, putting focus of criminological study on environmental or context factors that can influence criminal activity. These include space (geography), time, law, offender, and target or victim. These five components are a necessary and sufficient condition, for without one, the other four, even together, will not constitute a criminal incident. Despite the obvious multi-faceted nature of crime, scholars and practitioners often attempt to study them separately. For instance, lawyers and political scientists focus on the legal dimension; sociologists, psychologists and civil rights groups generally look to the offenders and victims, while geographers concentrate upon the location of the event. Environmental criminologists examine the place and the time when the crime happened. They are interested in land usage, traffic patterns and street design, and the daily activities and movements of victims and offenders. Environmental criminologists often use maps to look for crime patterns, for example, using metric topology.

== Practical applications ==
The study of the spatial patterns of crime and criminality has a long history. In the Chicago School, Robert Ezra Park, Ernest Burgess, and other urban sociologists developed the concentric zones model, and considered geographic factors in study of juvenile delinquency.

Geography was also considered in law enforcement, through use of large pin maps to show where crime incidents occurred. Mapping and analysis of crime is now entering a new phase with the use of computerized crime mapping systems by the police and researchers, with environmental criminology theories playing an important part in how crime patterns are understood. Crime mapping technology allows law enforcement to collect data that will pinpoint the geography of crime incidents within a geographical area. This technique has proven to be very useful when it comes to informing officers of the location of a crime, making resource assignment decisions, assessing interventions, informing communities about crime activity, and identifying where calls are coming from in an area. Other practical applications of environmental criminology theory include geographic profiling, which is premised on the idea that criminals take into account geographic factors in deciding where to commit crimes.

Crime prevention through environmental design (CPTED) is another practical application, based on the title of Jeffery's earlier publication, promotes the idea that situational factors such as the environment (poor lighting or design of circulation spaces) can make crime more likely to occur at a particular time and place. CPTED measures to reduce the likelihood can include added lighting, making the place less conducive for crime.

Concentrated areas of high level of crime, known as crime hot spots, may have situational factors that help explain why the particular place is a problem. Could be that the place is poorly supervised, has poor "place management", has poor lighting or other characteristics. Changing some of those situational factors may help reduce levels of crime in that place.

The Routine Activity Theory was developed by Marcus Felson and Lawrence E. Cohen in the late 1970's. Unlike other theories concerning crime, The Routine Activity Theory studies crime as an event that relates to the crimes environment and ecological process that happened.

During and after World War II, when states were expanding crime was raising significantly due to areas society was making. Therefore, making certain places easy access for crime. Automobiles were booming, making it easier to get around. It enables criminals to be able to go and pursue crime. Social changes in society, much like college, urbanization, suburbanization, lifestyles, and woman working are big contributors to environmental crime.

The broken windows theory is the idea that there is importance to disorder when it comes to assisting and generating crime. General disorder leads to fear from a community, which allows for more crime to be committed because of decreased social control. In other words, an un-fixed broken window will ultimately lead to more broken windows. Smaller problems such as drugs or gangs in a community that are not being actively taken care of by the police cause people to leave these areas out of fear. As the area becomes scarcer in population, the crime will progressively become more serious.

== See also ==
- Crime pattern theory
- Environmental justice
- Environmental law
- Green criminology
- List of environmental lawsuits
- Mobility triangles
