= New World Systems =

- Type: Corporation
- Industry: Software
- Founded: 1981
- Founder: Larry D. Leinweber
- Headquarters: Troy, Michigan
- Number of locations: 22 (2014)
- Area served: United States
- Products: Public sector software
- Number of employees: 400 (2014)
- Parent: Tyler Technologies
- Website: www.tylertech.com/solutions-products/new-world-public-safety-product-suite

New World Systems is a public sector software company based in Troy, Michigan and a major manufacturer of computer-aided dispatch software that is primarily used in the United States. It became a part of Tyler Technologies in 2015. Troy, Michigan, is now the headquarters for Tyler's Public Safety Division and the home of the former New World ERP financial employees.

== History ==
New World Systems was founded in 1981 in Troy, Michigan by Larry D. Leinweber.

In November 2015 New World Systems was acquired by Tyler Technologies.

== Products ==
Aegis is software that includes Law Enforcement, Fire and EMS Records Management, Computer Aided Dispatch (CAD), Mobile Computing, Corrections Management, Web-based Information Sharing and Decision Support available on the Microsoft Windows platform and the IBM i platform. Aegis CAD is considered a top-tier option within the United States.

== See also ==
- Computer-aided dispatch
- Records Management
