= RAIDS Online =

- Developer: BAIR Analytics Inc.
- Website: www.raidsonline.com

RAIDS Online is a free public crime map developed by BAIR Analytics. It aims to reduce information requests and improve trust between law enforcement entities and their public with data accuracy and transparency.

The map enables users to view nearby crime activity. Users can choose different data layers to see how demographics and socio-economic factors affect crime. Citizens or neighborhood watch groups can sign up for reports on their areas of activity.

At this time, attempting to access RAIDS Online from most community police webpages will result in an Error 404 message.

== Development ==
- RAIDS Online iPhone mobile app

== Features ==
- Automated data feed
- Works with any RMS/CAD
- Integrated tips
- User guide
- Data management for admins
- Email alerts
- Basic analytics
- Embeddable widget for website
- Unlimited historic data
- Hotspot maps
- Free web tips
- Proximity search
- Data grid view of data
- Temporal topology chart
- Metadata/data transparency
- Accuracy
- Ability to upload data on any schedule

== See also ==
- Crime mapping
