= CrimeView =

Crime analysis software

- Developer: The Omega Group
- Stable release: 4.3 / 2008
- Operating system: Windows 2000, Windows XP
- Type: GIS

CrimeView is a crime analysis, mapping and reporting software extension to ArcGIS. It is designed for the detailed study of patterns of crime as they relate to geography and time.

== Development ==
CrimeView was first created by The Omega Group in 1996 as a desktop application. Under the guidance of Milan Mueller, CEO and owner of The Omega Group, developer Bruce Silva created CrimeView in ESRI's ArcView GIS Avenue programming language. The software has since undergone numerous transformations and is currently based in the .NET and Silverlight programming environments. CrimeView was migrated to the ArcGIS Server environment in 2008, enabling analyses to be performed through a Web browser through the use of a client/server-based application.

The first working CrimeView application was installed at Indio Police Department in California in August 1996. Since that time approximately five hundred agencies in forty-six different states have implemented CrimeView applications, making it one of the most popular off the shelf crime mapping solutions in the world.

== Background ==
CrimeView connects to an agency's existing crime records or reporting system and automatically converts tabular data into locations on a map. Many police departments use CrimeView as part of their CompStat process and Watch Commanders utilize the software in order to help determine the placement of officers in the field.

CrimeView was created to support recent trends of policing such as problem-oriented policing, Community Policing and the more recent Intelligence-Led Policing. The Lincoln Police Department in Nebraska has been successful in apprehending several repeat offenders through the use of "Hot Spot", "Cyclical Reporting" and Threshold Alert routines.

=== Servers and Hosting ===
CrimeView is implemented through any law enforcement agency's Intranet as CrimeView Server or be shared with the general public through the Internet as CrimeView Community. These two server based or hosted versions of the software are compatible with most standard Web browsers and are designed to support Community Oriented Policing efforts throughout the United States.

CrimeMapping.com was launched in May 2008 as a nationwide hosted public crime mapping service based on the CrimeView and CrimeView Community models. Users can map out crimes for their area and receive free crime alerts regarding recent activity through the use of CrimeMapping.com.

=== Functions ===
Some CrimeView functions include:

Queries - by any attribute, geographic boundary, or proximity to an address or landmark feature.

Density Mapping - standardized density, hot spot maps, repeat calls.

Cyclical Reports - combines and saves queries, reports, and graphs to run anytime.

Exception Reporting – create COMPSTAT style comparison reports.

Threshold Alert – e-mail alerts (including maps and reports) when activity thresholds have been reached.

Temporal Heat Index - Depict the total calls per hour and DOW graphically to identify temporal hot spots

Analyses - crime rate generator, spatial trends.

Order Labels - plots specific incidents in the order they occur with directionals.

Statistical Profiler - profiles a data series to help determine where and when the next event is most likely to occur.

== Discussion ==
San Juan Police Department in Puerto Rico implemented CrimeView Desktop. The San Juan application was launched in 2007 and represents the first CrimeView database implemented in a Spanish speaking region. Geographic Mapping Technologies was integral in bringing CrimeView to San Juan.

CrimeView Server was implemented for the Greek National Police Department in 2010 and serves the entire country of Greece. St. John Police Force launched CrimeView in 2009 and has achieved a double digit reduction in crime which is outlined in an ESRI Case Study.

CrimeView's Threshold Alert function is currently being used by Lincoln Police Department as a daily reporting mechanism. The Threshold Alert routine allows the end user to set a threshold for any type of crime by any geography. If the threshold is exceeded during a specified time period an e-mail alert is sent out to designated recipients. By setting the threshold to one Lincoln Police Department has been able to create daily reports that are utilized by command staff in the decision making process.

The Virginia Beach Police Department was able to apprehend a serial rapist in 2006 through the use of CrimeView's hot spot and reporting functions. Hot spots maps were created showing where and when the most incidents were occurring. The department placed additional officers at these locations during peak activity times and were able to catch a sexual predator just before he struck again.

== See also ==
- Crime mapping
