= Rossmo's formula =

Criminal profiling tool

Rossmo's formula is a geographic profiling formula to predict where a serial criminal lives. It relies upon the tendency of criminals to not commit crimes near places where they might be recognized, but also to not travel excessively long distances. The formula was developed and patented in 1996 by criminologist Kim Rossmo and integrated into a specialized crime analysis software product called Rigel. The Rigel product is developed by the software company Environmental Criminology Research Inc. (ECRI), which Rossmo co-founded.

== Formula ==
Imagine a map with an overlaying grid of little squares named sectors. If this map is a raster image file on a computer, these sectors are pixels. A sector $S_{i,j}$ is the square on row i and column j, located at coordinates $(X_{i},Y_{j})$. The following function gives the probability $p_{i,j}$ of the position of the serial criminal residing within a specific sector (or point) $(X_{i},Y_{j})$:

$$p_{i,j}=k \sum_{n=1}^{T}
\left [
\underbrace{
\frac{\phi_{ij}}{
(|X_i-x_n| + |Y_j-y_n|)^f
}
}_{ 1^{\mathrm{st}}\mathrm{\;term} }
+
\underbrace{
\frac{(1-\phi_{ij})(B^{g-f})}{
(2B - |X_i - x_n| - |Y_j-y_n|)^g
}
}_{ 2^{\mathrm{nd}}\mathrm{\;term} }
\right ],$$
where:
$$\phi_{ij}=
\begin{cases}
1, & \mathrm{\quad if\;} ( |X_i - x_n|+ |Y_j - y_n|) > B \quad \\
0, & \mathrm{\quad else}
\end{cases}$$

Here the summation is over past crimes located at coordinates $(x_{n},y_{n})$, $n=1,\ldots,T$, where $T$ is the number of past crimes. Furthermore, $\phi_{ij}$ is an indicator function that returns 0 when a point $(X_{i},Y_{j})$ is an element of the buffer zone B (the neighborhood of a criminal residence that is swept out by a radius of B from its center). The indicator $\phi_{ij}$ allows the computation to switch between the two terms. If a crime occurs within the buffer zone, then $\phi_{ij}=0$ and, thus, the first term does not contribute to the overall result. This is a prerogative for defining the first term in the case when the distance between a point (or pixel) becomes equal to zero. When $\phi_{ij}=1$, the 1st term is used to calculate $p_{i,j}$.

$|X_i - x_n| + |Y_j - y_n|$ is the Manhattan distance between a point $(X_{i},Y_{j})$ and the n-th crime site $(x_{n},y_{n})$, $n=1,\ldots,T$.

Finally, $k>0$ is an appopriately selected normalization constant to ensure that $\sum_i \sum_j p_{i,j} \leq 1$.

== Explanation ==
The summation in the formula consists of two terms. The first term describes the idea of decreasing probability with increasing distance. The second term deals with the concept of a buffer zone. The variable $\phi$ is used to put more weight on one of the two ideas. The variable $B$ describes the radius of the buffer zone. The constant $k$ is empirically determined.

The main idea of the formula is that the probability of crimes first increases as one moves through the buffer zone away from the hotzone, but decreases afterwards. The variable $f$ can be chosen so that it works best on data of past crimes. The same idea goes for the variable $g$.

The distance is calculated with the Manhattan distance formula.

== Applications ==
The formula has been applied to fields other than forensics. Because of the buffer zone idea, the formula works well for studies concerning predatory animals such as white sharks.

This formula and math behind it were used in crime detecting in the "Pilot" episode of the television series Numb3rs and in the 100th episode of the same show, called "Disturbed".
