= Crime opportunity theory =

Theory in criminology

Crime opportunity theory suggests that offenders make rational choices and thus choose targets that offer a high reward with little effort and risk. The occurrence of a crime depends on two things: the presence of at least one motivated offender who is ready and willing to engage in a crime, and the conditions of the environment in which that offender is situated, to wit, opportunities for crime. All crimes require opportunity but not every opportunity is followed by crime. Similarly, a motivated offender is necessary for the commission of a crime but not sufficient. A large part of this theory focuses on how variations in lifestyle or routine activities affect the opportunities for crime.

Opportunity thus becomes the limiting factor that determines the outcome in environments prone to crime because the offender generally has little or no control over the conditions of the environment and the conditions that permit particular crimes are often rare, unlikely, or preventable.

== Theory ==
Daily activities create the convergence in time and space of the three elements necessary for a crime to occur: motivated offenders, suitable targets, and the absence of capable guardians. The theory argues that available opportunities are an important component in the crime calculus. Choices in lifestyle on the part of potential victims may create or curtail crime opportunities for the motivated offender.

The rational choice perspective tries to understand crime from the perspective of the offender. It is directly concerned with the thinking processes of offenders, how they evaluate criminal opportunities, why they decide to do one thing rather than another, and why they choose to obtain their ends by criminal and not legal means. This perspective has helped to explain why displacement does not always occur and has helped develop different ways to reduce opportunities for crime.

According to criminologist C. Ray Jeffery, crime results partly from the opportunities presented by a physical environment, so it is possible to alter the physical environment so that crime is less likely to occur. He argues that sociologists overstated the social causes of crime and neglected both biological and environmental determinants.

Situational crime prevention introduces discrete managerial and environmental changes to reduce the opportunity for crimes to occur. It is focused on the settings for crime and seeks to predict the occurrence of crime. It suggests that much offending can appropriately be viewed not simply as the product of deep social, economic, and psychological causes but also as the result of deliberate choices by individuals. Therefore, by making criminal action less attractive to offenders, criminal behavior can be curved.

The opportunity theory has direct application to crime prevention. Concepts like problem-oriented policing, defensible space architecture, crime prevention through environmental design, and situational crime prevention seek to reduce opportunities for crime for particular kinds of targets, places, and classes of victims. Each is concerned with preventing very specific kinds of crime and none of the four attempts to improve human character. Most important, all four seek to block crime in practical, natural, and simple ways, at low social and economic costs.

=== Analysis of incidents ===
Several studies have been conducted inside and outside of the United States illustrating opportunity as a significant factor in the commission of crime. One such study is entitled The Role of Opportunity in Crime Prevention and Possible Threats of Crime Control Benefits.

In Germany during the 1980s, a study of motorcycle theft identified opportunity as a crucial element. The thefts of motorbikes had drastically declined from about 150,000 in 1980 to about 50,000 in 1986. This tremendous decline was the result of a new law passed in 1980 making it illegal to ride a motorbike in Germany without a helmet. The law's strict enforcement led to the huge decline in motorcycle thefts.

There is some limited evidence of displacement because between 1980 and 1983 thefts of cars went up from about 64,000 to 70,000 and the theft of bicycles also saw a noticeable increase. Altogether, it was clear that, at best, only a small proportion of the 100,000 motorbike thefts saved by the helmet laws were displaced to thefts of other vehicles.

In the United States, a study was completed to investigate the dramatic increase in residential burglary during the 1960s and 1970s. A careful analysis by Lawrence Cohen and Marcus Felson (1979) showed that this increase was due to a combination of temptation and opportunity. Temptation is increased by the rise in the purchase of light-weight electronic goods such as TVs and VCRs in people's homes that could readily be sold. On the other hand, opportunity is increased as a result of more women going out of their homes to work.

The criminologist Van Dijk noticed a typical pattern in the theft of bicycles that also emphasizes the role of opportunity. He observed that the victim of a bike theft would steal a bike from someone else to replace it. That victim would in turn steal a bike from another owner, and so on. Thus, a single bicycle theft would have a multiplier effect, leading to several bicycle thefts. The chain could apply to the theft of any item with these four attributes: widely owned, necessary for daily use, easily taken, and sufficiently expensive.

== Critical developments ==
Since its conception, the opportunity theory has received much analysis, criticism, and reform. Through research and experimentation, the theory has evolved from the contributions and improvements made by different scholars each emphasizing his/her own ideas. Some of these are:

- A criminal act does not, however, result simply and inevitably from the presence of a criminally-disposed individual. The conditions for crime must be right in terms of such situational factors as the availability of a vulnerable target and an appropriate opportunity.
- The lifestyle or routine activities of people alter the opportunity structure of crime, thereby explicitly influencing crime. High victimization rates of certain social classes can be explained by their choice of routine activities. Changes in routine activities in recent years (e.g., away-from-home travel, single-person households, and labor-force participation of both spouses) leave a high percentage of homes unattended during the day and night and place people in relatively unguarded environments.
- A critical development of the crime opportunity theory is that crime itself breeds crime. One way this can happen is when one person victimizes another who then victimizes a third person, and so on. This is called a Van Dijk chain, named after the Dutch criminologist who has studied victimization and helped formulate the crime opportunity theory.

Although the crime opportunity theory is a useful tool for evaluating criminal environments, there are numerous criticisms:

- The protection given to targets by using practical measures like locks and alarms simply displace crime to some other time or place
- No real improvements in levels of crime can be achieved without tackling root psychological and social causes
- If opportunities for certain kinds of crime are blocked, offenders simply resort to more violence or shift their energies to completely different less traceable kinds of crime

== See also ==
- Rational Choice
- Crime Prevention Through Environmental Design (CPTED)
