= Crime pattern theory =

Behavioural theory in criminology

Crime pattern theory is a way of explaining why people commit crimes in certain areas.

Crime is not random, it is either planned or opportunistic.

According to the theory crime happens when the activity space of a victim or target intersects with the activity space of an offender. A person's activity space consists of locations in everyday life, for example home, work, school, shopping areas, entertainment areas etc. These personal locations are also called nodes. The course or route a person takes to and from these nodes are called personal paths. Personal paths connect with various nodes creating a perimeter. This perimeter is a person's awareness space.

Crime pattern theory claims that a crime involving an offender and a victim or target can only occur when the activity spaces of both cross paths. Simply put crime will occur if an area provides the opportunity for crime and it exists within an offender's awareness space. Consequently, an area that provides shopping, recreation and restaurants such as a shopping mall has a higher rate of crime. This is largely due to the high number of potential victims and offenders visiting the area and the various targets in the area. It is highly probable that an area like this will have a lot of car theft because of all the traffic in and out of the area. It is also probable that people may fall victim of purse snatching or pick pocketing because victims typically carry cash with them.

Therefore, crime pattern theory provides analysts with an organized way to explore patterns of behaviour.

Criminals come across new opportunities for crime every day. These opportunities arise as they go to and from personal nodes using personal paths. For example, a victim could enter an offender's awareness space by way of a liquor store parking lot or a new shopping center being built. If the shopping center is being built in an area where crime occurs a couple of miles away, chances are it will exist in some if not all offender's awareness space. This theory aids law enforcement in figuring out why crime exists in certain areas. It also helps predict where certain crimes may occur.

== Rules ==
1. Criminals travel on a day-to-day basis through a sequence of activities. During these activities, they may take decisions. When this sequence is repeated daily the decisions made become invariable. This invariability creates an abstract guiding template. When decisions to commit a crime are made this is called a “crime template.
2. Usually criminals do not function individually, they are always involved in some type of networks such as family or friends. These bonds are variable and often affect the decisions made by others in the same network.
3. If criminals make decisions separate from their network, these decisions and crime templates can be combined. The combination of these decisions helps determine crime patterns.
4. Criminals or their networks commit crimes when there is a 'triggering event'. A triggering event starts a process by which an individual locates a potential target or victim that fits within the crime template.
5. There is a limited range within every individual's daily activities. Typically the range depends upon different nodes of activity such as work, school, home, entertainment, or social gathering areas and along the ordinary pathways between these nodes.
6. Criminals have typical spatio-temporal movement patterns similar to that of a law-abiding person. As a result, the most probable area for a criminal to break the law is not far from their normal activity and awareness space.
7. Possible targets and victims usually have passive or active locations or activity spaces that share boundaries with the activity spaces or awareness space of offenders. The possible targets and victims end up being real targets or victims once the offender's willingness to break the law is set off. It is also necessary for the potential target or victim to fit the offender's crime template.
8. When the prior rules operate within the built urban form. Crime generators are created by high flows of people through and to nodal activity points. Crime attractors are created when targets are located at nodal activity points of individuals who have a greater willingness to commit crimes.

== Key concepts ==
- Awareness space: A personal perimeter created by the paths taken to and from personal nodes.
- Personal pathway: the route that an individual takes to and from typical locations of activity in his or her daily life.
- Node: An exact location of activity that an individual uses regularly, for example home, work or school.
- Activity space: Describes an area of activity where crime can occur.
- Crime generators: A location that attracts a large number of people without any premeditated intention to commit a crime but the opportunity is too good to pass up, for example a shopping mall.
- Crime attractors: A location that attracts offenders because of its known opportunity for crime.
- Edges: The boundaries of an individual's awareness space.
- Critical developments: The West Midlands Police department in the United Kingdom utilized crime pattern theory to figure out where crime was being committed and how far away from home juvenile criminals travelled from home to commit crimes. In two years they analysed 258,074 crime trips. In their study they found that most journeys were less than half a mile. The amount travelled depended on the crime committed. Another interesting fact they found was that females typically travelled farther than males. This research helped the department to find new ways to prevent and control crime.
- Empirical support: A study by Susan Wernicke in City of Overland Park, Kansas found that juveniles that were arrested had committed crimes on average approximately one mile away from home, because they had a small awareness space. These youth had a smaller awareness space than most adults because they have less nodes, the typical juvenile only has three main nodes home, school and entertainment. To add to that they had no transportation which decreases the size of their awareness space as they can access only what is near home. As the juveniles grew older the study showed that the distance between home and the offense increased, because their awareness space grew larger with more nodes such as a part-time job and access to transportation.
- Criticisms: Crime pattern theory being a branch of situational crime prevention, focuses on preventing crime by changing the environment of an offender. This perspective is criticized by social crime prevention for being 'anti-social' because it does little to help individuals prone to committing crime. Social crime prevention seeks to change individuals by different types of community involvement such as rehabilitation programs. Crime pattern theory focuses primarily on individuals and not on groups. Statistically, a large amount of crime is committed in groups. Consequently, crime pattern theory is often criticized for being too focused on individuals instead of groups.
- Crime prevention implications: One way this can be used to help prevent crime would be to find out where suspects live or could possibly live. If a suspect consistently hits certain targets law enforcement can use this theory to try and pinpoint where he or she lives and what the suspect's next move could potentially be.

== See also ==
- Environmental criminology
- Routine activity theory
