= Green criminology =

Branch of criminology involving crimes against the environment

Green criminology is a branch of criminology that involves the study of harms and crimes against the environment broadly conceived, including the study of environmental law and policy, the study of corporate crimes against the environment, and environmental justice from a criminological perspective.

== Origins ==
The term "green criminology" was introduced by Michael J. Lynch in 1990, and expanded upon in Nancy Frank and Michael J. Lynch's 1992 book, Corporate Crime, Corporate Violence, which examined the political economic origins of green crime and injustice, and the scope of environmental law. The term became more widely used following publication of a special issue on green criminology in the journal Theoretical Criminology edited by Piers Beirne and Nigel South in 1998. Green criminology has recently started to feature in university-level curriculum and textbooks in criminology and other disciplinary fields.

The study of green criminology has expanded significantly over time, and is supported by groups such as the International Green Criminology Working Group. There are increasing interfaces and hybrid empirical and theoretical influences between the study of green criminology, which focuses on environmental harms and crimes, and mainstream criminology and criminal justice, with criminologists studying the 'greening' of criminal justice institutions and practices in efforts to become more environmentally sustainable and the involvement of people in prison or on probation in ecological justice initiatives.

== Approaches ==
Though green criminology was originally proposed as a political economic approach for the study of environmental harm, crime, law and justice, there are now several varieties of green criminology as noted below.

=== Political economy, environmental justice, and the treadmill of production approach ===
The initial grounding of green criminology was in political economic theory and analysis. In his original 1990 article, Lynch proposed green criminology as an extension of radical criminology and its focus on political economic theory and analysis. In that view, it was essential to examine the political economic dimensions of green crime and justice in order to understand the major environmental issues of our times and how they connect with the political economy of capitalism. The political economic approach was expanded upon by Lynch and Paul B. Stretesky in two additional articles in The Critical Criminologist. In those articles, Lynch and Stretesky extended the scope of green criminology to apply to the study of environmental justice, and followed that work with a series of studies addressing environmental justice concerns, the distribution of environmental crimes and hazards, and empirical studies of environmental justice movements and enforcement.

Later, working with Michael A. Long and then Kimberly L. Barrett, the political economic explanation and empirical studies of green crimes were adapted to include a perspective on the structural influence of the treadmill of production on the creation of green crimes drawn from the work of Allan Schnaiberg, environmental sociology, eco-socialism and ecological Marxism. Throughout the development of the political economic approach to green criminology, scholars have made significant use of scientific and ecological literatures, as well as empirical analysis, which have become characteristics of this approach and distinguish it from other varieties of green criminology.

=== Nonspeciesist and nonhuman animal studies ===
The second major variation of green criminology is the nonspeciesist argument proposed by Piers Beirne. In Beirne's view, the study of harms against nonhuman animals is an important criminological topic which requires attention and at the same time illustrates the limits of current criminological theorizing about, crime/harm, law and justice with its focus almost exclusively on humans. This approach also includes discussions of animal rights. Beirne's approach to green criminology has been extremely influential, and there are now a significant number of studies within the green criminological literature focusing on nonhuman animal crimes and animal abuse. In addition to studies of animal abuse, included within the scope of nonhuman animal studies are those focused on illegal wildlife trade, poaching, wildlife smuggling, animal trafficking and the international trade in endangered species.

Many of the studies green criminologists undertake in this area of research are theoretical or qualitative. Ron Clarke and several colleagues, however, have explored empirical examinations of illegal animal trade and trafficking, and this has become a useful approach for examining green crimes. Clarke's approach draws on more traditional criminological theory such as rational choice theory and crime opportunity theory, and hence is not within the mainstream of green criminological approaches. Nevertheless, Clarke's approach has drawn attention to important empirical explanations of green crimes.

=== Bio-piracy and eco-crimes ===
Similar to the political economic approach but without grounding in political economic theory, some green criminologists have explored the issue of green crime by examining how corporate behavior impacts green crimes. Among other issues, this approach has included discussions of eco-crimes and activities such as bio-piracy as discussed by Nigel South. Bio-piracy is largely an effort by corporations to commodify native knowledge and to turn native knowledge and practices into for-profit products while depriving native peoples of their rights to that knowledge and those products, and in most cases, avoiding payments to natives for their knowledge or products. Bio-piracy includes issues of social and economic justice for native peoples. These kinds of crimes fall into the category of eco-crimes, a term associated with the work of Reece Walters. Also included within the examination of eco-crimes is the analysis of other ecologically harmful corporate behaviors such as the production of genetically modified foods and various forms of toxic pollution.

=== Ecocide ===
Ecocide describes attempts to criminalize human activities that cause extensive damage to, destruction of or loss of ecosystems of a given territory; and which diminish the health and well-being of species within these ecosystems including humans. It involves transgressions that violate the principles of environmental justice, ecological justice and species justice. When this occurs as a result of human behaviour, advocates argue that a crime has occurred. However, this has not yet been accepted as an international crime by the United Nations.

=== Eco-global criminology ===
Some of those who study environmental crime and justice prefer the use of Rob White's term, eco-global criminology. In proposing this term, White suggested that it is necessary to employ a critical analysis of environmental crime as it occurs in its global context and connections. Similar to Lynch's political economic approach to green criminology, White has also noted that it is desirable to refer to the political economy of environmental crime, and to social and environmental justice issues.

=== Green-cultural criminology ===
As proposed by Avi Brisman and Nigel South green-cultural criminology attempts to integrate green and cultural criminology to explore the cultural meaning and significance of terms such as "environment" and "environmental crime". Green-cultural criminology goes against traditional approaches in regards to criminology, bringing attention to social harms and social consequences.

=== Conservation criminology ===
Conservation criminology is complementary to green criminology. Originally proposed by an interdisciplinary group of scholars from the Department of Fisheries & Wildlife, School of Criminal Justice, and Environmental Science & Policy Program at Michigan State University, conservation criminology seeks to overcome limitations inherent to single-discipline science and provide practical guidance about on-the-ground reforms. Conservation criminology is an interdisciplinary and applied paradigm for understanding programs and policies associated with global conservation risks. By integrating natural resources management, risk and decision science, and criminology, conservation criminology-based approaches ideally result in improved environmental resilience, biodiversity conservation, and secure human livelihoods.

As an interdisciplinary science, conservation criminology synthesizes theories, methods, and techniques from various disciplines to inform research, practice, education, and policy. This approach requires engagement with the differing epistemologies and ontologies of the contributing fields. The framework has been applied to various forms of extralegal exploitation, including wildlife poaching in Namibia and Madagascar, corruption in conservation, e-waste management, and general regulatory noncompliance. By integrating multiple disciplinary perspectives, conservation criminology examines both primary and secondary consequences of environmental risks.

== Green criminological theory ==
It is often noted that green criminology is interdisciplinary and as a result, lacks its own unique theory or any preferred theoretical approach. Moreover, significant portions of the green criminological literature are qualitative and descriptive, and those studies have generally not proposed a unique or unifying theory. Despite this general lack of a singular theory, some of the approaches noted above indicate certain theoretical preferences. For example, as noted, the political economic approach to green criminology develops explanations of green crime, victimization and environmental justice consistent with several existing strains of political economic analysis.

Beirne's approach takes an interdisciplinary view of theory with respect to various animal rights models and arguments. Clarke's rational choice models of animal poaching and trafficking build on the rational choice tradition found within the criminological literature. To date, these different theoretical approaches have not been examined as competing explanations for green crime and justice, a situation that is found with respect to orthodox or traditional criminological theories of street crime.
