= NIC Inc. =

American technology company and digital government service provider

- Company type: FINANCIAL
- Industry: Technology services
- Founded: 1992 as Kansas Information Consortium; 1999 as NIC Inc.
- Founder: Jeff Fraser
- Headquarters: Olathe, Kansas, United States
- Key people: Harry Herington (CEO and Chairman of the Board); Steve Kovzan (CFO); Jayne Friedland Holland (CSO and Associate General Counsel); William Van Asselt (General Counsel); Doug Rogers (SVP Business Development); Brian Anderson (CTO)
- Services: Digital government services; Payment processing
- Revenue: $344.9 million (as of 2018)
- Number of employees: 900+ nationwide (as of 2016)
- Parent: Tyler Technologies
- Website: http://www.egov.com

NIC Inc. (the "NIC" stands for "National Information Consortium") is a digital government service provider for federal, state and local governments in the United States. It was founded in 1992 and is headquartered in Olathe, Kansas. Harry H. Herington is the chief executive officer and chairman. NIC has long-term contracts with over 3,500 state and local government and federal agencies to provide IT software, services, and payment processing.

On May 11, 2000, NIC acquired SDR Technologies, Inc., based in California, and renamed it to "NIC Technologies". On October 13, 2000, NIC acquired Intelligent Decision Technologies, Ltd. ("IDT"), based in Longmont, Colorado.

NIC announced in February 2021 its plan to be acquired by Tyler Technologies. The acquisition was completed in April 2021.

== Background ==
The company has two primary segments including digital government software & services and payment processing solutions. The main service of the digital governmental solutions and services segment is providing out-sourced state eGovernment portals. Additionally, the other segment is engaged in developing payment processing solutions for state, local and federal governments. NIC Federal generates revenue from a contract with Federal Motor Carrier Safety Administration for the development and management of their online Pre-employment Screen Program presence.

== Acquisitions ==
In 2018, NIC acquired Leap Orbit, a prescription drug-monitoring program (PDMP).

In 2019, NIC acquired Complia, a Centennial, Colorado-based technology platform for government regulated cannabis.

== Recognition ==
In 2013, Forbes listed it as one of America's Best Small Companies.

On February 24, 2014, The company's pre-employment screening program (PSP) customer service team was awarded a Bronze Stevie Award for supporting for the U.S. Department of Transportation Federal Motor Carrier Safety Administration (FMCSA).

In 2014 and 2015, NIC was named one of Kansas City's Healthiest Employers.

In 2017, CFO Steve Kovzan was recognized as a CFO of the Year by the Kansas City Business Journal.
