= Kim Rossmo =

Canadian criminologist (born 1955)

- Born: 1955 (age 70–71); Saskatoon, Saskatchewan, Canada
- Education: Simon Fraser University
- Occupation: Criminologist
- Scientific career
- Fields: Criminology

Kim Rossmo (born 1955) is a Canadian criminologist specializing in geographic profiling.

== Career ==
He joined the Vancouver Police Department as a civilian employee in 1978 and became a sworn officer in 1980. In 1987 he received a master's degree in criminology from Simon Fraser University and in 1995 became the first police officer in Canada to obtain a doctorate in criminology. His dissertation research resulted in a new criminal investigative methodology called geographic profiling, based on Rossmo's formula. This technology was integrated into a specialized crime analysis software product called Rigel. The Rigel product is developed by the software company Environmental Criminology Research Inc. (ECRI), which Rossmo co-founded.

In 1995, he was promoted to detective inspector and founded a geographic profiling section within the Vancouver Police Department. In 1998, his analysis of cases of missing sex trade workers determined that a serial killer was at work, a conclusion ultimately vindicated by the arrest and conviction of Robert Pickton in 2002. A retired Vancouver police staff sergeant has claimed that animosity toward Rossmo delayed the arrest of Pickton, leaving him free to carry out additional murders. His analytic results were not accepted at the time and after a dispute with senior members of the department he left in 2001. His unsuccessful lawsuit against the Vancouver Police Board for wrongful dismissal exposed considerable apparent dysfunction within that department.

=== Washington DC and Texas ===
After serving as director of research at the Police Foundation in Washington, D.C., from 2001 to 2003, he moved to Texas State University where he currently holds the Endowed Chair in Criminology and is director of the Center for Geospatial Intelligence and Investigation. Since then, he has applied techniques of geographic profiling to counterterrorism, animal foraging, biological invasions, and epidemiology. He has also researched and published on the subject of criminal investigative failures. He has written three books.
