= Environmental Criminology Research =

Crime-analysis software company

Environmental Criminology Research Inc.
- Industry: Software development
- Headquarters: Vancouver, British Columbia, Canada
- Website: ecricanada.com

Environmental Criminology Research Inc. (ECRI) is a crime analysis software company based in Vancouver, British Columbia, Canada. The company develops tools for police, military and security use. ECRI pioneered the use of geographic profiling software for serial crime analysis.

== Rigel Software ==
ECRI’s Rigel software was first introduced in 1997 and is based on the doctoral dissertation of Dr. Kim Rossmo, who co-founded ECRI. Rossmo’s criminal geographic targeting (CGT) model, which produces a “probability surface” that shows the relative likelihood of the offender’s base of operations, is patented. Users of the Rigel software include the national police agencies of Canada, the United States, and several European nations, as well as many smaller regional and local police forces.

The software utilizes data such as crime locations, suspect information, case details and investigator details to analyze a series of linked crimes and determine the most probable locations of the offender's residence. This allows investigators to prioritize suspects and focus on areas they may have otherwise overlooked. This process has proven successful in helping to solve many crime series around the globe.

=== Notable Uses ===
Rigel was used as a tool during the Beltway sniper attacks case that took place in October 2002 in Washington, D.C., Maryland, and Virginia. Rigel was also directly involved in helping the Irvine Police Department apprehend Raymond Lopez, who is known as the "Chair Burglar". In hundreds of burglaries, Lopez had the same routine of placing a chair or potted plant next to a home's fence for a quick, easy escape. Rigel identified Lopez as a suspect of interest and he was put on surveillance eventually leading to his arrest. For their work on this case the Irvine Police Department won The International Association of Chiefs of Police (IACP) Choicepoint Award for Excellence in Criminal Investigation.

== See also ==
- Crime mapping
- Geographic Profiling
- Offender profiling
- Rossmo's formula, a geographic profiling formula to predict where a serial criminal lives
