= Socrata =

Software company

- Type: Private
- Industry: Data as a Service
- Founded: 2007
- Founder: Kevin Merritt
- Headquarters: Seattle, Washington, United States
- Key people: Kevin Merritt, Safouen Rabah, Matt Miszewski
- Products: Open data, government performance management, government financial insights, data-driven government
- Website: www.socrata.com

Socrata was a business-to-government software company that provided an open data platform used by government agencies and civic developers. The platform enabled governments to publish data and support the creation of data-driven applications and reporting. The company was founded in 2007 and over time broadened its offerings to include performance management, open checkbooks, and data integration tools. In April 2018, Socrata was acquired by Tyler Technologies.

After the acquisition, Socrata’s capabilities were expected to be integrated into Tyler’s suite of government software offerings, giving Tyler customers the option to adopt Socrata’s data publishing tools.

== History ==
Socrata was founded in 2007 in Seattle, Washington, later opening offices in Washington, D.C. and London.

The company was originally known as Blist and was introduced as an online data as a service provider at the DEMO 2008 conference.

In 2009, the company rebranded as Socrata and shifted its focus toward providing services to the public sector. Socrata's technology was subsequently used for municipal open-data portals, including the City of Chicago's Data Portal. The portal allows users to search and download city datasets and create maps and graphs from the data. The portal also provides access to datasets through Socrata's Open Data API.

In 2016, Socrata collaborated with Motorola Solutions on CrimeReports, a crime mapping platform used by law enforcement agencies in the United States.

In 2017, the White House presented the federal budget using Socrata, along with other platforms.

In 2018, Socrata was acquired by Tyler Technologies for $150 Million. Many employees joined Tyler, and the company maintained offices in Seattle and Washington, D.C.

In 2019, Motorola Solutions ended its collaboration with Socrata, discontinuing access to open crime data APIs in the United States.

== Cost ==
In 2015, Governing magazine reported that the City of Los Angeles purchased Socrata software for $319,000 in initial fees and $287,000 in annual fees.

== Open Data Network ==
In July 2014, Socrata launched the Open Data Network, a project designed to encourage collaboration between governments and private organizations by providing access to datasets such as crime, transit, and 311 service requests.

== Fund and FedRAMP ==
In 2008, Socrata raised $6.5 million in venture capital funding from Morgenthaler Ventures and Frazier Technology Ventures.[11] In June 2013, it secured an additional $18 million from OpenView Venture Partners, Morgenthaler Ventures, Frazier Technology Partners, and In-Q-Tel. In November 2014, the company raised $30 million in a Series C round led by Sapphire Ventures, with participation from previous investors.

In 2017, Socrata received Federal Risk and Authorization Management Program (FedRAMP) Moderate authorization from the U.S. General Services Administration.
