= Tyler Technologies =

American technology company

Tyler Technologies, Inc.
- Type: Public
- Traded as: NYSE: TYL; S&P 500 component
- Industry: Software
- Founded: 1966; 60 years ago
- Founder: Joseph F. McKinney
- Headquarters: Plano, Texas, U.S.
- Number of locations: 26
- Area served: U.S. Canada
- Key people: John S. Marr Jr. (executive chairman); H. Lynn Moore Jr. (president & CEO)
- Products: Public sector software
- Services: Business services & supplies
- Revenue: ▲US$2.33 billion (2025)
- Operating income: ▲US$358 million (2025)
- Net income: ▲US$316 million (2025)
- Total assets: ▲US$5.64 billion (2025)
- Total equity: ▲US$3.70 billion (2025)
- Number of employees: 7,800 (2025)
- Website: tylertech.com

Tyler Technologies, Inc. is an American technology company based in Plano, Texas, that provides proprietary software to the U.S. public sector. Tyler Technologies has offices in 17 states and one in Toronto, Ontario, Canada.

== History ==
Tyler Technologies was founded by Joseph F. McKinney in 1966 as Saturn Industries after buying three government companies from Ling-Temco-Vought. In 1968, the company acquired Tyler Pipe, a manufacturer of iron pipes, which eventually became the company's main source of annual revenue. Tyler Pipe was later renamed Tyler Corporation as a result of its success. In 1969, Saturn Industries was listed on the New York Stock Exchange. In 1970, the company changed its name to Tyler Corporation. Tyler Corporation entered the government software market in 1998. Tyler Corporation changed its name to Tyler Technologies in 1999.

=== Acquisitions ===
Acquisitions by Tyler Technologies since 1998
Year acquired	Company name(s) and location
1998	Business Resources Corporation (BRC) in Minneapolis, MN.; Interactive Computer Designs, Inc. (Incode) in Lubbock, TX.; The Software Group, Inc. in Plano, TX.
1999	Eagle Computer Systems, Inc. in Eagle, CO.; Micro Arizala Systems, Inc. (Fundbalance) in Ann Arbor, MI.; Process Incorporated d/b/a Computer Center Software (Munis) in Falmouth, ME.; Gemini Systems (a subsidiary of Essex Technology Group, Inc. in Rochelle Park, NJ).; Cole Layer Trumble Company (CLT) in Dayton, OH.
2003	Eden Systems, Inc. in Renton, WA.; GBF Information Systems in Portland, ME.
2006	MazikUSA, Inc. (Mazik Global, Inc.), in Park Ridge, IL.; TACS, Inc. in Indianapolis, IN.
2007	Advanced Data Systems, Inc. in Bangor, ME.; EDP Enterprises, Inc. in Longview, TX.; Chandler Information Systems in Cameron, TX.
2008	Versatrans in Latham, NY; Olympia Computing Company, Inc. in Olympia, WA
2009	PulseMark, LLC in St. Louis, MO.; Assessment Evaluation Services, Inc. in San Diego, CA.; Parker-Lowe & Associates in Ocracoke, NC.
2010	Wiznet, Inc. in Delray Beach, FL.
2011	Yotta MVS Inc. in Kansas City, MO.; Windsor Management Group (Infinite Visions) in Tempe, AZ.
2012	Akanda Innovation, Inc. in Toronto, Ontario, Canada.; UniFund, LLC in Nashua, NH.; Computer Software Associates, Inc. in Billings, MT.; EnerGov Solutions in Duluth, GA.
2014	SoftCode, Inc. in Marlborough, MA.
2015	Brazos Technology Corporation in College Station, TX.; New World Systems in Troy, MI.
2016	ExecuTime Software, LLC in Tulsa, OK.
2017	Modria Inc. in San Jose, CA.; Radio 10-33 in Plymouth, MN.
2018	Socrata in Seattle, WA.; Sage Data Security, LLC in Portland, ME.; CaseloadPro in Modesto, CA.; MobileEyes of Troy, MI and Atlanta, GA.; SceneDoc in Mississauga, ON.
2019	MicroPact in Herndon, VA.; MyCivic in Seal Beach, CA.
2021	NIC Inc. in Olathe, KS.
2023	ARInspect Inc. in McLean, VA.
2025	MyGov LLC in Norman, OK.; Edulink in Cranberry Township, PA.; CloudGavel in Baton Rouge, LA.
2026	For The Record in Phoenix, AZ.; CODY Systems in Pottstown, PA.

== Products ==
The company's public sector software includes eight categories: appraisal and tax software and services, integrated software for courts and justice agencies, data and insights services, enterprise financial software systems, planning/regulatory/maintenance software, public safety software, records/document management software, and transportation software for schools.

== Controversies ==
In 2014, people in Marion County, Indiana sued claiming they had been wrongfully jailed. In 2016, public defenders in Alameda County, California found dozens of people wrongfully arrested or wrongfully jailed after switching to Tyler’s Odyssey Case Manager software. An October 2021 report from Lubbock County, Texas, cited problems with Tyler Technologies software there as well as in numerous other jurisdictions. In 2021, a $4.9 million federal class action lawsuit was being settled with the county paying $2.45 million and Tyler $816,668. In December 2020, the District Clerk of Wichita Falls, Texas, said they were still experiencing problems they had had since they implemented Tyler Technologies Odyssey Case Manager in July 2019, almost 1.5 years earlier. In December 2021, everythingLubbock.com reported that four months after Lubbock County, Texas, switched their court records to Tyler Technologies software, a trial attorney said, “The rollout of this Tyler system has been an absolute debacle".

In November 2016, Washington County, Pennsylvania, paid Tyler Technologies $1.6 million over their original contract amount of $6.96 million, including paying Tyler Technologies personnel to testify as expert witnesses in county court responding to property owners' complaints.

In 2021, Tyler Technologies paid $3 million to settle a federal class action lawsuit claiming that it had required some employees to work overtime and had not paid them for that time.
