= The Criminologist (newsletter) =

- Type: Newsletter
- Publisher: American Society of Criminology
- Editor: Eric Stewart
- Associate editor: Susan Sharp
- Founded: June 1976
- Website: http://www.asc41.com/criminologist.html

The Criminologist is the official newsletter of the American Society of Criminology. It was founded in 1976 and is published six times per year.
