= Routine activity theory =

Theory in criminology

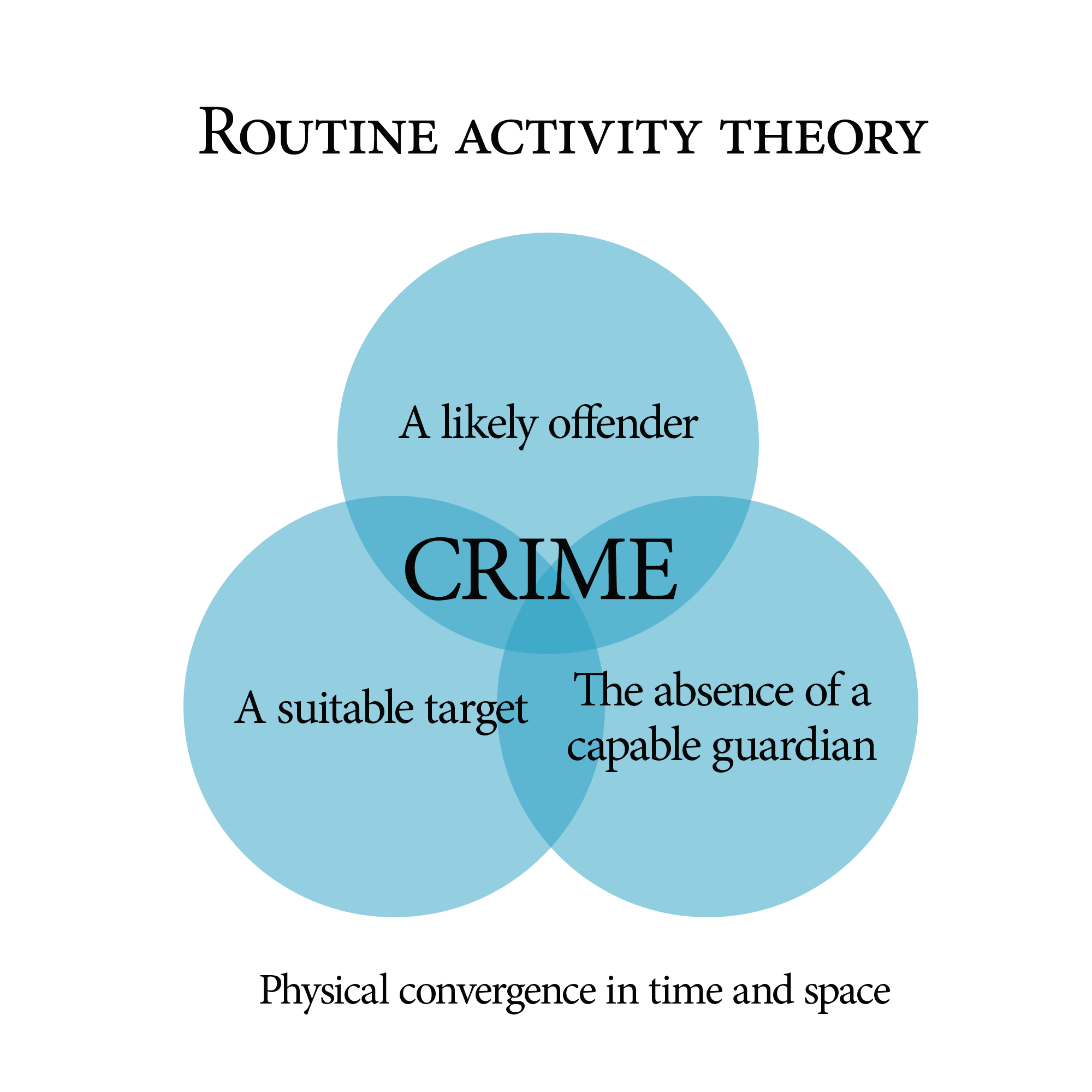
A graphical model of the routine activity theory. The theory stipulates three necessary conditions for most crime; a likely offender, a suitable target, and the absence of a capable guardian, coming together in time and space. The lack of any of the three elements is sufficient to prevent a crime which requires offender-victim contact.

Routine activity theory is a sub-field of crime opportunity theory that focuses on situations of crimes. It was first proposed by Marcus Felson and Lawrence E. Cohen in their explanation of crime rate changes in the United States between 1947 and 1974. The theory has been extensively applied and has become one of the most cited theories in criminology. Unlike criminological theories of criminality, routine activity theory studies crime as an event, closely relates crime to its environment and emphasizes its ecological process, thereby diverting academic attention away from mere offenders.

After World War II, the economy of Western countries started to boom and the Welfare states were expanding. Despite this, crime rose significantly during this time. According to Felson and Cohen, the reason for the increase is that the prosperity of contemporary society offers more opportunities for crime to occur. For example, the use of automobiles, on one hand, enables offenders to move more freely to conduct their violations and, on the other hand, provide more targets for theft. Other social changes such as college enrollment, female labor participation, urbanization, suburbanization, and lifestyles all contribute to the supply of opportunities and, subsequently, the occurrence of crime.

Routine activity theory has its foundation in human ecology and rational choice theory. Over time, the theory has been extensively employed to study sexual crimes, robberies, cyber crimes, residential burglary and corresponding victimizations, among others. It is also worth noting that, in the study of criminal victimization, the routine activity theory is often regarded as "essentially similar" to lifestyle theory of criminology by Hindelang, Gottfredson & Garofalo (1978). More recently, routine activity theory has been empirically evaluated as a mechanism explaining the long-noted association between warmer weather and some types of crime.

== Theoretical framework ==
In routine activity theory, crime is likely to occur when three essential elements of crime converge in space and time: a motivated offender, an attractive target, and the absence of capable guardianship.

The analytic focus of routine activity theory takes a macro-level view and emphasizes broad-scale shifts in the patterns of victim and offender behavior. It focuses on specific crime events and offender behavior/decisions. Routine activity theory is based on the assumption that crime can be committed by anyone who has the opportunity. The theory also imply that victims can increase or decrease their risk of victimization mainly by whether they placing themselves in situations where a crime can be committed against them.

=== Motivated offender ===
Motivated offenders are individuals who are not only capable of committing criminal activity, but are willing to do so. This element that has received the most criticism due to the lack of information regarding what it truly is. A motivated offender can be pointed out as any type of person who has true intent to commit a crime against an individual or property. However, the motivated offender has to be someone who is able to commit the crime, or, in other words, has everything he or she needs to commit a crime, physically, and mentally.

=== Suitable target ===
In Routine Activity Theory, the term 'target' is preferred over the term 'victim', as they might not be present at the scene of the crime. For example, an owner of a television might be away from their home when a burglar decides to target the television for stealing. The television is the target and the owner's absence indicates the absence of a capable guardian, thereby making the crime more likely according to the theory. A suitable target is any type of individual or property that the motivated offender can damage or threaten in the easiest way possible. If a target is suitable, this means that there is a greater chance that the crime can be committed, rather than, a target that is hard to achieve. The acronym VIVA provides four different attributes of what makes a target actually suitable, in the judgement of the offender. The acronym goes as follows:

V: Value (The value of achieving the target, in a real or symbolic manner)
I: Inertia (The physical obstacles of the target: weight, height, strength, etc.)
V: Visibility (The attribute of exposure which solidifies the suitability of the target)
A: Access (The placement of the individual, or object, that increases, or lessens, the potential risk of the intended attack)

=== Absence of a suitable guardian ===
Guardianship refers to a person or an object that is effective in deterring criminal offenses, and sometimes crime is stopped by simple presence of guardianship in space and time. A guardian would not necessarily have to be a policeman or a security guard but rather a person whose proximity or presence would lower the chances of a crime happening. This could include a housewife, a doorman, a neighbor or a co-worker. Whilst inadvertent, the presence of a guardian has a powerful impact on the likelihood of a crime taking place. Thus when the guardian is not within the vicinity of the target, the likelihood of a crime occurring is significantly higher.

== Empirical evidence ==
Criminologist Lynch (1987), using "domain-specific" models, demonstrates that occupation-related activities generally have a stronger impact on the risk of victimization at work than sociodemographic characteristics. The specific attributes of activities pursued at work exposure, guardianship, attractiveness—were all related to victimization in ways predicted by activity theory. These findings identify specific attributes of occupations that could be modified to reduce the risk of criminal victimization at work. Victimization of workers at work will decline if mobility, public accessibility, and handling of money as part of the occupational role are reduced.

In A Routine Activity Theory Explanation for Women's Stalking Victimizations, criminologists Mustaine & Tewksbury (1999) conducted a self-administered study in the third quarter of 1996 to 861 college or university female students from nine postsecondary institutes from eight states of the US. The study reveals that women's victimization risk of stalking can be explained by individual lifestyle behaviors, including employment, location of residence, substance use (drug and alcohol) and self-protection.

Felson & Cohen (1980) establishes that those who live alone are more likely to be out alone and to have little help in guarding their property, they probably face higher rates of victimization for both personal and property crimes. The 30.6% increase in employed and married female's participation rates not only subjects these women to greater risk of attack on their way to and from work, but also leaves their home and car less guarded from illegal entry. The 118% increase in the proportion of the population consisting of female college students places more women at risk of attack when carrying out daily activities as students, since they may be less effectively protected by family or friends.

Pratt, Holtfreter & Reisig (2010) using a sample of 922 adults in Florida show that one's online routine activities, shaped by one's sociodemographic characteristics, strongly shape the person's risk of falling victim of Internet fraud. Their findings clearly shed light on the validity of routine activities theory on crimes that targeted Internet users. Using university computer attack data, Maimon et al. (2013) reveal evidence supporting routine activity theory. They find that the risk of computer attacks increases during university official business hours and that foreign-origin attacks are substantially attributed to the number of foreign network users.

== Criticisms ==
Routine activity theory is mainly a macro theory of crime and victimization. It requires motivated offenders, but does not explain how such offenders become motivated.

== See also ==
- Crime pattern theory
- Environmental criminology
- Human ecology
- Mobility triangles
- Rational choice theory (criminology)
- Social disorganization theory

== Sources ==
- Felson, Marcus; Clarke, Ronald V (1998). Opportunity Makes the Thief: Practical Theory for Crime Prevention (PDF). Home Office, Policing and Reducing Crime Unit, Research, Development and Statistics Directorate. ISBN 978-1-84082-159-8.
