= Rational choice theory (criminology) =

Crime is based on rational choices

Economist Olivier Marie (Erasmus University Rotterdam) about the rational choice theory

Rational choice modeling has a long history in criminology. This method was designed by Cornish and Clarke to assist in thinking about situational crime prevention. In this context, the belief that crime generally reflects rational decision-making by potential criminals is sometimes called the rational choice theory of crime.

The rational choice theory has sprung from older and more experimental collections of hypotheses surrounding what has been essentially, the empirical findings from many scientific investigations into the workings of human nature. The conceiving and semblance of these social models which are hugely applicable to the methodology expressed through the function of microeconomics within society are also similarly placed to demonstrate that a sizable amount of data is collated using behavioural techniques which are tweaked and made adjustable in order to ensure compatibility with the spontaneous motivational drives displayed by the consumer.

== Elements ==
The theory is related to earlier drift theory (David Matza, Delinquency and Drift, 1964) where people use the techniques of neutralization to drift in and out of delinquent behaviour, and systematic crime theory (an aspect of social disorganization theory developed by the Chicago School), where Edwin Sutherland proposed that the failure of families and extended kin groups expands the realm of relationships no longer controlled by the community, and undermines governmental controls. This leads to persistent "systematic" crime and delinquency. He also believed that such disorganization causes and reinforces the cultural traditions and cultural conflicts that support antisocial activity. The systematic quality of the behaviour was a reference to repetitive, patterned or organized offending as opposed to random events. He depicted the law-abiding culture as dominant and more extensive than alternative criminogenic cultural views and capable of overcoming systematic crime if organized for that purpose. In a similar vein, Cohen & Felson (1979) developed the routine activity theory which focuses on the characteristics of crime rather than the characteristics of the offender. This is one of the main theories of environmental criminology as an aspect of crime prevention theory. It states that for a crime to occur, three elements must be present, i.e. there must be:

- an available and suitable target;
- a motivated offender; and
- no authority figure to prevent the crime from happening.

Routine activity theory relates the pattern of offending to the everyday patterns of social interaction. Between 1960 and 1980, women left the home to work which led to social disorganization, i.e. the routine of leaving the home unattended and without an authority figure increased probability of criminal activity. The theory is supplemented by the crime triangle or the problem analysis triangle which is used in the analysis both of a crime problem by reference to the three parameters of victim, location, and offender, and of an intervention strategy by reference to the parameters of target/victim, location and absence of a capable guardian with the latter helping to think more constructively about responses as well as analysis. The theory avoids speculation about the source of the offenders’ motivation, which distinguishes it immediately from most other criminological theories.

=== Support for theory ===
Many features of rational choice perspective make it particularly suitable to serve as a criminological “metatheory” with a broad role in the explanation for a variety of criminological phenomena. Since rational choice can explain many different components; it is broad enough to be applied not only to crime but everyday life circumstances. Studies involve offenders being interviewed on motives, methods and target choices. Research involves burglars (Walsh, 1980; Maguire 1982; Cromwell et al., 1991) bank and commercial robbers (New South Wales Bureau of Crime Statistics and Research, 1987; Nugent et al., 1989) and offenders using violence (Morrison and O’ Donnell, 1996). The rational choice perspective has provided a framework under which to organize such information so that individual studies produce more general benefits.

Rational choice theory insists that crime is calculated and deliberate. All criminals are rational actors who practice conscious decision making, that simultaneously work towards gaining the maximum benefits of their present situation. Another aspect of rational choice theory is the fact that many offenders make decisions based on bounded/limited rationality.

=== Bounded/limited rationality ===
Ideas of limited rationality emphasize the extent to which individuals and groups simplify a decision because of the difficulties of anticipating or considering all alternatives and all information. Bounded rationality relates to two aspects, one part arising from cognitive limitations and the other from extremes in emotional arousal. Sometimes emotional arousal at the moment of a crime can be acute, therefore would be offenders find themselves out of control, and rational considerations are far less salient.

Crime therefore can be influenced by opportunity. Opportunity of a crime can be related to cost benefits, socioeconomic status, risk of detection, dependent on situational context, type of offence and access to external benefits. In addition, opportunities are dependent on the individual’s current surroundings and consequential factors. This theory better explains instrumental crimes rather than expressive crimes. Instrumental crimes involve planning and weighing the risks with a rational mind. An example of an instrumental crime can include: tax evasion, traffic violations, corporate crime, larceny and sexual assault. On the other hand, expressive crime includes crimes involving emotion and lack of rational thinking without being concerned of future consequences. Expressive crimes can include: non pre-meditated murder such as manslaughter, drinking and driving and assault. As a result, punishment is only effective in deterring instrumental crime rather than expressive crime.

In 2000, O’Grady et al. performed a study which examined the illegal sale of tobacco products to underage youth. With the use of a rational mind merchants and clerks weigh out the cost benefits and risk factors which are involved in selling cigarettes to underage youth. Due to the minimal risk of police patrol after 5pm, merchants and clerks felt a diminished sense of risk, therefore allowing them to sell their products illegally to underage youth.

According to O'Grady (2011) the three main critiques of rational choice theory include:

- Assumes that all individuals have the capacity to make rational decisions
- The theory does not explain why the burden of responsibility is excused from young offenders as opposed to adult offenders
- This theory contradicts the Canadian Criminal Justice System. This theory does not support the idea that all individuals are rational actors because of cognitive inability. An example of individuals who lack a rational mind include those who are Not Criminally Responsible on Account Due to Mental Disorder (NCRMD).

== Routine activity theory ==
Routine activity theory says that crime is normal and depends on the opportunities available. If a target is not protected enough, if it is worth the reward, crime will happen. Crime does not need hardened offenders, super-predators, convicted felons or wicked people, just an opportunity.

The basic premise of routine activity theory is that most crimes are petty theft and unreported to the police. Crime is not spectacular or dramatic. It is mundane and happens all the time.

Another premise is that crime is relatively unaffected by social causes such as poverty, inequality, unemployment. For instance, after World War II, the economy of Western countries was booming, and the welfare states were expanding. Crime rose significantly. According to Felson and Cohen, this is because the prosperity of contemporary society offers so much opportunities of crime: there is much more to steal.

Routine activity theory is controversial among sociologists who believe in the social causes of crime. But several types of crime are very well explained by routine activity theory:

- copyright infringement related to peer-to-peer file sharing
- employee theft (internal theft)
- corporate crime

== Situational crime prevention ==
The main creation of the rational choice theory was to aide and give focus to situational crime prevention. Situational crime prevention comprises opportunity-reducing measures that are directed at highly specific forms of crime; involves management, design or manipulation of the immediate environment systematically and permanently; makes crime more difficult and risky or less rewarding and excusable as judged by a wide range of offenders. Rather than simply responding to crime after the fact, recent attention to crime prevention has focused on specific ways in which to modify the physical and social environment.

Changes to the physical environment have included such measures as better streetscape and building design, improved lighting in public spaces, installations of deadlocks and alarms, property marking and identification, and traffic calming and creation of green belts. Attempts have been made to extend the range of surveillance of local neighborhood activities, involving such measures as establishment of neighborhood watch committees, employment of private security guards in residences and businesses, antiracist/antifascist organizations and community watch committees to prevent police harassment.

Directing enhanced citizen participation programs are not crime-centered would include for example sports and recreation programs, needle exchange programs and AIDS counseling, local employment initiatives funded by government grants and campaigns against poverty and unemployment.

== Emotions ==
It is argued that there are three important roles of emotions within a rational choice theory of crime. First the people’s state of emotionality is an important context on which rational conduct rests. Second is the “sneaky thrill” of minor property crime also might operate more generally such that the anticipated emotional consequences of criminal conduct is one of the benefits or utilities (“thrills”) that are weighed in the process of rational decision making. Third as a sizable amount of research can attest, the anticipated emotional costs associated with criminal behavior might serve to effectively reduce the likelihood of such behavior. Emotions are a central part of the psychological process of motivation as they heighten the saliency of certain desires, wants, and outcomes and thus energize people to pursue them. Too little emotional intensity and performance suffers from insufficient physical and mental arousal, while too much emotional intensity causes the person to be so aroused that thinking and physical self-control become disorganized. If an offender gets angry easily it is highly probable they won’t think twice about assaulting someone than an individual who is level headed. Negative emotions can hinder rationality thus leading one to use bounded/limited rationality or make an impulsive move towards a criminal action.
