= Crime analysis =

Crime analysis is a law enforcement function that involves systematic analysis for identifying and analyzing patterns and trends in crime and disorder. Information on patterns can help law enforcement agencies deploy resources in a more effective manner, and assist detectives in identifying and apprehending suspects. Crime analysis also plays a role in devising solutions to crime problems, and formulating crime prevention strategies. Quantitative social science data analysis methods are part of the crime analysis process, though qualitative methods such as examining police report narratives also play a role.

== Functions ==
Crime analysis can occur at various levels, including tactical, operational, and strategic. Crime analysts study crime reports, arrests reports, and police calls for service to identify emerging patterns, series, and trends as quickly as possible. They analyze these phenomena for all relevant factors, sometimes predict or forecast future occurrences, and issue bulletins, reports, and alerts to their agencies. They then work with their police agencies to develop effective strategies and tactics to address crime and disorder. Other duties of crime analysts may include preparing statistics, data queries, or maps on demand; analyzing beat and shift configurations; preparing information for community or court presentations; answering questions from the public and the press; and providing data and information support for a police department's CompStat process.

To see if a crime fits a certain known pattern or a new pattern is often tedious work of crime analysts, detectives or in small departments, police officers or deputies themselves. They must manually sift through piles of paperwork and evidence to predict, anticipate and hopefully prevent crime. The U.S. Department of Justice and the National Institute of Justice recently launched initiatives to support “predictive policing”, which is an empirical, data-driven approach. However this work to detect specific patterns of crime committed by an individual or group (crime series), remains a manual task.

MIT doctoral student Tong Wang, Cambridge (Mass.) Police Department CPD Lieutenant Daniel Wagner, CPD crime analyst Rich Sevieri and Assoc. Prof. of Statistics at MIT Sloan School of Management and the co-author of Learning to Detect Patterns of Crime Cynthia Rudin have designed a machine learning method called “Series Finder” that can assist police in discovering crime series in a fraction of the time. Series Finder grows a pattern of crime, starting from a seed of two or more crimes. The Cambridge Police Department has one of the oldest crime analysis units in the world and their historical data was used to train Series Finder to detect housebreak patterns. The algorithm tries to construct a modus operandi (MO). The M.O. is a set of habits of a criminal and is a type of behavior used to characterize a pattern. The data of the burglaries include means of entry (front door, window, etc.), day of the week, characteristics of the property (apartment, house), and geographic proximity to other break-ins. Using nine known crime series of burglaries, Series Finder recovered most of the crimes within these patterns and also identified nine additional crimes.

Machine learning is a modern tool for predictive policing. If patterns are identified the police can immediately try to stop them. Without such tools it can take weeks and even years of shifting though databases to discover a pattern. One example, Series Finder provides a data-driven approach to predictive policing. It’s the first mathematically principled approach to the automated learning of crime series.

Sociodemographics, along with spatial and temporal information, are all aspects that crime analysts look at to understand what is going on in their jurisdiction. Crime analysis employs data mining, crime mapping, statistics, research methods, desktop publishing, charting, presentation skills, critical thinking, and a solid understanding of criminal behavior. In this sense, a crime analyst serves as a combination of an information systems specialist, a statistician, a researcher, a criminologist, a journalist, and a planner for a local police department.

== Profession ==
Crime analysts are employed at all levels of law enforcement, often as civilian professionals while other agencies appoint sworn police officers to a crime analysis position. In the United States, most crime analysts are employed by municipal or county police departments. In countries other than the United States, crime analysis is often called "intelligence analysis" or "criminal intelligence analysis," but in the U.S., this term is generally understood to apply to a different law enforcement discipline. Many medium and large local law enforcement agencies have dedicated crime analysis units, while many smaller jurisdictions (e.g. townships) may have a police force that consists of just a few police officers who do not specialize in crime analysis or any other specific aspect of law enforcement.

As a profession, crime analysis has existed since at least the 1960s (though some of its most essential functions were probably performed even in ancient times). The earliest known reference is in O.W. Wilson's 1963 edition of Police Administration. At first only present in very large municipal agencies, the profession got a boost in the 1970s under funding supplied by the Law Enforcement Assistance Administration (LEAA). It was during this decade that the first standardized "manuals" of the profession began to appear. After suffering a dearth of funding in the 1980s, the crime analysis scene changed dramatically in the 1990s with the computer revolution, the existence of new funding under the U.S. Department of Justice's COPS Office, the rise of several professional associations and federally funded training programs, and the new emphasis within police departments on community policing and problem-oriented policing.

A common misconception about a crime analyst's job, is that they go out to crime scenes to investigate; that is the job of a criminalist, to collect forensic evidence, or detective who investigates crimes.

== United Kingdom ==
Crime (and criminal intelligence) analysis in the United Kingdom is governed by the National Intelligence Model, an Association of Chief Police Officers (ACPO) code of practice that establishes a common approach to the business. This was rolled out in 2000 by the National Criminal Intelligence Service (NCIS, now part of the National Crime Agency (NCA)) and adopted by ACPO, becoming a requirement for UK police forces, with a number of minimum standards assessed during inspection by Her Majesty's Inspectorate of Constabulary (HMIC).

There are varying roles available in law enforcement within the UK, from police forces to the Serious Organised Crime Agency to Her Majesty's Customs and Revenue (HMCR) to related roles in private companies such as insurance and telecoms providers. There is an increasing role for analysis within what is referred to as 'partners' within the police, including council authorities. This has particularly been the case since the Crime and Disorder Act (CDA) Review and the subsequent Crime and Disorder (Formulation and Implementation of Strategy) Regulations 2007, which included a requirement for the annual provision of a partnership Strategic Assessment, including analysis in relation to problems of crime and disorder and substance misuse.

Analysts support policing through the provision and support of four key 'Intelligence Products', these being the Strategic Assessment, the Tactical Assessment, the Problem Profile and the Subject Profile (formerly referred to as the 'Target Profile') and ten 'analytical tools & techniques'. The key skills of an analyst within UK law enforcement must to be identify patterns and trends, make inferences in relation to these patterns, provide recommendations to support action and provide products and briefings that deliver this information and interpretation clearly and in an appropriate format for the audience.

== Software ==
Software tools have been specifically developed to aid Crime analysis in specific sectors.
