= James Ciccone =

American actor

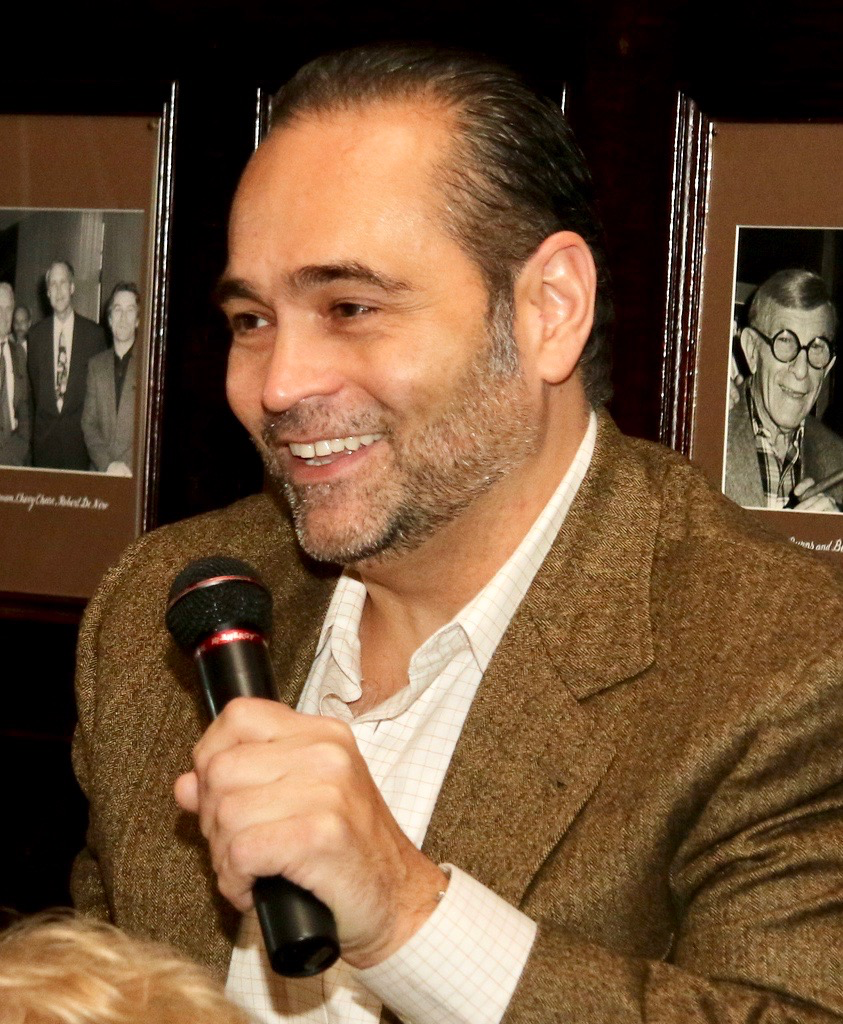
- James Ciccone in 2015
- Born: Park Slope, Brooklyn, New York, U.S.
- Occupation: Actor
- Years active: 2006–present
- Children: 2

James Ciccone is an American actor. He appeared in three seasons as mob boss Carmine Patriccia in the HBO television drama The Deuce. In 2017 Ciccone appeared in the racially charged bio-pic Crown Heights, written and directed by Matt Ruskin, which premiered in competition as a Grand Jury Nomination at the Sundance Film Festival on January 23, 2017, and won the Audience Award for U.S. Dramatic Film. In 2023 he teamed-up with Ruskin again in Boston Strangler (film) starring Keira Knightley. In 2019, he appeared in The Kitchen, starring Melissa McCarthy and Tiffany Haddish, and the Academy Award nominated films Joker, starring Joaquin Phoenix and Robert De Niro, and Martin Scorsese's The Irishman. In late 2021 he can be seen opposite Michael Keaton in Worth, a drama about the September 11th Victim Compensation Fund. He has also appeared in The Marvelous Mrs. Maisel (2022), Law & Order: Organized Crime (2023), American Horror Story (2023).

== Early life ==
Ciccone was born in Park Slope, Brooklyn, as the tenth child to Anthony Ciccone and Theresa (Merrit) Ciccone; he is of Italian and Irish descent. The family owned a local luncheonette until 1965 when Ciccone's father died. After his father's death Ciccone's mother sold the luncheonette and moved the family to the Gravesend/Bensonhurst section of Brooklyn where she worked full-time as a waitress. (Note: As mentioned in the referenced Interview Value of a Tough Upbringing Ciccone was only two years old at the time of his father's death and had no recollection of him.) As a result, Ciccone was raised largely by his nine older siblings, two of whom had artistic influence on him. Early on in elementary school Ciccone participated in several school plays and by age 11 began playing trumpet in the music program at Public School 153, Brooklyn. For the next five years he continued studying music with Academy Award-winning composer Elliot Goldenthal. (Note: According to Ciccone's biography he maintained a close relationship with Goldenthal during his formative years due to their families' relationship (Goldenthal's half-brother was married to Ciccone's aunt; his mother's sister).) In 1977 Ciccone was accepted into the High School of Performing Arts on 46th Street, New York City. The school gained world recognition with the release of the 1980 multiple Academy Award-winning film Fame. (Note: The 46th Street location closed shortly thereafter (1984) and merged with the High School of Music & Art (MA), (formerly located in Harlem) to form the Fiorello H. LaGuardia High School of Music & Art and Performing Arts at a new location across from Lincoln Center.) Ciccone studied music at Performing Arts while studying acting with Uta Hagen at HB Studio. (Note: The HB Studio (Herbert Berghof Studio) is a school offering professional training in the performing arts. Founded in 1945 by Herbert Berghof and located in Greenwich Village, New York City. its curriculum includes classes in a variety of areas, including acting, directing, playwrighting, screenwriting, musical theatre, movement and dance, puppetry, dialect study, and scene analysis. Select classes require an audition for admission. In 1948, Uta Hagen joined the Studio as Berghof's artistic partner, and the two wed ten years later. Her master classes led to the writing of her books Respect for Acting and A Challenge for the Actor.) He later earned a bachelor's degree at Marist College, Poughkeepsie, NY and graduated magna cum laude. In 2000 and 2003 respectively he earned master of divinity and doctor of ministry degrees (Note: Noted in the Doctor of Ministry 40th Anniversary publication Ciccone's DMin dissertation is a prison ministry demonstration project titled Release: An Approach to Freedom for the X-Offender, p30. Said dissertation is available in the New York Theological Seminary library 475 Riverside Drive, New York, NY.) from New York Theological Seminary. Ciccone taught briefly for St. John's University, City University of New York (CUNY), and in the graduate program at Metropolitan College of New York, before beginning a professional acting career. (Note: The Metropolitan College of New York was formerly known as the Audrey Cohen College.)

== Acting career ==
In 2006, Ciccone became a member of the small Primary Talent community theatre group housed at the 200-seat Players Theatre in Manhattan. During this time he appeared in several productions including the lead role in Paddy Chayefsky's Marty. Over the next few years he was cast in a variety of unknown low-budget independent films and several student films at NYU Tish before writing and appearing in his own three short films Nothing for Nothing, Plenty of It, and Neighborhood Nonsense, the latter of which appeared in the 2010 New Filmmakers Film Festival and was featured on Funny or Die. While studying with acting coach Harold Guskin he secured his television debut in an Under-five role as Price, a card-player in the final season of the 54 year running soap, As the World Turns. The following year in 2011 Ciccone landed a multiple day guest star role in an episode of White Collar playing the referee in an underground after-hours boxing club. In 2012 he appeared opposite Donnie Wahlberg and Jennifer Esposito in Blue Bloods and landed a recurring role as Joe Masseria's thug on HBO's Boardwalk Empire. In 2013 he worked opposite Jake McLaughlin and Erik LaRay Harvey in several scenes in an episode of NBC's Believe, directed by Academy Award-winning director Alfonso Cuaron. Ciccone also appeared on network television opposite Debra Messing on The Mysteries of Laura and made guest star appearances as Peter O'Neil on Law & Order: Special Victims Unit. In 2015, Ciccone was cast in the guest star role of Ronald in Master of None where he worked opposite comedian Aziz Ansari (playing Dev) who employs a citizen's arrest only to "weirdly kind of sympathize with [him]". Other 2015 Netflix roles include Cabbie opposite Charlie Cox on Daredevil and Vito in Italian Pinata on Difficult People. Also in 2016 Ciccone appeared in the guest star role of truck-rental mobster Frank Capello on Person of Interest. In late 2016 Ciccone was cast as a guest star (Anthony) in the new CBS episodic Bull starring Michael Weatherly. In the 2017 Sundance Film Festival Ciccone appeared in the World Premiere of the racially charged bio-pic Crown Heights, which took home the Festival Audience Award for the US Dramatic competition. In 2017 Ciccone appeared in recurring roles on two major episodics: NBC's Shades of Blue, and HBO's hit television drama The Deuce starring James Franco and Maggie Gyllenhaal. Also in 2018 Ciccone has made guest star appearances in Fox's primetime network hit, Gotham scene partnering with Robin Lord Taylor, NBC's The Blacklist alongside James Spader, and a co-star appearance on ABC's Quantico where he is paired again with Jake McLaughlin. In 2019, he also starred in Martin Scorsese's The Irishman, opposite Joe Pesci and Robert De Niro.

== Personal life ==
Ciccone has two daughters, born in 2013 and 2021.

== Filmography ==
Year	Title	Role	Notes
2025	The Alto Knights	Carlo Gambino	Supporting
2024	The Equalizer	Leo	Guest star
2024	FBI: Most Wanted	Mike Merullo	Season 5 Episode 12: Derby Day
2023	Boston Strangler	Det. Linski	Supportings
2023	City on Fire	Doorman	Recurring, 6 of 8 eps
2023	American Horror Story	Angelo DeMarco	Guest star
2023	Law & Order: Organized Crime	Tomasso Vinzinni	Guest star
2023	Power Book III: Raising Kanan	Catholic Priest	Guest star
2023	Somewhere in Queens	Louie	Supporting, 2022 release
2022	The Marvelous Mrs. Maisel	Monsignor Ricci	Guest star (season 4)
2021-2024	Saturday Night Live	Older John Higgins / Chef Boyardee / Limo Driver	3 episodes (season 46, 49)
2021	Hit & Run	CPB Officer	Guest star
2020	Worth	James	Supporting
2019	Joker	Trumpets	Supporting, 2019 release
2019	The Irishman	Anastasia Capo	Supporting, 2019 release
2019	The Kitchen	Joe Goon	Supporting, 2019 release
2018	FBI	William Dean	Guest star
2018	Manifest	James Carlucci	Guest star
2018	The Deuce	Carmine Patriccia	Recurring seasons 1, 2 & 3
2018	The Blacklist	Gabinelli	Guest star
2018	Quantico	Dealer	Co-guest star
2017	Shades of Blue	Officer Lewis	Recurring
2017	Bull	Anthony	Guest star
2017	Gotham	Giovanni	Co-guest star
2017	Crown Heights	Desk Officer	Sundance Audience Award 2017
2016	Master of None	Ronald	Guest star
2016	Law & Order: Special Victims Unit	Peter O'Neil	Guest star
2016	Person of Interest	Frank Capello	Guest star
2016	Difficult People	Vito	Co-guest star
2015	Daredevil	Cabbie	Co-guest star
2014	The Mysteries of Laura	Line Guy	Co-guest star
2013	Believe	Craps Dealer	Guest star
2012	Boardwalk Empire	Masseria Thug	Recurring
2012	Blue Bloods	Superintendent	Co-guest star
2011	White Collar	Referee	Guest star
2010	Roommate	Angelo	Supporting
2010	Lipstick Jungle	Bar Patron	Co-guest star
2010	As the World Turns	Price	Recurimg U5
2010	Lotto	Carmine	Supporting
2010	Neighborhood Nonsense	Little Al	Short
2009	Exit 0	Jack	Lead
2009	Plenty of It	Little Al	Short
2009	Rotten Luck	The Boss	Supporting
2008	Shine a Light	Detective Escort	Featured Opp Marty Scorsese
2008	Neighborhood Story	Al	Supporting lead
2008	Samson is the Future	Agent Doyle	Short
2007	Nothing for Nothing	Little Al	Short
