= Max Borenstein =

American screenwriter

Max Borenstein (born June 20, 1981) is an American screenwriter. He is best known as the creator of the MonsterVerse film series featuring classic Kaiju of Toho's Godzilla mythos, including writing Godzilla, Godzilla: Awakening (both 2014) and Kong: Skull Island (2017), and contributing to the story of Godzilla: King of the Monsters (2019) and Godzilla vs. Kong (2021). In 2022, he co-created the sports drama series Winning Time: The Rise of the Lakers Dynasty on HBO.

== Life and career ==
Borenstein wrote, edited, and directed the 2003 film Swordswallowers and Thin Men while a senior at Yale University. Starring Peter Cellini, Zoe Kazan, Fran Kranz and Graham Norris, and featuring Army Wives star Sally Pressman and Midnight's Children lead Satya Bhabha, the film won Best Feature and Best Screenplay at the New York Independent Film Festival and was named Best First Feature 2003 by Los Angeles Times critic Kevin Thomas.

Borenstein's 2008 screenplay What Is Life Worth?, based on Kenneth Feinberg's memoir of the same name, was included on The Black List, an annual list compiled by Hollywood executives of their favorite unproduced screenplays. On February 14, 2018, it was reported that he would produce his screenplay into film alongside Michael Sugar, Marc Butan, Sean Sorensen, and Bard Dorros, with director David Frankel helming the project. It was ultimately directed by Sara Colangelo under the title Worth. His 2009 screenplay Jimi, commissioned by Legendary Pictures and based on the life of guitarist Jimi Hendrix, was also included on The Black List.

Borenstein is the credited creator of Legendary's MonsterVerse, having written and/or co-written the films Godzilla, Kong: Skull Island, and Godzilla: King of the Monsters, as well as the prequel graphic novel Godzilla: Awakening, co-written with his brother Greg, and executive producing the Apple TV+ television series Monarch: Legacy of Monsters, which adapts the character of Lee Shaw from Awakening to live-action.

On January 30, 2013, Borenstein was hired to write Paladin for Walt Disney Pictures, and Mona for New Regency. On May 4, 2017, HBO announced that Borenstein is one of four writers working on a potential pilot for a Game of Thrones spin-off. In addition to Borenstein, Carly Wray, Jane Goldman, and Brian Helgeland are also working on potential pilots. Borenstein has been working and communicating with George R. R. Martin, the author of A Song of Ice and Fire, the series of novels upon which the original series is based. Current Game of Thrones showrunners D. B. Weiss and David Benioff would also be executive producers for whichever project is picked up by HBO.

On January 12, 2025, KTLA reported that Max had lost his home during the 2025 California wildfires.

== Bibliography ==
Year	Title	Note
2014	Godzilla: Awakening	Co-written with Greg Borenstein

== Filmography ==
=== Film ===
Year	Title	Director	Writer	Producer	Notes
2003	Swordswallowers and Thin Men	Yes	Yes	No	Also cinematographer, editor and actor
2014	Godzilla	No	Yes	No	
2017	Kong: Skull Island	No	Yes	No	
2019	Godzilla: King of the Monsters	No	Story	No	
2020	Worth	No	Yes	Yes	
2021	Godzilla vs. Kong	No	Yes	No	
2023	Hypnotic	No	Yes	No	

Executive producer

- Ascension (2008)

=== Television ===
Year	Title	Writer	Executive Producer	Notes
2015	Minority Report	Yes	Yes	Also developer
2019	The Terror: Infamy	Yes	Yes	Also creator
2022–2023	Winning Time: The Rise of the Lakers Dynasty	Yes	Yes	
2023	Monarch: Legacy of Monsters	No	Yes	Co-created Lee Shaw (portrayed by Kurt Russell and Wyatt Russell) with Greg Borenstein for the 2014 graphic novel Godzilla: Awakening.

=== Short film ===
Year	Title	Director	Writer	Producer
2007	Law and Order: Christmas Special	Yes	No	No
2008	A Room of One's Clone	Yes	No	No
2015	In Her Place	No	Yes	Yes
