= Crown Heights (film) =

2017 film by Matt Ruskin

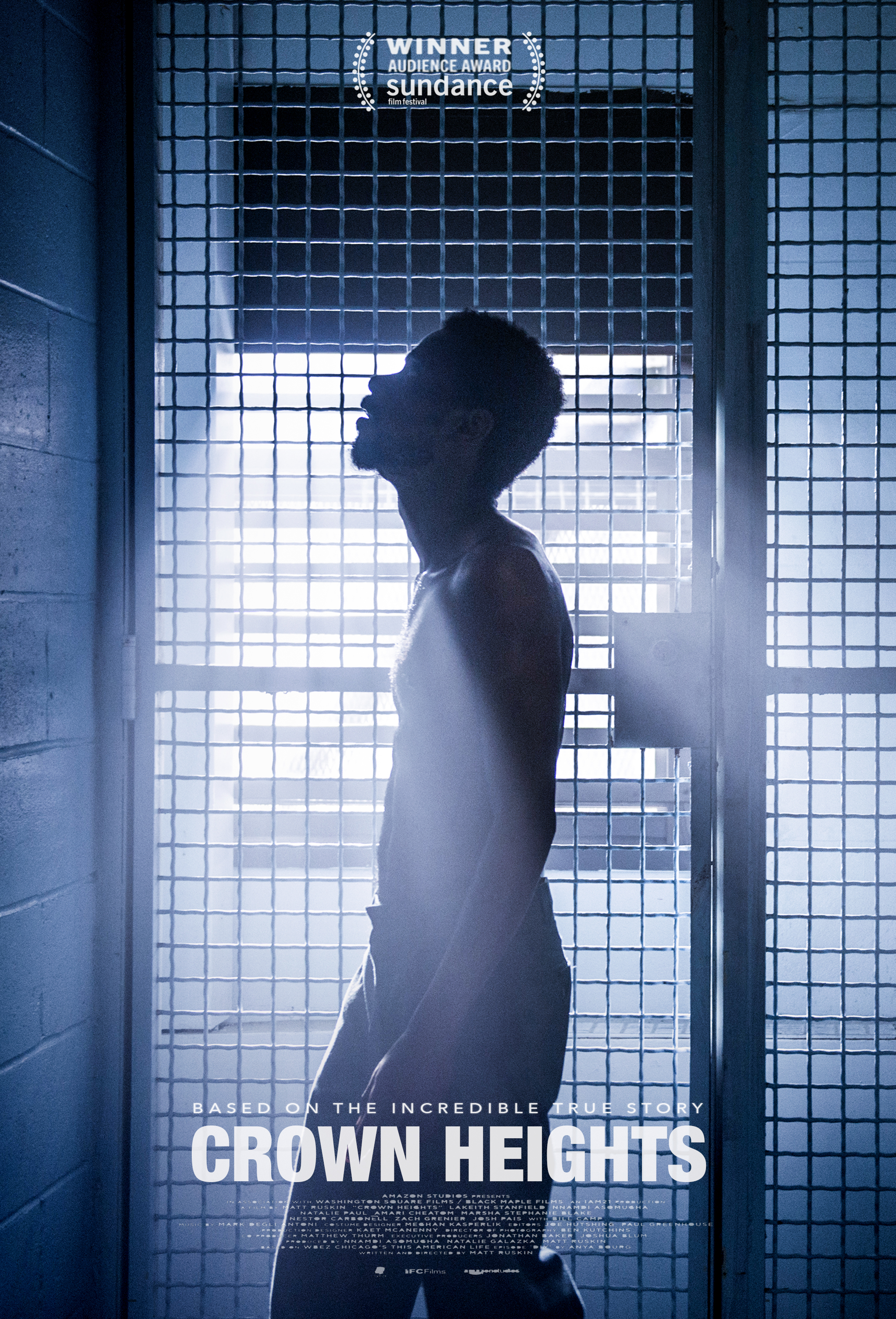
- Promotional poster
- Directed by: Matt Ruskin
- Written by: Matt Ruskin
- Based on: This American Life: Colin Warner
- Produced by: Natalie Galazka; Matt Ruskin; Nnamdi Asomugha
- Starring: Lakeith Stanfield; Nnamdi Asomugha; Natalie Paul; Marsha Stephanie Blake; Nestor Carbonell; Gbenga Akinnagbe; Sarah Goldberg; Josh Pais; Ron Canada; Zach Grenier
- Cinematography: Ben Kutchins
- Edited by: Paul Greenhouse
- Music by: Mark De Gli Antoni
- Production companies: Black Maple Films; Washington Square Films; Iam21 Entertainment
- Distributed by: Amazon Studios; IFC Films
- Release dates: January 23, 2017 (Sundance); August 18, 2017 (United States)
- Running time: 94 minutes
- Country: United States
- Language: English
- Box office: $238,558

Crown Heights is a 2017 American biographical crime drama film written and directed by Matt Ruskin. Adapted from This American Life podcast, the film tells the true story of Colin Warner who was wrongfully convicted of murder, and how his best friend Carl King devoted his life to proving Colin's innocence. The film stars Lakeith Stanfield as Colin Warner and Nnamdi Asomugha as Carl King.

It premiered in competition at the Sundance Film Festival on January 23, 2017 and won the Audience Award for U.S. Dramatic Film. The film was released on August 18, 2017, by Amazon Studios and IFC Films.

== Cast ==
- Lakeith Stanfield as Colin Warner
- Nnamdi Asomugha as Carl King, Colin’s best friend
- Nestor Carbonell as Bruce Regenstreich
- Gbenga Akinnagbe as Sampson
- Sarah Goldberg as Shirley Robedee
- Josh Pais as District Attorney Maffeo
- Ron Canada as Judge Marcy
- Zach Grenier as Detective Cassel
- Yul Vazquez as Commissioner Rafello
- Nyree Binns as Sasha
- Adriane Lenox as Grace
- Natalie Paul as Antoinette
- Skylan Brooks as Thomas
- Armand Schultz as Bob Logan
- Amari Cheatom as Leon Grant
- Cherelle Cargill as Diane Cardwell
- Cory Saint-Laurent as Marvin Grant
- Bill Camp as William Robedee
- Luke Forbes as Anthony Gibson
- Ras Enoch McCurdie as Hassan Wilton
- James Ciccone as Desk Officer
- Brian Tyree Henry as Massup
- James Udom as Mechanic

== Production ==
On August 6, 2015, it was announced that Matt Ruskin would direct a biographical film about wrongfully convicted prisoner Colin Warner based on his own script, which Lila Yacoub would produce along with Black Maple Films and iAm21 Entertainment. Lakeith Stanfield was added to the cast to play Warner who spent 20 years in prison for a crime he did not commit in 1980, when he was just 18 years old. Nnamdi Asomugha would also star as Carl King, Warner's lifelong friend who fought to prove Warner's innocence. On September 15, 2015, newcomer Natalie Paul was cast in the film.

Principal photography on the film began on September 9, 2015 in New York City.

== Release ==
Crown Heights premiered in competition in the US Dramatic Category at the Sundance Film Festival on January 23, 2017. Amazon Studios acquired distribution rights to the film. IFC Films co-distributed the film alongside Amazon on August 18, 2017. The film received generally favorable reviews out of the Sundance Film Festival, winning the Audience Award for U.S. Dramatic Film.

== Critical reception ==
On Rotten Tomatoes, Crown Heights has an approval rating of 79% based on 84 reviews, with an average rating of 6.6/10. The site’s critics consensus states, "Crown Heights' heartbreaking fact-based narrative -- and LaKeith Stanfield's remarkable starring performance -- push this powerful drama past its structural flaws." Metacritic, which uses a weighted average, assigned the film a score of 64 out of 100, based on 25 critics, indicating "generally favorable" reviews.

== Awards and recognition ==
- Independent Spirit Award for Best Supporting Male - Nnamdi Asomugha (nominee)
