= Colangelo =

Colangelo is an Italian surname. Notable people with the surname include:

- Bryan Colangelo (born 1965), American basketball executive
- Fabio Colangelo (born 1981), retired Italian tennis player
- Jerry Colangelo (born 1939), American businessman and sports mogul, father of Bryan
- Mike Colangelo (born 1976), American baseball player
- Sam Colangelo (born 2001), American ice hockey player
- Sara Colangelo, American film director and screenwriter
- Matthew Colangelo, United States Associate Attorney General in 2021 and a prosecutor in the office of the New York County District Attorney since 2022
- Lidya Colangelo, Italian mayor, mayor of San Severo, Apulia
