= Minority Report (TV series) =

2015 American science-fiction crime drama television series

- Genre: Science fiction; Crime drama
- Based on: "The Minority Report" by Philip K. Dick; Minority Report by Scott Frank; Jon Cohen
- Developed by: Max Borenstein
- Starring: Stark Sands; Meagan Good; Nick Zano; Daniel London; Laura Regan; Li Jun Li; Wilmer Valderrama
- Composer: Sean Callery
- Country of origin: United States
- Original language: English
- No. of seasons: 1
- No. of episodes: 10

Production
- Executive producers: Mark Mylod; Max Borenstein; Darryl Frank; Justin Falvey; Kevin Falls; Steven Spielberg
- Producer: Neal Ahern
- Cinematography: David Franco
- Editors: Julie Monroe; Jon Kosolwsky
- Camera setup: Single-camera
- Running time: 42–46 minutes
- Production companies: Amblin Television; Paramount Television; 20th Century Fox Television

Original release
- Network: Fox
- Release: September 21 – November 30, 2015

Related
- Minority Report (film)

Minority Report is an American science fiction crime drama television series that aired on Fox from September 21 to November 30, 2015. It was developed by Max Borenstein and is a sequel adaptation of the 2002 film of the same name based on the 1956 science fiction short story "The Minority Report" by Philip K. Dick. It was produced by Amblin Television, Paramount Television (whose film studio owns the film via the pre-2005 DreamWorks library), and 20th Century Fox Television (whose film studio co-produced the film). It is the first Steven Spielberg–directed film to be adapted for television. On October 9, 2015, Fox announced that the series order was cut from 13 episodes to 10. Fox cancelled the series on May 13, 2016.

== Synopsis ==
In 2065 Washington, D.C., Dash (Sands), a "precog" has the ability to predict crimes. The precrime unit was dismantled in 2054, forcing law enforcement to rely on newer methods to fight crime. Before it was dismantled, Dash, his twin brother Arthur (Zano), and their foster sister Agatha (Regan) were part of the program that gave them their unique gifts. Now, Dash is using his ability to assist Detective Lara Vega (Good) in preventing crimes, and at the same time trying to keep his gift from being revealed, as there are those who want to obtain the precogs at any cost, and use their abilities once more.

== Cast ==
=== Main ===
- Stark Sands as Dash Parker (né Arkadin), a precog who can see the murders of others before they occur, who seeks ways to stop these preventable deaths. During his precognitive visions Dash sees the fractions of the murders, the horror, as described by Wally with the victim and the murder.
- Meagan Good as Lara Vega, a detective for the Metropolitan Police Department of the District of Columbia who Dash co-ops into assisting him on his mission to save would-be murder victims before their killers can kill them.
- Nick Zano as Arthur Watson (né Arkadin), Dash's fraternal twin brother; an executor, estate planner and finance manager. He reluctantly helps out Dash and Vega. While easier to endure than his brother's or Agatha's visions, Arthur's precognitive visions act more as an antenna, pulling in names, facts, and information about the murdered person.
- Daniel London as Norbert "Wally" Wallace, Dash, Arthur and Agatha's primary caretaker during their eight years in the milk bath. Bonded with the three, Wally joins forces with Dash and Lara and helps "map" Dash's visions for better analyzing of the murders. London reprises his role from the movie.
- Laura Regan as Agatha Lively, a precog who acts as an older sister, protector, and sounding board for Arthur and Dash. Agatha's visions allow her to "become the person" whose murder she is predicting. Experiencing an empathic bond with the person in her visions, Agatha's visions are the most traumatizing as she experiences the death itself.
- Li Jun Li as Akeela, a crime scene tech at Metro Police Department and Lara's best friend, she later joins Lara and Dash on their mission as their tech and information support.
- Wilmer Valderrama as Will Blake, a by-the-books, professional, ambitious, and competitive police lieutenant. Previously Lara's partner, he is now her boss.

=== Recurring ===
- Tina Lifford as Lilly Vega, Lara's mother
- Zhane Hall as Rico Vega, Lara's much younger brother
- Jennifer Cheon as Andromeda, Arthur's business partner and bodyguard
- Reed Diamond as Henry Blomfeld
- Christopher Heyerdahl as Lionel Gray

== Production ==
On September 9, 2014, it was announced that Fox had ordered a pilot for a follow-up television series to the movie. Max Borenstein wrote the script and served as executive producer alongside Steven Spielberg, Justin Falvey and Darryl Frank. Set 11 years after the movie, the series focuses on a male Precog who teams up with a female detective to find a purpose to his gift.

On February 13, 2015, Daniel London and Li Jun Li joined the cast. On February 24, 2015, Laura Regan was cast as Agatha Lively. In March 2015, Stark Sands and Meagan Good landed the lead roles with Sands playing Dash, one of the two male Precogs, and Good playing Lara Vega, a detective haunted by her past who will work with Dash to help him find a purpose for his gift. Li Jun Li plays Akeela, a crime scene technician; Daniel London reprises his role as Wally the Caretaker from the original 2002 film; and Wilmer Valderrama plays a police detective. The show was picked up to series by Fox on May 8, 2015. On July 1, 2015, it was reported that Nick Zano was cast to play Arthur, Dash's fraternal twin brother. Originally, Sands was going to play dual roles of both brothers (as identical twins).

On October 9, 2015, Fox cut the series order from 13 episodes to 10.

== Episodes ==
No.	Title	Directed by	Written by	Original release date	Prod. code	US viewers (millions)
1	"Pilot"	Mark Mylod	Max Borenstein	September 21, 2015	1AYE01	3.10
The Precrime program was abolished and the three precogs, Agatha and her twin brothers Dash and Arthur, were sent to an island. Their records were erased and they had to promise not to intervene in the future. In 2065 in Washington, D.C., Dash is haunted by visions of murders. However, without his twin brother, he is lacking numbers and names he would need to prevent them, so he contacts Detective Lara Vega. A nurse at Open Vista, a rehab institution for former Precrime convicts suffering from a brain disorder caused by the halo containment system, is murdered by one of her patients, who then commits suicide to avoid arrest. Agatha tries to persuade Dash to return home. Dash foresees the murder of Peter Van Eyck's wife. He was the deputy chief of Precrime and is now campaigning, advocating the Hawk-Eye program for data-driven predictive policing. Dash meets with Wally, their former caretaker, and finally with Arthur who gives the missing location of another Open Vista patient who is seeking revenge for having lost his wife due to Precrime. Arthur and Agatha discuss to keep an eye on Vega because Agatha has a vision of the three of them being taken, while Dash is unable to see his own future.
2	"Mr. Nice Guy"	Greg Beeman	Max Borenstein	September 28, 2015	1AYE02	2.56
Dash sees the murder of a girl but can't envision the faces of the victim and murderer. They find the bar name Alpha on the victim's wrist and a tattoo on the murderer's arm from Dash's vision. Lara is questioned regarding the previous murder case of Eyck's wife. Dash goes to Arthur for the names, who, in return, asks Dash for a copy of a case file from Metro PD. Lara and Dash go to the club to watch over the victim and find out the murderer is Tyson Cole, a famous writer with a doctorate from Harvard. Lara tries to talk to Tyson, but he thinks she is trying to manipulate him for the media. Unable to get anything from Cole, Lara searches for the file that Arthur asked for earlier and learns that the case file is about a mother who died giving birth to twins. They then learn from Arthur that the victim's name is "Blanca Garcia". At the bar, Vega meets Blake who lies and says she's on a blind date. Blanca and Tyson grab a taxi together while Dash and Vega follow them. After realizing that Tyson is innocent, they look through Dash's vision and discover that the bartender from the club is the murderer. He has had a crush on Blanca, but she continually ignores him. Dash foresees the fight and helps Vega arrest the bartender. Later, Agatha has a vision of Vega visiting the precogs while they are, once again, hived together.
3	"Hawk-Eye"	Allan Arkush	Kevin Falls	October 5, 2015	1AYE03	2.07
A new police program called Hawk-Eye is put into place to predict criminals based on their activities. Vega enlists Akeela for help to get Dash into Hawk-Eye as an analyst as a cover so he can have freer access to police information.
4	"Fredi"	Olatunde Osunsanmi	Anna Fricke	October 12, 2015	1AYE04	2.05
Dash goes undercover to figure out how to prevent the murder in his most recent vision, and develops feelings for one of the subjects in the vision, but everything isn't what it seems.
5	"The Present"	David Straiton	Shalisha Francis	October 19, 2015	1AYE05	1.82
Dash realizes that Vega is the victim in his latest vision, and the team must solve her father's murder to prevent hers.
6	"Fiddler's Neck"	Nick Hurran	Matt McGuinness	October 26, 2015	1AYE07	1.92
Dash, Vega, and Arthur go to the island the precogs went to after they were released from the Pre-Crime Division in order to prevent the death of a young girl. Agatha must confront the sins of her past, as well as Vega.
7	"Honor Among Thieves"	Sarah Pia Anderson	Sean Hennen	November 2, 2015	1AYE06	1.75
When following up on a murder that couldn't be prevented, Dash gets kidnapped. Vega and Arthur team up to attempt to rescue Dash. Flashbacks of the first couple of months after the precogs are released from the Pre-Crime Division.
8	"The American Dream"	Adam Kane	Lana Cho	November 16, 2015	1AYE08	1.74
Blake is suspicious about Vega and Dash and follows them. In his latest vision, Dash sees the torch from the Statue of Liberty and an octopus. Blake realizes Dash is a precog.
9	"Memento Mori"	Olatunde Osunsanmi	Max Borenstein & Greg Borenstein	November 23, 2015	1AYE09	1.52
A new milk bath and Blomfeld's motivation are revealed. The team pursues a geneticist.
10	"Everybody Runs"	Greg Beeman	Max Borenstein & Kevin Falls	November 30, 2015	1AYE10	2.21
Director Blomfeld has found the precogs. They end up in the milk bath, as Agatha predicted, and buyers are on their way. Wally wants them to run.

== Broadcast ==
In Canada, the series was simulcast with the American broadcast, airing on Global, and the Canadian premiere had 637,000 viewers. In Australia, the series was broadcast in 2016 on One, part of the Ten network.

== Reception ==
=== Critical response ===
The review aggregator website Rotten Tomatoes reports a 29% approval rating and an average rating of 5.4/10 based on 58 reviews. The website's consensus reads, "Lacking either the action or the imagination of its big-screen predecessor, Minority Report is a pedestrian spinoff that fails to capture the vision of the film." On Metacritic, the series has a score of 51 out of 100 based on 31 reviews, indicating "mixed or average reviews".

=== Ratings ===
No.	Title	Air date	Rating/share (18–49)	Viewers (millions)	DVR (18–49)	DVR viewers (millions)	Total (18–49)	Total viewers (millions)
1	"Pilot"	September 21, 2015	1.1/3	3.10	0.9	2.39	2.0	5.49
2	"Mr. Nice Guy"	September 28, 2015	0.9/3	2.56	0.6	1.64	1.5	4.20
3	"Hawk-Eye"	October 5, 2015	0.7/2	2.07	0.5	1.41	1.2	3.48
4	"Fredi"	October 12, 2015	0.7/2	2.05	0.5	1.11	1.2	3.16
5	"The Present"	October 19, 2015	0.6/2	1.82	—N/a	0.93	—N/a	2.75
6	"Fiddler's Neck"	October 26, 2015	0.6/2	1.92	0.4	1.00	1.0	2.92
7	"Honor Among Thieves"	November 2, 2015	0.6/2	1.75	0.4	0.96	1.0	2.71
8	"The American Dream"	November 16, 2015	0.7/2	1.74	—N/a	1.00	—N/a	2.74
9	"Memento Mori"	November 23, 2015	0.5/2	1.52	0.3	0.87	0.8	2.39
10	"Everybody Runs"	November 30, 2015	0.7/2	2.21	TBA	TBA	TBA	TBA

== See also ==
- 2015 in science fiction
- List of adaptations of works by Philip K. Dick
