= Sara Colangelo =

American writer and film director

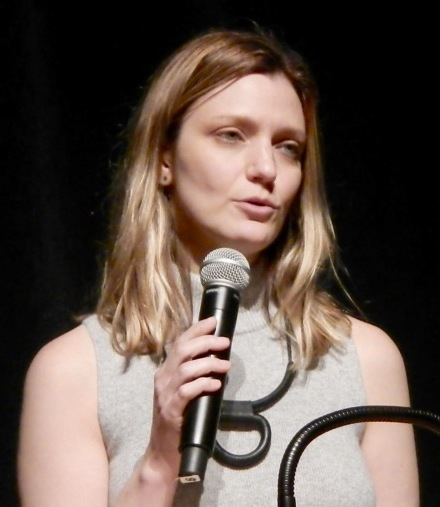
- Colangelo in 2018
- Education: Phillips Exeter Academy
- Alma mater: Brown University; Tisch School of the Arts
- Occupations: Film director; screenwriter
- Spouse: Chris Trujillo (m. 2018)

Sara Colangelo is an American film director and screenwriter known for her films Little Accidents and Worth. Filmmaker Magazine named her one of its "25 New Faces of Independent Film" in 2010.

Colangelo graduated from Phillips Exeter Academy in 1997 and Brown University with a Bachelor of Arts in History in 2001. She received her MFA at New York University's Tisch School of the Arts.

Her NYU thesis project, a short film called Little Accidents, premiered at the 2010 Sundance Film Festival. It won the Grand Jury Prizes for Narrative Short from the Seattle International Film Festival. A full length somewhat different version of the film premiered at the Sundance Film Festival in 2014 and received an Independent Spirit Award nomination for Best First Screenplay. Colangelo was invited to Sundance Labs' Writing Lab and later to their Directing Lab.

Colangelo's remake of an Israeli film, The Kindergarten Teacher, won a directing award in Sundance's dramatic film category and was picked up by Netflix in 2018.

Her film Worth, written by Max Borenstein, was called "a provocative moral thriller" and explored the nuances of determining the value of a lost life for the 911 victims fund.

== Personal life ==
Colangelo grew up in Leominster, Massachusetts. She married Chris Trujillo on November 5, 2016. The couple live in Brooklyn.

== Filmography ==
Feature films

- Little Accidents (2014)
- The Kindergarten Teacher (2018)
- Worth (2020)

Short films

- Halal Vivero (2006)
- Un attimo di respiro (2007)
- Little Accidents (2010)
