= The Kitchen (2019 film) =

Film by Andrea Berloff

- Theatrical release poster
- Directed by: Andrea Berloff
- Written by: Andrea Berloff
- Based on: The Kitchen by: Ollie Masters; Ming Doyle
- Produced by: Michael De Luca; Marcus Viscidi
- Starring: Melissa McCarthy; Tiffany Haddish; Elisabeth Moss; Domhnall Gleeson; James Badge Dale; Brian d'Arcy James; Margo Martindale; Common; Bill Camp
- Cinematography: Maryse Alberti
- Edited by: Christopher Tellefsen
- Music by: Bryce Dessner
- Production companies: New Line Cinema; Bron Creative; DC Vertigo; Michael De Luca Productions
- Distributed by: Warner Bros. Pictures
- Release date: August 9, 2019
- Running time: 102 minutes
- Country: United States
- Language: English
- Budget: $38 million
- Box office: $16 million

The Kitchen is a 2019 American crime film written and directed by Andrea Berloff in her directorial debut. It is based on the DC/Vertigo Comics limited series of the same name by Ollie Masters and Ming Doyle.

The film stars Melissa McCarthy, Tiffany Haddish, and Elisabeth Moss as the wives of Irish American mobsters who take over organized crime operations in New York's Hell's Kitchen in the late 1970s, after the FBI arrests their husbands. The film also features Domhnall Gleeson, James Badge Dale, Brian d'Arcy James, Jeremy Bobb, Margo Martindale, Common, and Bill Camp in supporting roles.

Produced by New Line Cinema, Bron Creative, and Michael De Luca Productions, the film was theatrically released in the United States on August 9, 2019, by Warner Bros. Pictures. It received mostly negative reviews from critics who criticized the convoluted plot, but praising McCarthy, Moss and Haddish's performances and grossed $16 million against its $38 million budget, making the film a box-office bomb.

== Plot ==
One night, in Hell's Kitchen in 1978, three members of the O'Carroll crime family are arrested in an FBI sting operation and sentenced to three years in prison. Jack "Little Jackie" Quinn assumes Kevin's role in the family and assures the wives that they'll be cared for, but provides them barely enough to live on. Kathy is married to Jimmy, a kind man who is increasingly disillusioned with the mob; Ruby is married to Kevin, the son of boss Helen O'Carroll; and Claire is married to Rob, who frequently beats and abuses her.

The women discover businesses paying protection money are upset that Little Jackie isn't actually protecting them. The wives persuade the owners to pay them instead. By providing other favors for their neighbors, the wives earn a profit and the respect of the community. Jackie confronts the women but is killed by Gabriel O’Malley, an enforcer secretly in love with Claire, after assaulting her. With Jackie dead and Gabriel's support secured, the women effectively take control of the family. Gabriel and Claire subsequently begin a relationship.

The women persuade the local Jewish community to hire only Irish-American Union workers for construction jobs. Alfonso Coretti, the head of Brooklyn's Italian Mafia, is unhappy with Irish Americans encroaching on his territory and insists they deal with him. He reveals their husbands will be released in four months and says he'll support the wives and split control of the city, in return for Italian-Americans getting the construction jobs. The women agree.

The husbands are released four months later. Kevin is determined to reassert his power as Helen's heir in the wake of Helen's murder by Ruby. Jimmy pressures Kathy to give up her criminal work. Rob unhappily learns Claire has left him for Gabriel, and when he assaults her, she kills him in self-defence.

Coretti warns the women that family members led by Kevin have placed hits on all three to avenge the deaths of Helen and Rob. Ruby pays the Coretti family to kill her husband and his friends. Kathy removes Colin from the list, and demands the Coretti family not hurt Jimmy. Kevin and the implicated family members are killed and Colin kills Claire before being shot by Gabriel.

After Claire's funeral, Kathy realizes that Ruby has been secretly keeping an FBI agent on the family's payroll. Ruby explains that she set up their husbands to be arrested, as Kevin had refused to let her have a role in the family. Kathy finds that Jimmy is trying to make a deal with the Coretti family to deal with him and cut Kathy out. He takes his children as protection against the Corettis. He tells Kathy that she "didn't have a place" in the world for him, and her mobster career was "humiliating" to him.

Losing trust in Jimmy for "put[ting] [his] ego before [their] children's safety", Kathy tells Alfonso Coretti she relinquishes protection over her husband, and the Corettis whack Jimmy. At Jimmy's funeral, Kathy tells her father that she entered the crime business not for the sake of her children but to attain autonomy.

Ruby and Kathy meet to discuss next steps. Kathy arrives to find Ruby and Gabriel waiting to kill her, leaving Ruby the sole boss. Kathy, anticipating this, has reconciled with the O'Carroll family and brought backup. Gabriel admits that with Claire dead, he no longer has any ties to the mob and deserts Ruby. Kathy tells Ruby that they will now share the responsibility of leading the family. The film ends with Kathy and Ruby making plans to expand their territory to Uptown.

== Cast ==
- Melissa McCarthy as Kathy Brennan, Jimmy's wife, devoted mother of Peter and Jennifer. Initially reluctant to enter the criminal domain, she excels through her deft abilities.
- Tiffany Haddish as Ruby O'Carroll, Kevin's wife and an outsider in the Irish community who seeks self-sufficiency once her husband is not around to protect her.
- Elisabeth Moss as Claire Walsh, Rob's wife, an initially timid woman who falls in love with the violence of her new life. After years of abuse by Rob, she falls for the loving Gabriel.
- Domhnall Gleeson as Gabriel O'Malley, an intense and mentally unstable Vietnam veteran who worked for the Irish mob as a hitman before skipping town to avoid the police. He later returns to help Claire when the wives take over.
- James Badge Dale as Kevin O'Carroll, Ruby's husband and Helen's son. He loves his wife but is unwilling to involve her in his family's business.
- Brian d'Arcy James as Jimmy Brennan, Kathy's husband, who wishes to leave the mob against her wishes.
- Margo Martindale as Helen O'Carroll, Kevin's mother who runs the Irish mob behind the scenes.
- Common as Gary Silvers, an FBI agent on the payroll of the O'Carroll family.
- Bill Camp as Alfonso Coretti, boss of a Brooklyn Italian crime family.
- Jeremy Bobb as Rob Walsh, Claire's abusive, controlling husband and a member of the O'Carroll family.
- E.J. Bonilla as Gonzalo Martinez, Gary's FBI partner.
- Wayne Duvall as Larry, Kathy's father.
- Annabella Sciorra as Maria Coretti, Alfonso's wife.
- Myk Watford as Jack "Little Jackie" Quinn, an Irish mobster who takes over the family after Kevin's arrest.

== Production ==
In February 2017, Andrea Berloff signed on to direct an adaptation of The Kitchen, a Vertigo comic book miniseries by Ollie Masters and Ming Doyle. Berloff had already been commissioned to write the screenplay for the film, but she impressed executives at New Line Cinema, the film's production company, with her "edgy and subversive" perspective. The film is her directorial debut.

In November 2017, Tiffany Haddish, off of a breakthrough performance in Girls Trip, signed on as one of the film's three female leads. In February 2018, Melissa McCarthy came on board for another lead role, and in March 2018, Elisabeth Moss was cast as the last of the three leads, while Margo Martindale, Bill Camp, and Brian d'Arcy James were also added. In April 2018, Domhnall Gleeson, Common, James Badge Dale, Jeremy Bobb, and Alicia Coppola joined the cast, and in May 2018, James Ciccone was added as well. Coppola did not appear in the finished film.

Principal photography began on May 7, 2018, in New York City, and wrapped in September 2018.

== Release ==
The Kitchen was released on August 9, 2019, by Warner Bros. Pictures.

=== Home media ===
The Kitchen was released on Digital Download on October 22, 2019, and on DVD and Blu-ray November 5, 2019, by Warner Bros. Home Entertainment.

== Reception ==
=== Box office ===
In the United States and Canada, The Kitchen was released alongside Dora and the Lost City of Gold, The Art of Racing in the Rain, Scary Stories to Tell in the Dark and Brian Banks, and was projected to gross $9–14 million in its opening weekend. Playing at 2,742 theaters, it was the smallest wide release of McCarthy's career. After making $1.8 million on its first day, estimates were lowered to $5–6 million.

The film ended up debuting to $5.5 million, the worst opening weekend of both McCarthy and Haddish's careers. The film dropped 60% in its second weekend to $2.2 million before being pulled from 2,125 theaters in its third weekend and making just $342,506. The Hollywood Reporter estimated the film would lose "tens of millions" for the studio, although noted it could find success in home media.

=== Critical response ===
On Rotten Tomatoes, the film has an approval percentage of 24% based on 232 reviews and a rating of 4.50 out of 10. The critics consensus reads: "With three talented leads struggling to prop up a sagging story, The Kitchen is a jumbled crime thriller in urgent need of some heavy-duty renovation." On Metacritic, the film has a score of 35 out of 100 based on 42 critic reviews, meaning "Generally Unfavorable". Audiences polled by CinemaScore gave the film an average grade of "B−" on an A+ to F scale.

Variety's Owen Gleiberman described the film as "just like Widows, except not as good." Gleiberman was critical of the script but praised McCarthy's fierce performance, wished Tiffany Haddish had more to do, and that Margo Martindale had a bigger role. Ty Burr of The Boston Globe wrote, "There's only one Scorsese, and he ain't here."

Mick LaSalle of the San Francisco Chronicle wrote: "Speaking of female gangsters, no review of The Kitchen should overlook Margo Martindale, who steals every scene she's in as a mob matriarch – a gravelly voiced monster with a gutter mouth and a big photo of John F. Kennedy on her wall. Martindale gets to be evil and has as much fun onscreen as she can without smiling."
