= Klein Time =

Klein Time is a 1977 sketch comedy pilot by Robert Klein, which was never picked up for a full show. It featured Michael Keaton, Peter Boyle, and Madeline Kahn.
