= List of awards and nominations received by Michael Keaton =

Michael Keaton awards and nominations
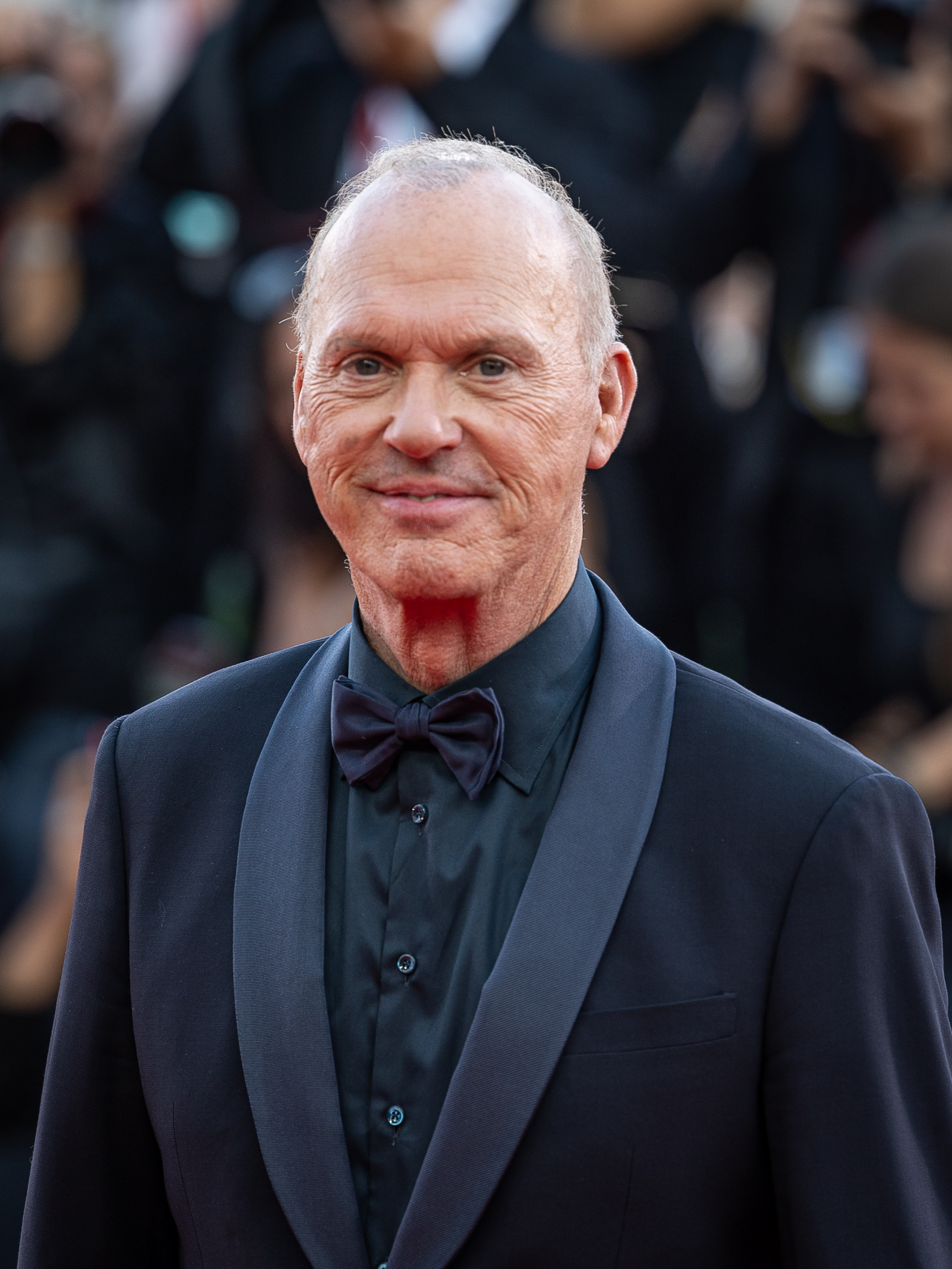
- Keaton at the 2024 Venice Film Festival
Awards and nominations
Award	Wins	Nominations
Actor Awards	4	6
Academy Awards	0	1
BAFTA Awards	0	1
Emmy Awards	1	3
Golden Globe Awards	2	3

Totals (Note: Certain award groups do not simply award one winner. They acknowledge several different recipients, have runners-up, and have third place. Since this is a specific recognition and is different from losing an award, runner-up mentions are considered wins in this award tally. For simplification and to avoid errors, each award in this list has been presumed to have had a prior nomination.)
- Wins: 70
- Nominations: 122

Michael Keaton is an American actor known for his leading roles on film and television. He has received a Primetime Emmy Award, two Golden Globe Awards and four Actor Awards as well as nominations for an Academy Award and a BAFTA Award.

Keaton was nominated for the Academy Award for Best Actor for his role as a fading film star attempting his comeback in the Alejandro González Iñárritu dark comedy film Birdman or (The Unexpected Virtue of Ignorance) (2014). The role also earned him the Golden Globe Award for Best Actor in a Musical or Comedy as well as nominations for the Screen Actors Guild Award for Outstanding Performance by a Male Actor in a Leading Role and the British Academy Film Award for Best Actor. He was nominated for the Screen Actors Guild Award for Outstanding Performance by a Cast in a Motion Picture along with the ensembles of Birdman, Spotlight (2015), and The Trial of the Chicago 7 (2021).

For his roles on television, he won the Primetime Emmy Award for Outstanding Lead Actor in a Limited or Anthology Series or Movie for playing Dr. Samuel Finnix in the Hulu limited series Dopesick (2022). The role also earned him the Golden Globe Award for Best Actor – Miniseries or Television Film and the Actor Award for Outstanding Performance by a Male Actor in a Miniseries or Television Movie. He previously received a Golden Globe Award nomination for his performance as Robert Wiener, a CNN producer in the HBO film Live from Baghdad (2002) and a Screen Actors Guild Award nomination for playing James Jesus Angleton in the TNT miniseries The Company (2007).

== Major associations ==
=== Actor Awards ===
Year	Category	Nominated work	Result	Ref.
2008	Outstanding Male Actor in a Miniseries or Television Movie	The Company	Nominated	
2015	Outstanding Male Actor in a Leading Role	Birdman	Nominated	
2015	Outstanding Cast in a Motion Picture	Birdman	Won	
2016	Outstanding Cast in a Motion Picture	Spotlight	Won	
2021	Outstanding Cast in a Motion Picture	The Trial of the Chicago 7	Won	
2022	Outstanding Male Actor in a Miniseries or Television Movie	Dopesick	Won	

=== Academy Awards ===
Year	Category	Nominated work	Result	Ref.
2015	Best Actor	Birdman	Nominated	

=== BAFTA Awards ===
British Academy Film Awards
Year	Category	Nominated work	Result	Ref.
2015	Best Actor in a Leading Role	Birdman	Nominated	

=== Emmy Awards ===
Primetime Emmy Awards
Year	Category	Nominated work	Result	Ref.
2004	Outstanding Nonfiction Special	Fred Rogers: America's Favorite Neighbor	Nominated	
2022	Outstanding Limited or Anthology Series	Dopesick	Nominated	
2022	Outstanding Lead Actor in a Limited Series or Movie	Dopesick	Won	

=== Golden Globe Awards ===
Year	Category	Nominated work	Result	Ref.
2003	Best Actor – Miniseries or Television Film	Live from Baghdad	Nominated	
2015	Best Actor – Motion Picture Musical or Comedy	Birdman	Won	
2022	Best Actor – Miniseries or Television Film	Dopesick	Won	

== Film Critics awards ==
Organizations	Year	Category	Project	Result	Ref.
Alliance of Women Film Journalists	2014	Best Actor	Birdman	Won	
Alliance of Women Film Journalists	2015	Best Ensemble Cast	Spotlight	Won	
Boston Society of Film Critics	2014	Best Actor	Birdman	Won	
Boston Society of Film Critics	2014	Best Cast	Birdman	Runner-up	
Boston Society of Film Critics	2015	Best Cast	Spotlight	Won	
Chicago Film Critics Association	2014	Best Actor	Birdman	Won	
Dallas–Fort Worth Film Critics Association	2014	Best Actor	Birdman	Won	
Detroit Film Critics Society	2014	Best Actor	Birdman	Won	
Detroit Film Critics Society	2014	Best Ensemble	Birdman	Won	
Detroit Film Critics Society	2015	Best Ensemble	Spotlight	Won	
Florida Film Critics Circle	2014	Best Actor	Birdman	Won	
Florida Film Critics Circle	2014	Best Cast	Birdman	Nominated	
Florida Film Critics Circle	2015	Best Cast	Spotlight	Won	
Houston Film Critics Society	2014	Best Actor	Birdman	Nominated	
London Film Critics' Circle	2014	Actor of the Year	Birdman	Won	
London Film Critics' Circle	2015	Supporting Actor of the Year	Spotlight	Nominated	
Los Angeles Film Critics Association	2014	Best Actor	Birdman	2nd place	
National Board of Review	2014	Best Actor	Birdman	Won	
National Society of Film Critics	1988	Best Actor	Beetlejuice	Won	
National Society of Film Critics	1988	Best Actor	Clean and Sober	Won	
New York Film Critics Circle	2015	Best Actor	Spotlight	Won	
New York Film Critics Online	2014	Best Ensemble Cast	Birdman	Won	
New York Film Critics Online	2015	Best Ensemble Cast	Spotlight	Won	
Online Film Critics Society	2014	Best Actor	Spotlight	Won	
San Diego Film Critics Society	2014	Best Actor	Birdman	Nominated	
San Diego Film Critics Society	2014	Best Ensemble	Birdman	Won	
San Diego Film Critics Society	2015	Best Ensemble	Spotlight	Nominated	
San Diego Film Critics Society	2024	Best Comedic Performance	Beetlejuice Beetlejuice	Runner-up	
San Francisco Film Critics Circle	2014	Best Actor	Birdman	Won	
St. Louis Gateway Film Critics Association	2014	Best Actor	Birdman	Nominated	
Vancouver Film Critics Circle	2014	Best Actor	Birdman	Nominated	
Washington D.C. Area Film Critics Association	2014	Best Actor	Birdman	Won	
Washington D.C. Area Film Critics Association	2014	Best Ensemble	Birdman	Won	
Washington D.C. Area Film Critics Association	2015	Best Ensemble	Spotlight	Won	

== Miscellaneous awards ==
Organizations	Year	Category	Project	Result	Ref.
AACTA Awards	2014	Best International Lead Actor	Birdman	Won	
AARP Movies for Grownups Award	2015	Best Supporting Role	Spotlight	Nominated	
AARP Movies for Grownups Award	2017	Best Actor	The Founder	Nominated	
Capri Hollywood International Film Festival	2017	Best Actor	The Founder	Won	
Critics' Choice Movie Awards	2014	Best Comedy Movie Actor	Birdman	Won	
Critics' Choice Movie Awards	2014	Best Movie Actor	Birdman	Won	
Critics' Choice Movie Awards	2014	Best Movie Cast	Birdman	Won	
Critics' Choice Movie Awards	2015	Best Movie Cast	Spotlight	Won	
Critics' Choice Movie Awards	2020	Best Movie Cast	The Trial of the Chicago 7	Won	
Critics' Choice Movie Awards	2021	Best Actor in a Limited Series or Movie Made for Television	Dopesick	Won	
Gotham Awards	2014	Best Film Actor	Birdman	Won	
Gotham Awards	2015	Best Film Ensemble	Spotlight	Won	
Gotham Awards	2020	Best Film Ensemble	The Trial of the Chicago 7	Won	
Independent Spirit Awards	2014	Best Male Lead	Birdman	Won	
Independent Spirit Awards	2015	Robert Altman Award	Spotlight	Won	
MTV Movie Awards	1993	Best Kiss	Batman Returns	Nominated	
MTV Movie Awards	2015	Best Fight (with Edward Norton)	Birdman	Nominated	
Nickelodeon Kids' Choice Awards	2025	Favorite Villain	Beetlejuice Beetlejuice	Nominated	
Satellite Awards	2015	Best Actor – Motion Picture	Birdman	Won	
Satellite Awards	2016	Supporting Actor – Motion Picture	Spotlight	Nominated	
Satellite Awards	2016	Best Cast in a Motion Picture	Spotlight	Won	
Satellite Awards	2022	Best Actor – Miniseries or Television Film	Dopesick	Nominated	
Saturn Awards	1989	Best Supporting Actor	Beetlejuice	Nominated	
Saturn Awards	2015	Best Actor	Birdman	Nominated	
Saturn Awards	2018	Best Supporting Actor	Spider-Man: Homecoming	Nominated	
Saturn Awards	2024	Best Supporting Actor	The Flash	Nominated	
Saturn Awards	2025	Best Actor in a Film	Beetlejuice Beetlejuice	Nominated	
Teen Choice Awards	2005	Choice Movie: Scary Scene	White Noise	Nominated	

== Honorary awards ==
Organizations	Year	Notes	Result	Ref.
Cinequest San Jose Film Festival	2008	Maverick Spirit Award	Honored	
Zurich Film Festival	2009	Career Achievement Award	Honored	
Santa Barbara International Film Festival	2015	Modern Master Award	Honored	
Hollywood Film Awards	2015	Career Achievement Award	Honored	
Hollywood Walk of Fame	2016	Star on the Walk of Fame	Honored	
Pittsburgh Walk of Fame	2025	Star on the Walk of Fame	Honored	
Harvard University	2026	Hasty Pudding Man of the Year	Honored	
Art Rooney Award	2026	Daniel M. Rooney Ambassador's Award	Honored	

== Honorary degrees ==
Organizations	Year	Notes	Ref.
Carnegie Mellon University	2017	Honorary Doctor of Fine Arts degree	
Kent State University	2018	Honorary Doctor of Humane Letters	
