= Worth (film) =

2020 biographical film

- Official release poster
- Directed by: Sara Colangelo
- Written by: Max Borenstein
- Based on: What Is Life Worth? by Kenneth Feinberg (inspiration)
- Produced by: Marc Butan; Anthony Katagas; Michael Sugar; Bard Dorros; Sean Sorensen; Max Borenstein; Michael Keaton
- Starring: Michael Keaton; Stanley Tucci; Amy Ryan; Tate Donovan; Talia Balsam; Laura Benanti
- Cinematography: Pepe Avila del Pino
- Edited by: Julia Bloch
- Music by: Nico Muhly
- Production companies: MadRiver Pictures; Anonymous Content; Sugar23; Royal Viking Entertainment; Steeplechase Amusements
- Distributed by: Netflix; Higher Ground Productions
- Release dates: January 24, 2020 (Sundance); August 27, 2021 (United States)
- Running time: 118 minutes
- Country: United States
- Language: English
- Box office: $106,645

Worth is a 2020 American biographical film written and co-produced by Max Borenstein and directed by Sara Colangelo. Based on the memoir by lawyer Kenneth Feinberg, the film depicts Feinberg's handling of the September 11th Victim Compensation Fund. It stars Michael Keaton, Stanley Tucci, Amy Ryan, Tate Donovan, Talia Balsam, and Laura Benanti. The film premiered at 2020 Sundance Film Festival on January 24, 2020, where it was acquired by Netflix and Higher Ground Productions. The film was given a limited theatrical release in the United States on August 27, 2021, followed by a streaming release on Netflix on September 3.

== Plot ==
After the September 11 attacks occur, Kenneth Feinberg is appointed the Special Master of the September 11th Victim Compensation Fund while his law partner, Camille Biros, is appointed as his administrative deputy. Feinberg develops a rigid formula for each payout based on the victim's income, and is instructed that if he cannot convince at least 80 percent of the 7,000 estimated victims to sign on then they will be eligible to file a lawsuit which they may lose (as well as the pressure from the political administrations to save the airlines from being sued, leading to financial disaster). Feinberg is given until December 22, 2003, to accomplish this.

At an introductory meeting with victims in which he attempts to explain the rules governing the fund, Feinberg is perceived as insensitive to the losses suffered by attendees. The hostile group is calmed when Charles Wolf, the husband of a woman killed in the attacks, demands that they listen to what Feinberg has to say. After the meeting, Feinberg is confronted by Frank Donato, the brother of a deceased New York City Fire Department (FDNY) firefighter, Nick. His brother had re-entered the tower to find him after communication, which may not have reached Nick, warned that the building would fail. Frank demands that Feinberg includes this information in the report to remedy this flaw in the communication system for first responders. Feinberg deflects that demand in lawyerly fashion. Feinberg also is disturbed to learn that Wolf was offended by the callous nature of the fund's formula and has started a protest group.

Biros leads the staff in holding meetings with victims and is moved by the story of a gay man, Graham Morris, whose partner (whose parents vehemently denied that their son was gay) was killed in the attack. Due to the rules governing the fund, he cannot be compensated as he is a resident of the state of Virginia, which does not recognize civil partnerships. Feinberg also meets with several lawyers representing the loved ones of upper-class victims of the attacks, who want more money, which threatens the success of the group as a whole. As the months drag on, the fund manages to attract only a fraction of the necessary applicants, leading Feinberg to hold a private meeting with Wolf in which the latter accuses Feinberg of serving only the interests of the Bush administration.

A lawyer representing Donato's extra-marital partner calls Feinberg to inform him that Donato has two daughters from that relationship who qualify for compensation. This leads Feinberg to try to inform Donato's widow to convince her to sign on after she had earlier refused. As the months drag on, Feinberg is increasingly unsuccessful in convincing victims to file for compensation from the government fund. After Wolf approaches him one evening at the opera and recounts an anecdote from years earlier in which his deceased wife encouraged him to persevere in the face of failure, Feinberg finds his spirit renewed.

Feinberg and Biros begin to use the discretion that the government gave him to expand the rules to cover as many victims as they can under the fund. Feinberg begins to meet victims. He constructs a shrine in his office from the various mementos given to him by fund applicants. When Wolf sees that Feinberg truly cares for the victims of the attacks, he is able to convince his fellow victims to trust Feinberg. By the deadline, the vast majority of those eligible for compensation sign the forms, ensuring the success of the project. Feinberg is visited by Donato's widow to sign on behalf of her husband's children. Biros tearfully calls Morris to inform him that while she was unable to help him as the gay partner of a victim, because his state did not recognize their relationship, the fund did compensate many other gay couples who lived in states that recognized same-sex unions. The film ends with a title card stating that Feinberg and Biros were able to distribute billions in government money to 97 percent of eligible victims and that they continue to work on similar cases.

== Cast ==
- Michael Keaton as Kenneth Feinberg
- Stanley Tucci as Charles Wolf
- Amy Ryan as Camille Biros
- Tate Donovan as Lee Quinn
- Shunori Ramanathan as Priya Khundi
- Laura Benanti as Karen Donato
- Talia Balsam as Diane Shaff, Feinberg's wife
- Marc Maron as Bart Cuthbert
- Chris Tardio as Frank Donato
- Victor Slezak as John Ashcroft
- Gayle Rankin as Maya
- Catherine Curtin as Joan
- Johanna Day as Ruth
- James Ciccone as James

== Production ==
The project was announced during the 2018 Berlin Film Festival, with David Frankel directing from a screenplay by Max Borenstein, which was featured in the 2008 Black List. Michael Keaton was cast to play the role of Kenneth Feinberg. Sales for the film took place at the 2018 Cannes Film Festival. In February 2019, Sara Colangelo replaced Frankel as director and Stanley Tucci was added to the cast. In March, Shunori Ramanathan and Victor Slezak were cast. In April 2019, Laura Benanti, Amy Ryan, Talia Balsam and Tate Donovan joined the cast of the film.

=== Filming ===
Principal photography began in April 2019.

== Release ==
It had its world premiere at the Sundance Film Festival on January 24, 2020. In February 2021, Netflix and Higher Ground Productions acquired distribution rights to the film. It was released in a limited release and on Netflix on September 3, 2021.

== Reception ==
According to review aggregator website Rotten Tomatoes, 82% of 99 critic reviews are positive, with an average rating of 7.1/10. The website's critics consensus reads, "It isn't as hard-hitting as one might expect, but Worth remains a powerfully performed and rewardingly complex dramatization of real-life events." On Metacritic, it has a weighted average score of 67 out of 100 based on 25 critics, indicating "generally favorable reviews".
