= Kenneth Feinberg =

American attorney (born 1945)

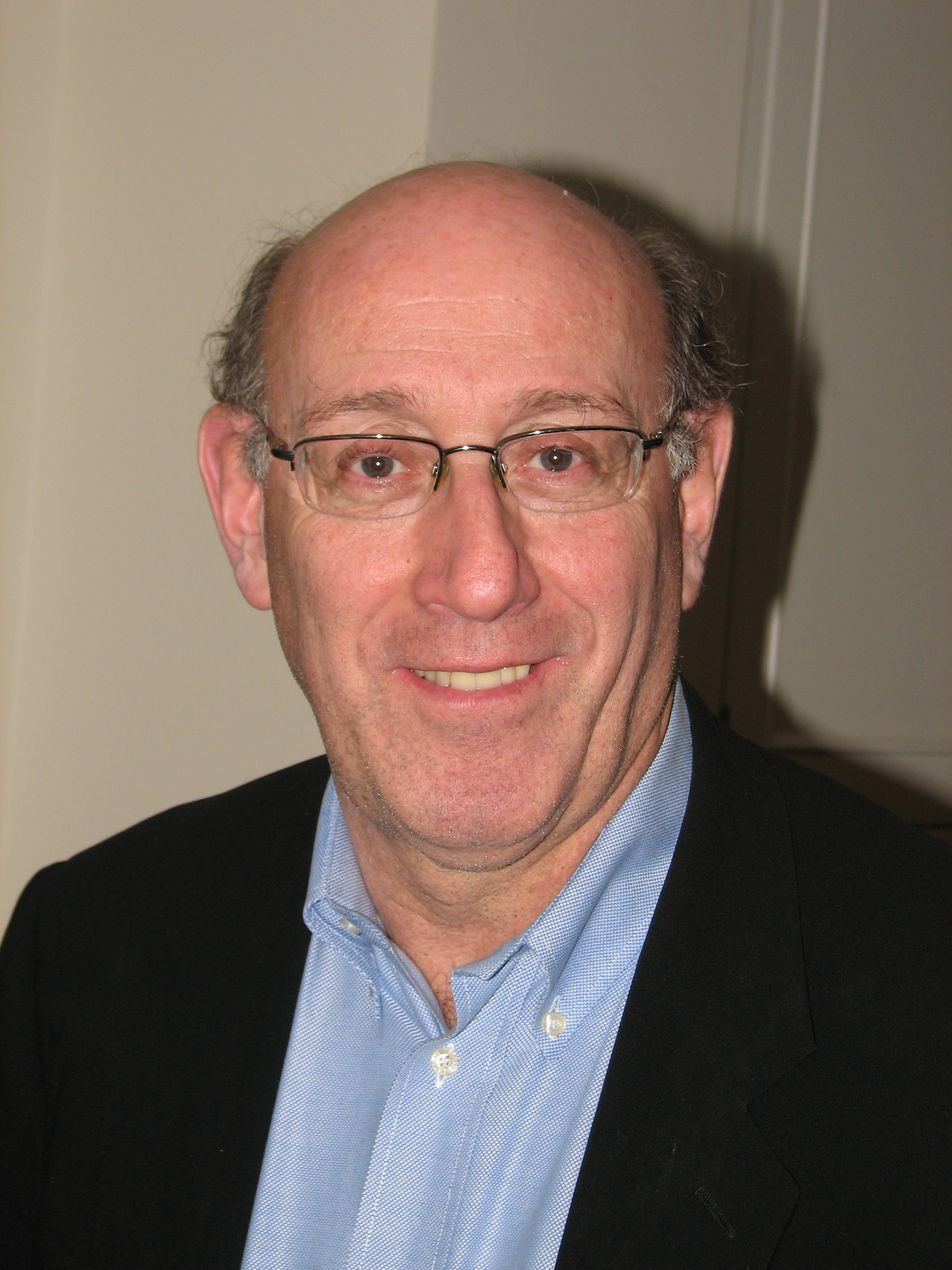
- Feinberg in October 2007
- Born: Kenneth Roy Feinberg; October 23, 1945 (age 81); Brockton, Massachusetts, U.S.
- Education: University of Massachusetts Amherst (BA); New York University (JD)
- Occupation: Attorney
- Known for: Special Master, September 11th Victim Compensation Fund; Special Master for Executive Compensation
- Spouse: Diane Shaff (3 children)

Kenneth Roy Feinberg (born October 23, 1945) is an American attorney specializing in mediation and alternative dispute resolution. He served as the Chief of Staff to Senator Ted Kennedy, Special Master of the U.S. government's September 11th Victim Compensation Fund and the Special Master for TARP Executive Compensation. Additionally, Feinberg served as the government-appointed administrator of the BP Deepwater Horizon Disaster Victim Compensation Fund. Feinberg was also appointed by the Commonwealth of Massachusetts to administer the One Fund—the victim assistance fund established in the wake of the 2013 Boston Marathon bombing.

Feinberg was retained by General Motors to assist in their recall response and by Volkswagen to oversee their U.S. compensation of VW diesel owners affected by the Volkswagen emissions scandal. Feinberg was hired by The Boeing Company in July 2019, to oversee distribution of $50 million to support 737 MAX crash victim families. Feinberg is also an adjunct professor at the Columbia University School of Law, University of Pennsylvania Law School, Georgetown University Law Center, New York University School of Law, the University of Virginia School of Law and at the Benjamin N. Cardozo School of Law.

== Life and career ==
Feinberg was born to a Jewish family in Brockton, Massachusetts. He received a Bachelor of Arts from the University of Massachusetts-Amherst in 1967 and a J.D. degree from the New York University School of Law in 1970. He worked for five years as an administrative assistant and chief of staff for U.S. Senator Ted Kennedy and as a prosecutor for the U.S. Attorney General. Before founding his own firm The Feinberg Group (now the Law Offices of Kenneth Feinberg) in 1993, he was a founding partner at the Washington office of Kaye Scholer LLP.

Feinberg has served as Court-Appointed Special Settlement Master in cases including Agent Orange product liability litigation, Asbestos Personal Injury Litigation and DES Cases. Feinberg was also one of three arbitrators who determined the fair market value of the Zapruder film of the Kennedy assassination and was one of two arbitrators who determined the allocation of legal fees in the Holocaust slave labor litigation. He is a former Lecturer-in-Law at a number of U.S. law schools. Feinberg was the Chairman of the Board of Directors for the John F. Kennedy Library Foundation.

=== September 11 Victim Compensation Fund ===
Appointed by Attorney General John Ashcroft to be Special Master of the fund, Feinberg worked for 33 months entirely pro bono. He developed the regulations governing the administration of the fund and administered all aspects of the program, including evaluating applications, determining appropriate compensation and disseminating awards.

==== History of participation ====
Early in the process he was described as aloof and arrogant. Feinberg was subjected to some very public criticism at meetings, in the media and on Web sites. "I underestimated the emotion of this at the beginning", Feinberg has said. "I didn't fully appreciate how soon this program had been established after 9/11, so there was a certain degree of unanticipated anger directed at me that I should have been more attuned to."

It was up to Feinberg to make the decisions on how much each family of a 9/11 victim would receive. It's a brutal, sort of cold, thing to do. Anybody who looks at this program and expects that by cutting a U.S. Treasury check, you are going to make 9/11 families happy, is vastly misunderstanding what's going on with this program," said Feinberg. "There is not one family member I've met who wouldn't gladly give back the check, or, in many cases, their own lives to have that loved one back. 'Happy' never enters into this equation."

Feinberg was able to change the mind of some of his harshest critics. Charles Wolf, whose wife died in the north tower, renamed his highly critical Web site called "Fix the Fund" to "The Fund is Fixed!" At first he called Feinberg "patronizing, manipulative and at times, even cruel." He later remarked, "To have one of your sharpest critics follow through on a promise and not only join the program he was criticizing, but promote it to his peers, says a lot about you and the way you have adjusted both the program and your attitude...Today, I have complete faith in you." In 2005 his book, titled What is Life Worth?: The Unprecedented Effort to Compensate the Victims of 9/11 was published. Feinberg wrote that a widow of one firefighter cursed him, saying "I spit on you, and your children," for being unfair in his compensation awards.

==== The eight-part Feinberg plan ====
In his book titled What is Life Worth?, Feinberg described the eight-part plan which was applied to approaching the September 11 Victim Compensation Fund.

1. Identifying someone with sufficient and exceptionally broad experience in mass tort action mediation, litigation, and settlement, which Feinberg possessed through his previous personal experience as a political activist and his work in the Agent Orange compensation settlement.
2. To support and follow the law regarding the proportional compensation of victims based on estimated losses from future earnings, by hiring a full staff of accountants and attorneys to track and service each claim individually.
3. Accumulate all the reports and applications, along with counter-claims to gauge and initiate the direct compensation process.
4. The value of informed discretion in compensating claimants under the formula of keeping compensation under the rule of thumb that 85% of the money should not go to 15% of the 'richest' claimant families, by narrowing the gap between the largest and the smallest compensations paid to claimants.
5. With a mind to the future, the process of the program should be maintained and serviced as a precedent for future courts to use in future compensation cases as needed. The actions taken should be uniform in their approach.
6. There would be "no substitute for hard work and legal craftsmanship" of rigorous intellectual honesty.
7. The support of Senator Edward Kennedy would be recognized throughout the process.
8. Lawsuits were to be discouraged as contrary to the spirit of the law establishing the compensation fund.

=== Hokie Spirit Memorial Fund ===
On July 5, 2007, a Virginia Tech press release said that Feinberg would work pro bono as the chief administrator to the Hokie Spirit Memorial Fund (HSMF). The HSMF was set up by the Virginia Tech Foundation in the aftermath of the April 16, 2007, shooting attacks on the Virginia Tech campus.

=== Special Master for Executive Compensation ===
On June 10, 2009, Feinberg was appointed by the U.S. Treasury Department to oversee the compensation of top executives at companies which have received federal bailout assistance. As part of his policies, he has suggested to many bank executives that they emphasize long-term stock compensation rather than cash payments. Treasury Secretary Timothy Geithner, in a statement about Feinberg's rulings on executive pay, said, "We all share an interest in seeing these companies return taxpayer dollars as soon as possible, and Ken today has helped bring that day a little bit closer."

=== BP oil spill fund ===
On June 16, 2010, it was reported that Feinberg was to run a $20 billion fund to pay claims for the BP oil spill. President Obama said that the $20 billion from BP "will not be controlled by either BP or by the government. It will be put in an escrow account administered by an impartial, independent third party." Obama said he and BP's chairman, Carl-Henric Svanberg, agreed on having Feinberg administer the fund. Feinberg was also selected by Obama to oversee the compensation of top executives at bailed out banks.

BP is agreed to pay Feinberg's six-lawyer Washington, D.C., firm, Feinberg Rozen, a flat fee of $1,250,000 a month for labor and overhead costs, but the full details of compensation are unknown. Feinberg has come under harsh criticism from public interest groups for refusing to disclose the amount of his compensation or the details of his arrangement with the company. On December 6, 2010, the Center for Justice & Democracy (CJ&D) sent a letter to Robert Dudley, the CEO of BP, concerning "serious new issues raised about the lack of transparency and potential conflicts of interest related to the administration of the Gulf Coast Claims Facility." In the letter, CJ&D pointed out actions taken by Feinberg in the administration of the compensation fund that point to serious conflicts of interest:

Mr. Feinberg, employed by BP, has decided on his own authority that all claims recipients must release all companies who caused this disaster from any and all legal responsibility, no matter how grossly negligent they were. This sweeping release, which assigns victims' claims to BP, benefits only one actor: BP – the company that happens to pay Mr. Feinberg's salary.

In January 2011, Judge Barbier, the federal judge over the oil spill litigation, after hearing evidence and arguments of the attorneys, ruled that Kenneth Feinberg was not independent of BP and could no longer claim to be so. Feinberg had been telling victims he was their lawyer and did not answer to BP. The letter also criticized Feinberg's lack of transparency in the matter of compensation:

Despite repeated calls for the release of documents establishing the formal relationship between BP and Feinberg Rozen, as well as its subcontractors who are reviewing and adjudicating claims, almost nothing has been publicly released. And now we learn, as reported by Reuters on November 22, 2010, that BP and Feinberg Rozen consider their arrangement 'verbal,' i.e., they have not committed to writing the firm's compensation arrangement so there can be no public examination of it. Is the public to believe that there is no paper evidence at all documenting a $10 million per year financial arrangement between BP and Feinberg Rozen? What about the contracts between BP, Feinberg Rozen and the subcontractors who are advising and adjudicating claims and also being paid directly by BP? Surely these contracts must be in writing and released. This failure to release the terms of all these financial arrangements under circumstances of tremendous historic and public significance is simply unacceptable.

=== Penn State settlement ===
On September 12, 2012, Feinberg was hired by Penn State University to aid in the settlement of dozens of personal injury claims against the institution stemming from the sex abuse scandal involving Jerry Sandusky. Four months later, Feinberg said that he expected settlement discussions with 28 people to yield results within a matter of weeks.

=== Aurora victim relief fund ===
Feinberg oversaw the disbursement of donations to the injured victims and families of the deceased in the Aurora, Colorado, movie theater shooting that left 12 people dead and 70 others wounded.

=== Newtown-Sandy Hook Community Foundation ===
In June 2013, Newtown-Sandy Hook Community Foundation was given permission from the Connecticut Attorney General to distribute $7.7 million from the fund. A committee of three, headed by a retired U.S. District Court judge, was being advised by Kenneth Feinberg.

=== General Motors car recall ===
On April 1, 2014, General Motors announced it had retained Feinberg to handle part of its response to a widely reported product safety recall. GM said Feinberg would serve as a consultant "to explore and evaluate options in its response to families of accident victims whose vehicles are being recalled for possible ignition switch defects."

=== Special Master to Oversee Treasury Implementation of Multiemployer Pension Reform Act Regulations ===
The U.S. Department of the Treasury released proposed and temporary regulations to implement the Kline-Miller Multiemployer Pension Reform Act of 2014, as required by Congress. In Kline-Miller, Congress established a new process for multiemployer pension plans to propose a temporary or permanent reduction of pension benefits if the plan is projected to run out of money. As part of Treasury's commitment to ensuring an open and fair process, Treasury Secretary Jacob J. Lew appointed Kenneth Feinberg as a Special Master to help provide a dedicated, impartial and informed review of applications proposing to reduce pension benefits. Feinberg will oversee Treasury's implementation of Kline-Miller, including the review of applications to determine whether they meet the requirements set by Congress. He will also ensure that affected stakeholders have a single point of contact dedicated to this process.

=== Volkswagen emission scandal ===
In February 2016, it was announced that Feinberg would be heading up the compensation fund for Volkswagen. This fund will be established to compensate the roughly 600,000 U.S. owners of diesel vehicles whose emissions are over the legal limit.

=== Terrorism compensation fund ===
In March 2016, the United States Department of Justice appointed Feinberg to oversee the Victims of State Sponsored Terrorism Fund.

=== In re Foreign Exchange and Benchmark Rates Antitrust Litigation ===
As a mediator, Kenneth Feinberg served as a mediator to help resolve price-fixing antitrust claims brought against a group of financial institutions. Working as the agreed-upon neutral, he helped secure comprehensive settlements in the billions of dollars, and thereafter helped to design and administer a compensation program to distribute settlement proceeds to eligible claimants.

=== Archdiocese of New York Independent Reconciliation and Compensation Program ===
In 2016, the Archdiocese of New York established the Independent Reconciliation and Compensation Program run by Kenneth Feinberg. This Independent Reconciliation and Compensation Program (the "IRCP") follows in the wake of initiatives already implemented by the Archdiocese of New York (the "Archdiocese") to address the problem of sexual abuse of minors alleged against clergy of the Archdiocese. The IRCP is a new program designed to compensate eligible victims of abuse. During past years, the Archdiocese has received various individual complaints alleging sexual abuse by clergy of the Archdiocese. This Protocol outlines the eligibility criteria requirements and the process for these individuals to submit and resolve claims alleging such sexual abuse. This Protocol governs only those individual claims previously submitted to the Archdiocese and will be considered Phase I of a two-phase Program.

=== United Methodist Church ===
In 2019, Feinberg worked pro bono to mediate the impasse between representatives of factions within the United Methodist Church regarding its position on homosexuality. Consequently on January 3, 2020, the parties unanimously agreed to present a plan to the 2020 General Conference to spin off one or more traditionalist denominations and allow churches and denominations to leave or remain, while dividing church assets.

=== Roundup Product Litigation ===
In 2021, Feinberg was appointed as the Special Master in the Roundup Product Multi-District Litigation by the United States District Court, Northern California District. Feinberg is once again determining the value of a person's life to help Bayer settle thousands of law suits.

== Personal life ==
Feinberg and his wife, Diane ("Dede") Shaff, have three children and four grandchildren. He was awarded an honorary Doctor of Humane Letters and gave the commencement address at Saint Anselm College in 2023.

== In popular culture ==
- Worth, a 2020 biographical film directed by Sara Colangelo, depicts Kenneth Feinberg's handling of the September 11th Victim Compensation Fund. The screenplay by Max Borenstein is based on Feinberg's 2005 book, What is Life Worth? Feinberg is portrayed by Michael Keaton and the cast includes Amy Ryan, Stanley Tucci, Tate Donovan, Shunori Ramanathan, and Laura Benanti. The film had its world premiere at the Sundance Film Festival on January 24, 2020, and was released in a limited release and on Netflix beginning September 3, 2021.

== Publications ==
- — (August 2006). What Is Life Worth?: The Inside Story of the 9/11 Fund and Its Effort to Compensate the Victims of September 11th. New York City: PublicAffairs. ISBN 978-1-58648-451-4.
- — (June 2012). Who Gets What: Fair Compensation after Tragedy and Financial Upheaval. New York City: PublicAffairs. ISBN 978-1-58648-977-9.
- — (March 2015). "Money Admonitions From 9/11". New York Times. New York.
- — (2014). "Georgia State University Law Review: Keynote Address". Georgia State University Law Review. 31 (4). Georgia.
- — (2014). "Unconventional Responses to Unique Catastrophes: Tailoring the Law to Meet the Challenges". Case W. Res. J. Int'l L. 46. Western Michigan University Cooley Law School: 525.
- — (January 2013). "The Chuck Hagel I know & trust". New York Daily News. New York.
- — (2012). "Democratization of Mass Litigation: Empowering the Beneficiaries" (PDF). Columbia Journal of Law and Social Problems. New York. Archived from the original (PDF) on December 22, 2017.
- — (2012). "Is the Class Half-Empty or Half-Full?" (PDF). Loyola University Chicago Law Journal.
- — (April 2011). "Keynote Address, Actuarial Litigation: How Statistics Can Help Resolve Big Cases" (PDF). Connecticut Insurance Law Journal Symposium. Hartford, CT. Archived from the original (PDF) on September 10, 2015.
- — (2011). "The September 11th Victim Compensation Fund of 2001: Policy and Precedent" (PDF). New York Law School Law Review. New York. Archived from the original (PDF) on April 21, 2017.
- — (2011). "Symposium on Executive Compensation". Vanderbilt Law Review. 64 (2). Nashville.
- — (September 2010). "Office of the Special Master for TARP Executive Compensation: Final Report of Special Master Kenneth R. Feinberg" (PDF). Washington, D.C.: U.S. Department of Treasury.
- — (October 2009). "Pay Czar Feinberg's Testimony to House Oversight Panel". Washington, D.C.: House Committee on Oversight and Government Reform.
- — (2009). "Keynote Presentation: The Sixth John A. Speziale Alternative Dispute Resolution Symposium". 27 (3). Quinnipiac University School of Law.
- — (2009). "Reexamining the Arguments in Owen M. Fiss, Against Settlement". Fordham Law Review.
- — (2009). "Transparency and Civil Justice: The Internal and External Value of Sunlight". DePaul Law Review.
- — (2008). "Tributes to Justice Stephen G. Breyer". 64 (1). New York University School of Law.
- — (January 2007). "How Can ADR Alleviate Long-Standing Social Problems?". Fordham Urban Law Journal. New York.
- — (2005). "Negotiating the September 11 Victim Compensation Fund of 2001: Mass Tort Resolution Without Litigation". Washington University Journal of Law & Policy. 19 (1). Washington University School of Law.
- — (April 2004). "Lecture, University of Alabama School of Law" (PDF). University of Alabama Law Review.
- — (January 2003). "Judge Jack B. Weinstein, Tort Litigation, and the Public Good: A Roundtable Discussion to Honor One of America's Great Trial Judges on the Occasion of his 80th Birthday". Brooklyn Law School Journal of Law and Policy.
- — (January 1998). "Reporting from the Front Line—One Mediator's Experience with Mass Torts". 31. Loyola Law School.
- — (October 1990). "The Dalkon Shield Claimants Trust". Law and Contemporary Problems. 53 (4). Duke University School of Law: 79–112. doi:10.2307/1191952. JSTOR 1191952.
- — (May 1989). "Mediation – A Preferred Method of Dispute Resolution". Pepperdine Law Review.
- — (January 1981). "Extraterritorial Jurisdiction and the Proposed Federal Criminal Code". Journal of Criminal Law and Criminology. 72 (2): 385–399. doi:10.2307/1143000. JSTOR 1143000.

== Recent awards and recognition ==
- "Flame of Tzedek Award" by The Rohr Jewish Learning Institute at The National Jewish Retreat (2019)
- "A Tribute to Excellence" by Hillel at UMass Amherst (2018)
- The Bazelon Center Outstanding Public Service Award (2017)
- The Thomas Jefferson Foundation Medalist in Law (2014)
- Yale University Legend in Leadership Award (2014)
- District of Columbia Bar Association Legend in the Law Award (2014)
- Massachusetts Bar Association Great Friend of Justice Award (2014)
- Listed in "The 100 Most Influential Lawyers in America", The National Law Journal (March 25, 2013)
- The New England Council New Englander of the Year Award (2013)
- Academy of Court Appointed Masters Civil Justice Award (2012)
- The New York University Albert Gallatin Medal for Professional Achievement (2011)
- The New York University Eugene J. Keogh Award for Distinguished Public Service (2011)
- Marshall-Wythe Medallion (2011)
- Hubert H. Humphrey Humanitarian Award (2011)
- Fordham-Stein Prize (2011)
- James F. Henry Award for Outstanding Achievement in Dispute Resolution (2010)
- "The Power 100: The 100 Most Powerful People e in Finance", Worth: The Evolution of Financial Intelligence, Vol. 19, No. 5, Page 76 (2010)
- "Lawyer of the Year" by the National Law Journal (2004)
- Presidential Advisory Commission on Human Radiation Experiments (1994 to 1998)
- Carnegie Commission Task Force on Science and Technology in Judicial and Regulatory Decision Making (1989 to 1993)
- Presidential Commission on Catastrophic Nuclear Accidents (1989 to 1990)
- Member of the National Judicial Panel, Center for Public Resources
- Chaired the American Bar Association Special Committee on Mass Torts (1988 to 1989)

== See also ==
- List of U.S. executive branch 'czars'
