= Diane Cardwell =

American journalist

Diane Cardwell is an African-American former business reporter for The New York Times focusing on renewable energy.

== Early life ==
In an interview for BULLPEN, a student-written webzine by New York University's Department of Journalism, Cardwell replied that she was born in 1964 and grew up on the Upper West Side of Manhattan. The New York Times Metro editor Joe Sexton called her a "child of Harlem". She wrote for The Harvard Crimson while an undergraduate at Harvard College.

== Career ==
Cardwell was an editor at 7 Days (1988–1990), a New York arts and entertainment weekly magazine, and a founder of Vibe.

In 1991, Cardwell wrote for Entertainment Weekly.

In 1995, The New York Times hired Cardwell as an arts and entertainment staff editor for the Sunday magazine. In 2000, Cardwell became a reporter. In 2005, The New York Times promoted Cardwell to city hall bureau chief.

Cardwell has written for New York, O, The Oprah Magazine, Details, Rolling Stone and Vogue.

In August 2021, Kerry Washington planned to produce and star in, an adaptation of Cardwell's memoir, Rockaway: Surfing Headlong Into a New Life, for Netflix.

== Works ==
- Cardwell, Diane (2020). Rockaway: Surfing Headlong Into a New Life. Houghton Mifflin Harcourt. ISBN 978-0-358-06778-8.

== Personal life ==
On 5 October 2002, Diane Cardwell married Eric Steven Nonacs.
