= Michael Keaton =

American actor (born 1951)

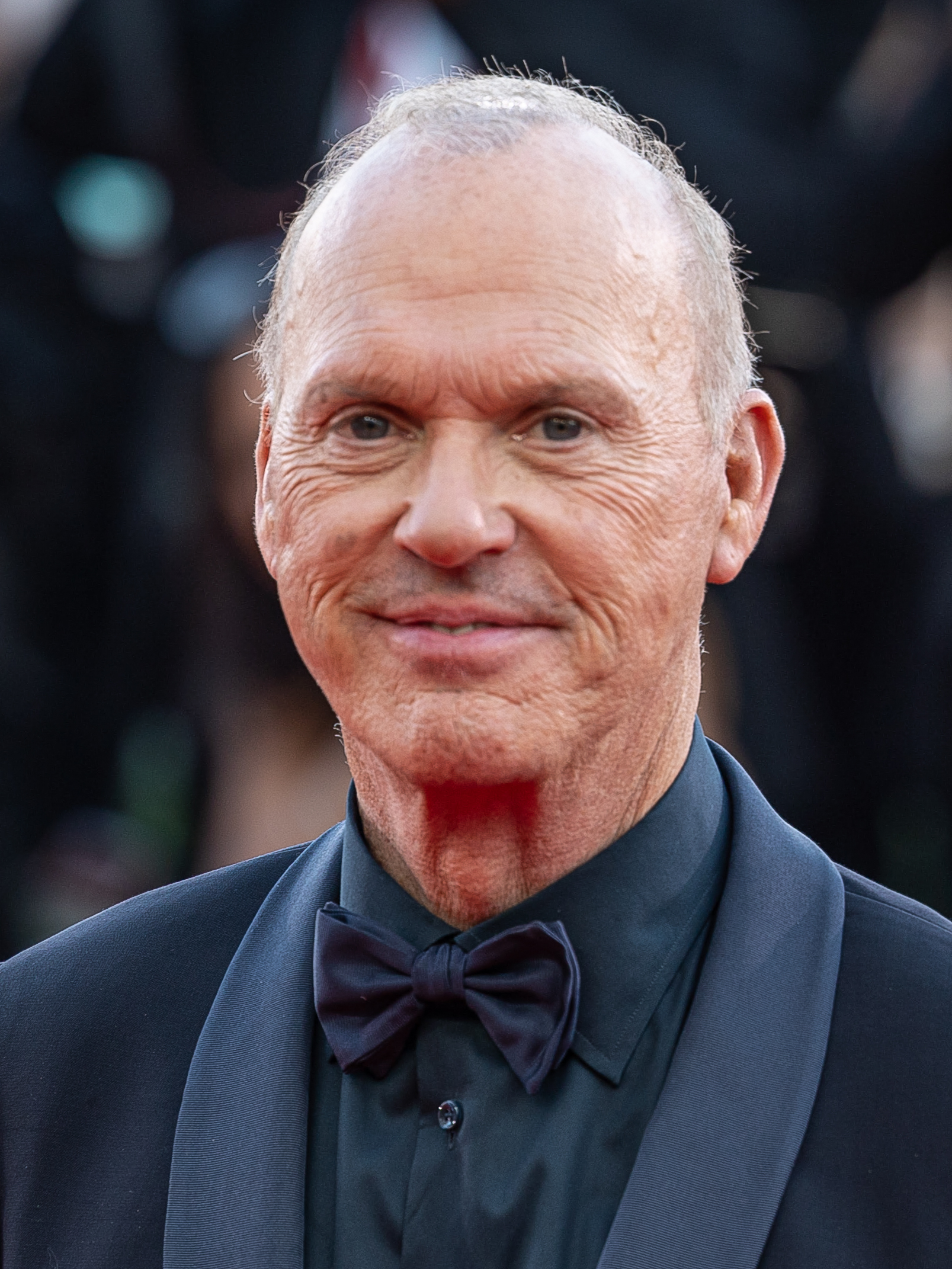
- Keaton in 2024
- Born: Michael John Douglas; September 5, 1951 (age 75); Kennedy Township, Pennsylvania, U.S.
- Other name: Michael Keaton Douglas
- Education: Kent State University
- Occupations: Actor; director; producer
- Years active: 1975–present
- Spouse: Caroline McWilliams (m. 1982; div. 1990)
- Partners: Courteney Cox (1989–1995); Marni Turner (2016–present)
- Children: Sean Douglas
- Awards: Full list

Michael John Douglas (born September 5, 1951), known professionally as Michael Keaton, is an American actor, filmmaker, and producer. His accolades include a Primetime Emmy Award and two Golden Globe Awards, in addition to nominations for an Academy Award and a BAFTA Award. In 2016, Keaton received a star on the Hollywood Walk of Fame and was named Officer of Order of Arts and Letters in France.

Keaton gained early recognition for his comedic roles in Night Shift (1982), Mr. Mom (1983), and Beetlejuice (1988). He gained wider stardom portraying the titular superhero in Batman (1989) and Batman Returns (1992). Other notable roles include Clean and Sober (1988), Much Ado About Nothing (1993), The Paper (1994), Multiplicity (1996), Jackie Brown (1997), Jack Frost (1998), First Daughter (2004), Herbie: Fully Loaded (2005), The Other Guys (2010), and Dumbo (2019). He also voiced roles in Porco Rosso (2005), Cars (2006), Toy Story 3 (2010), and Minions (2015).

Keaton experienced a career resurgence portraying a faded actor attempting a comeback in Alejandro González Iñárritu's Birdman (2014), which earned him an Academy Award nomination and his first Golden Globe Award. He has since acted in biographical dramas such as Spotlight (2015), The Founder (2016), The Trial of the Chicago 7 (2020), and Worth (2021). He portrayed the Vulture in Spider-Man: Homecoming (2017), while also reprising his roles as Batman in The Flash (2023) and the title role in Beetlejuice Beetlejuice (2024).

Keaton directed the neo-noir The Merry Gentleman (2008) and crime drama Knox Goes Away (2023), in which he also starred. On television, he starred as a journalist in the HBO film Live from Baghdad (2002) and a drug-addicted doctor in the Hulu limited series Dopesick (2021), for which he won a Golden Globe Award, a Primetime Emmy Award, and an Actors Award.

== Early life ==
Michael John Douglas, the youngest of seven children, was born at Ohio Valley Hospital in Kennedy Township, Pennsylvania, on September 5, 1951. He was raised between McKees Rocks, Coraopolis and Robinson Township, Pennsylvania. His father, George A. Douglas (1905–1977), worked as a civil engineer and surveyor, and his mother, Leona Elizabeth (née Loftus; 1909–2002), was a homemaker, and came from McKees Rocks. Keaton was raised in a Catholic family. He said he liked going to Catholic school and being an altar boy, and the school shaped who he was. His mother was of Irish descent, while his father was of Scottish, Scotch-Irish, German and English ancestry, and was originally from a Protestant family. Keaton attended Montour High School in Robinson Township, Pennsylvania. He graduated with the class of 1969, and studied speech for two years at Kent State University, where he appeared in plays, and returned to Pennsylvania to pursue his career.

== Career ==
=== 1975–1988: Early career and breakthrough ===
Keaton first appeared on television in the Pittsburgh public television programs Where the Heart Is and Mister Rogers' Neighborhood (1975). For Mister Rogers he played one of the "Flying Zucchini Brothers" and served as a full-time production assistant. (In 2003, after Fred Rogers' death, Keaton hosted a PBS memorial tribute, Fred Rogers: America's Favorite Neighbor; in 2018, he hosted a 50th anniversary special of the series for PBS, Mister Rogers: It's You I Like.) Keaton also worked as an actor in Pittsburgh theatre; he played the role of Rick in the Pittsburgh premiere of David Rabe's Sticks and Bones with the Pittsburgh Poor Players. He also performed stand-up comedy during his early years to supplement his income.

Keaton left Pittsburgh and moved to Los Angeles to begin auditioning for various television parts. He popped up in various popular television shows including Maude and The Mary Tyler Moore Hour. He decided to use a stage name to satisfy SAG rules, as there were already an actor (Michael Douglas) and daytime host (Mike Douglas) with the same or similar names. In response to questions as to whether he selected his new surname due to an attraction to actress Diane Keaton, or in homage to silent film actor Buster Keaton, he has responded by saying "it had nothing to do with that". Keaton searched a phone book under "K", saw "Keaton" and decided to stop looking.

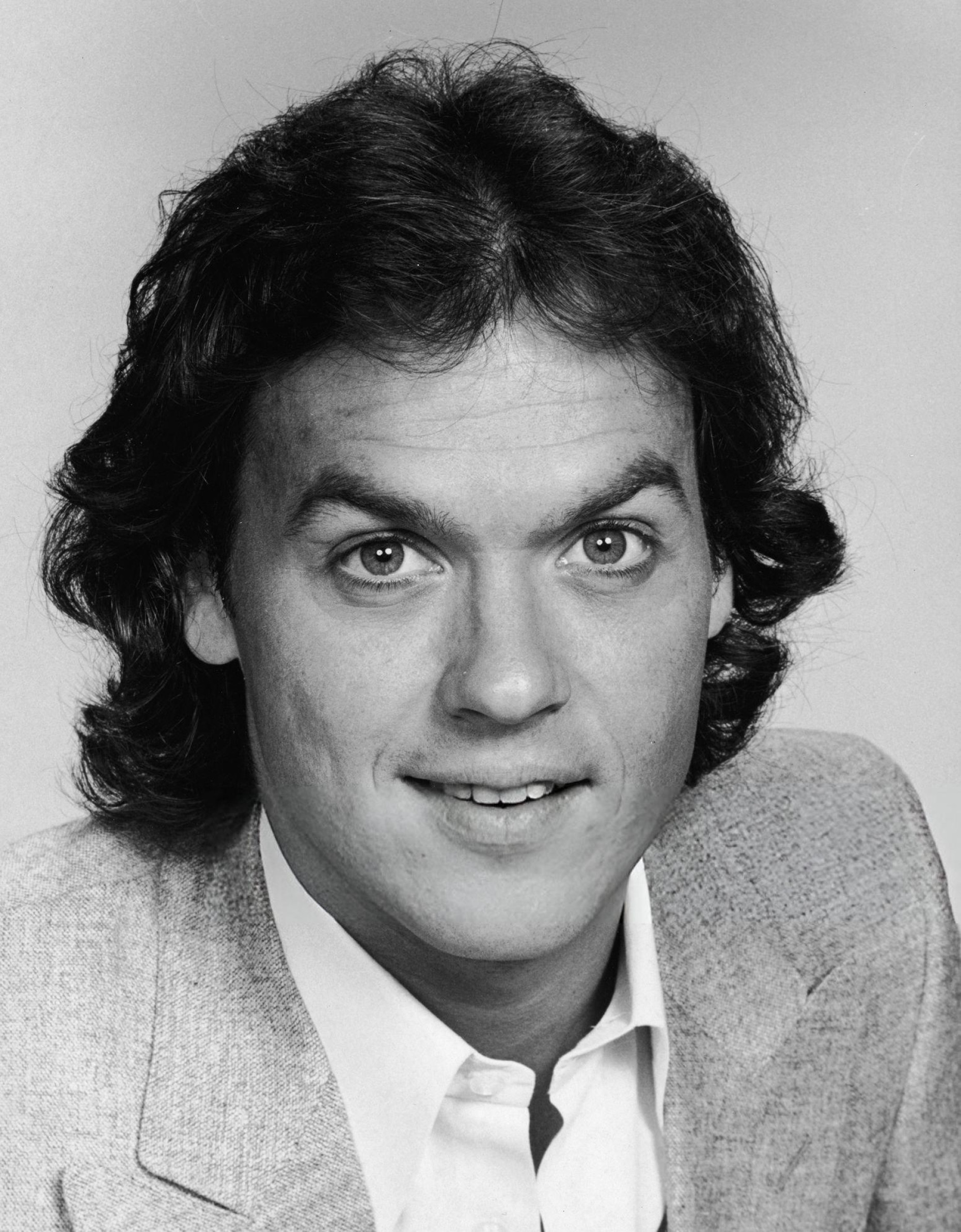
Keaton as Mike O'Rourke on Working Stiffs, 1979

Keaton's film debut came in a small non-speaking role in the Joan Rivers film Rabbit Test (1978). His next big break was working alongside Jim Belushi in the short-lived comedy series Working Stiffs, which showcased his comedic talent and led to a co-starring role in the comedy Night Shift (1982) directed by Ron Howard. This was his breakout role as the fast-talking schemer Bill "Billy Blaze" Blazejowski and earned Keaton some critical acclaim.

Night Shift led to Keaton becoming a leading man in the 1983 comedy hit Mr. Mom. Keaton was pigeonholed as a comic lead during this time with films like Johnny Dangerously (1984), Gung Ho (1986), The Squeeze (1987), and The Dream Team (1989), though Keaton tried to transition to dramatic leads as early as 1984, playing a hockey player in Touch and Go, which was shelved until 1986. Woody Allen cast Keaton as the lead in The Purple Rose of Cairo the following year, but after filming began Allen felt Keaton was "too modern" and reshot his scenes with Jeff Daniels in the final film, further delaying his transition to drama in the public eye. When Touch and Go was finally released in 1986 the studio was still unsure of how to market the film, making the poster, trailer and TV spots similar to Mr. Mom, which resulted in the film not finding its target audience.

1988 was a seminal year in Keaton's career, in which he landed two major unconventional roles, forever changing his image to audiences. He played the title character in Tim Burton's horror-comedy Beetlejuice, earning Keaton widespread acclaim and boosting him to Hollywood's A list. That same year, he also gave an acclaimed dramatic performance as a drug-addicted realtor in Glenn Gordon Caron's Clean and Sober.

=== 1989–1999: Established actor ===
Keaton's career gained further momentum when Tim Burton cast him in the title role of the 1989 film Batman. Warner Bros. received thousands of written complaints from fans who believed Keaton was the wrong choice to portray Batman. However, Keaton's performance in the role ultimately earned widespread acclaim from both critics and audiences, and Batman became one of 1989's most successful films.

According to Les Daniels's reference book Batman: The Complete History, Keaton initially believed the film would be similar in tone to the 1960s TV series starring Adam West. However, after reading Frank Miller's comic book miniseries The Dark Knight Returns, he understood the darker, more brooding side of Batman that Burton's adaptation was going for, which he portrayed to much fan approval. Keaton later reprised the role for the sequel Batman Returns (1992), which was another critically acclaimed success. He was initially set to reprise the role again for a third Batman film, even going as far as to show up for costume fitting. However, when Burton was dropped as director of the film, Keaton left the franchise as well. He was reportedly dissatisfied with the screenplay approved by the new director, Joel Schumacher. According to the A&E Biography episode on Keaton, after he had refused the first time (after meetings with Schumacher), Warner Bros. offered him $15 million, but Keaton steadfastly refused and was replaced by Val Kilmer in Batman Forever (1995).

Keaton remained active during the 1990s, appearing in a wide range of films, including Pacific Heights (1990), One Good Cop (1991), My Life (1993) and the star-studded Shakespearean story Much Ado About Nothing (1993). He starred in The Paper (1994) and Multiplicity (1996), and twice in the same role, that of Elmore Leonard character Agent Ray Nicolette, in the films Jackie Brown (1997) and Out of Sight (1998). He made the family holiday movie Jack Frost (1998) and the thriller Desperate Measures (1998). Keaton starred as a political candidate's speechwriter in 1994's Speechless.

=== 2000–2013: Limited roles and venture into voice acting ===
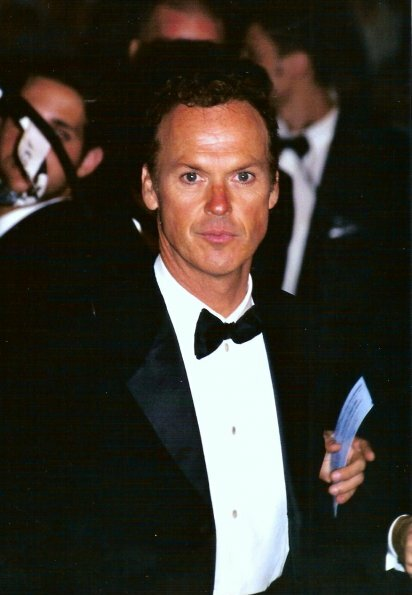
Keaton attending the 2002 Cannes Film Festival

In the early 2000s, Keaton appeared in several films with mixed success, including Live From Baghdad (2002, for which he was nominated for a Golden Globe award), First Daughter (2004, playing the President of the United States), White Noise (2005) and Herbie: Fully Loaded (2005). While he continued to receive good notices from the critics (particularly for Jackie Brown), he was not able to re-approach the box-office success of Batman until the release of Disney/Pixar's Cars (2006), in which he voiced Chick Hicks, a green race car with a mustache, who frequently loses his patience with losing to his longtime rival, Strip Weathers, a.k.a. The King, voiced by Richard Petty.

On New Year's Day of 2004, he hosted the PBS television special Mr. Rogers: America's Favorite Neighbor. It was released by Triumph Marketing LLC on DVD September 28, 2004. In 2006, he starred in Game 6, about the 1986 World Series bid by the Boston Red Sox. He had a cameo in the Tenacious D short film Time Fixers, an iTunes exclusive. The 9-minute film was released to coincide with Tenacious D in The Pick of Destiny. Keaton reportedly was cast as Jack Shephard in the series Lost, with the understanding that the role of Jack would be a brief one. Once the role was retooled to be a long-running series regular, Keaton withdrew. The part was then given to actor Matthew Fox. The show ran for six seasons, with the Shephard role continuing throughout.

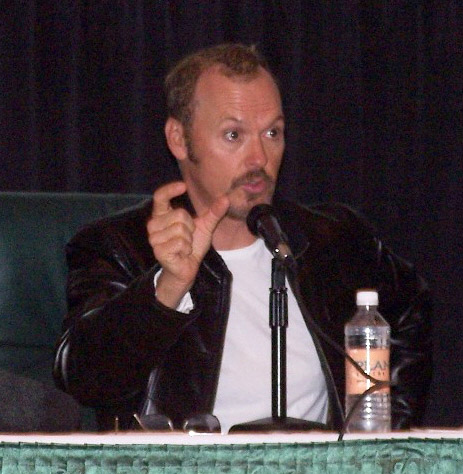
Keaton at the 2004 Dallas Comic Con promoting White Noise

Keaton starred in the 2007 television miniseries The Company, set during the Cold War, in which he portrayed the real-life CIA counterintelligence chief James Jesus Angleton. The role garnered Keaton a 2008 Screen Actors Guild nomination for Outstanding Performance by a Male Actor in a Television Movie or Miniseries. Keaton provided the voice of Ken in Toy Story 3 (2010). The film received overwhelmingly positive acclaim and grossed over $1 billion worldwide, making it one of the most financially successful films ever. He played Captain Gene Mauch in the comedy The Other Guys (2010).

=== 2014–2019: Renewed critical success ===
In 2014 he played the OmniCorp CEO Raymond Sellars in the RoboCop remake as a more active antagonist, taking RoboCop's wife and child hostage, forcing Joel Kinnaman's character to struggle to overcome the 4th directive.

Keaton starred alongside Zach Galifianakis, Edward Norton, Emma Stone, and Naomi Watts in Alejandro González Iñárritu's Birdman or (The Unexpected Virtue of Ignorance) (2014), playing Riggan Thomson, a screen actor, famous for playing the titular superhero, who puts on a Broadway play based on a Raymond Carver short story to regain his former glory. He won the Golden Globe Award for Best Actor in a Musical or Comedy for his portrayal of Thomson and received an Academy Award nomination for Best Actor. In 2015, Keaton appeared as Walter V. Robinson in Tom McCarthy's Academy Award-winning film Spotlight, and in 2016, he starred as businessman Ray Kroc in the biopic The Founder. On July 28, 2016, Keaton was honored with the 2,585th star on the Hollywood Walk of Fame for his contributions to film. The star is located at 6931 Hollywood Blvd. In 2017, Keaton played the supervillain the Vulture in Spider-Man: Homecoming. While making this film Keaton was unable to reprise the role of Chick Hicks for Disney and Pixar's Cars 3 and was replaced by Bob Peterson. Later that year, Keaton portrayed Stan Hurley in American Assassin.

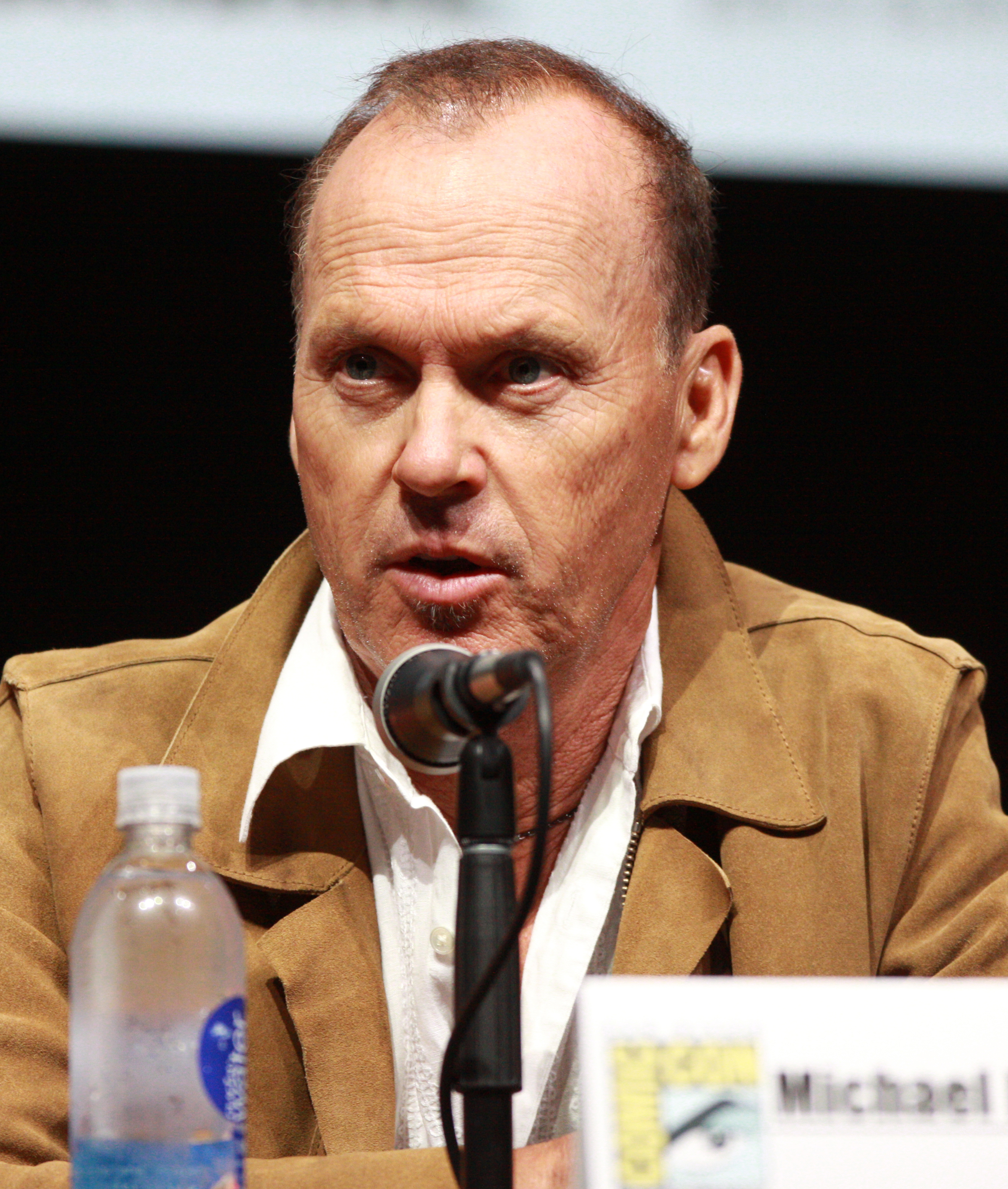
Keaton at the 2013 San Diego Comic Con

In 2019, he played the villain in Disney's live-action adaptation of Dumbo directed by Tim Burton, co-starring with Colin Farrell and Eva Green. Keaton later said: "I was clueless on Dumbo. I sucked in Dumbo."

=== 2020–present: Continued acclaim and reprising past roles ===
In 2020, Keaton appeared in a small role as U.S. Attorney General Ramsey Clark in The Trial of the Chicago 7, a legal drama directed by Aaron Sorkin about seven anti-Vietnam protesters charged with inciting riots in 1968.

In 2021, Keaton starred as American lawyer Kenneth Feinberg in the Netflix biographical drama film Worth. He then starred in the Hulu miniseries Dopesick. He won the Screen Actors Guild Award for Outstanding Performance by a Male Actor in a Miniseries or Television Movie and Primetime Emmy Award for Outstanding Lead Actor in a Limited or Anthology Series or Movie for his role. Keaton cites his performance in 1988's Clean and Sober as an early preparation for Dopesick. In 2022, he briefly reprised his role as Vulture in the Sony's Spider-Man Universe (SSU) film Morbius, which released on April 1, 2022.

In 2023, Keaton reprised his role as Batman/Bruce Wayne, after last playing the role in 1992, in the DC Extended Universe superhero film The Flash. He filmed scenes to reprise the character in Batgirl starring Leslie Grace, set for a release on HBO Max, taking some inspiration from the acclaimed DC Animated Universe animated series Batman Beyond with Keaton playing the elder Bruce Wayne as the title character's mentor and remote coordinator in the Batcave, only for the film's release to be cancelled in August 2022. Keaton stated that he did not care about that decision because he had made money making the film, though he said he felt badly for the film's directors. He also reprised the character in the 2023 film Aquaman and the Lost Kingdom, in an ultimately deleted scene. Keaton also starred in and directed the 2023 noir thriller Knox Goes Away.

In 2024, Keaton reprised his role as Beetlejuice for Beetlejuice Beetlejuice. Keaton next starred in Goodrich, a film about a man whose second wife suddenly leaves him, forcing him to take sole care of their nine-year-old twins. Directed by Hallie Meyers-Shyer, filming was set to commence in October 2019, but after a delay ultimately began in April 2023.

On April 16, 2025, it was reported that Keaton would be joining the cast of the Netflix and AGBO adaptation of the Alex North novel The Whisper Man. On September 1, 2026, it was announced that Keaton would star alongside actor Morgan Freeman, as well as direct the Western film Road to Ruin.

== Personal life ==
=== Marriage and family ===
Keaton was married to Caroline McWilliams from 1982 to 1990. They have a son, Sean, born in 1983. Through their son, Keaton and McWilliams have two grandchildren. Keaton had a relationship with actress Courteney Cox from 1990 to 1995. He has been in a relationship with Marni Turner since 2016.

=== Interests ===
Keaton, a longtime Pittsburgh resident and fan of its sports teams, negotiated a break in his Batman movie contract in case the Pittsburgh Pirates made the playoffs that year, although they ultimately did not. Keaton did, however, take time off from filming the sequel Batman Returns in order to return to Pittsburgh to support the Pittsburgh Penguins in the 1991 Stanley Cup Finals. Keaton has been seen regularly at Penguins home playoff games. Keaton also often attends Pittsburgh Steelers games and, during the 2005 AFC Championship Game, he wandered onto the camera frame of the KDKA pregame coverage, surprising reporter John Steigerwald. He also wrote an ESPN blog on the Pirates during the final months of their 2013 season.

In the 1980s, Keaton bought a ranch near Big Timber, Montana, where he spends much of his time. An avid fisherman, he is often seen on the saltwater fishing series Buccaneers & Bones on Outdoor Channel, along with Tom Brokaw, Zach Gilford, Thomas McGuane, and Yvon Chouinard, among others.

=== Political views and activism ===
Keaton supported Barack Obama in 2008, Hillary Clinton for president in the 2016 U.S. presidential election, and Joe Biden in the 2020 U.S. presidential election. Despite his political activism during the 2020 election, Keaton later stated that celebrities should not speak about politics. In addition, Keaton has said that he tries to be judicious in choosing when to become involved in politics, as his fame can be detrimental.

In 2019, he appeared in a PETA ad campaign, asking tourists not to visit operations that exploit animals, such as roadside zoos which sometimes offer the opportunity to get selfies with wild animals.

== Filmography ==
Key
†	Denotes works that have not yet been released

=== Film ===
Year	Title	Role	Notes
1978	Rabbit Test	Sailor	
1978	A Different Approach	Filmmaker	Short film
1982	Night Shift	Bill Blazejowski	
1983	Mr. Mom	Jack Butler	
1984	Johnny Dangerously	Johnny Kelly / Johnny Dangerously	
1986	Gung Ho	Hunt Stevenson	
1986	Touch and Go	Bobby Barbato	
1987	The Squeeze	Harry Berg	
1988	She's Having a Baby	Himself	Uncredited cameo appearance
1988	Beetlejuice	Betelgeuse	
1988	Clean and Sober	Daryl Poynter	
1989	The Dream Team	Billy Caufield	
1989	Batman	Bruce Wayne / Batman	
1990	Pacific Heights	Carter Hayes / James Danforth	
1991	One Good Cop	Detective Artie Lewis	
1992	Batman Returns	Bruce Wayne / Batman	
1993	Much Ado About Nothing	Dogberry	
1993	My Life	Bob Ivanovich / Jones	
1994	The Paper	Henry Hackett	
1994	Speechless	Kevin Vallick	
1996	Multiplicity	Doug Kinney/Lance/Rico/Lenny	
1997	Inventing the Abbotts	Narrator / Older Doug Holt	Uncredited
1997	Jackie Brown	ATF Agent Ray Nicolette	
1998	Desperate Measures	Peter J. McCabe	
1998	Out of Sight	Ray Nicolette	Uncredited
1998	Jack Frost	Jack Frost	Also voice of snowman form
1999	Body Shots	—N/a	Executive producer only
2002	A Shot at Glory	Peter Cameron	
2004	Quicksand	Martin Raikes	
2004	First Daughter	President John MacKenzie	
2005	White Noise	Jonathan Rivers	
2005	Porco Rosso	Porco Rosso	Voice, English dub
2005	Herbie: Fully Loaded	Ray Peyton	
2006	Game 6	Nicky Rogan	
2006	Cars	Chick Hicks	Voice
2007	The Last Time	Ted Riker	Also executive producer
2008	The Merry Gentleman	Frank Logan	Also director
2009	Post Grad	Walter Malby	
2010	Toy Story 3	Ken	Voice
2010	The Other Guys	Captain Gene Mauch	
2011	Hawaiian Vacation	Ken	Voice; Short film
2012	Noah's Ark: The New Beginning	Noah	Voice; Unreleased
2013	Penthouse North	Hollander	Also executive producer; Also known as Blindsided
2014	RoboCop	Raymond Sellars	
2014	Need for Speed	"Monarch"	
2014	Birdman (or The Unexpected Virtue of Ignorance)	Riggan Thomson / Birdman	
2015	Minions	Walter Nelson	Voice
2015	Spotlight	Walter 'Robby' Robinson	
2016	The Founder	Ray Kroc	
2017	Spider-Man: Homecoming	Adrian Toomes / Vulture	
2017	American Assassin	CIA Agent Stan Hurley	
2019	Dumbo	V. A. Vandevere	
2020	The Trial of the Chicago 7	Ramsey Clark	
2021	Worth	Kenneth Feinberg	
2021	The Protégé	Rembrandt	
2022	Morbius	Adrian Toomes / Vulture	Cameo
2023	The Flash	Bruce Wayne / Batman	
2023	Knox Goes Away	John Knox	Also director and producer
2024	Clemente	Self	Documentary
2024	Beetlejuice Beetlejuice	Betelgeuse	
2024	Goodrich	Andy Goodrich	
2025	Sweetwater	Robert Rogers	Short film, also director
2026	The Whisper Man	Frank Carter	
TBA	Rode to Ruin †	Henry Tillman	Also director and producer

=== Television ===
Year	Title	Role	Notes
1975	Mister Rogers' Neighborhood	Volunteer	Episode #1435; also production assistant
1976–1977	All's Fair	Lannie Wolf	5 episodes
1977	Klein Time	Various characters	Television special
1977	Mary Hartman, Mary Hartman	The Robber	Episode: "2.89"
1977	Maude	Chip Winston	Episode: "Arthur's Crisis"
1978	The Tony Randall Show	Zeke	2 episodes
1978	Mary	Various roles	3 episodes
1978	Family	Tree salesman	Episode: "Gifts"
1979	Working Stiffs	Mike O'Rourke	9 episodes
1979	The Mary Tyler Moore Hour	Kenneth Christy	11 episodes
1982	Report to Murphy	Murphy	6 episodes
1982	Kraft Salutes Walt Disney World's 10th Anniversary	Kevin	Television special
1982–2024	Saturday Night Live	Himself (host) / Julian Assange	Host, 4 episodes; guest, episode: "Emma Stone/BTS"
1990	The Earth Day Special	Charles McIntyre	Television special
2001, 2025	The Simpsons	Jack Crowley / Hal Julian	Voice; Episodes: "Pokey Mom" and "Treehouse of Horror XXXVI"
2002	Frasier	Blaine Sternin	Episode: "Wheels of Fortune"
2002	Live from Baghdad	Robert Wiener	Television film
2003	King of the Hill	Trip Larsen	Voice; Episode: "Pigmalion"
2003	Gary the Rat	Jerry Andrews	Voice; Episode: "Catch Me If You Can"
2003	Fred Rogers: America's Favorite Neighbor	Himself	Host; Television special
2007	The Company	James Angleton	3 episodes
2011	30 Rock	Tom	Episode: "100"
2013	Clear History	Joe Stumpo	Television film
2018	Mister Rogers: It's You I Like	Himself	Host; Television special
2019	Documentary Now!	Bill Doss	Episode: "Batsh*t Valley"
2019	Last Week Tonight with John Oliver	Richard Sackler	Episode: "Opioids II"
2021	Dopesick	Samuel Finnix	Miniseries
2025	The American Revolution	Benedict Arnold	Voice; 2 episodes
2026	Who Wants to Be a Millionaire	Himself	Episode: "In the Hot Seat: Michael Keaton & Jon Lovett / Will Forte & Taran Killam" (505)
TBA	The Studio †	TBA	

=== Video games ===
Year	Title	Role	Notes
2006	Cars	Chick Hicks	
2009	Cars Race-O-Rama	Chick Hicks	
2012	Call of Duty: Black Ops II	Jason Hudson	Replaced Ed Harris

== Awards and nominations ==
Over his career Keaton has received several awards including a Primetime Emmy Award, two Golden Globe Awards, six Critics Choice Movie Awards, and four Screen Actors Guild Awards as well as nominations for an Academy Award and British Academy Film Award. Keaton was honored with a Career Achievement Award from the Hollywood Film Festival. He is also a visiting scholar at Carnegie Mellon University. Keaton was Harvard's 2026 Hasty Pudding Man of the Year and accepted the award in February 2026.
