= September 11th Victim Compensation Fund =

Fund after September 11, 2001 attacks

The September 11th Victim Compensation Fund, commonly known as the VCF, is a U.S. government fund that was created by an Act of Congress shortly after the September 11 attacks in 2001. The purpose of the fund was to compensate the victims of the attacks and their families with the quid pro quo of their agreement not to file lawsuits against the airline corporations involved, such as American Airlines and United Airlines. The VCF functions similar to the Social Security Administration, in that part of the annual U.S. federal budget is set aside for the specific purpose of paying out victims, although this process is heavily regulated. Medical treatments for several respiratory diseases, including asthma and sleep apnea, as well as for all forms of cancer, are covered by the VCF.

Kenneth Feinberg was appointed by Attorney General John Ashcroft to be special master of the fund. He developed the regulations governing the administration of the fund and administered all aspects of the program. Legislation authorizes the fund to disburse a maximum of $7.375 billion, including operational and administrative costs, of U.S. government funds.

== Establishment and procedures ==
The September 11th Victim Compensation Fund was formally established by an Act of Congress in the Air Transportation Safety and System Stabilization Act (49 USC 40101).

Feinberg was responsible for making the decisions on how much each family of a victim would receive. Feinberg had to estimate how much each victim would have earned in a full lifetime. If a family accepted the offer, it was not possible to appeal. Families unhappy with the offer were able to appeal in a nonadversarial, informal hearing to present their case however they wanted. Feinberg personally presided over more than 900 of the 1,600 hearings. At the end of the process $7 billion was awarded to 97% of the families. A non-negotiable clause in the acceptance papers for the settlements was that the families were to never file suit against the airlines for any lack of security or otherwise unsafe procedures.

A stumbling block to settlements was that many of the World Trade Center victims were highly compensated financial professionals. Families of these victims felt the compensation offers were too low, and, had a court considered their case on an individual basis, they would have been awarded much higher amounts. This concern had to be balanced against the time, complications, and risks of pursuing an individual case, and the real possibility that the airlines and their insurers could be bankrupted before being able to pay the claim.

This is a separate fund from the similarly named September 11th Fund, and from the World Trade Center Captive Insurance Company.

== The eight-part Feinberg plan ==
In his book titled What is Life Worth?, Feinberg described the eight-part plan which was applied to approaching the September 11th Victim Compensation Fund (see Publications section below).

(i) Identify someone with sufficient experience in mass tort action mediation, litigation, and settlement, which Feinberg possessed through his previous personal experience as a political activist and his work in the Agent Orange compensation settlement.

(ii) To support and follow the unprecedented law of Congress for the proportional compensation of victims based on estimated loss from future earnings as a key legislated criterion. Hire a full staff of accountants and attorneys to track and service each claim individually.

(iii) Accumulate all the reports and applications, along with counter-claims to gauge and initiate the direct compensation process. How the compensation fund worked was in detail substantially different from the Agent Orange mass tort litigation case.

(iv) The place of informed discretion in compensating claimants under the formula of keeping the domain of compensation (p47 of Feinberg's book) under the rule of thumb that 85% of the money should not go to 15% of the 'richest' claimant families, under the principle of "narrow the gap" between the largest and the smallest compensations paid to claimants.

(v) With a mind to the future, the process of the program should be maintained and serviced as a precedent for future courts to defend in future compensation cases as needed. The actions taken should be uniform in their approach.

(vi) There would be "no substitute for hard work and legal craftsmanship" of rigorous intellectual honesty.

(vii) The support of Edward Kennedy would be recognized throughout the process whom Feinberg knew since 1975 (p7-8).

(viii) Lawsuits were to be discouraged as contrary to the spirit of an enacted Law of Congress legislated to expedite the claim process of victims of September 11th.

== Additional compensation ==
Despite the disputed claim of the 9/11 Commission Report that the Saudi Arabian government was not involved in the attacks, some 9/11 families sued the Saudi Arabian government in 2016 seeking additional restitution. The lawsuit accuses the Saudis of wrongful death.

In February 2022, the Biden administration allowed $3.5 billion of $7bn of frozen Afghanistan state assets to be used by the victims of the 9/11 attacks. However, in February 2023 ruling, US District Judge George Daniels decided that the money could not be used for them, as it would recognize the Taliban, defendants in the suit, as the legitimate government of Afghanistan.

== In popular culture ==
- Worth (2020 film) depicts Feinberg's handling of the September 11th Victim Compensation Fund.

== See also ==
- Financial assistance following the September 11 attacks

== Publications ==
- Feinberg, Kenneth (June 2012). Who Gets What: Fair Compensation after Tragedy and Financial Upheaval. New York City: PublicAffairs. ISBN 9781586489779.
- Feinberg, Kenneth (2005). What is Life Worth?: The Unprecedented Effort to Compensate the Victims of 9/11. Perseus Books Group. ISBN 9781586484514.
