= National Network for Safe Communities =

US research center

- Abbreviation: NNSC
- Headquarters: New York, NY
- Director: David M. Kennedy
- Website: https://nnscommunities.org/

The National Network for Safe Communities (NNSC) is a research center at City University of New York John Jay College of Criminal Justice. The NNSC works with communities to reduce violence, minimize arrest and incarceration, and increase trust between law enforcement and the public. Working in partnership with cities around the country the NNSC provides advising on implementing evidence-based violence reduction strategies. Additionally, the NNSC provides guidance on how to build trust between law enforcement and the communities it serves, facilitates connections between practitioners within and across jurisdictions, and serves as a resource for knowledge about violence prevention and reduction strategies.

== History ==
The National Network for Safe Communities was founded as the Center for Crime Prevention and Control in 2005. In 2009 it was re-launched as the National Network for Safe Communities under the direction of David M. Kennedy and John Jay College President Jeremy Travis.

The National Network's efforts are an outgrowth of the success of Operation Ceasefire, a Boston-based youth homicide intervention led by David M. Kennedy in the 1990s. Operation Ceasefire was responsible for a 63 percent reduction in youth homicide victimization and is now implemented in dozens of cities as the NNSC's Group Violence Intervention (GVI). The NNSC has used GVI's framework to develop strategies to address overt drug markets, intimate partner violence, prison violence, and individual gun violence. In 2014 the U.S. Department of Justice awarded a three-year $4.75 Million grant to create the National Initiative for Building Community Trust and Justice (NI), and named the National Network as the lead organization. In 2016 the NNSC partnered with the Manhattan District Attorney's Office to create the Institute for Innovation in Prosecution (IIP), which facilitates conversation among prosecutors across the nation. The NNSC has also begun to explore violence prevention work in an international context.

The work of the National Network has been widely recognized and has been awarded for its strategies. The NNSC was awarded the Ford Foundation’s Innovations in American Government Award twice (in 1997 & 2007), and received the Webber Seavey Award given by the International Association of Chiefs of Police (in 1999 & 2008) twice. The NNSC also won the Herman Goldstein International Award for Problem Oriented Policing twice (in 1998 &2016) and was selected as a finalist on two other occasions (in 2006 & 2009).

== Strategies ==
The NNSC uses focused deterrence and problem-oriented policing strategies to identify a particular serious crime problem and design a strategy to respond to it. The National Network’s process recognizes that a small minority of individuals drive the majority of serious violence, therefore law enforcement needs to employ a similarly concentrated response. The NNSC’s strategies rely on partnerships between law enforcement, community leaders, and social service providers to harness the power of social norms as a tool for crime prevention. The partnership then communicates directly and repeatedly with those individuals, giving them a moral message from the community against violence, the legal consequences of further offending, and an offer of help. Although the basic strategy doesn’t change, the NNSC works with cities to understand the context of violence in their communities and to design a site specific implementation plan.

=== Group Violence Intervention ===
The Group Violence Intervention (GVI) is designed to reduce street group-involved homicide and gun violence, and is an outgrowth of the work done by Operation Ceasefire in Boston in the 1990s. The aim of the GVI strategy is to reduce peer dynamics in the group that promote violence by creating collective accountability, to foster internal social pressure that deters violence, to establish clear community standards against violence, to offer group members an “honorable exit” from committing acts of violence, and to provide a supported path for those who want to change.

=== Drug Market Intervention ===
The Drug Market Intervention (DMI) effectively eliminates overt drug markets and improves life for residents of the surrounding communities. The DMI partnership brings together key stakeholders to make it clear that selling drugs openly must stop and the market is closed, that help is available, and that continued dealing will result in immediate sanctions through the activation of existing cases.

=== Intimate Partner Violence Intervention ===
The Intimate Partner Violence Intervention (IPVI) employs the National Network's approach to identify and deter the most serious domestic violence offenders, reduce domestic violence, and reduce harm to victims. Through a partnership between law enforcement, community members, social service providers, and domestic violence victims’ advocates, the IPVI strategy intervenes early with low-level domestic violence offenders, puts them on notice of community intolerance for domestic violence and that further and more serious offending will be met with a meaningful legal response, and takes special steps to remove the most dangerous domestic violence offenders from the community.

=== Prison Violence Intervention ===
The Prison Violence Intervention (PVI) aims to enhance safety and security in prisons for both staff and inmates. The strategy uses the National Network's process to identify the institution's key players and target serious prison offenses such as assaults against staff, multi-inmate fights, and assaults with weapons.

== Projects ==
https://trustandjustice.org/

=== National Initiative for Building Community Trust and Justice ===
The National Initiative is a U.S. Department of Justice project led by the National Network for Safe Communities. The NNSC works alongside Yale Law School, the Center for Policing Equity, and the Urban Institute as principal partners. Launched in 2014, the National Initiative (NI) is designed to improve relationships and increase trust between minority communities and the criminal justice system. It seeks to enhance procedural justice, reduce bias (including implicit bias), and supports reconciliation between law enforcement and the communities it serves. The NI also aims to advance the public and scholarly understandings of the issues contributing to those relationships. The NI is currently working in Birmingham, Alabama; Ft. Worth, Texas; Gary, Indiana; Minneapolis, Minnesota; Pittsburgh, Pennsylvania; and Stockton, California.

https://nnscommunities.org/our-work/iip

=== Institute for Innovation in Prosecution ===
The Institute for Innovation in Prosecution (IIP) is a partnership between the NNSC and the Manhattan District Attorney’s Office. The IIP blends academic rigor and prosecutorial action to form a new generation of thought in the field. The institute uses executive sessions, strategic advising, practitioner learning, and research & evaluation to inform prosecutors and build a more effective criminal justice system. Ultimately, the IIP seeks to enhance trust, improve transparency, and increase safety.

== NNSC Results & Recognition ==
=== Individual Cities’ Results ===
- Boston: 63% reduction in youth homicide and 31% reduction in shootings involving gangs subject to Operation Ceasefire treatment (1996)
- Indianapolis: 34% reduction in homicide (1999)
- Stockton: 42% reduction in gun homicide (2002)
- Cincinnati: 41% reduction in group member involved homicide (2008)
- New Orleans: 32% decrease in group member involved homicides, a 17% decrease in overall homicide, and a 16% decrease in total firearm violence
- Chicago: 23% reduction in overall shooting behavior and a 32% reduction in gunshot victimization over the next year among factions that attended a call-in
- Nashville: 55% reduction in narcotics offenses
- Rockford: 22% reduction in non-violent offenses

=== Systematic Reviews ===
- Braga, A. A., & Weisburd, D. L. (2012). The Effects of 'Pulling Levers' Focused Deterrence Strategies on Crime. Campbell Systematic Reviews, 8.
- Wong, J., Gravel, J., Bouchard, M., Morselli, C., & Descormiers, K. (2011). Effectiveness of Street Gang Control Strategies: A Systematic Review and Meta-Analysis of Evaluation Studies. Canada: Prepared for the Department of Public Safety Canada.
- Weisburd, D., Farrington, D. P., & Gill, C. (2016). What Works in Crime Prevention and Rehabilitation: Lessons from Systematic Reviews. New York: Springer Publishing Co.
- Abt, T., & Winship, C. (2016). What Works in Reducing Community Violence: A Meta-Review and Field Study for the Northern Triangle. United States Agency for International Development.
