= David M. Kennedy (criminologist) =

American criminologist (born 1958)

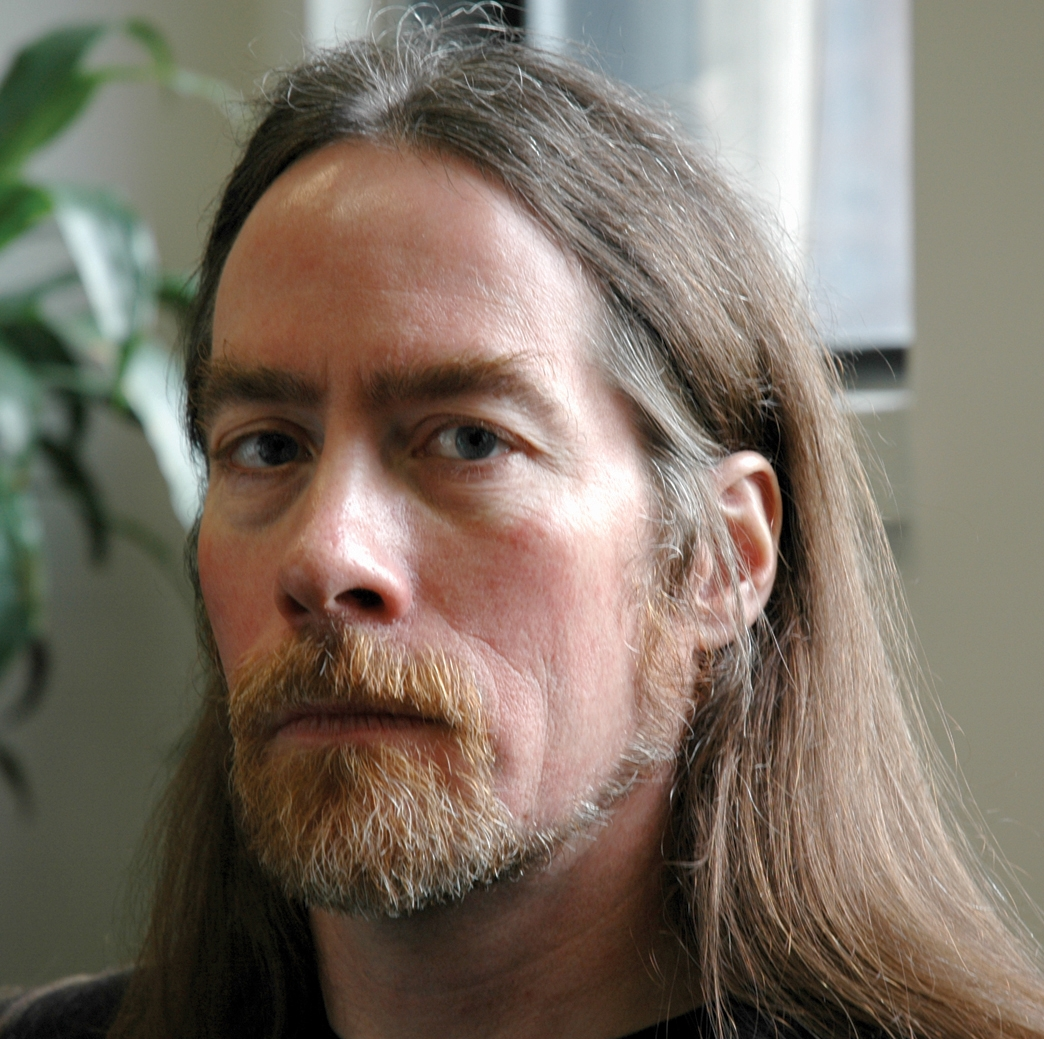
- Kennedy in 2011
- Born: 1958 (age 67–68)
- Education: Swarthmore College (BA)
- Occupations: Criminologist; professor; action researcher; author
- Known for: Operation Ceasefire

David M. Kennedy (born 1958) is an American criminologist, professor, action researcher, and author specializing in crime prevention among inner city gangs, especially in the prevention of violent acts among street gangs. Kennedy developed the Operation Ceasefire group violence intervention in Boston in the 1990s and the High Point Model drug market intervention in High Point, North Carolina, in 2003, which have proven to reduce violence and eliminate overt drug markets in jurisdictions around the United States. He founded the National Network for Safe Communities in 2009 to support cities using these and related strategies.

He is the author of two books, Don't Shoot: One Man, A Street Fellowship, and the End of Violence in Inner-City America (2011), a popular treatment of his violence reduction work with street gangs, and Deterrence and Crime Prevention: Reconsidering the Prospect of Sanction (2008), a theoretical publication. He is the coauthor of Beyond 911: A New Era for Policing, a book on community policing.

== Biography ==
=== Education ===
David M. Kennedy graduated from Swarthmore College in Swarthmore, Pennsylvania, in 1980 with a Bachelor of Arts and high honors in philosophy and history. In 2011, his alma mater awarded him the honorary degree of Doctor of Laws.

=== Career ===
During the 1980s Kennedy worked as a case writer in the Case Program of the John F. Kennedy School of Government at Harvard University, in Cambridge, Massachusetts. While visiting the Nickerson Gardens neighborhood of Los Angeles on an assignment, he became acutely aware of ravages of the crack epidemic and gang-related violence on poor communities of color in the United States. This initial experience inspired his lifelong commitment to combating these problems.

In the mid-1990s, as part of the Boston Gun Project, Kennedy and colleagues Anthony A. Braga and Anne M. Piehl from Harvard worked in Boston to apply new problem-oriented policing ideas to Boston's violence epidemic. Through working with the Boston Police Department gang unit, Kennedy and his colleagues came to understand that gangs were at the heart of the problem and that an extremely small number of highly active offenders was responsible for a majority of the city's serious crime problem, a principle that has informed his interventions ever since. Together with Boston law enforcement, city officials, community and faith leaders, and street outreach workers, Kennedy and his colleagues developed the “call-in,” a face-to-face meeting with gang members in a forum setting, during which this partnership of city stakeholders "clearly communicates (1) a credible, moral message against violence; (2) a credible law enforcement message about the group consequences of further violence; and (3) a genuine offer of help for those who want it." The immediate result of Operation Ceasefire was a 63 percent reduction in youth homicide and a 30 percent reduction in homicide citywide, what has been called the "Boston Miracle." The call-in and other forms of direct communication with active offenders remain the central features of the Group Violence Intervention and Kennedy's overall approach to reducing violence and community disorder. One important element of the call-in message is that it provides what Kennedy calls an "honorable exit" from violence and the street code that promotes it, "a way to step back without losing face."

After the initial success in Boston, Kennedy found stakeholders in Minneapolis willing to replicate his research and he led another successful implementation of the still developing strategy. Next, he assisted Stockton, California, and Baltimore, among other cities. The Baltimore intervention, begun in 1998, proved to be a particular challenge and highlighted some of the difficulties of implementation, especially in working with rival political officials and sustaining the strategy. After an initial decline in violence, the project faced political resistance and came to a halt.

In Baltimore, Kennedy also began to refine the terminology used within the strategy: Kennedy uses the term "group" rather than "gang" because all gangs are groups, but not all groups are gangs. His research has found that many high-rate offenders associate in groups - such as neighborhood cliques, sets, or drug crews - that do not fit the statutory definition of a gang or share such characteristics as a name, common symbols, signs or tags, an identifiable hierarchy, or other identifiers.

Using the principles developed in his previous research, Kennedy began to craft an approach to eliminating overt drug markets, a problem poisoning America's most troubled communities and driving violence. "It's not about the drugs," writes Kennedy, "it's about the drug market. Drug use doesn't cause much violence, much public chaos. It can be very bad...But the community can handle that. It's the street scene that tears the community apart." He theorized an approach to eliminating drug markets that would combine formal and informal social control, using call-ins to communicate an antidealing message from community leaders and a promise of swift, certain sanctions from law enforcement.

High Point, North Carolina, a city already using Kennedy's approach to reduce violence, was the first to pilot the new strategy for eliminating its overt drug markets. As in the Group Violence Intervention, Kennedy designed a strategy for High Point to focus on the core population driving the problem. High Point law enforcement arrested the small number of dangerous drug dealers, those with a history of violent offenses. Law enforcement built prosecutable cases on the dozen or so remaining dealers and "banked" the cases, or held them unless the dealer continued dealing. At call-ins, the banked case allowed law enforcement to put the dealer on notice that any known future dealing would result in immediate arrest and prosecution and community representatives communicated clear standards against overt dealing and violence. The Drug Market Intervention in High Point closed the city's overt markets with no sign of displacement. The city saw a 44 to 56 percent reduction in Part 1 Uniform Crime Reports data in three out of four neighborhoods that implemented the strategy and a four to 74 percent reduction in drug offenses in all four neighborhoods. The strategy has now been widely and successfully replicated throughout the U.S.

Within the Drug Market Intervention, Kennedy also developed the concept of "racial reconciliation" necessary to heal relations between law enforcement and communities of color before their collaborative work could proceed. "The real issue was the way the relationship between the police and community was being poisoned by toxic racial narrative,” Kennedy has written. In his work, Kennedy points out that law enforcement and communities have fundamental misunderstandings about one another. He notes that many in communities of color, especially poor black communities, have experienced state-sanctioned police oppression within living memory, and that they believe current enforcement practices such as street stops, drug arrests, and mass incarceration to be a deliberate conspiracy against black communities and an extension of this history. Law enforcement, on the other hand, does not hear the community objecting to violence and drug markets and often believes that the community likes what's going on, is living off drug money, has lost its morality, or does not care enough to work for change. While both viewpoints are incorrect, says Kennedy, they make collaboration impossible. However, Kennedy believes that law enforcement and communities share important aims and common ground and that when they can meet and both acknowledge past harms and the ineffectiveness of their current positions, they can make progress toward eliminating not only violence and overt drug markets, but intrusive and damaging law enforcement practices, as well. High Point was the first site of formalized meetings to put the racial reconciliation process into practice and these powerful meetings laid the groundwork for the effective intervention.

The process of racial reconciliation was also the subject of a national U.S. Department of Justice working session in 2012 and has been a topic of increasing interest for communities and law enforcement agencies nationwide.

Kennedy currently directs a research center at the John Jay College of Criminal Justice in New York City, a position he has held since 2005. In 2009, Kennedy and John Jay College President Jeremy Travis founded the National Network for Safe Communities to link cities using Kennedy's strategies to reduce violence, minimize arrest and incarceration, improve legitimacy, and strengthen relationships between law enforcement and distressed communities. Through the National Network for Safe Communities, Kennedy is currently assisting numerous cities to implement the Group Violence Intervention, including Chicago, IL; Detroit, MI; Baltimore, MD; New Orleans, LA; Baton Rouge, LA; South Bend, IN; Chattanooga, TN; and three cities in the state of Connecticut. Kennedy also remains a professor of criminal justice in the Criminal Justice Department of John Jay College.

Kennedy and his work have been profiled in New Yorker, National Public Radio, 60 Minutes, and the Dylan Ratigan Show.

His distinctions include receiving two Webber Seavey awards from the International Association of Chiefs of Police, two Innovations in American Government awards from the Kennedy School of Government, and a Herman Goldstein Problem-Oriented Policing Award. Over his years of practice, Kennedy has influenced the approaches to drug enforcement by the administrations of presidents Bill Clinton and George W. Bush. He has spoken to many organizations, including the United States Congress, Scotland Yard, the National District Attorneys' Association, and the United States Conference of Mayors.

=== Personal life ===
Kennedy lives in Brooklyn, New York.

== Author ==
=== Don't Shoot: One Man, a Street Fellowship, and the End of Violence in Inner-City America ===
Published 2011, Kennedy's Don't Shoot: One Man, a Street Fellowship, and the End of Violence in Inner-City America describes the development of Operation Ceasefire, also commonly known as the Group Violence Intervention, which he and colleagues introduced in Boston, Massachusetts to combat gang-related violence in poor, predominantly black neighborhoods.

The program has three components. Recognized gang members would be brought in under probation or parole authority, and given an opportunity to listen to concerned members of their own community express their desire for the violence to stop. Social workers would offer services to help them detach from the cycle of violence, and the police would assure them that each gang that continued to engage in violence, starting with the most violent, would be effectively targeted and removed from the streets. They were asked to relay this threefold message to their fellow gang members. Recognizing that the gang members were arming themselves because of the escalating violence and the fears they had for their safety, the police pledged to react strongly to any threats against those cooperating with the effort.

The success of the program has been acknowledged. Kennedy's principles are being applied in other cities suffering from highly violent gang activity among their youngsters. Other cities are studying the program and devising ways to implement it in their communities.

The book has been reviewed in The New Republic, where it was characterized as a "page-turner" despite being an essentially academic publication.

=== Deterrence and Crime Prevention: Reconsidering the Prospect of Sanction ===
Published in 2008, Kennedy's Deterrence and Crime Prevention: Reconsidering the Prospect of Sanction is a theoretical work that provides an overview of deterrence approaches to preventing crime and forwards a new deterrence framework based on Kennedy's work reducing gang violence and eliminating overt drug markets. On traditional deterrence models, Kennedy writes, "Deterrence is at the heart of the preventive aspiration of criminal justice. Deterrence, whether through preventive patrol by police officers or stiff prison sentences for violent offenders, is the principal mechanism through which the central feature of criminal justice, the exercise of state authority, works -- it is hoped -- to diminish offending and enhance public safety. And however well we think deterrence works, it clearly often does not work nearly as well as we would like – and often at very great cost."

Kennedy identifies that a small number of high rate offenders commit the vast majority of serious crime in a community and theorizes a new framework for deterrence, through which law enforcement and community leaders engage directly with these offenders to deliver particular deterrence messages to them. Law enforcement is to give the offenders clear information about sanctions and put them on prior notice that specific criminal acts will be met in the future with special law enforcement attention. Community members deliver a credible moral message to the offenders that the community demands an end to the specific criminal act. Kennedy argues that groups rather than individuals should often be the focus of deterrence messaging. This new framework for deterrence, Kennedy argues, will reduce offending by enhancing both formal legal sanctions and informal social control. The book summarizes its arguments as follows:

- many of the ways in which we seek to deter crime in fact facilitate offending;
- simple steps such as providing clear information to offenders could transform deterrence;
- communities may be far more effective than legal authorities in deterring crime;
- apparently minor sanctions can deter more effectively than draconian ones;
- groups, rather than individual offenders, should often be the focus of deterrence;
- existing legal tools can be used in unusual but greatly more effective ways;
- even serious offenders can be reached through deliberate moral engagement;
- authorities, communities, and offenders - no matter how divided - share and can occupy hidden common ground.

The book gives the example of High Point, North Carolina, a city in which this deterrence framework successfully reduced gang-related violence and eliminated overt drug markets. Kennedy further theorizes that this framework has potential to deter the most serious domestic violence offending.

== Awards ==
David M. Kennedy received the 2011 Hatfield Scholar Award for scholarship in the public interest.

Kennedy's work has won the following awards and notable commendations:

- Ford Foundation’s Innovation in Government award program (twice)
- Webber Seavey Award from the International Association of Chiefs of Police (twice)
- Herman Goldstein International Award for Problem-Oriented Policing: first in 1998 for Operation Ceasefire, then again in 2009 for the Intimate Partner Violence Intervention in High Point, North Carolina
- Person of the Year Award from Law Enforcement News
- Chief's Award, High Point Police Department, High Point, North Carolina
- Director's Commendation, Bureau of Alcohol, Tobacco, and Firearms
- Letter of appreciation, Secretary of the Treasury Lawrence Summers
- Statement of thanks, Vice President Al Gore, launch of the Youth Crime Gun Interdiction Initiative

== See also ==
- Operation Ceasefire or the Boston Gun Project, based on Kennedy's work.
- Broken windows theory, which Kennedy has critiqued as alienating to the communities targeted by it, albeit effective at crime reduction.
- Stop-and-frisk in New York City, which Kennedy has critiqued as an overly broad method of enforcement and as ultimately irrelevant to the work of reducing violence.
