= Operation Ceasefire =

Massachusetts problem-oriented policing initiative

Operation Ceasefire (also known as the Boston Gun Project and the Boston Miracle) is a problem-oriented policing initiative implemented in 1996 in Boston, Massachusetts. The program was specifically aimed at youth gun violence as a large-scale problem. The plan is based on the work of criminologist David M. Kennedy.

== Boston ==
Through the late 1980s and early 1990s, Boston, like many cities in the United States, experienced an epidemic of youth gun homicides. Violence was particularly concentrated in poor inner city neighborhoods including Roxbury, Dorchester, and Mattapan. Youth homicide (ages 24 and under) in Boston increased 230% - from 22 victims in 1987 to 73 in 1990. Between 1991 and 1995, Boston averaged about 44 youth homicides a year. Operation Ceasefire entailed a problem-oriented policing approach, and focused on specific places that were crime hot spots. Focus was placed on two elements of the gun violence problem: illicit gun trafficking and gang violence.

At the outset, the strategy was sponsored by the National Institute of Justice and was co-directed by David M. Kennedy, Anthony A. Braga, and Anne M. Piehl of Harvard University's John F. Kennedy School of Government. The project, over the course of time, became unique, as it:

- Assembled a multi- and interagency working group composed largely of line-level criminal justice practitioners & Boston's Streetworker Program;
- Applied qualitative and quantitative research techniques;
- Created an assessment of the nature of and dynamics driving youth violence in Boston;
- Adapted the intervention after implementation, and continued to do so throughout the program; and
- Evaluated the intervention's impact.

A core participating agency was defined as one that regularly participated in the Boston Gun Project Working Group over the duration of the project. The participating core agencies included the Boston Police Department; Massachusetts departments of probation and parole; the Suffolk County district attorney; the office of the United States Attorney; the Bureau of Alcohol, Tobacco, and Firearms; the Massachusetts Department of Youth Services (juvenile corrections); Boston school police; and gang outreach and prevention streetworkers attached to the Boston Community center program. Other important partners with more intermittent participation include the Ten Points Coalition, the Office of the Massachusetts Attorney General, the Drug Enforcement Administration, and the Massachusetts State Police.

Design on the project began in 1995. It led to what is now known as the Group Violence Intervention (GVI), typically overseen by the National Network for Safe Communities, out of John Jay College of Criminal Justice in New York City, but has also been implemented independently by several jurisdictions. The Boston project launched in 1996 with an innovative partnership between practitioners and researchers. These groups came together to assess the youth homicide problem and implement the intervention, and found a substantial near-term impact on the problem. Operation Ceasefire was based on "pulling levers policing" deterrence strategies, which focus criminal justice enforcement on a small number of chronic offenders and gang-involved youth who were responsible for much of Boston's homicide problem.

Early impact evaluations suggested that the Ceasefire intervention was associated with significant reductions in youth homicide victimization, shots fired, calls for service, and gun assaults in Boston. Within two years of implementing Operation Ceasefire in Boston, the number of youth homicides dropped to ten, with one handgun-related youth homicide occurring in 1999 and 2000. After a change in supervising personnel within the Boston police department and city government, this first site was abandoned. Youth homicides began to climb again with 37 in 2005 and reaching a peak of 52 in 2010.

== Findings and results ==
=== The Pareto principle in Ceasefire ===
Research on the Ceasefire method has found a profound and so far invariant connection between serious violence and highly active criminal groups. A typical city-level finding is that groups collectively representing under 0.5% of the city's population will be connected as offenders, victims or both, with between half and three quarters of all homicide in the city—an example of the Pareto principle: a large proportion of the effects comes from a small proportion of the causes. This is likely to be an underestimate, as only incidents known to be connected to street groups are counted as such; a substantial portion of those not known will also be group connected.

In Boston, for example, which at the time had a population of roughly 556,180 people, approximately 1,500 individuals were identified as comprising 61 separate groups. This 0.3% of the population was responsible for 60% of the city's homicides. Researchers used a combination of police and probation records, field interviews, and mapping of street groups to identify high-risk individuals and groups. The study reinforced the idea that a small set of identifiable people and groups are repeatedly associated with serious violence, drawing on both quantitative data and qualitative interviews to map the social networks and gun markets. Similarly, in Cincinnati in 1997, which had a population of about 333,210, between 800 and 1,000 individuals—less than 0.3% of the population—were identified as being group related, and were responsible for 75% of the city's homicides.

=== Results and impact ===
Studies of Boston Operation Ceasefire found a 63% reduction in youth homicide. Since then, Operation Ceasefire has evolved into the National Network for Safe Communities' Group Violence Intervention. The Group Violence Intervention (GVI) has been deployed in dozens of cities – from Los Angeles to Providence, from Chicago to Nashville – over almost 20 years. A 2011 Campbell Collaboration Systematic Review of the strategies, and others related to them, concluded that there is now "strong empirical evidence" for their crime prevention effectiveness. Stockton's Operation Peacekeeper produced an overall 42% reduction in gun homicide in the city. The Chicago extension of the national Project Safe Neighborhoods initiative, has shown 37% reductions in homicide, while the Lowell, Massachusetts, Project Safe Neighborhoods efforts have produced 44% reductions in gun assault. A 34% reduction in homicide has been recorded in Indianapolis after the launch of the Indianapolis Violence Reduction Partnership. The Cincinnati Initiative to Reduce Violence (CIRV) has shown a 41% reduction in street group member-related homicides.

== Awards and recognition ==
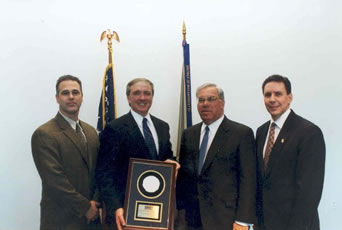
Boston Mayor Thomas Menino accepting the United States Department of Justice's "Outstanding Comprehensive Strategic Plan" award in 2003 on behalf of the Boston city government, with United States Attorney Michael Sullivan presenting the award

In 2003, the program received the United States Department of Justice's "Outstanding Comprehensive Strategic Plan Award".

== In fiction ==
The crime drama series City on a Hill shows a fictionalized account of Operation Ceasefire.

== Notable Documentaries ==
The Emmy nominated documentary Operation Ceasefire gives an inside look at the creation and implementation of the program through the testimonies of its key figures.
