= William Spelman =

American criminologist (1957 – 2025)

- Born: 1957
- Died: July 17, 2025 (aged 68)
- Education: Harvard University's John F. Kennedy School of Government (Ph.D., 1988)
- Scientific career
- Fields: Public policy, criminology
- Workplaces: University of Texas at Austin
- Thesis: The incapacitation benefits of selective criminal justice policies (1988)

William Spelman (1957 – July 17, 2025) was an American criminologist and politician who was professor of public affairs at the University of Texas at Austin's Lyndon B. Johnson School of Public Affairs. He was an expert on urban policy and criminal justice policy.

== Background ==
Spelman received an A.B. in political science from UCLA in 1977, an M.P.P. from Harvard University's John F. Kennedy School of Government in 1984, and a Ph.D. in public policy from Harvard University in 1988.

Spelman died on July 17, 2025, at the age of 68.

== Career ==
Between 1978 and 1988, Spelman was a researcher at the Police Executive Research Forum, an association of large U.S. law enforcement agencies. His work focused on the effectiveness of traditional police practices, showing among other things that fast police response only mattered in 10 percent of reported crimes. Between 1984 and 1988, he was one of the principal architects (with Herman Goldstein and John E. Eck) of problem-oriented policing, an alternative policing strategy that combines community policing with a continual improvement process.

From 1988, Spelman taught at the LBJ School of Public Affairs, University of Texas, where he continued research on criminal justice system effectiveness until his death in 2025. His work on prison effectiveness is controversial. Spelman’s estimate that up to 25 percent of the crime drop of the 1990s could be attributed to prison expansion has been disputed, most recently by Bruce Western.

Between 1997 and 2005, Spelman directed the Texas Institute for Public Problem-Solving (TIPPS), a regional community policing institute funded by the Office of Community Oriented Policing Services within the United States Department of Justice. TIPPS trained 13,000 police officers and their community partners from throughout Texas on the practice of community policing, and also trained police forces in Mexico and Brazil.

After serving on the Austin Water and Wastewater Commission for two years, Spelman served on the Austin City Council from 1997-2000, and again from 2009-2015. He was the only person ever elected to an open seat on the Austin City Council without opposition. As a council member, Spelman balanced support for the Austin Police Department with attempts to increase police accountability. His strong pro-neighborhood stance of the 1990s was tempered in the 2010s as rapid population growth increased traffic and affordability problems.

== Research ==
Spelman conducted research in the field of criminal justice policy, focused on topics including crime prevention, prison policy, policing strategies, and repeat offenders. In 1987, while working for the Police Executive Research Forum, he co-authored a study that found that after Newport News officials began improving the New Briarfield project and implementing a problem-oriented policing program there, the project's burglary rate dropped by 35%. In 2000, he published a study that found that incarceration reduced violent crime rates in the United States by 25% during the 1990s.
