= GVI =

GVI may refer to:

- Gentofte-Vangede Idrætsforening, a Danish football club
- Google Video
- Group Violence Intervention, a strategy from the National Network for Safe Communities
- Gulfstream GVI, a business jet
