= McGiven =

McGiven is a surname. Notable people with the surname include:

- Kevin McGiven (born 1977), American football player and coach
- Mick McGiven (born 1951), English footballer

== See also ==
- McGivern
- McNiven
