= Anne Piehl =

American economist and criminologist

- Born: Anne Morrison Piehl; November 13, 1964 (age 61)
- Education: Harvard University (A.B., 1986), Princeton University (Ph.D., 1994)
- Awards: The Rutgers College Class of 1962 Presidential Public Service Award (2015)
- Scientific career
- Fields: Criminology, economics
- Workplaces: Rutgers University
- Thesis: Economic issues in crime policy (1994)

Anne Morrison Piehl (born November 13, 1964) is an American economist and criminologist. She is a professor of economics at Rutgers University, the director of Rutgers' Program in Criminal Justice, and a research associate at the National Bureau of Economic Research. Her research interests include prisoner reentry programs and prison violence, immigration, corrections, and criminal sentencing.

== Career and Awards ==
Anne Piehl graduated from Harvard University with an A.B., and then received a Ph.D at Princeton University in 1994; both degrees were in the field of economics. During her studies, she was advised by economists David Card and Orley Ashenfelter.

In Piehl's early career, she worked as faculty at the Harvard Kennedy School of Government, and then proceeded to hold visiting positions at Princeton University, University of California-Berkeley, and University of Michigan School of Law.

She joined the faculty of Rutgers University as an associate professor in 2005 and was promoted to a full professor there in 2012. From 2008 to 2013, she directed the Rutgers Program in Criminal Justice, and became a fellow of the IZA Institute of Labor Economics in 2012. In 2020, she was named to the James Cullen Chair in economics, where she will serve a five-year term .

From 2011 to 2018, she has worked in the field of public policy through the National Academy of Sciences. She worked as a member of the Standing Committee on Law and Justice and testified before Congress and the United States Sentencing Commission regarding her research on the topic of Immigration.

Piehl has served on the New Jersey Committee on Government Efficiency and Reform (GEAR) Corrections/Sentencing Task Force and prepared expert testimony for the New Jersey Institute of Social Justice .

In 2015, Anne Piehl was granted the Rutgers College Class of 1962 Presidential Public Service Award due to her contributions in the field of criminal justice policy and practice .

== Research Areas ==
Dr. Piehl has published numerous articles, reports, and conference proceedings. Her most highly cited articles are "Problem-Oriented Policing, Deterrence, and Youth Violence: An Evaluation of Boston's Operation Ceasefire;" "Youth violence in Boston: Gun markets, serious youth offenders, and a use-reduction strategy;""Cross‐city evidence on the relationship between immigration and crime;" and "Judging Judicial Discretion: Legal Factors and Racial Discrimination in Sentencing;" each with over 450 citations.

=== Research on youth, crime, and Boston ===
Much of Piehl's research in the 1990s focused on youth crime in Boston. Piehl, as one of the co-leaders of the Boston Gun Project's Operation Ceasefire, contributed to a book for the U.S. Department of Justice about the project. Operation Ceasefire developed a problem-oriented policing approach and focused on reducing youth crime through addressing gun violence; the approach was implemented by local authorities in Boston, and the program's impact was subsequently evaluated, showing a reduction in youth crime as a result of the program. Along with her frequent collaborators David M. Kennedy (criminologist) and Anthony Braga, Piehl published a number of articles based on this work.

=== Research on prison build-ups, the cost-effectiveness of jail, and post-incarceration issues ===
Piehl has studied the cost-effectiveness of jail, weighing cost estimates of property and violent crimes against the costs of keeping prisoners and increasing the number of jails, and the impact of incarceration on crime at high levels of incarceration compared to low levels. Piehl also investigated the basis for popular support of prison buildup, and, three years later, causes for lessened prison disorder after prisons were built-up. She has also published several articles addressing incarceration release and post-incarceration lives, including modeling increased rates of crime when ex-convicts are released, reporting on reduced rates of recidivism due to targeted programs, and discussing the reduction of the US's reliance on mass incarceration for those persons already incarcerated for violent, non-violent, or both types of crimes. Piehl also participated in a work roundtable that released a report discussing policy and other requirements to increase work opportunities for formerly incarcerated persons, enabling easier re-entry upon release.

=== Research on immigration and crime ===
Another focus of Piehl's work has been the relationship between immigration and crime. Using public data, Piehl and her frequent collaborator Kristin Butcher show that the incarceration rates of newer cohorts of immigrants are lower than expected based on previous immigrant cohorts and that, controlling for the demographics of larger cities, new immigrants do not appear to have an impact on crime rates, while changes in crime rates are independent of immigration, even without control for demographics. Work Piehl conducted encompassing the early 20th century bears out the same result that immigrants are not incarcerated at the same rates as native-born citizens of the U.S. In addition, Piehl and Butcher show that in California, immigrants are only 1/10th as likely to be incarcerated as their native-born counterparts. Piehl and Butcher co-authored a book looking at the intersection of crime and immigration.

=== Research on judicial discretion ===
PIehl has published several papers in the area of judicial discretion in sentencing, often with Kristin Butcher and Shawn Bushway. Her work showed that plea bargains are rarely reached when the judge is considered "harsher" and that sentencing, which has traditionally been modeled as discriminating against younger offenders, may instead discriminate against older offenders who have had more years to commit crimes. In addition, the reduction of sentences due to plea bargaining can be compared and found unequal across jurisdictions and that analyses must be taken individually by jurisdiction or by institutional setting. She published on the racial implications of judicial discretion in sentencing; among other results, Piehl's models showed that judges tended to give sentences at the higher end for crimes with longer allowed sentences compared to the shorter end for shorter allowed sentences, which disproportionately impacts African-Americans.
