= Crime displacement =

Relocation of crime following police efforts

Crime displacement is the relocation of crime (or criminals) as a result of police crime-prevention efforts. Crime displacement has been linked to problem-oriented policing, but it may occur at other levels and for other reasons. Community-development efforts may be a reason why criminals move to other areas for their criminal activity. The idea behind displacement is that when motivated criminal offenders are deterred, they will commit crimes elsewhere. Geographic police initiatives include assigning police officers to specific districts so they become familiar with residents and their problems, creating a bond between law-enforcement agencies and the community. These initiatives complement crime displacement, and are a form of crime prevention. Experts in the area of crime displacement include Kate Bowers, Rob T. Guerette, and John E. Eck.

== Key concepts ==
Six types of crime displacement have been identified and defined. The first is temporal displacement, which involves criminal activity at different times of the day. The second is tactical displacement, which, according to Bowers and Johnson (2003), is "where offenders adopt a different modus operandi" (p. 276). The third type is target displacement, in which criminals select different types of targets. Type of crime displacement is the fourth type, involving offenders choosing a new crime to commit. Spatial displacement is when offenders commit crimes in new locations. Perpetrator displacement is the replacement of apprehended criminals by new ones.

Situational crime prevention may reduce opportunities for criminals to commit crime, making it more difficult (and riskier) to commit a criminal act and creating doubt in a criminal's mind that they can get away with a crime. Situational crime prevention uses the environment to create barriers to crime, and may be done by homeowners, architects and local officials. For example, making streets and buildings safer can reduce crime. Neighbors may play a role in reducing crime by becoming watchmen and notifying police of criminal activity. The basis of this theory is that crime can be prevented by altering situations, instead of changing a criminal’s disposition. According to Phillips (2011), "The criminologically-orthodox [sic] view of crime displacement is that displacement is not inevitable, is often less than anticipated, and that situational crime-prevention initiatives may even lead to a 'diffusion of benefits'" (p. 1). Situational crime prevention plays an important role in deterring crime, but may also displace it.

== Developments ==
Criminal justice scholars lacked a systematic approach to measuring crime displacement until the introduction of the weighted displacement quotient (WDQ) by rs and Johnson (2003). Although this tool is not widely recognized, its use has made displacement statistically recordable. WDQ is one part of understanding the effects of targeted law enforcement, but the ease with which the system can be used comes from its being a simple series of statistical tests on data. WDQ works as an overall process, and is an effective technique to measure the geographical displacement of crime. In addition to measuring this, the tool can also measure the diffusion of benefit of law-enforcement efforts.

== Empirical support ==
A study by Catherine Phillips for the Nottingham Trent University Division of Criminology reviewed the existing literature and performed a secondary analysis on the published results of empirical data. An orthodox view of displacement is considered throughout the study: crime displacement is considered inevitable, but is less than anticipated and may lead to a diffusion of benefits. Philips conducted the study to " ... discover whether the criminological orthodox 'knowledge' that interventions do not result in 100-percent crime displacement, and may even lead to a 'diffusion of benefits'—defined as ‘the unexpected reduction of crimes not directly targeted by the preventive action" could be proven (Clarke and Weisburd,1994:165). Reviewing a wide variety of published empirical data, Phillips found that displacement is not inevitable, but is very common. Sixty-three percent of the cases studied showed some sort of displacement, and a review of offender studies demonstrated 84.6 percent displacement. These results challenge the orthodox view on crime displacement, raising the question of whether the orthodox view is biased.

The second study was conducted by Matthijs F. J. Vijlbrief for the National Crime Squad of the Netherlands Police Agency in Driebergen, the Netherlands. Using the Dutch synthetic market as a case study, Vijlbrief (2012) assessed the role of displacement in organized crime. With the increase of barriers by government officials to obtaining precursor and essential chemicals, the question is how criminal organizations respond to a shortage of chemicals. Illegal organizations began by substituting other chemicals for specific precursors, making the drugs more dangerous to those using them. Criminals were initially not displaced, instead adapting to the new regulations. The study of potential adverse effects is a valuable tool in creating situational crime-prevention policies. By evaluating potential effects, a policy can be predicted to have a positive or negative result. Vijlbrief (2012) states in his research that "Some measures can be said to have a waterbed effect: repression of criminal activities in one location may cause an increase in the same criminal activities somewhere else. Displacement is not limited to geographical effects. Perpetrators may also shift their activities to completely different types of crime, or even continue to commit the same crime using different methods or means"( p. 199). Studying the relationship between interventions by law-enforcement bodies and displacement effects proved complex. One conclusion in the study by Vijlbrief (2012) is that "there is limited attention for displacement effects or the diffusion of benefits" (ibid; Kim et al. 2007); "It is difficult to isolate the effect of a given measure because neighboring factors always have an influence" (Shukla and Bartgis 2009, p. 354). Measuring displacement effects for an illegal organization in the synthetic drug market is complex, since the market is multifaceted and extensive. Organized criminals are likely to adapt their methods to changing circumstances, leading to displacement; this assumes that crime organizations have the resources to adapt to policy change.

There is also a large research literature examining the extent to which the introduction of CCTV causes spatial displacement of crime. A systematic review of this literature published in 2009 concluded that CCTV schemes "usually showed evidence of no displacement rather than displacement or diffusion of benefits". Similarly, a more recent review of randomized controlled trials and natural experiments assessing the effects of CCTV concluded that the "evidence on the prevalence of displacement and diffusion of benefit was mixed".

== Criticism ==
Criticism in this field goes beyond targeting the term "displacement", also touching upon the policies cause this phenomenon. One is police-oriented policies which are applied widely in police districts in the United States. According to Ratcliffe (2009), "Police departments can respond to a rise in crime with a series of high-visibility, directed, uniform patrol deployment initiatives" (p. 230). Deploying a variety of resources, such as extra officers and heightened surveillance of community crime hotspots, can counteract criminal conduct. Targeted law enforcement has been criticized as a primary reason for crime displacement to other areas. The manipulation of environmental factors to prevent crime has also been supported by scholars, who argue that the targeting of specific crime problems (and areas) in a community can result in the diffusion of benefits. According to Ratcliffe (2009), diffusion of benefits results in " ... crime-reduction benefits of the police operation spill[ing] over into areas not directly targeted by the law-enforcement action" (p. 231). rs and Johnson (2003) report that a central rationale behind displacement " ... is that it can only be attributed to crime-prevention activity if crime is reduced in the targeted area considered". If crime relocates for other reasons, it does not constitute crime displacement. Situational crime prevention (SCP), allied with crime displacement and diffusion of benefits, is also a target of criticism. Philips (2011) writes, " ... a major criticism of such physical SCP strategies has been the threat of crime displacement, and the assertion that the foreclosure of one type of criminal opportunity (will) simply shift the incidence of crime to different forms, times and locales" (Repetto, 1976:167). The ability of criminals to adapt to changing law-enforcement policies allows for other types of criminal activity.

== Crime-prevention implications ==
Crime displacement as crime prevention is contradictory, suggesting further development of the weighted displacement quotient (WDQ). Before the WDQ, investigating the phenomenon was difficult. rs (2003) writes that the " ... WDQ not only measures what occurs in a buffer zone (displacement) but also relates changes in this area to those in the target area" (p. 712). Using the WDQ can facilitate the work of researchers seeking to reduce crime in their community while minimizing the negative impact on surrounding areas. If a community is experiencing an increase in car thefts (especially on dimly-lit streets), as a situational crime-prevention strategy the county can invest in brighter street-light bulbs. As a follow-up measure, law-enforcement agencies can advise communities about possible sting operations in hotspot areas (making the crime riskier to commit, and dissuading potential thieves). Measures such as these will reduce theft in an area, potentially displacing the crime to a neighboring community. By measuring data with the WDQ system, law-enforcement agents can pinpoint the areas most affected and calculate the diffusion of benefits. Sharing data with other agencies will create an information network capable of preventing crime over a broader area.

== See also ==
- Crime hotspots
- Displacement (psychology)
- Regulatory crime control
- Trans-cultural diffusion
