= McGivern =

McGivern Is an anglicized form of Gaelic Mac Uidhrín, a patronymic from a personal name which is from a diminutive of odhar ‘dun’. This surname is also found in Galloway in Scotland, where it is of Irish origin. They belonged to Cenél Fearadhaigh, or 'race of Ferry', descend from Feradach mac Muiredach (Ferry MacMurdoch), a great-grandson of Niall of the Nine Hostages, and by the 12th century controlled a large portion of County Tyrone and had penetrated deep into County Fermanagh but were reduced in the mid-14th century, by the Maguires.

Annals of Loch Cé

- Late 11th century: Uidhrin Ua Maoil-Muire (d. 1082) was chief of Cinel Fearadhaigh. Note: He was father of Eachmarcach.
- Early 11th century: Eachmarcach Mac Uidhrin (d. 1120) was chief of Cinel Fearadhaigh, and his son was Giolla-Christ Ua hUidhrin in the present Co. Tyrone.
- 1129: Gillachrist Mac Uidhrin (son of Eachmarcach), chief of Cenel-Fcradhaigh, was burned in the house of his fosterer, in Tir-Manach, in treachery.

Cnoc Mhig Uidhrin, meaning "MacGivern's Hill"

This was used as the general name for the Bishop's four mensal townlands in Garvaghy Parish, Co. Down. All their names were, Knockgorm, Killaney, Castlevennon and Balloolymore. There were many clergy of the MacGivern name in Dromore Diocese in the 15th century and there could be a link between some of them and the townland.

Notable people with the surname include:

- Barbara McGivern (1945–2019), Canadian artist
- Cecil McGivern (1907–1963), BBC One controller
- Ed McGivern (1874–1957), American exhibition shooter and author
- Gary McGivern (1944–2001), American murderer
- Geoff McGivern (footballer) (1930–2015), Australian rules footballer
- Geoffrey McGivern (born 1952), English actor
- John McGivern (born 1954), American actor
- Laurence McGivern (born 1992), paralympic swimmer from Northern Ireland
- Leighton McGivern (born 1984), English footballer
- Ryan McGivern (born 1990), Northern Ireland international footballer
- Sam McGivern (born 1963), Scottish footballer
- William P. McGivern (1918–1982), American writer

== See also ==
- McGovern
