= James Fyfe =

American criminologist (1942–2005)

James J. Fyfe (February 16, 1942 – November 12, 2005) was an American criminologist, a leading authority on the police use of force and police accountability, and a police administrator.

His research on the police use of deadly force has been cited extensively, most notably in the 1985 Supreme Court case of Tennessee v. Garner, in which the Court ruled as unconstitutional police department policies that allow officers to shoot to kill "fleeing felons" who do not pose an immediate danger to the community. The Supreme Court cited his dissertation in its majority opinion.

== Career ==
Fyfe rose to the rank of lieutenant with the New York Police Department (NYPD) and in 1978, after 15 years of service with the NYPD, earned a PhD in Criminal Justice from the University at Albany, SUNY.

He became a professor of criminal justice at American University in Washington, D.C. (1979–92), then at Temple University in Philadelphia (1992–99), and finally at John Jay College of Criminal Justice (1999–2005), where he was appointed distinguished professor in 2002. He wrote hundreds of scholarly and popular newspaper articles and regularly appeared on media outlets discussing police practices.

During those years, he also served as an expert witness in lawsuits against the police, researching and testifying in over 500 cases on behalf of the police or against them. He worked on such well-known police misconduct cases as the Tracey Thurman case (police response to domestic violence), a series of cases challenging the Los Angeles Police Department's use of a "Special Investigations" squad (which resulted in a finding of personal liability on the part of Chief Daryl Gates), the Jeffrey Dahmer case (in which Milwaukee police did not respond to the serial murderer's victimization of a young immigrant boy), the Ruby Ridge shooting, a series of cases from Philadelphia, and hundreds of others in which police use of deadly force was at issue. Perhaps the most controversial of these was Fyfe's testimony in the Amadou Diallo case in New York City, which was a homicide prosecution of four officers who had shot and killed an unarmed West African immigrant. Fyfe testified on behalf of the officers, believing their state of mind and the performance of their semi-automatic weapons showed they were not criminally guilty. (They were acquitted.) Whether the NYPD itself should be held responsible in civil court for the program that put the officers on patrol under those rules was a different matter, and the Diallo family eventually received $3,000,000 as compensation. Such civil lawsuits seek to hold the police to a common standard of professionalism discernible in practices and procedures developed in good police departments nationwide. Fyfe regularly testified as to what those standards were, almost always as part of lawsuits charging police departments with operating under unconstitutional "custom, policy, or practice."

Fyfe's papers are housed in the Special Collections at Lloyd Sealy Library, John Jay College of Criminal Justice.

== Published works ==
- 1997 Police Administration, 5th edition, with Jack R. Greene, William F. Walsh, O.W. Wilson, and Roy Clinton McLaren
- 1992 Above the Law: Police and the Excessive Use of Force, with Jerome Skolnick
- 1989 Police Practice in the '90s: Key Management Issues
- 1982 Readings on Police Use of Deadly Force
- 1981 Contemporary Issues in Law Enforcement
