= Lloyd Sealy =

NYPD Officer

Lloyd George Sealy
- Born: January 4, 1917
- Died: January 4, 1985 (aged 68)
- Education: Thomas Jefferson High School (Brooklyn)
- Alma mater: John Jay College of Criminal Justice
- Known for: First African-American commander of an NYPD precinct
- Notable work: The Community and the Police: Conflict or Cooperation (1974)
- Police career
- Department: New York City Police Department (NYPD)
- Rank: Assistant Chief Inspector
- Memorials: Lloyd Sealy Library at John Jay College
- Other work: Associate Professor of Law and Police Science; Founding member of NOBLE

Lloyd George Sealy (January 4, 1917 – January 4, 1985) was the NYPD's first African-American officer to graduate from the FBI National Academy. A graduate of Thomas Jefferson High School (Brooklyn) and the first African-American officer in the NYPD to make rank as the commander of a police station in 1963 serving the 28th precinct in Harlem. He was also the first African-American officer to serve as Assistant Chief Inspector and Borough Commander serving the Patrol Borough of Brooklyn North (which included historical African-American communities such as Bedford-Stuyvesant, Brownsville, Weeksville, Clinton Hill, Fort Greene, and East New York, among others) in 1966.

After Sealy's retirement from the NYPD in 1969, he became the first African-American Associate Professor of Law and Police Science at John Jay College of Criminal Justice., and a founding member of NOBLE, a national organization of African-American police officers from various American cities. In 1974, Sealy published The Community and the Police: Conflict or Cooperation with co-author Joseph Fink. In this book, Sealy and Fink wrote that "if people are to view the police as an integral and beneficial component of the community structure, the police must improve the social service aspect of their mission," but that too often police attitudes are self-serving rather than community-serving. To address this problem, they proposed increased minority recruitment, human services training, and citizen participation in law enforcement.

Sealy died in 1985 on his 68th birthday. He had been preparing for his classes in the John Jay College Library when he suffered a heart attack.

On December 4, 1991, the library at John Jay was renamed the Lloyd Sealy Library in his honor. The Special Collections there house his personal papers, which document his career as a police officer and a scholar.
