= Gerald W. Lynch =

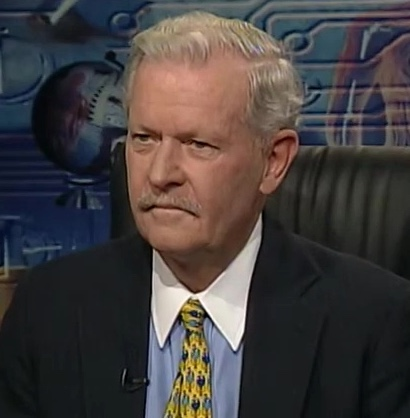
- Lynch on CUNY TV's Education Forum, 1999

Third president of the John Jay College of Criminal Justice
- In office 1976–2004
- Preceded by: Donald Riddle
- Succeeded by: Jeremy Travis

Personal details
- Born: March 24, 1937
- Died: April 17, 2013 (aged 76)
- Children: 2
- Education: Fordham University
- Alma mater: New York University
- Occupation: Psychologist, educator, administrator
- Known for: Expansion of John Jay College of Criminal Justice

Gerald W. Lynch (March 24, 1937 – April 17, 2013) was the third president of John Jay College of Criminal Justice, the only institution of higher education in the United States dedicated primarily to the study of criminal justice, law enforcement, police science, and public service. He served as president for 28 years, from 1976 to 2004.

He first joined the John Jay faculty in 1967 as associate professor of psychology and Director of Student Activities, then served as acting president in 1975 upon President Donald Riddle's resignation.

During Lynch's presidency, John Jay grew from a small police science college to a center of research, education, and training in criminal justice and public safety. Under his leadership, John Jay weathered the City University Board of Trustees' threat to shut down the college in 1976 during a time of fiscal crisis for CUNY and New York City as a whole. The college decided to trim its budget to remain independent rather than merge with Baruch College, advocating throughout the campaign the sentiment voiced by Lynch in a memo: "John Jay can contribute to the city as a unique resource to help solve the problems of crime, public productivity, manpower needs, and budget management."

In 1980, at Lynch's urging, the college established its first doctorate program in criminal justice. In the next two decades of Lynch's presidency, enrollment and the faculty grew, the school's external activities expanded, the college supported more curricular cultural diversity, the endowment increased, and John Jay embraced an approach to education more attuned to the liberal arts.

Lynch lectured throughout the United States, the Caribbean, Europe, the former Soviet Union, the Middle East, and Australia. "Human Dignity and the Police", an innovative course to improve relations between police and public, was developed at John Jay and is taught throughout Latin America and the Caribbean, as well as to police from more than 40 countries in Africa, Asia and Europe.

The Gerald W. Lynch Theater on West 59th Street opened in 1988 and is named after him.

== Personal life ==
Lynch received his B.S. from Fordham University and his PhD in Clinical Psychology from New York University. He died on April 17, 2013, aged 76, and was survived by his wife and two children.
