= Karol Mason =

American academic administrator

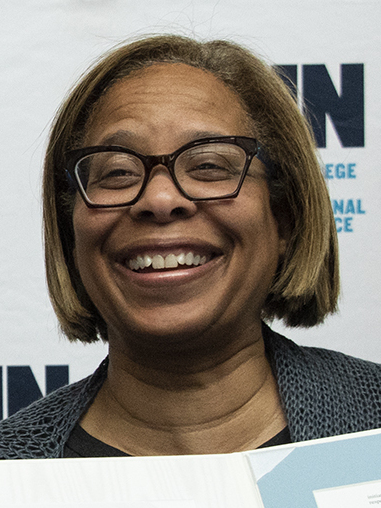

5th President of the John Jay College of Criminal Justice
- Incumbent
- Assumed office August 2017
- Preceded by: Jeremy Travis

Personal details
- Born: Karol Virginia Mason; August 20, 1957 (age 68) Amityville, New York, U.S.
- Party: Democratic
- Education: University of North Carolina, Chapel Hill (BA); University of Michigan, Ann Arbor (JD)

Karol Virginia Mason is an American attorney, government appointee, and academic administrator, serving as the fifth president of John Jay College of Criminal Justice since August 2017. Formerly, she was an Assistant Attorney General in charge of the Office of Justice Programs in the Obama Administration.

== Early life and education ==
Mason was born in Amityville, New York, on August 20, 1957. She earned a B.A. in mathematics in 1979 at the University of North Carolina and a J.D. from the University of Michigan Law School. At law school, she lived across the hall from Valerie Jarrett, and was notes editor for the University of Michigan Journal of Law Reform. She served for a year as law clerk for Judge John F. Grady in the U.S. District Court for the Northern District of Illinois.

== Career ==
Mason was an attorney for nearly three decades at the international Atlanta law firm Alston & Bird, where she headed the public finance group. She was made the firm's first black woman partner in 1990.

=== Obama campaign and administration ===
Mason worked on the 2008 Obama campaign on the finance committee raising money in Georgia. She joined the Obama administration's Justice Department, serving as a deputy associate attorney general from April 2009 to February 2012. After a year back at Alston & Bird, Mason returned to the Justice Department as head of the Office of Justice Programs (OJP) from 2013 to 2017.

Mason was a low five-figure contributor to "Democratic candidates and causes" from 1994 to 2013 and a low four-figure contributor to Republicans over the same period.

In 2016, as part of National Reentry Week addressing the challenges of prisoners leaving incarceration, Mason instituted a policy in OJP to "no longer use words such as 'felon' or 'convict' to refer to released prisoners". Also, noting the 50th anniversary of the landmark Jerry Gault case, Mason co-wrote a column about juvenile justice and access to legal counsel as part of department efforts. In October, Mason and New York County District Attorney Cyrus Vance Jr. joined in the National Network of Safe Communities (NNSC) and John Jay's Institute for Innovation in Prosecution (IIP) initiative.

=== John Jay College ===
Mason is the first woman and first African-American to serve as president of John Jay. She succeeded Jeremy Travis, who had served since 2004.
