= Gary McGivern =

American convicted murderer (1944–2001)

Gerald "Gary" McGivern (October 26, 1944 – November 19, 2001) was an American felon found guilty in 1967 of the armed robbery of a gas station in Pelham Manor, New York, United States, during which two police officers were wounded. McGivern was tried with his partner in the robbery, Charles Culhane, and was sentenced to ten to twenty years in state prison. On September 13, 1968, McGivern, Culhane and a third convict, Robert Bowerman, were being transported by two deputies, from Auburn State Prison to a court hearing in White Plains. During a rest stop along the New York State Thruway, a deputy's gun was seized in an attempted escape. During the struggle inside the police car, a deputy and Bowerman were shot to death.

McGivern and Culhane contended that Bowerman acted alone in the escape attempt, and that Bowerman killed the deputy. Following one trial ending in a hung jury, a second trial in which they were sentenced to death, then a successful appeal of that death sentence, in a third trial they were found guilty of felony murder and sentenced to 25 years to life. In a controversial New Year's Eve 1985 decision, New York Governor Mario Cuomo granted McGivern clemency, and he was paroled three years later.

== Early life ==
McGivern was born in Manhattan, the son of Gertrude Burke and Thomas McGivern, who were both born and raised in Belfast, Northern Ireland. He attended Catholic schools and served in the United States Navy. He lived with his family in the Throgs Neck section of the Bronx.

McGivern's first serious brush with the law was for marijuana possession in the Bronx. Culhane was his codefendant in a robbery of a gas station in Pelham, New York, in December 1966. Instead of accepting a plea bargain of five years in the case, McGivern chose to go to trial. The Westchester County court sentenced him to ten to twenty years in state prison. Sing Sing prison was McGivern's first destination and then upstate to Auburn Prison where he left for White Plains, New York, Westchester's county seat, on September 13, 1968, to appear as a witness in a court hearing for Culhane.

== September 13, 1968 ==
On September 13, 1968, McGivern, Culhane and a third prisoner Robert Bowerman left Auburn prison with two deputies for a court hearing ordered by Westchester County Judge John C. Marbach, a former district attorney and trial lawyer. Marbach acted on Culhane's coram nobis application to determine the validity of Culhane's claim of improper sentencing in the Pelham Manor case. He approved a hearing on the matter.

Westchester County Sheriff Daniel F. McMahon sent two of his deputies—Joseph Singer and William Fitzgerald—to Auburn to pick up the three prisoners and deliver them to court in White Plains. McMahon was the former Public Safety Commissioner of Yonkers and a former chief of the criminal division of the office of the United States Attorney in New York. He had been elected Westchester's county sheriff the previous January in 1968.

Robert Bowerman, a jailhouse lawyer at Auburn, prepared the coram nobis application for Culhane. Bowerman had a history of escape attempts. Although he claimed in the legal papers to have personal knowledge of Culhane's case, Bowerman had never been arrested in Westchester County and had no association with the 1967 robbery case. An assistant for the Westchester County DA's office, B. Anthony Morosco, formally opposed Bowerman attending the hearing.

The five men left Auburn Prison on the morning of September 13 in a 1967 blue Chevrolet owned by Deputy Fitzgerald. It was not equipped with a security screen between the front and back seats. All five men dressed in plainclothes. The vehicle headed south on the New York State Thruway.

On three occasions before lunch, Robert Bowerman requested that the deputies stop while he urinated along the side of the road. The deputies allowed Bowerman to leave the vehicle.

When the Chevrolet passed through Ulster County on the Thruway in the early afternoon, Robert Bowerman asked the deputies to stop the vehicle again. The sequence of what happened next became the source of considerable dispute over the next three decades in three trials, numerous appeals, the polygraph tests McGivern passed, news coverage and controversy surrounding the grant of executive clemency.

Deputy Sheriff William Fitzgerald and the prisoner Robert Bowerman were shot to death inside the car at Milepost 67.4. Culhane and McGivern maintained it was a solo escape attempt by Bowerman who was responsible for killing Deputy Fitzgerald. The surviving deputy Joseph Singer claimed McGivern shot Fitzgerald and that the escape attempt involved all three prisoners.

Culhane and McGivern were indicted for felony murder, with attempted escape in the second degree as the underlying felony. The Ulster County Legislature passed a resolution on June 3, 1971 (Resolution 129) "that the office of the Ulster County Attorney be empowered to conduct a detailed legal investigation of the facts surrounding this crime to determine if there is sufficient grounds for instituting a negligence action against Westchester County, the Westchester County Sheriff and the State of New York for its statutory obligation."

Ulster County's legislators expected to be reimbursed for the cost of prosecuting the case, a crime which occurred within Ulster's borders on the Thruway. Ulster County's attempt to recoup damages was unsuccessful.

== Three trials in Ulster County, New York ==
In an atmosphere of negative media coverage, the first trial in Kingston, New York, in 1969 ended in a hung jury. "Editorials of the Air" were the trademark of a Kingston radio station managed by Harry Thayer, the son of the former commissioner of corrections of the State of New York, Dr. Walter N. Thayer Jr., who served the state from 1931 to 1936. Harry Thayer broadcast controversial editorials on the air during all three Culhane-McGivern trials in Ulster County.

The juries in the Culhane-McGivern trials considered two versions of eyewitness testimony. In the investigation following the incident, the police did not conduct fingerprint tests on the weapons or other forensic tests which might have strengthened one eyewitness version of the account over the other.

Following the hung jury in 1969, Harry Thayer publicly admonished the jurors on the air for not returning a verdict, calling it an example of "Lace Panty Justice," a term meaning "soft on crime".

In the second trial in 1970 a jury found the defendants guilty, and Harry Thayer advocated for the death penalty on the air. The defendants were sentenced to death and sent to death row at Green Haven Correctional Facility across the Hudson River from Ulster County, where they remained in the death house for 33 months.

Defense attorneys filed an appeal brief citing negligence in the case investigation, inconsistencies in the testimony of Singer, the prosecution's main witness, negative pretrial publicity, an unfair jury selection process, and denials of motions for a change of venue.

In October 1973 the New York State Court of Appeals unanimously overturned the convictions and death sentences, saying that four jurors who had shown a bias in favor of conviction should have been excused. The decision also noted that "Singer's testimony. . .was inconsistent as to certain particulars" and "... the prosecutor's evidence --taken in the context of this particular trial-- presented substantial questions of credibility for the jury's consideration." (October 23, 1973 decision, 33 N.Y. 2nd at 95 and n.1). The Court ordered a new trial.

The third trial, in March 1975, ended in convictions and sentences of 25 years to life. The Culhane-McGivern Defense Fund was sponsored by the folk singer Pete Seeger, the poet Allen Ginsberg and the political commentator William F. Buckley Jr. The third trial conviction was upheld on appeal. Dissent highlighted the judge's unfair charge to the jury and the suppression of Robert Bowerman's prior history of escape attempts. Appeals attempting to overturn the third trial conviction were filed by attorneys Michael Tigar, William Kunstler, Karen Peters, John Mage and John Privitera. The conviction was upheld but not without dissent.

== Executive clemency ==
McGivern's and Culhane's paths now diverged. They were sent to different prisons, McGivern to the Green Haven Correctional Facility and Culhane to the Attica Correctional Facility, and elected to pursue different paths to gaining release.

McGivern took and passed two polygraph tests in 1979 regarding his involvement in the crime. The tests were administered by Charles Jones, a member of the Case Review Committee of the American Polygraph Association and Lincoln Zonn, who had had his own company and polygraph institute for the previous 30 years. Zonn's clients included the U.S. government and many law enforcement agencies. A group of religious leaders including the Green Haven prison chaplain presented a petition seeking clemency for McGivern. Lieutenant Governor Mario Cuomo formally recommended that New York Governor Hugh Carey commute McGivern's sentence. The district attorney of Ulster County, Michael Kavanagh, publicly opposed the clemency recommendation throughout its lifetime. Governor Carey declined to act on the recommendation.

Mario Cuomo, a Democrat, was elected governor of New York State in 1983. During his twelve years in office, he granted a total of 33 clemencies. On December 31, 1985, he granted clemency to McGivern, an act that brought a firestorm of criticism from Republicans at state and national levels as well as from law enforcement personnel. The parole board granted McGivern parole three years later, and he was released on March 17, 1989, after 22 years in prison.

== Later life, death, and legacy ==
McGivern was married to Marguerite Culp, a reporter for the Woodstock Times, from 1978 until 1991.

On June 13, 1994, McGivern was arrested for drug possession, a parole violation, and he was returned to prison.

He died of cancer in Albany Medical Hospital on November 19, 2001.

McGivern's papers are housed in the Special Collections of Lloyd Sealy Library at John Jay College of Criminal Justice in New York City. The Gary McGivern and Marguerite Culp Papers include correspondence, writings, journals, legal documents, news articles, artifacts, and photographs dating from 1967 to 2003.
