= Lloyd Sealy Library =

Library in New York City

Coordinates: 40.7703°N 73.9883°W

Lloyd George Sealy Library
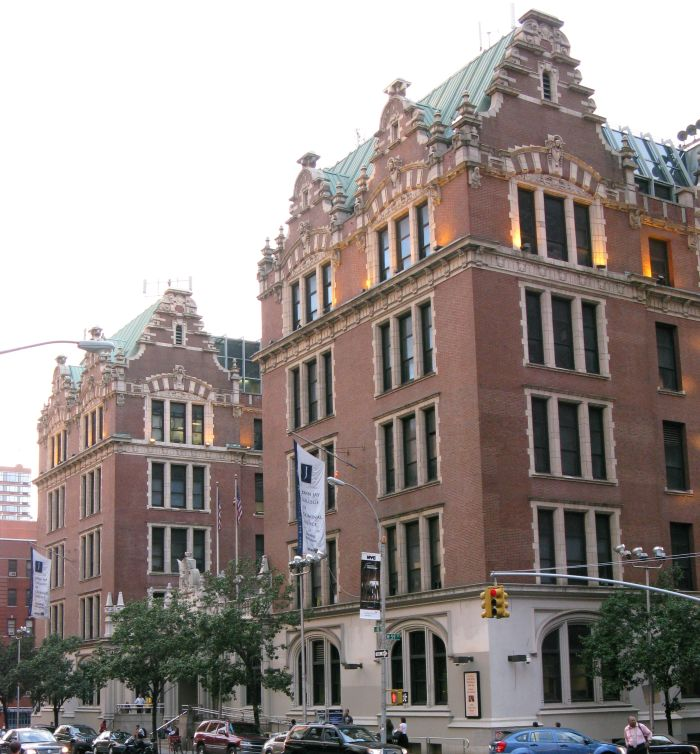
- Location: 899 Tenth Avenue; New York, New York 10019; United States
- Established: 1965

Other information
- Director: Larry E. Sullivan
- Website: www.lib.jjay.cuny.edu

The Lloyd George Sealy Library is the campus library at the John Jay College of Criminal Justice of the City University of New York (CUNY) in Manhattan. Located in Haaren Hall, the library specializes in criminal justice-related materials.

== Overview ==
The Lloyd Sealy Library serves the students, faculty, and staff of John Jay College of Criminal Justice. Other current members of the CUNY community and approved researchers also have access to the Library and its collections.

Located on the first and second floors of Haaren Hall, the Library houses study space, computer labs, stacks (open circulating collection), reference (open non-circulating collection) and special collections (open and closed non-circulating collection). The first floor entrance is flanked by the Reserve Room computer lab and the Niederhoffer Lounge, named for Arthur Niederhoffer, one of the founding faculty members of the college.

As of 2013, 17 faculty members and 17 staff members and adjunct librarians work at the Library.

== History ==
John Jay College of Criminal Justice was established in 1964 and first opened its doors to enrolled police officers in 1965. At the time, the college was located in the Police Academy building on East 20th St., in which 3,085 square feet (286.6 m^{2}) was allotted to the Library. The first Chief Librarian was Howard D. Washburn, and under his leadership, two more librarians were hired before 1967. The Library began to amass its collections based on recommendations from the college's faculty. In addition, the Library made arrangements with criminal justice agencies across the country, including the New York Police Department, whose annual reports and patrol guides are deposited in the Library.

As the college expanded, so too did the Library. By the late 1960s, its collection was split between the Police Academy building, 360 Park Avenue South, and the top floor of the Strand Bookstore. In 1974, the Library consolidated its collection and moved to the college's new building, North Hall, located at West 59th St. and 10th Ave., under the leadership of Chief Librarian Carol Alexander. The next Chief Librarian, Eileen Rowland, was appointed in 1977, by which time the Library's collection had grown to over 100,000 books and media.

In 1988, John Jay purchased Haaren Hall, the building across from North Hall. As the building's interior was being designed, "the administration pressed from the start for the library to be its focal point" to emphasize the college's commitment to higher education. The Library was moved into spacious facilities on the first and second floors of Haaren Hall. Marilyn Lutzker took over as Chief Librarian in 1989. In 1991, the John Jay College Library was renamed the Lloyd George Sealy Library, in honor of one of John Jay's most respected faculty members.

In 1995, Larry E. Sullivan became Chief Librarian after having served as Chief of Rare Books and Special Collections at the Library of Congress.

== Collections ==
The Library now holds over 500,000 books, periodicals, microfilms, and digital collections. Its holdings are particularly strong in criminal justice and related areas, including forensic science, forensic psychology, and fire science, in addition to social science, law, and public administration. In addition, the Library provides the John Jay community with access to more than 300 subscription databases, over 160,000 journals and newspapers, and more than 65,000 e-books.

=== Special Collections ===
The Special Collections holds thousands of rare books and unique materials related to criminal justice. The Special Collections also houses the archives of John Jay College of Criminal Justice and the Trial Transcripts of the County of New York 1883–1927 collection, which contains verbatim typewritten proceedings of 3,326 court cases. Many items from the Special Collections have been digitized and are available from the Digital Collections.

The Library holds the papers of:

- Lloyd Sealy, faculty member and the first African-American officer in the NYPD to make rank as the commander of a police station
- Flora Rheta Schreiber, author of Sibyl
- Lewis E. Lawes, prison warden and a proponent of prison reform
- Benjamin Ward, the first African-American New York City Police Commissioner
- Albert DeSalvo, criminal who claimed to be the Boston Strangler
- James Fyfe, renowned criminologist
- William C. Dodge, prominent American lawyer
- The Mollen Commission, appointed to investigate corruption in the NYPD
- Richard Louis Dugdale, the sociologist who wrote about the Jukes
- Burton Turkus, the attorney who prosecuted members of Murder, Inc.
- Gary McGivern, American felon
- Horatio Bottomley, British politician and swindler
- Marvin E. Frankel, renowned legal scholar
