= Focused deterrence =

Crime prevention strategy

Focused deterrence (also known as pulling levers policing) is a crime prevention strategy which aims to deter crime by increasing the swiftness, severity and certainty of punishment for crimes by implementing a mix of law enforcement, social services, and community mobilization.

The focused deterrence approach has been applied to identify underlying causes of gun injury-related problems and tailors specific solutions to each of them. The available evidence indicates that these programs are notably effective at reducing gun violence, though this may not be due to the provision social services.

Among the focused deterrence programs in the United States is the Operation Ceasefire program in Boston, which aimed to concentrate law enforcement efforts on violent criminals in crime "hot spots". This first program, created by criminologist David M. Kennedy, inspired focused deterrence programs such as Operation Peacekeeper in Stockton and other forms of Operation Ceasefire in Rochester, Newark, and Los Angeles.
