= Scanning, Analysis, Response, and Assessment =

Scanning, Analysis, Response, and Assessment (SARA) is a problem-solving process used in problem-oriented policing. It is one of the most popular methods in problem-oriented policing.

== History ==
SARA was first proposed in 1987 by John E. Eck and William Spelman of the Police Executive Research Forum. Police interventions based on SARA increased as a result of the broken windows theory of crime first proposed in the 1980s.

== Method ==
SARA consists of four stages:

- Scanning: The officer identifies an issue and determines if it represents a problem that needs to be addressed.
- Analysis: The officer collects information about the problem from various sources to understand the causes and scope of the problem.
- Response: The officer uses the information to create and implement and response.
- Assessment: The response's effectiveness is evaluated. Results of the assessment can be used to inform to revise the response in the future.

Eck and Spelman identified the "Analysis" stage as the most important of the four stages. The "Assessment" stage was noted as "often the most ignored part of the SARA model" by the Evidence-Based Policing App.

== Variations ==
SARA compared to SPATIAL
Scan		Analyze	Respond		Assess	
Scan	Prioritize	Analyze	Task	Intervene	Assess	Learn

Transport for London created a revised approach to policing based on SARA, which they called SPATIAL. Scan, Prioritize, Analyse, Task, Intervene, Assess and Learn. Adding the step "Prioritize" was judged necessary, as limits to funding mean not all problems can be addressed.
