= Barbara McGivern =

Canadian artist (1945–2019)

- Born: Barbara McGivern; 15 August 1945; Toronto, Canada
- Died: 10 March 2019 (aged 73); Toronto, Canada
- Education: Ontario College of Art & Design
- Known for: Painter
- Website: http://www.bmcgivern.com/

Barbara McGivern (born August 15, 1945 – March 9, 2019), also known as The Gold Lady, was a Canadian artist from Toronto, Ontario. One of her best known series is The Extraordinary Journey. The series was inspired by her trips through the deserts of Oman and Saudi Arabia, when she began incorporating the use of gold leaf into her work. Her style is most notable for presenting gold as a colour rather than as a precious metal. Her paintings are in private and corporate collections in Canada, Europe and the Middle East.

== Early life and education ==
McGivern grew up in Toronto and for almost 40 years maintained a residence at the Manulife Centre which was a gathering place for members of the local arts community. In 1971, she went to Europe, for five years. Settling in London in the fall of 1974 she became a member of both The Arts Club and Chelsea Arts Club. Returning to Toronto in 1976 she worked with Columbia Pictures Television until 1981 when they stopped producing television programs. McGivern then started painting at her first art studio in downtown Toronto. Her work at that time was mostly naive and was inspired by the English artist Beryl Cook. Around that time she got accepted by the Ontario College of Art and Design she studied with Canadian artists such as Graham Coughtry and Ian Carr-Harris. She graduated in 1988 in Experimental Arts at OCAD.

In 1992, McGivern went to Russia where she saw works by the Impressionist artist Matisse at the Hermitage and Fernando Botero at the Pushkin, Moscow. During the same trip she saw the Barnes Collection at the Musée d'Orsay, Paris. She produced a series of paintings based on Impressionist works, with her own interpretation of The Barnes Collection, which was later shown at Musee Hotel Baudy in Giverny. Throughout the 1990s, McGivern was represented by galleries in Yorkville, Toronto, Montreal, Edmonton as well as Zurich, Berlin, London, Paris, and Madrid.

== The Extraordinary Journey ==
In 1996, McGivern went on an off-road driving trip across the Middle East, following the British adventurer Wilfred Thesiger's path through the deserts of Oman and Saudi Arabia, covering 3,000 miles in eight days. While driving through the deserts she was amazed with the colours she saw and the richness of the sands which opened up a new concept to her work, where her acrylic paintings now recounted the deserts from a Canadian prospective, using gold as a colour as opposed to a precious metal. "My paintings are inspired by my trips, especially to the deserts of Oman and the UAE. I found the dunes to be a magical place with colours that I never thought could be possible in such a vastness of sand" stated McGivern in 1998. She was commissioned to do 22 paintings for the Jumeirah Emirates Towers Hotel. Her work has been sold to major collectors such as Sheikh Mohammed bin Rashid Al Maktoum and the Al Qasimi, UAE as well as different corporate collectors. When asked to do two horses for the Dubai's Celebration of Arabian Horses, her horse Victory was commissioned by Frayland and Penquin, Engineering and was the third largest winner in the auction held by Christie's for 210,000 AED. The second horse Red Fantasy was also commissioned by Delwood Consultancy. McGivern represented Canada at the Women & Art, 2005, A Global Perspective, Sharjah UAE.

== Solo exhibitions ==
- 2009 Lando Gallery, Edmonton, Alberta, Canada
- 2009 Gallerie Bohner, Manhiem, Germany
- 2008 Arts Club, London, England
- 2007 Lindsay Gallery, Lindsay, Ontario.
- 2006 Nomad Gallery, London, England
- 2006 Spoke Gallery, Toronto, Ontario
- 2005 Grand Canvas', Majlis Gallery, Grand Hyatt, Dubai, UAE
- 2005 Lando Gallery, Edmonton, Alberta
- 2005 INDEX 05, Canadian Pavilion, Dubai, UAE
- 2004 Extraordinary Journey, Majlis Gallery, Dubai, UAE
- 2004 INDEX 04, Canadian Pavilion, Dubai, UAE
- 2002 Westdale Gallery, Hamilton, Ontario
- 2001 Paintings in My Mind, Teodora Art Gallery, Toronto
- 2000 Makepeace, McGivern, Furniture & Painting, Prime Gallery, Toronto
- 1999 Teodora Art Gallery, Original Sense, Toronto, Ontario
- 1999 Extraordinary Journey, Ozten Zeki Gallery London, England
- 1997 The Barnes Collection Series, Musée Hotel Baudy, Giverny, France
- 1997 Extraordinary Journey, Teodora Art Gallery, Toronto
- 1996 An Evening in the Eastend, Teodora Art Gallery, Toronto
- 1995 Galerie Company, Paris, France 1993 Schieder & Assoc., Toronto 1988-93 Various Solo Shows

== Museum exhibitions ==
Barbara's work has been shown in the following museum exhibitions:

- 2007 The Lindsay Gallery, Lindsay, Ontario
- 2005 Vernon Art Gallery, Vernon, B.C
- 2004 Glynhurst Art Gallery, Brantford, Ontario
- 2004 Temiskaming Art Gallery, Extraordinary Journey, Haileybury

== Museum collections ==
Barbara's work can be found in the following museum collections:

- Museum of Contemporary Canadian Art, Toronto
- The Robert McLaughlin Gallery, Oshawa
- University College, University of Toronto
- Art Gallery of Lethbridge, Lethbridge, Alberta
- Art Gallery of Mississauga
- Art Gallery of Peel, Brampton
- Baycrest Centre, Toronto
- Mt. Sinai Hospital, Toronto
- Princess Margaret Hospital, Toronto

== Selected collections ==
- HH General Sheikh Mohammed Bin Rashid Al Maktoum
- Vice President and Prime Minister of the UAE and Ruler of Dubai
- Cee Cee Holdings, Dubai, UAE
- Royal Collection, Sharjah, UAE
- Compass, Dubai, UAE
- Designdivision, Dubai, UAE
- Emirates Tower Hotel, Dubai, UAE
- Eytzinger Gold, Schwabach, Germany
- Ghandour Building, Beirut, Lebanon
- Bernstein Hounsfield & Assoc., London, England
- Cannex Financial Inc., Toronto
- Danson, Zucker & Connelly, Toronto
- Electric Light Company, London, England
- Lever Brothers, Toronto
- Saatchi & Saatchi, Compton Hayhurst, (Canada) Ltd.
- Teck Corporation, Vancouver, B.C.
- Union Carbide, Toronto

== Group exhibitions ==
Barbara's work has been part of the following group exhibitions:

- 2000 Bait Muzna Gallery, Muscat, Sultanate of Oman
- 1999 NOT the Royal Academy Show, London, England
- 1999 Royal Academy Summer Show, selected but not hung, London, England
- 1999 Pratt & Whitney, Invited Artist, Mississauga, Ontario, Canada
- 1999 Teodora Art Gallery, Toronto, Ontario, Canada
- 1998 Majlis Gallery, Dubai, UAE
- 1998 Teodora Art Gallery, Toronto, Ontario, Canada
- 1998 Royal Academy Summer Show, Selected but not hung, London, England
- 1998 NOT the Royal Academy Show, Salon des Refuses, London, England
- 1997 Art Expo '97, Teodora Art Gallery, New York, United States
- 1997 THE ART & TECHNOLOGY CIRCUS, Audart, New York, United States
- 1997 The Majlis Gallery, Dubai, UAE.
- 1996 "GIFTS FROM THE PERMANENT COLLECTION", Art Gallery of North York
- 1996 "TNT", Audart Gallery, New York, United States
- 1996 Miami Art Fair, Miami, Florida (Teodora Art Gallery)
- 1995 A.C.I. (juried) Virtuosity Art Fair, New York, N.Y. Bau-Xi Art Gallery
- 1995 Teodora Art Gallery
- 1994 Schieder & Associates Gallery, Toronto, Ontario, Canada
- 1993 Schieder & Associates Gallery, Toronto, Ontario, Canada
- 1992 John B. Aird Gallery, Toronto, Ontario, Canada
- 1992 Art Contemporain du Canada, Adar Tajan, Paris, France
- 1992 Kenneith Gallery, Sarnia, Ontario, Canada
- 1990 Sarnia Public Gallery, (Juried), Sarnia, Ontario, Canada
- 1990 Peel Regional Art Gallery, (Juried), Brampton, Ontario, Canada
- 1989 Latcham Gallery, (Juried), Stouffville, Ontario, Canada
- 1988 Bonnie Kagan Gallery, Toronto, Ontario, Canada

== Commissions ==
McGivern has been commissioned by the following companies:

- Swarovski Crystals, Dubai, UAE
- Emirates Tower Hotel, Dubai, UAE
- JL Albright Venture Partners, Toronto, Ontario, Canada
- ArtWorks, Dubai, UAE
- Frayland Consulting and Interiors, Dubai, UAE
- Dellwood Consultancy, Dubai, UAE
- Unesco, Christmas cards 2003–2004, Snecma Moteurs, CDC IXIS Securities
- Matrix Hotel, Edmonton, Alberta, Canada
- Luigi Malones, Dublin, Ireland

== Auctions ==
Barbara's work has been auctioned by the following:

- 2013 Contemporary Canadian Art, Heffler Fine Art, Toronto, ON, Canada
- 2009 The Arts Club, Bonham's, London, England
- 2009 Bonham's, Toronto, ON, Canada
- 2006 The Arabian Horse, Christie's, Dubai, UAE
- 1993 Art Contemporain du Canada, Ader Tajan, Paris, France
