= Regulatory crime control =

The idea of regulatory crime control is to reduce and control crime. Many factors can make a place or area a victim of criminal activity. John and Emily Eck, two primary scholars that work within the area of regulatory crime control, explain how places can either create crime opportunities or crime barriers (2012). Eck also defines the two types of regulatory crime control strategies as ends-based and means-based. He states that means-based strategies focus on the use of different procedures and technologies, while ends-based strategies concentrate on the overall outcome (2012). Another primary scholar, Graham Farrell, discusses how repeat victimisation is becoming an important area for policing and crime control (Farrell, n.d.).

== Critical developments ==
Regulatory crime control involves reducing crime within a specific place or area; specifically, risky facilities give contingency for prevention. In order to regulate crime control and take preventive measures, one must develop different concepts that are aimed to helping deter crime (2007). These different concepts include crime hotspots, crime generators and crime attractors. Hot spots are places with high crime rates. Crime generators have high crime in places because they are generally really busy and crime attractors are places that consist of many crime targets and not much protection provided for these targets at these places (2007). When referring to the two types of strategies of regulatory crime control, Eck goes into more detail about ends-based strategies having policies that are differentially influenced by the costs of production among the competing firms. In contrast, means-based strategies have policies that have firms that are all subject to the same commands (2012). Ends-based strategies are not likely to be the primary regulatory instrument when dealing with crimes that are rare or serious; however, means-based strategies are more useful for those types of crimes (2012).

== Empirical support ==
Some broad policy change examples would include the Chula Vista police department motel project and SMART policing team in Oakland, California. First, the Chula Vista police department motel project is an example of the effect of size on risky facilities. When the police department looked at all of the locations of motels, they were located in high crime areas. Even the motels that did not attract high levels of crime were located in high crime areas. According to John E. Eck, Ronald V. Clarke and Rob T. Guerette, one can look at the motels in close proximity to each other as being problematic to crime occurring at those motels (2007). Some of the offender explanations could be, if the people committing crimes in the low crime facilities traveled to reach the motels, then proximity to offender populations could be some of the explanation (2007). An offender explanation could also be how different offenders are attracted to different facilities. Some facilities might have features that could help offenders, but not be useful to other offenders (2007). According to Karin Schmerler, author of problem of disorder at budget motels guidebook, guests and visitors who live within thirty miles of a motel cause more problems than tourists or business travellers (2005). Although criminal activity usually can be explained through targets and offenders, the place managers can have a role in explaining high crime facilities (2007). Place management directly effects how the offender and target each interact at the location (2007). There can be more than one reason why these specific motels in these areas were victims of criminal activity.

Second, the SMART policing team located in Oakland, California, aimed toward reducing drug activity and cleaning up the environment at the places with problems. Lorraine G. Mazerolle reported the results of a randomised field study conducted in Oakland, CA. The study consisted of civil remedies were used to target drug, crime and disorder problems in 50 experimental places (1998). Mazerolle explains that Oakland decided to put together a Beat Health program, which is a program that is used to amplify social conditions and seeks to control drug, crime and disorder problems and restore order (1998). The police began by visiting nuisance locations and making working relations with citizens, apartment managers, landlords and business owners living or working both at the address that was a target (1998). The table below is from Mazerolle's reported results of the characteristics of the study locations. Apparently, most of the study sites were rental properties and twelve of the experimental sites were owner occupied. Drug dealing was reported as a very big problem in both control and experimental studies (1998). Before the start of this experiment the control and experimental sites had similar levels of arrest action (1998).

The Beat Health investigation did find some difficulty in solving some of the problems they were encountering. According to Mazerolle, the investigation found some problems within a main buildings’ parking lot which is located behind the building, shared with another apartment building. Apparently, about two blocks around the buildings were an active drug market that consisted of young teens that would lookout on rooftops (1999). In deciding whether or not the Beat Health program worked with their regulatory crime control efforts, the answer would be that there were positive outcomes. Mazerolle explains that after the study was done there was evidence of a decrease in signs of disorder, decrease in selling of drugs, and an increase in civil behavior in public places, according to the social observation data that was analysed (1999). The results show a positive outlook on regulatory crime control and how the different methods can be used to deter crime from different areas.

== Criticisms ==
According to the Handbook of Policing, there have been a few concerns about crime control practices that have come up over the years, such as miscarriages of justice, abuse of power and erosions of civil liberties. Miscarriages of justice concerns are the arresting and charging the wrong person. Abuse of power involves the corruption that can be within the criminal justice system. Erosions of civil liberties are concerns about invasive methods of investigation.

== Crime prevention implications ==
Crime prevention is used throughout regulatory crime control. Eck explains that, "The fact that crime is heavily concentrated on particular people, places and things has important implications for prevention" (226, 2007). Use of different strategies to deter crime from happening within a facility or area helps prevent criminal activities from occurring at the particular place or area. Eck states that places that have criminal activity can partly be the place managements fault because of their particular place management practices (2012). Eck and Guerette explain that government strategies should hold place managers accountable for crime and disorder at their locations to reduce crime (2012). If place managers make the effort to reduce criminal activity within their establishment, then they become a very important crime prevention implication. Regulatory crime control, involving places, can also be prevented by focusing on place-based prevention when examining neighbourhoods and large geographical areas.
