= Jeremy Travis =

American academic administrator

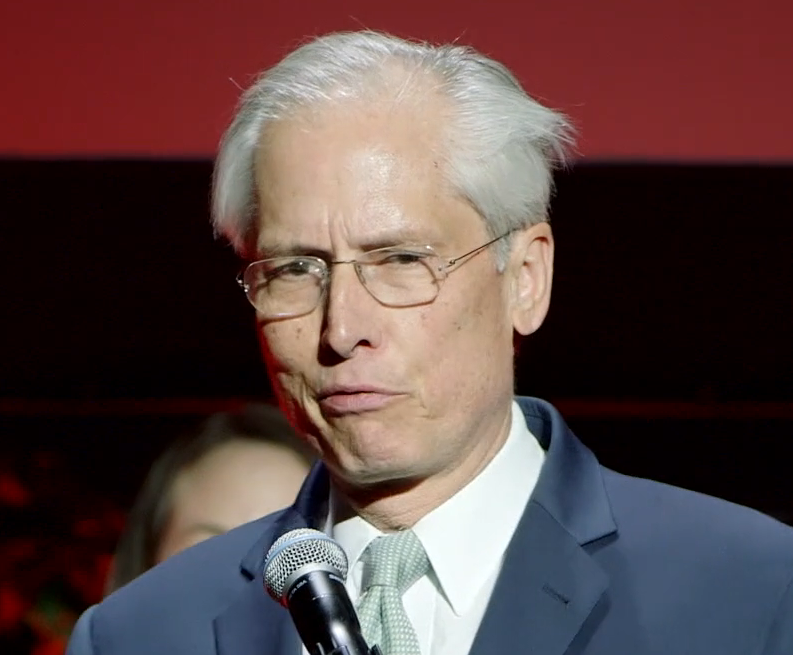

4th President of the John Jay College of Criminal Justice
- In office August 16, 2004 – October 25, 2016
- Preceded by: Gerald W. Lynch
- Succeeded by: Karol Mason

Personal details
- Born: July 31, 1948 (age 78)
- Education: Yale University (BA); New York University (MPA, JD)

Jeremy Travis (born July 31, 1948) is an American academic administrator who served as the fourth president of John Jay College of Criminal Justice, a senior college of the City University of New York, starting on August 16, 2004. On October 25, 2016, Travis announced that he would step down from his position as president the next year. In August 2017, he joined the Arnold Ventures LLC as Senior Vice President of Criminal Justice.

== Education ==
Travis received his B.A., cum laude, in American Studies from Yale College in 1970, and was the recipient of the C. Douglas Green Memorial Prize in History and the Saybrook Fellows Prize. He received his M.P.A. from New York University's Robert F. Wagner School of Public Service in 1977, and his J.D. from New York University School of Law in 1982. He was elected to the Order of the Coif, and was a member of the New York University Law Review. He was also the recipient of the John Norton Pomeroy Prize for academic achievement and the Arthur Garfield Hays Fellowship in Civil Liberties.

== Career ==
Travis began his career working as a legal services assistant for the Legal Aid Society from 1971 to 1973. He worked for the Vera Institute of Justice from 1973 to 1977, where he managed demonstration programs on bail reform and victim-witness assistance. He then directed the New York City Criminal Justice Agency from 1977 to 1979.

Early in his career, Travis served as law clerk to then-U.S. Court of Appeals Judge Ruth Bader Ginsburg (1982–83) and was the Marden and Marshall Fellow in Criminal Law at New York University School of Law (1983–84). He was appointed Special Counsel to the New York City Police Commissioner (1984–86), where he developed a new recruitment program, the Police Cadet Corps, to attract more college-educated and racially diverse candidates as police officers.

Travis served as a special advisor to then-New York City Mayor Edward Koch from 1986 to 1989. He has also served as Chief Counsel to the U.S. House Judiciary Subcommittee on Criminal Justice, (1990), before becoming the Deputy Commissioner for Legal Matters in the New York City Police Department from 1990 to 1994, where he created the Civil Enforcement Initiative, a program that combined civil and criminal remedies to address local crime conditions.

Nominated by President Clinton and confirmed by the Senate, Travis served as the Director of the National Institute of Justice from 1994 to 2000, where he established major research initiatives to assess crime trends and bolster research on anti-crime and counter-terrorism strategies. From 2000 until becoming president of John Jay College in 2004, he was a Senior Fellow at the Urban Institute's Justice Policy Center, where he created a national research program on prisoner reentry.

Travis has served as Chair of the Committee on Law and Justice of the National Research Council (NRC) of the National Academies. He also served as Chair of the NRC Committee on the Causes and Consequences of High Rates of Incarceration, which produced a landmark report recommending significant reductions in the nation's prison population. He is Vice Chair of the Board of Trustees of the Urban Institute. In 2009, President Travis served as Chair of the Task Force on Transforming Juvenile Justice, appointed by New York State Governor David A. Paterson, which recommended significant changes to the state's juvenile justice system.

In 2016, Travis was named a member of the Independent Commission on New York City Criminal Justice and Incarceration Reform by the former New York State Chief Judge Jonathan Lippman. He was also named a member of the U.S. Partnership on Mobility from Poverty by the Urban Institute. In 2015, he testified before the Task Force on 21st Century Policing created by President Barack H. Obama.

Travis has taught courses on criminal justice, public policy, history, and law at Yale College, New York University Wagner Graduate School of Public Service, New York Law School, George Washington University, and John Jay College of Criminal Justice.

== College administration ==
Under Travis's leadership, John Jay has been transformed into a senior college offering a rigorous undergraduate liberal arts program coupled with an array of cutting-edge professional studies. Travis also led the formation of the Justice Academy, an educational partnership involving John Jay and six CUNY community colleges. In 2012, John Jay joined the Macaulay Honors College of CUNY.

John Jay now has the most diverse student body among CUNY's senior colleges and enrolls the largest veteran population in CUNY, with significant student services and resources. Travis also partnered with area corporations to establish the Veterans Corporate Roundtable to support career opportunities for veteran students. Under his leadership, freshman enrollment has increased by half, full-time faculty have increased by one-third, and external funding for faculty research has tripled. John Jay now offers 31 undergraduate majors, 13 master's degree programs, and houses two nationally recognized doctoral programs. John Jay Online was launched in 2014, offering several master's degrees and advanced certificates online. He introduced the ACE program to support student success, the first at a CUNY senior college. He initiated pipeline programs in partnership with NYPD, Department of Corrections, and other public organizations.

The Pre-Law Institute (PLI) and Program for Research Initiatives in Science and Math (PRISM) were created as part of his vision for supporting student success. Travis was instrumental in establishing nationally known centers at John Jay, including the Prisoner Reentry Institute and the Prison to College Pipeline (P2CP), National Network for Safe Communities, Center for Media, Crime and Justice, and more recently, the Institute for Innovation in Prosecution and the Research Network on Misdemeanor Justice. He also brought the Center for Policing Equity to John Jay.

John Jay's 625,000-square-foot new building was constructed and opened in 2011, more than doubling the size of the campus. The building created a cohesive instructional environment and integrated college functions into a unified city block, creating an academic city within a city, as a true urban campus. The building also houses a September 11 memorial for the 67 John Jay alumni who died as a result of the attack.

The college completed its first capital campaign, which raised $50 million, in 2014, and launched its next campaign of $75 million publicly in 2016, of which nearly $50 million has been raised so far under Travis's leadership.

Travis announced that he would step down from his position as president in August 2017. He was appointed as university professor at the Graduate Center of the City University of New York and will serve as a Senior Fellow at Harvard University's Kennedy School of Government. He will continue to serve as co-director of the Misdemeanor Justice Project and co-chair of the advisory board for the Institute for Innovation in Prosecution at John Jay College. He will also continue to work on issues of mass incarceration, prisoner reentry, crime policy and criminal justice reforms.

== Research interests ==
Travis' research interests include the challenge of mass incarceration and the reintegration of released prisoners into society, the latter subject having served as the basis of his book But They All Come Back: Facing the Challenges of Prisoner Reentry, published in 2005.

While at the National Institute of Justice, he established large government initiatives to assess crime trends, evaluate federal anti-crime efforts, advance forensic science, and bolster research on counterterrorism strategies.

Among his many published writings, including book chapters, articles and monographs on constitutional law, criminal law and criminal justice policy, Travis co-edited (with Bruce Western and Steve Redburn) the 2014 National Research Council report "The Growth of Incarceration in the United States: Exploring Causes and Consequences," which found only a slight relationship between incarceration and lower crime rates and recommended a significant reduction in incarceration rates. He also co-edited two books on prisoner reentry and the impact of incarceration.

== Books ==
Travis, J., Western, B., Redburn, S. (Eds.) (2014). The Growth of Incarceration in the United States: Exploring Causes and Consequences. Washington, D.C.: The National Academies Press.

Travis, J. (2005). But They All Come Back: Facing the Challenges of Prisoner Reentry. Washington, D.C.: Urban Institute Press. Travis, J., Visher, C. (Eds.) (2005). Prisoner Reentry and Crime in America. New York. Cambridge University Press.

Travis, J., Waul, M. (Eds.) (2003). Prisoners Once Removed: The Effect of Incarceration and Reentry on Children, Families, and Communities. Washington, D.C.: Urban Institute Press.

== Honors and awards ==
Travis has received the Ellis Island Medal of Honor by the National Ethnic Coalition of Organizations (NECO), the Amalia Betanzos Distinguished Service Award by Fedcap Rehabilitation Services for his service to New York City, and the Distinguished Achievement Award in Evidence-based Crime Policy at George Mason University in 2014. Travis was the recipient of the Maud Booth Correctional Services Award by Volunteers of America in 2012, as well as the International Corrections and Prisons Association Research Award in 2007.

He received the Donald Cressey Award by the National Council on Crime and Delinquency in 2006, the Margaret Mead Award from the International Community Corrections Association in 2003, and the Gerhard O.W. Mueller Award from the Academy of Criminal Justice Sciences.

== Speeches, testimonies, and op-eds ==
- A Needed Reprieve for Young N.Y. Men: Police Enforcement Actions are Way, Way Down
- Reversing the Realities of Mass Incarceration: The Role of American Business

–Keynote Address at the 2016 Social Entrepreneurship Leadership Forum, April 22, 2016

- What We Learned From German Prisons Op-ed by Jeremy Travis and Nicholas Turner, The New York Times, August 6, 2015
- What About the Children? Assessing the Ripple Effects of Mass Incarceration

–Center for the Study of Race and Race Relations, Levin College of Law, University of Florida, March 25, 2015

- Testimony before the Task Force on 21st Century Policing created by President Barack H. Obama. Panel on The Future of Community Policing, in Washington DC, 2015.
- Reflections on the NAS Report: What Are the Prospects For Reducing the US Prison Population?

–Hoffinger Colloquium of the Center for Research on Crime and Justice, New York University School of Law, February 23, 2015

- Assessing the Burden of Crime and the Criminal Sanction: A Public Health Perspective on Critical Issues in Criminal Justice

–Mailman School of Public Health Columbia University, September 19, 2013

- Testimony before the National Association of Criminal Defense Lawyers Task Force on Restoration of Rights and Status After Conviction, Turning the Tide: Victories and Opportunities in Criminal Justice Reform, in New York, NY, 2013.
- Restoring College Education to the Nation's Prisons

–Keynote Speech at the Conference on Education for All by the Department of Education and the Ford Foundation, April 29, 2013

- Summoning the Superheroes: Harnessing Science and Passion to Create A More Effective and Humane Response to Crime

–Keynote Address on The Future of Crime Policy at the National Press Club, October 11, 2011

- Building Communities with Justice: Overcoming the Tyranny of the Funnel

– Keynote Address at the Marquette Law School, February 20, 2009

- Race, Crime and Justice: A Fresh Look at Old Questions

– Keynote Address at The New York City Bar Association/2008 Orison S. Marden Lecture, March 19, 2008
