= Anthony Braga =

American criminologist

- Born: 1969 (age 56–57)
- Education: University of Massachusetts (B.A., 1991); Rutgers University (M.A., 1993; Ph.D., 1997); Harvard University (M.P.A., 2002)
- Awards: American Society of Criminology's Vollmer Award (2021); Criminology Fellow (2016) International Association of Chiefs of Police's Research Excellence (2011); Department of Justice's Community Partnerships (2009)
- Scientific career
- Fields: Criminology
- Workplaces: Northeastern University, John F. Kennedy School of Government, Rutgers University, University of Pennsylvania
- Thesis: Solving violent crime problems: an evaluation of the Jersey City Police Department's pilot program to control violent places (1997)

Anthony Allan Braga (born 1969) is an American criminologist and the Jerry Lee Professor of Criminology at the University of Pennsylvania. Braga is also the Director of the Crime and Justice Policy Lab at the University of Pennsylvania. He previously held faculty and senior research positions at Harvard University, Northeastern University, Rutgers University, and the University of California at Berkeley. Braga is a member of the federal monitor team overseeing the reforms to New York City Police Department (NYPD) policies, training, supervision, auditing, and handling of complaints and discipline regarding stops and frisks and trespass enforcement.

== Research ==
Braga's research focuses on enhancing fairness and effectiveness in policing. With colleagues, he has completed randomized controlled trials testing the impacts of deploying body worn cameras on police officers in Boston, Las Vegas, and New York City. These studies generally suggest that the placement of body cameras improve the civility of police-citizen encounters. He has also conducted randomized experiments showing that procedurally-just police encounters can improve civilian perceptions of police legitimacy. Finally, he has completed descriptive research studies examining extralegal factors associated with racial disparities in police contacts with civilians.

His research has examined the stability and concentration of crime at small hot spot locations in cities. For instance, he led a study showing that 74 percent of shootings were persistently concentrated in just 5 percent of street blocks over a twenty-nine-year period in Boston. Braga has conducted a systematic review of hot spots policing experiments and quasi-experiments that shows concentrating police resource in crime hot spots can reduce crime without displacing crime to nearby locations. He also led a randomized controlled trial that found police efforts to modify the characteristics of crime places (greening vacant lots, securing abandoned buildings, improving lighting, and other situational remedies) generated stronger crime control gains relative to increased misdemeanor arrests.

Braga has been influential in the development of focused deterrence strategies to control serious violence. These strategies attempt to reduce serious crime and violence by changing offender behavior through a blended set of law enforcement, community mobilization, and social service actions. He was part of the Boston Gun Project working group that developed the well-known Operation Ceasefire strategy in the 1990s and worked with the Boston Police Department to implement a reinvigorated Ceasefire program in the mid-2000s. Braga completed a systematic review of controlled evaluations that suggest focused deterrence programs reduce crime, but the review noted the rigor of focused deterrence evaluations needs to be improved. Braga has also conducted studies on illegal gun trafficking in Boston, Chicago, and New York City. These studies generally show that high-risk people, such as gang members and drug sellers, acquire guns through illegal diversions from legal firearms commerce.

== Honors and awards ==
Anthony Braga is a Fellow of the American Society of Criminology and the 2021 recipient of its August Vollmer Award recognizing outstanding contributions to the field of criminal justice. He is also a past President and Fellow of the Academy of Experimental Criminology and the 2014 recipient its Joan McCord Award recognizing his contributions to the advancement of experimental criminology. Beyond academic recognition, he has also received multiple awards from practitioner organizations such as the 2011 International Association of Chiefs of Police Excellence in Law Enforcement Research Award, 2010 U.S. Department of Justice Project Safe Neighborhood Award for Outstanding Service by a Research Partner, and the 2009 U.S. Attorney General's Award for Outstanding Contribution to Community Partnerships and Public Safety.
