= Herman Goldstein =

American criminologist (1931–2020)

- Born: December 8, 1931; New London, Connecticut, U.S.
- Died: January 24, 2020 (aged 88); Madison, Wisconsin, U.S.
- Education: University of Pennsylvania
- Known for: Problem-oriented policing
- Children: 3
- Awards: Stockholm Prize
- Scientific career
- Fields: Criminal law
- Institutions: University of Wisconsin Law School

Herman Goldstein (December 8, 1931 – January 24, 2020) was an American criminologist and legal scholar known for developing the problem-oriented policing model. He was Professor at the University of Wisconsin Law School, where he began teaching in 1964. He previously worked as an assistant to the then-superintendent of the Chicago Police Department, O.W. Wilson. In 2018, he was awarded the Stockholm Prize in Criminology in honor of his research on policing.

Goldstein died in January 2020 at the age of 88. His funeral took place at Beth Israel Center in Madison, WI.
