= Problem-oriented policing =

Strategy of policing

Problem-oriented policing (POP), coined by University of Wisconsin–Madison professor Herman Goldstein, is a policing strategy that involves the identification and analysis of specific crime and disorder problems, in order to develop effective response strategies. POP requires police to identify and target underlying problems that can lead to crime. Goldstein suggested it as an improvement on the reactive, incident-driven "standard model of policing".

Goldstein's 1979 model was expanded in 1987 by John E. Eck and William Spelman into the Scanning, Analysis, Response, and Assessment (SARA) model for problem-solving. This strategy places more emphasis on research and analysis as well as crime prevention and the engagement of public and private organizations in the reduction of community problems.

A systematic review of this model, based on 34 randomized control trials and quasi-experimental studies, found that problem-oriented policing is effective at reducing crime and disorder, but had a limited effect on police legitimacy and fear of crime. There is also the risk of overreach, corruption, and abuse of authority, when officers interfere before crimes have actually occurred.

== Criticism ==
Problem-oriented policing can have some unintended consequences, including displacement of the problem from its origins. The majority of problem-oriented policing projects fail to investigate displacement. Law enforcement is generally satisfied to achieve a crime reduction in the targeted area and may be less concerned if crime is displaced outside their jurisdiction. However, assessing and understanding potential displacement effects can help ensure the effectiveness of problem-oriented policing. Response to criticism of POP based on this unintended consequence has been challenged: a systematic review published in 2011 argued that while displacement is viewed as a negative consequence of crime prevention efforts, it can provide benefits.

Another criticism comes from a particular challenge to many policing approaches: trust. If a community has no trust in law enforcement, then law enforcement and the community will have friction. As difficult as it is often for police officers to obtain "buy-in" within, it is often even more difficult to convince people outside the police department, such as community partners, to carry out specific tasks faithfully and properly without a negative inference of its inadequacy in satisfying the expectations of the masses.

== Evaluations ==
Michael Scott's 20-year retrospective concludes: "After 20 years, problem-oriented policing has demonstrated an internal logic that has been successfully applied at the project level and remains a promising approach for the foreseeable future."

== See also ==
- Community oriented policing
- Crime displacement
- Broken windows theory
- Intelligence-led policing
- Evidence-based policing
- Peelian principles
- Neighbourhood policing team
