= John Jay College of Criminal Justice =

College of the City University of New York City, New York

Coordinates: 40.7703°N 73.9883°W

- Former name: College of Police Science of The City University of New York (1964–1967)
- Motto: "Fierce Advocates for Justice."
- Type: Public college
- Established: 1964; 62 years ago
- Academic affiliations: City University of New York
- Endowment: $7.2 million
- President: Karol V. Mason
- Faculty: 1,100+ (includes adjuncts)
- Students: 13,921 (fall 2022)
- Undergraduates: 13,309
- Postgraduates: 1,740
- Location: New York, New York, U.S.
- Campus: Urban
- Colors: Blue & gold
- Nickname: Bloodhounds
- Sporting affiliations: NCAA Division III; CUNYAC, ECAC, MAC
- Mascot: Bloodhound
- Website: jjay.cuny.edu

The John Jay College of Criminal Justice (John Jay) is a public college focused on criminal justice located in New York City. It is a senior college of the City University of New York (CUNY). John Jay was founded as the only liberal arts college with a criminal justice and forensic focus in the United States.

== History ==
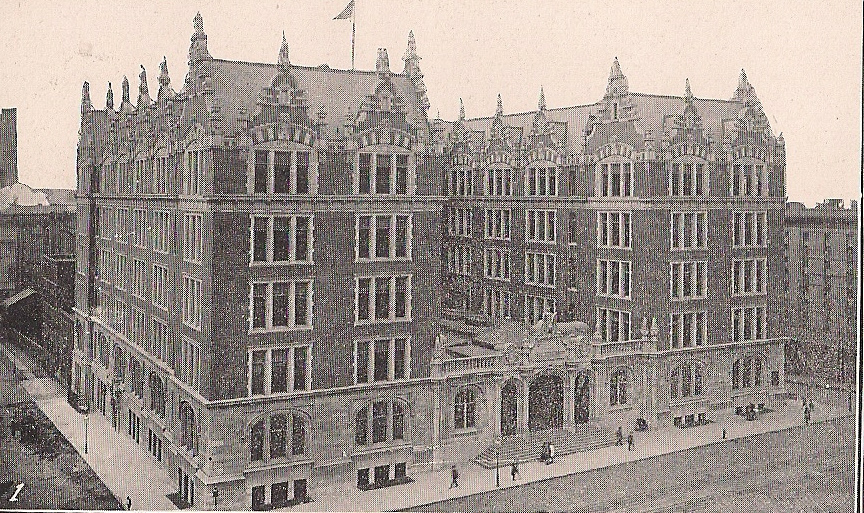
Haaren Hall in the early 20th century. Prior to the acquisition by John Jay, it was Haaren High School.

=== Founding ===
In 1964, a committee convened by the Board of Higher Education recommended the establishment of an independent, degree-granting school of police science. The College of Police Science (COPS) of the City University of New York was subsequently founded and admitted its first class in September 1965. In 1967, the school was renamed John Jay College of Criminal Justice to reflect broader education objectives. The school's namesake, John Jay (1745–1829), was the first chief justice of the United States Supreme Court and a Founding Father of the United States. Jay was a native of New York City and served as governor of New York State.

Classes were originally held at the Police Academy on East 20th Street. Leonard E. Reisman served as college president from 1964 to 1970, succeeded by Donald Riddle, president from 1970 to 1975.

=== Era of protests and disputes ===
In the spring of 1970, after President Nixon announced that the Cambodian Campaign would be extended, the college held two "heated" teach-ins about the conflict. Many other college campuses were home to student strikes across the nation. On May 7, 1970, the faculty voted 52–39 in favor of closing the college in protest of President Nixon's handling of the Vietnam War and the killing of students by National Guardsmen at Kent State University and Jackson State College. But the closing of John Jay College would ultimately be up to its students, the faculty decided. At an impassioned student meeting, the final vote was 865–791 in favor of keeping the college open.

In the summer of 1970, Professor Abe Blumberg made some criticisms of the FBI and the Director J. Edgar Hoover in a graduate course on the sociology of law. One of his students, an FBI agent named Jack Shaw, examined the agency's role in American society in his master's thesis, granting that some of Blumberg's criticisms may have been valid. His paper found its way to Hoover's hands, who ordered that Shaw resign and told President Riddle that as long as Blumberg (a tenured professor) remained on the faculty, no FBI agents would attend John Jay. Riddle defended Blumberg, citing academic freedom. After Hoover's death in 1972, FBI agents began to enroll again at the college. The FBI later paid former agent Shaw $13,000 in back pay.

=== Open admissions ===
CUNY's open admissions Program came into effect in the fall of 1970. Adopting the Open Admissions policy meant that the university would now provide a place for any high school graduate who desired to attend. Across CUNY, student enrollment ballooned. At John Jay, undergraduates numbered 2,600 in 1969; 4,400 in 1970; 6,700 in 1972; and 8,600 in 1973. The size of the faculty grew by over 200% between 1970 and 1972. Moreover, the policy brought many more "civilian" (non-law enforcement) students to the college. The school's massive and sudden growth had a profound effect. More of the college's budget went toward remedial programs to help transition underprepared freshmen. In addition, the college broadened its curriculum, expanding into liberal arts. Majors including English, Math, American Studies, and Chemistry were introduced during this period in the early 1970s. The SEEK program developed during this time as well, supporting students from underprivileged backgrounds who showed academic promise.

President Riddle resigned to become chancellor of the University of Illinois at Chicago. From 1975 to 1977, Gerald W. Lynch served as acting president, and in 1977, he was sworn in as college president, a position he would hold until 2004.

As the school grew, its space constraints were felt, despite having acquired the Miles Shoe Building on West 59th Street (North Hall) in 1969. In 1973, John Jay rented the former 20th Century Fox building (South Hall) a few blocks from North Hall.

=== CUNY fiscal crisis of 1976 ===
In 1976, City University Board of Trustees threatened to shut down the college during a time of fiscal crisis for CUNY and New York City as a whole. Throughout the campaign to "save John Jay," the faculty and administration united to advocate the sentiment voiced by President Lynch in a memo: "John Jay can contribute to the city as a unique resource to help solve the problems of crime, public productivity, manpower needs, and budget management." After weeks of turmoil, the college decided to trim its budget to remain independent rather than merge with Baruch College. On April 5, the Board of Higher Education voted to preserve John Jay. Though the budget cuts were still painful, the college community's efforts were successful.

=== Curricular expansion ===
In 1980, at President Lynch's urging, the college established its first doctorate program, offering a PhD in Criminal Justice on the heels of several Master's programs. In the next two decades of Lynch's presidency, enrollment and the faculty grew, the school's external activities expanded, and its curriculum continued to evolve. John Jay continued to pursue an approach to education more attuned to the liberal arts. The college supported more curricular cultural diversity, establishing an Ethnic Studies track and strengthening its Women's Studies program. Between 1985 and 1988, as faculty pursued more research opportunities, the amount of grant money given to John Jay faculty increased by over 500%.

Again, the college felt the constraints of space, and in 1986 acquired Haaren Hall (formerly DeWitt Clinton High School) across the intersection from North Hall. After renovation, Haaren Hall was opened to students in 1988. The new hall included a spacious two-level library, christened Lloyd Sealy Library in 1991 for Lloyd Sealy, the first African-American Associate Professor of Law and Police Science.

=== CUNY fiscal crisis of 1995 ===
In 1995, CUNY suffered another fiscal crisis when Governor George Pataki announced a $162 million cut in state financing for the university. The CUNY board of trustees declared a state of financial emergency. By June, in response to the threat of budget cuts, CUNY had adopted a stricter admissions policy for its senior colleges: students deemed unprepared for college would not be admitted, a departure from the 1970 Open Admissions program, in order to save money spent on remedial programs. The proposed $162 million in cuts was reduced to $102 million, which CUNY absorbed by increasing tuition by $750 and offering a retirement incentive plan for faculty. (In May 1996, a State Supreme Court justice ruled that CUNY misused their emergency financial authority to lay off professors, close departments, and cut remedial aid.)

=== Academic overhaul and campus expansion ===
On September 11, 2001, John Jay lost 67 alumni and students, many of them firefighters, in the World Trade Center attacks. The school resumed class on September 13, providing additional counseling for students, many of whom saw their studies and career aspirations in a new light. In September 2011, John Jay dedicated a memorial to the fallen members of its community who died on 9/11. The memorial, a large steel fragment from the World Trade Center ruins, was officially unveiled in September 2013.

In 1998, the New York State Legislature had approved a five-year capital budget of $352 million for the college to improve its facilities. The college continued to expand its campus as enrollment grew. The "New Building", a 13-story tower connected to Haaren Hall's west side, opened in 2011, dramatically increasing the college's square footage and adding green space to the campus.

John Jay joined the Macaulay Honors College, an advising program for top students, in September 2012. In December 2012, the college received its largest-ever donation: $5 million from adjunct professor and alumnus Andrew Shiva.

President Lynch retired in 2004, having headed the longest senior-level administration in City University of New York history. He was succeeded by Jeremy Travis, who was previously a senior fellow at the Justice Policy Center and had directed the National Institute of Justice. Travis retired in 2017. Karol Mason, former Assistant Attorney General, assumed the office of college president in August 2017.

== Academics ==
John Jay College of Criminal Justice is accredited by the Middle States Commission on Higher Education. The school is primarily known for its criminal justice studies, forensic psychology, and forensic science programs, supported by a liberal arts curriculum. The student-faculty ratio is 16:1, and the average freshman retention rate is 78%. The college offers a variety of in-person, online, and hybrid courses. There are a total of 1,100 faculty employed by the school, over one-third of which are full-time faculty members.

The college awards bachelor's, master's, and doctoral degrees, as well as certificates. The college discontinued issuing associate degrees in 2010. In 2014, John Jay College launched two completely online master's degrees and one online professional certificate.

=== Admissions ===
John Jay College of Criminal Justice had a 37% admission rate in its 2016 undergraduate admissions cycle.

=== Honors programs ===
John Jay College is a member of the selective Macaulay Honors College program, which awards academically gifted students with a full four-year tuition scholarship, specialized academic advisers, and an Opportunities Fund of $7,500, to be used toward academically enriching experiences. Students accepted into the program are deemed University Scholars and collaborate with other honors students across CUNY campuses.

=== Research ===
The college houses multiple research centers and institutes focused on crime and justice:

- Academy of Critical Incident Analysis
- Center for Crime Prevention and Control
- Center for Cybercrime Studies
- Center for International Human Rights
- Center on Media, Crime and Justice
- Center on Race, Crime and Justice
- Center on Terrorism
- Christian Regenhard Center for Emergency Response Studies
- CUNY Dispute Resolution Consortium
- Institute for Criminal Justice Ethics
- Prisoner Reentry Institute – studies prisoner reentry
- Research & Evaluation Center

== Student life ==
Undergraduate demographics as of Fall 2023
Race and ethnicity	Total
Hispanic	51%
Black	17%
White	14%
Asian	12%
International student	3%
Two or more races	2%
Economic diversity
Low-income (Note: The percentage of students who received an income-based federal Pell grant intended for low-income students.)	60%
Affluent (Note: The percentage of students who are a part of the American middle class at the bare minimum.)	40%

=== Athletics ===
College teams participate as a member of the National Collegiate Athletic Association's Division III. The Bloodhounds are a member of the City University of New York Athletic Conference (CUNYAC). The following sports are sponsored:

- Fall: Men's and Women's Soccer, Women's Volleyball, Women's Tennis, Men's and Women's Cross Country
- Winter: Men's and Women's Basketball, Women's Swimming, Rifle and Cheerleading
- Spring: Baseball, Softball, Men's Volleyball, and Men's Tennis

== Campus ==
The college consists of six buildings. It is located in Hell's Kitchen, Manhattan close to Central Park, Columbus Circle, Carnegie Hall and Lincoln Center.

The college's newest building, a 13-story, 625,000-square-foot (58,100 m^{2}) facility, opened in 2011 and occupies a full city block in midtown.

Known around campus as the "New Building" it has been recognized as an "overlooked architectural masterpiece" by The Real Deal, a leading New York City real estate news publication, which recently listed the building among the "ten best buildings to see in America" and one of the "coolest works of architecture in the country".

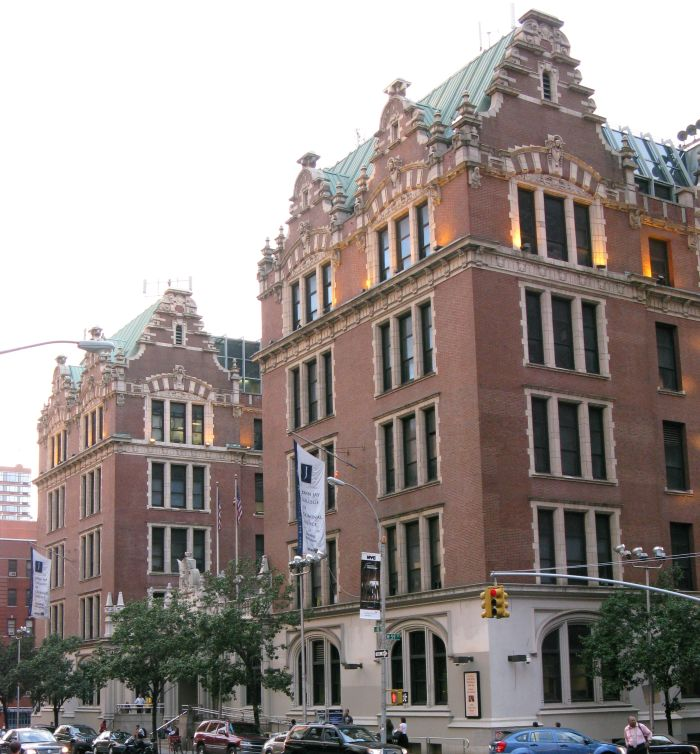
Haaren Hall

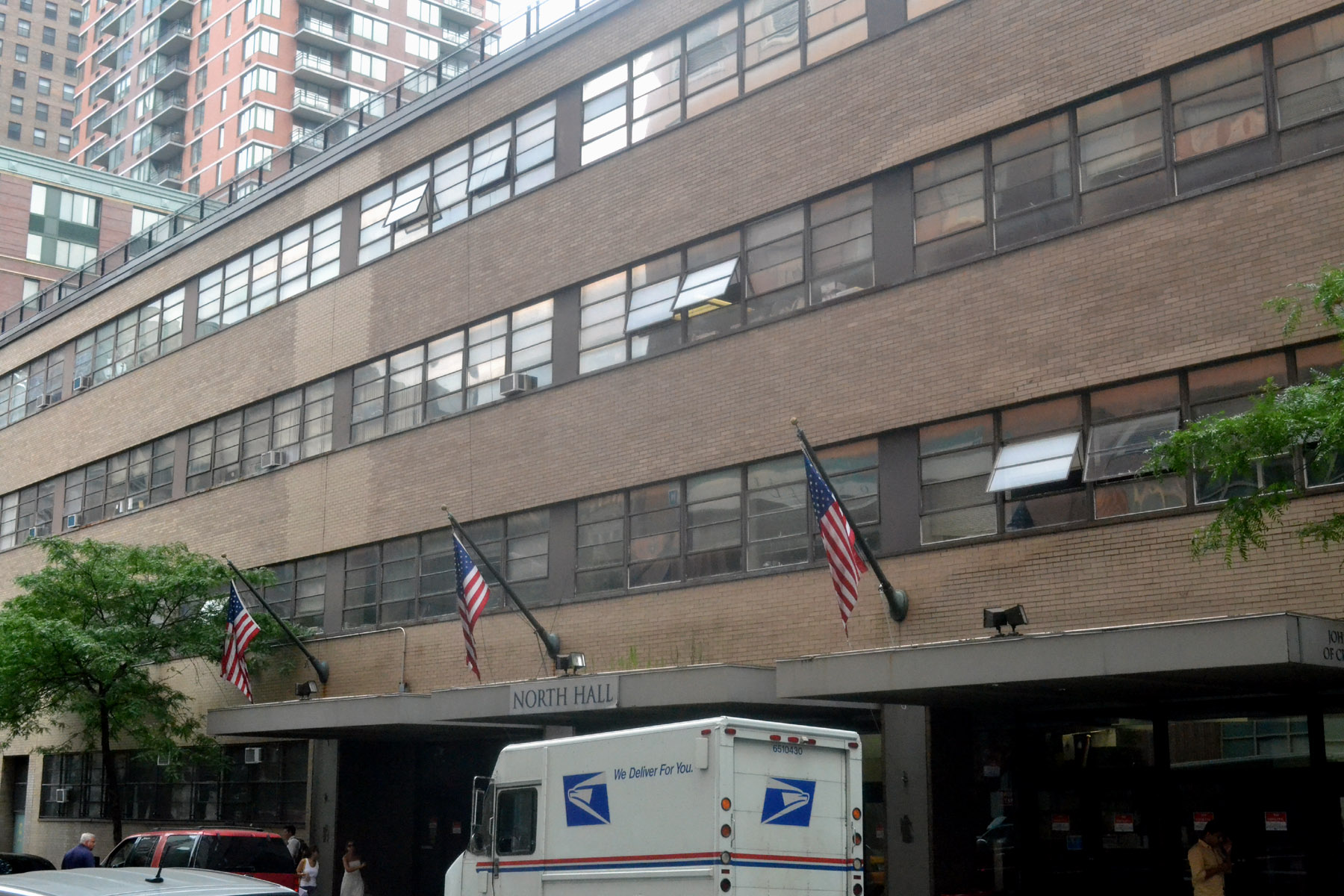
North Hall

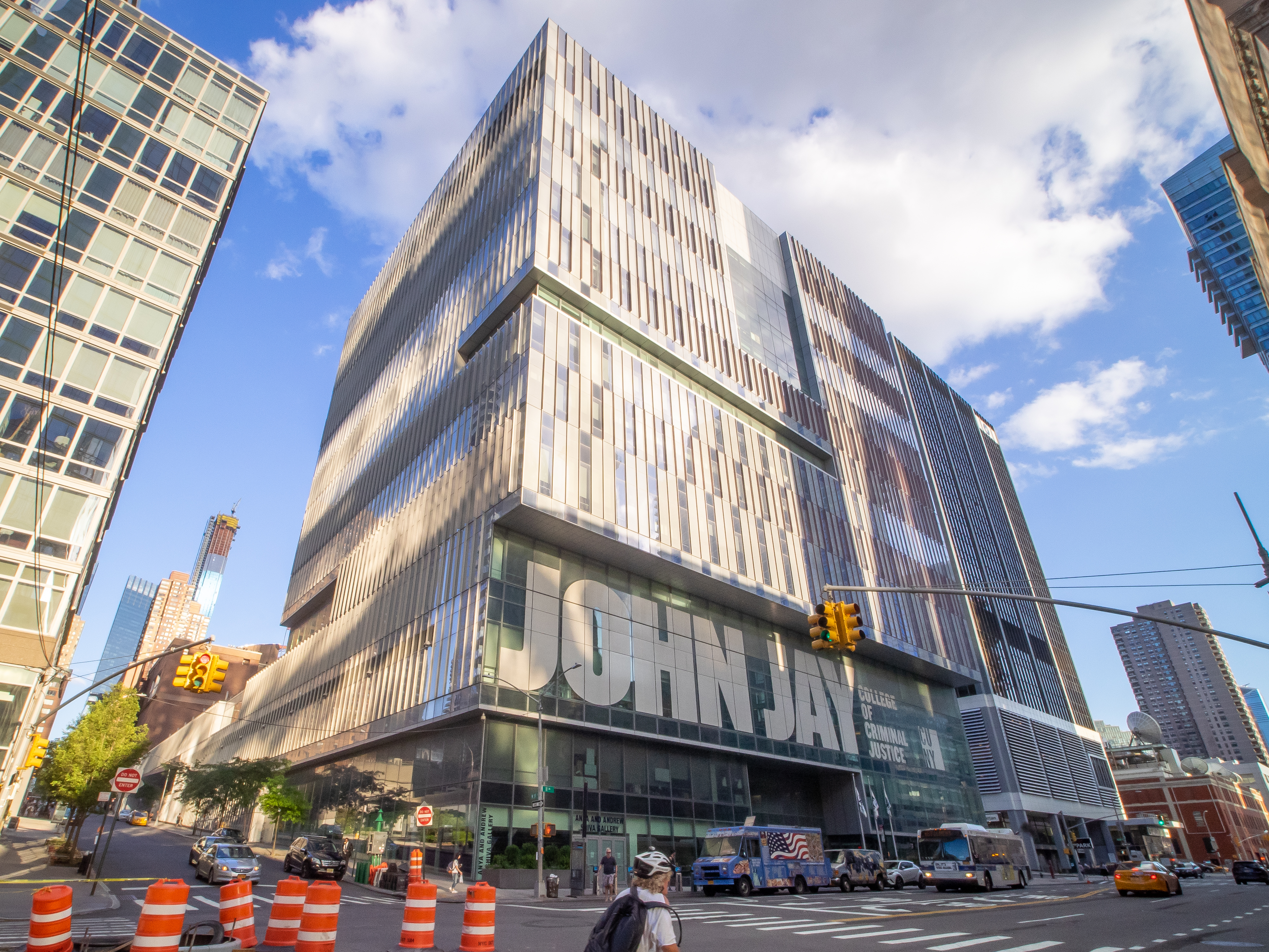
New Building

=== Haaren Hall ===
Haaren Hall – also known as the Tenth Avenue building or, simply, the T building – is the main campus building of John Jay. Located at 899 Tenth Avenue, it houses the majority of the administrative departments and classrooms. Originally designed by Charles B. J. Snyder to house DeWitt Clinton High School, the building was constructed in 1903. After DeWitt Clinton High School moved to the Bronx in 1929, the location served as Haaren High School. In 1988, the building was acquired by John Jay and became known as Haaren Hall. It now contains the Lloyd Sealy Library, the Gerald W. Lynch Theater, a gymnasium, and a swimming pool.

=== North Hall ===
North Hall, also known as the N building, is located at 445 West 59th Street, diagonally across the intersection from Haaren Hall. Prior to the acquisition in 1973, the building was a shoe factory.

=== Westport Building ===
Westport Building, also referred as the W building, is a 24-story residential/commercial skyscraper located at 500 West 56th Street. Constructed in 2003 by The Related Companies, the first two floors of Westport Building are occupied by John Jay. It was also the location of the John Jay branch of Barnes & Noble College Booksellers, until the summer of 2014, in which the bookstore was closed as the campus switched to a digital service.

=== BMW Building ===
The BMW Building is a commercial skyscraper on 555 West 57th Street, opened in 1992. Located adjacent to the New Building, the sixth floor of the BMW Building houses the Academic Centers and Training Rooms of John Jay.

=== 54th Street Annex ===
The 54th Street Annex is a 10-story building, built in 1930 and located at 619 West 54th Street. It is the southernmost structure of the campus. Some of John Jay's administrative offices are located there.

=== The "New" Building ===
(Also known as "The Tower" and denoted "NB".) The New Building is located at 11th Avenue between West 58th and 59th Streets. The modernistic 240-foot-tall (73 m), 13-story structure was designed by Skidmore, Owings and Merrill, and structurally engineered by Leslie E. Robertson Associates. The New Building was opened on November 2, 2011, at a cost of $600 million. The tower is directly connected to the western side of Haaren Hall and includes classrooms, conference rooms, a black box theater, a mock court, a 9/11 memorial, and an exterior roof quad called the "Jay Walk."

== Public transit access ==
John Jay College is three blocks west of the 59th Street-Columbus Circle station, served by the A, B, C, D, and 1 trains. Buses that stop near the college include the M11, M12, M31 and M57 buses.

== See also ==
- William E. Macaulay Honors College
- John Jay Report, full name: The Nature and Scope of the Problem of Sexual Abuse of Minors by Catholic Priests and Deacons in the United States, a 2004 report commissioned by the U.S. Conference of Catholic Bishops
- Anya and Andrew Shiva Art Gallery
- Lloyd Sealy Library
- List of NCAA rifle programs
