= Juvenile delinquency in the United States =

Juvenile delinquency in the United States refers to crimes committed by children or young people, particularly those under the age of eighteen (or seventeen in some states).

Juvenile delinquency has been the focus of much attention since the 1950s from academics, policymakers and lawmakers. Research is mainly focused on the causes of juvenile delinquency and which strategies have successfully diminished crime rates among the youth. Though the causes are debated and controversial, much of the debate revolves around the punishment and rehabilitation of juveniles in a youth detention center or elsewhere.

== Causes ==
Although juvenile delinquency existed throughout American history, there was an increase of attention on the issue in the 1950s. At this time, such delinquency was attributed to a breakdown in traditional family values and family structures, as well as a rise in consumerism and a distinct teenage culture.

Recent research has suggested that children with incarcerated parents are more likely to exhibit delinquent behavior compared to their peers. While some children may want to push the boundaries set by their parents or society, imposing strict laws and rules such as curfews may not necessarily lead to a decrease in juvenile delinquency rates. In fact, it may provide children with more incentive to break these rules. On the other hand, juvenile crimes can occur due to a lack of supervision and rules, such as when children commit crimes after school while their parents are at work or preoccupied. This is supported by statistics that show peak hours of juvenile crime rates. Additionally, mental illness and substance abuse have been shown to be contributing factors. The former widespread use of toxic lead in gasoline and paint – and the subsequent lead poisoning of children as a result – has been hypothesized as contributed to a higher crime rate among juveniles (i.e. the lead-crime hypothesis). 15–20% of juveniles convicted of crimes have serious mental illnesses, and the percentages increase to 30–90% of convicted juveniles when the scope of mental illnesses considered widens. Also, many people believe that a child's environment and family are greatly related to their juvenile delinquency record. The youth that live in lower income areas face high risk factors.

Thomas W. Farmer's et al. study demonstrates the different types of risks young people – especially African-American young people – face. The youth can be put into three categories: single risk, multiple risks, and no risk. The risks depend on the specific traits these youth portray. Farmer et al. state that multiple risks are a combination of aggression, academic problems and social problems while a single risk is only one of those factors. For example, the dynamics of a family can affect a child's well-being and delinquency rate. Crime rates vary due to the living situations of children. Examples include a child whose parents are together, divorced, or a child with only one parent, particularly a teenaged mom. This is largely because living arrangements are directly related to increases and decreases of poverty levels. Poverty level is another factor that is related to the chances a child has of becoming a juvenile delinquent. According to John M. Bolland et al., the level of poverty adolescents face determine their outcome. These teenagers feel as if they do not have some type of future ahead of them, so they commit crimes, dropout of school or increase the teenaged pregnancy rates. Statistics on living arrangements, poverty level and other influential factors can be found in a later section. Others believe that the environment and external factors are not at play when it comes to crime. They suggest that criminals are faced with rational choice decisions in which they chose to follow the irrational path. Finally, another cause could be the relationships a child develops in school or outside of school. A positive or negative friendship can have a great influence on the chances of children becoming delinquents. Peer pressure plays a role as well. Relationships and friendships can lead to involvement with gangs, which are major contributors of violent crimes among teenagers.

== Demographics ==
The juvenile violent crime rate index decreased for the second consecutive year in 2010. Additionally, the Children's Defense Fund communicates that boys are five times more likely than girls to become juvenile delinquents. Also on the Children Defense Fund website are statistics pertaining to Black and Latino boys and their juvenile delinquency rates. 1 of every 3 Black boys is at risk of incarceration, as well as 1 of every 6 Latino boys. The Office of Juvenile Justice and Delinquency Prevention website also says that in 2008, juveniles were the offenders in 908 cases of murder, which constitutes 9% of all murders committed that year. In the 1980s, 25% of the murders that involved juvenile delinquents as the offenders also involved an adult offender. This percentage rose to 31% in the 1990s, and averaged at 37% between 2000 and 2008.

The time of day juvenile delinquents commit their crimes are the times they are not in school. On school days, juvenile crimes peak after school is let out and declines throughout the rest of the afternoon and evening on average. On non-school days it increases in the afternoon through evening, peaking from 7 pm to 9 pm local time (usually night time) after dark. Curfews have been used to curb juvenile crime, typically the hours of 10 pm to 6 am, but only 15% of such crimes occur during curfew hours, while most (63%) juvenile crime occurs on school days. In recent years, the opportunity for after-school activities for children have decreased as public schools have deteriorated, at the same time city parks and recreational facilities have suffered funding cutbacks, both factors have left high-risk environments for kids during those hours. This suggests that funding of after-school programs and activities for juveniles would be substantially more effective at combating juvenile crime than curfews.

=== Gender ===
A large majority of juvenile delinquents are boys. Boys are five times more likely than girls to become juvenile delinquents. Moreover, there are many suggested explanations as to why it is that boys commit more crimes than girls. One comes from theorists who believe boys are naturally more aggressive than girls. Another theory argues that boys commit more crimes because of societal pressures to be masculine and aggressive. A third theory suggests that the manner in which boys are treated by their families calls for more criminal action.

=== Changes in statistics ===
Changes in these statistics can be attributed to many factors. Negative changes in the economy greatly affect all crime rates because people are more likely to find themselves in pressing situation like unemployment. Changes in population affect juvenile delinquency rates as well because changes in population translate into more or less juveniles. Shifts in population could also mean more general societal shift, like a wave of immigration. An influx of new people who are unfamiliar with the legal system could negatively affect the juvenile crime rates. Other social changes, such as educational or health reforms, could have a large impact on juvenile crime rates if they create a larger population of at-risk children.

== Legal changes ==
The United States federal government enacted legislation to unify the handling of juvenile delinquents, the Juvenile Justice and Delinquency Prevention Act of 1974. The act created the Office of Juvenile Justice and Delinquency Prevention (OJJDP) within the Department of Justice to administer grants for juvenile crime-combating programs (currently only about US$900,000 a year), gather national statistics on juvenile crime, fund research on youth crime and administer four anti-confinement mandates regarding juvenile custody. Specifically, the act orders:

- Deinstitutionalization: Youths charged with "status" offenses that would not be crimes if committed by adults, such as truancy, running away and being caught with alcohol or tobacco, must be "deinstitutionalized", which in this case really means that, with certain exceptions (e.g., minor in possession of a handgun), status offenders may not be detained by police or confined. Alleged problems with this mandate are that it overrides state and local law, limits the discretion of law enforcement officers and prevents the authorities' ability to reunify an offender with their family.
- Segregation: Arrested youths must be strictly segregated from adults in custody. Under this "out of sight and sound" mandate, juveniles cannot be served food by anyone who serves jailed adults nor can a juvenile walk down a corridor past a room where an adult is being interrogated. This requirement forces local authorities to either free juveniles or maintain expensive duplicate facilities and personnel. Small cities, towns and rural areas are especially hard hit, drastically raising those taxpayers' criminal justice costs. Supporters of the system point to lower sexual assault rates when adults and children are separated.
- Jail and Lockup Removal: As a general rule, youths subject to the original jurisdiction of juvenile courts cannot be held in jails and lockups in which adults may be detained. The act provides for a six-hour exception for identification, processing, interrogation and transfer to juvenile facilities, court or detention pending release to parents. The act also provides an exception of 24 hours for rural areas only.
- Over representation of minority youths: States must systematically try to reduce confinement of minority youths to the proportion of those groups in the population.

One of the most notable causes of juvenile delinquency is fiat, i.e., the declaration that a juvenile is delinquent by the juvenile court system without any trial, and upon finding only probable cause. Many states have laws that presuppose the less harsh treatment of juvenile delinquents than adult counterparts’ treatment. In return, the juvenile surrenders certain constitutional rights, such as a right to trial by jury, the right to cross-examine, and even the right to a speedy trial.

Notable writings by reformers such as Jerome G. Miller show that very few juvenile delinquents actually broke any law. Most were simply rounded up by the police after some event that possibly involved criminal action. They were brought before juvenile court judges who made findings of delinquency, simply because the police action established probable cause.

In 1967, the United States Supreme Court decided the case In re Gault, that established the protection of many, but not all, procedural rights of juveniles in court proceedings, such as the right to counsel and right to refuse self-incrimination.

== Preventing juvenile delinquency ==
An effective way of preventing juvenile delinquency is to tackle the problem before it happens. This entails looking at the causes of crime among teenagers and making an effort to reduce or eliminate said causes. Some causes, though hard to eliminate, seem plausible. An example of this is improving the environment at home, through employment opportunities for the parents, educational opportunities for the children, and counseling and rehabilitation services if need be. These changes would not only promote a more positive environment at home but would also work towards pulling at-risk families out of poverty. Another possible change could be the interaction of the community these adolescents live in. The involvement of neighbors could decrease the chances of violence among these communities. In Craig Pinkney's TedTalk speech, "The Real Roots of Youth Violence", he states that people do things to be heard and seen in their communities. A cause that is more difficult to eliminate is mental illness, because sometimes these illnesses are present at birth. Still, counseling and rehabilitation might aid in reducing the negative effects of these illness like violent behavior. One cause that seems almost impossible to eliminate is the rational and irrational choice idea. As mentioned above, some people believe that all crime comes down to a single situation in which an individual must make a rational or irrational decision, to commit the crime, or to not. Those that believe that this rational choice option is tied to the very immutable nature of the person would have a hard time believing that there is any way to control the choices children make and eliminate the causes of juvenile delinquency.

There are many foundations and organizations around the United States that have dedicated themselves to the reduction and elimination of juvenile delinquency.

- Office of Juvenile Justice and Delinquency Prevention (OJJDP): Forming part of the U.S. Department of Justice, this prevention agency is a governmental organization focuses on all types of research, prevention programs, and rehabilitation programs for juveniles as offenders and victims. Through collaboration, this organizations aims to improve juvenile justice policies and practices and create safer communities and neighborhoods. The OJJDP helps victims of kidnapping and sexual exploitation. Currently, the OJJDP is working to prevent gang involvement and crime, girl's delinquency, and the under-aged consumption of alcohol. This foundation is important because it guides real-life policy changes that pertain to juvenile justice and juvenile delinquency.
- The Innocence Project: The main goal of this organization is not to reduce juvenile delinquency, but rather, to liberate juveniles that were falsely convicted of crimes. Though this foundation is not primarily focused on reducing juvenile delinquency, it has done a good job of freeing falsely convicted teens in the past.
- Annie E. Casey Foundation: The goal of this foundation is to provide a brighter and safer future for children from under-served communities. Its major initiatives include: child welfare strategy group, civic sites, family economic success, juvenile detention alternatives initiative (JDAI), KIDS COUNT, leadership development, and making connections. The KIDS COUNT initiative collects annual data on the well-being of children all-round the United States and publishes state-specific reports as well as state comparisons. The JDAI focuses on providing a bright and healthy future as adults for children involved in the juvenile justice system.
- National Gang Center (NGC): A governmental project that provides anyone on the internet with information about the gang problem in the United States. There is also a list of resources on how to identify if one's city has a gang problem and how to combat this problem. This foundation helps the people within the struggling communities be the ones to solve their own gang problems.
- Best Friends Organization: This organization focuses on the overall well-being of children in the United States. It focuses on physical and emotional well-being and helps children develop healthy relationships and useful skills. Instead of focusing on the elimination of current juvenile delinquency, this organization works on creating healthy and happy children that will not resort to crime.
- Reach for Youth: This organization is available in Indianapolis, Indiana. This organization was invented to encourage teenagers to graduate and develop ways to say no to peer pressure.

== See also ==
- American juvenile justice system
- Juvenile Justice and Delinquency Prevention Act
- Juvenile justice in the United States
- List of juveniles executed in the United States since 1976
- Office of Juvenile Justice and Delinquency Prevention
- Youth incarceration in the United States
