= Bureau of Justice Statistics =

U.S. criminal justice data agency

- Seal of the United States Department of Justice

- Logo of the Bureau of Justice Statistics

Bureau/Office overview
- Formed: December 27, 1979; 46 years ago
- Jurisdiction: United States government agency
- Headquarters: 810 7th Street NW Washington, D.C., United States
- Bureau/Office executive: Alex Piquero, Director
- Parent department: Office of Justice Programs, U.S. Department of Justice
- Website: bjs.ojp.gov

The Bureau of Justice Statistics (BJS) is a bureau under the Office of Justice Programs at the United States Department of Justice. It is the principal federal agency responsible for measuring crime, criminal victimization, criminal offenders, victims of crime, correlates of crime, and the operation of criminal and civil justice systems at the federal, state, tribal, and local levels.

Established on December 27, 1979, BJS collects, analyzes, and publishes data relating to crime in the United States. The agency publishes data regarding statistics gathered from the roughly fifty-thousand agencies, offices, courts, and institutions that together comprise the American justice system.

The mission of BJS is "To collect, analyze, publish, and disseminate information on crime, criminal offenders, victims of crime, and the operation of justice systems at all levels of government."

BJS, along with the National Institute of Justice (NIJ), Bureau of Justice Assistance (BJA), Office of Juvenile Justice and Delinquency Prevention (OJJDP), Office for Victims of Crime (OVC), and other program offices, comprise the Office of Justice Programs (OJP) branch of the Department of Justice.

They collect data for Census of State and Local Law Enforcement Agencies (CSLLEA).

== Programs ==
The BJS conducts the Annual Survey of Jails of a sample of about 950 American jails, and a periodic Census of Jails covering all American jails. Data from these programs was used to show that local jails in the United States had a sharp decline in inmates from February to May 2020 of perhaps 185,000 inmates, more than 20% of the inmate population, in response to the danger of COVID-19 on a crowded incarcerated population. Many inmates were given an "expedited release".

== See also ==
- Uniform Crime Reports (FBI)
- Data.gov
- USAFacts

== BJS directors ==
In 2005, the Bush administration replaced BJS Director Lawrence Greenfeld after he refused to remove certain racial statistics from a report, despite having published similar statistics in 2001. The following two references provide analysis and initial reporting, respectively.

- Joseph M. Bessette
- Eric Lichtblau

More recent directors have included Jeffrey H. Anderson, Jeffrey Sedgwick, Michael Sinclair, John Jay Professor James P. Lynch, and former Deputy Director William Sabol.

Until 2012, the position of the BJS Director required a Senate approval, but since 2012 the post only requires the President's appointment. Alex Piquero is the current BJS Director.
