= Stab vest =

Piece of body armor which resists knife attacks

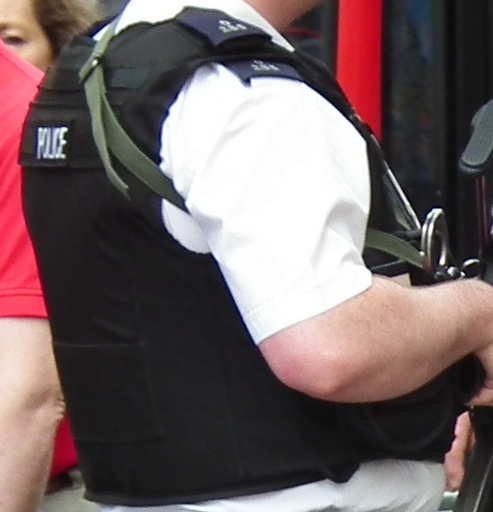
An armed British police officer wearing a ballistic vest

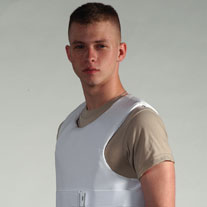
Stab-Protective Body Armor, Concealable (CSPBA)

A stab vest or stab proof vest is a reinforced piece of body armor, worn under or over other items of clothing, which is designed to resist knife attacks to the chest, back and sides.

Stab vests can be made from a variety of materials but are usually made with high-strength synthetic fibers. This is similar to ballistic vests, but stab vests are constructed with a tighter weave.

== Use ==
Stab vests are standard issue to police officers in both the United Kingdom and New Zealand. They are also commonly worn by other high-risk workers, including security professionals, corrections officers, and emergency medical personnel.

Ballistic vests are more commonly used by police in countries with greater firearms ownership, such as the United States and Canada; but multi-threat armor, which combines stab and ballistic protection, is available for police and other security applications.

== Standards ==
=== "Ice pick" tests ===
In the mid-1980s the state of California Department of Corrections issued a requirement for a body armor using a commercial ice pick as the test penetrator. The test method attempted to simulate the capacity of a human attacker to deliver impact energy with their upper body. As was later shown, this test overstated the capacity of human attackers. The test used a drop mass or sabot that carried the ice pick. Using gravitational force, the height of the drop mass above the vest was proportional to the impact energy. This test specified 109 joules (81 ft·lbf) of energy and a 7.3 kg (16 lb) drop mass with a drop height of 153 cm (60 in) and an ice pick with a 4 mm (0.16 in) diameter with a sharp tip with a 5.4 m/s (18 ft/s) terminal velocity in the test. The California standard did not include knife or cutting edge weapons in the test protocol. In this early phase only titanium and steel plate offerings were successful in addressing this requirement.

These textile materials do not have equal performance with cutting-edge threats and these certifications were only with ice picks and were not tested with knives.

=== United Kingdom ===
The Police Scientific Development Branch (PSDB) studied the type of weapons that are commonly used in stabbing attacks and the levels of impact energy fit young men are capable of generating during such an attack. The study resulted in minimum performance ratings for armour used in the UK, as defined under PSDB publication 6/99.

The PSDB standard was replaced in 2007 with the Home Office Scientific Development Branch (HOSDB) publication No. 39/07/C which governs stab resistant body armor performance in the UK. This updated standard introduced a more stringent testing procedure with more drops than the previous standard plus the introduction of the P1/B Blade which is found to be more aggressive than the older P1/A Blade.

The HOSBD standard was updated in 2017 with the Centre for Applied Science and Technology (CAST) publication No. 012/17. The CAST standard introduced formed armour testing and improved production quality testing with critical perforation analysis.

In the UK there are no standalone ratings for spike resistance. For stab resistant armor to carry a spike resistance (SP) rating in the UK, it must first pass minimum knife resistance (KR) performance tests.

=== United States ===
In the US, the National Institute of Justice (NIJ) has established a stab-resistant body armor test standard (NIJ STD 0115.00), based on the work in the UK, which defines two threat types: spike and edged blade.

Manufacturers of body armor can voluntarily submit armor models for compliance testing through the National Law Enforcement and Corrections Technology Center in Rockville, Maryland. Through the program, manufacturers certify that their armor will defeat the specified threat at one of three threat levels. Threat levels 1, 2 and 3 are based on impact energies of 24 J (18 ft⋅lbf), 33 J (24 ft⋅lbf), and 43 J (32 ft⋅lbf) joules respectively.

== See also ==
- Bulletproof vest
- Brigandine
