= Luke McCormack =

Luke McCormack may refer to:

- Luke McCormack (chief information officer) (fl. 2013-2017), American chief information officer
- Luke McCormack (boxer) (born 1995), English boxer

== See also ==
- Luke McCormick (disambiguation)
