= National Institute of Justice =

U.S. Department of Justice research and development agency

- Seal of the United States Department of Justice

- Logo of the National Institute of Justice

Bureau/Office overview
- Formed: October 21, 1968; 57 years ago
- Jurisdiction: Federal government of the United States
- Headquarters: 810 7th Street NW Washington, D.C., United States
- Bureau/Office executive: Jennifer Scherer, Director
- Parent department: Office of Justice Programs, U.S. Department of Justice
- Website: nij.ojp.gov

The National Institute of Justice (NIJ) is an affiliated institute of the Office of Justice Programs at the United States Department of Justice.

The institute, along with the Bureau of Justice Statistics, the Bureau of Justice Assistance, the Office of Juvenile Justice and Delinquency Prevention, the Office for Victims of Crime, and other program offices, comprise the Office of Justice Programs at the United States Department of Justice.

== History ==
The National Institute of Law Enforcement and Criminal Justice was established on October 21, 1968, under the Omnibus Crime Control and Safe Streets Act of 1968, as a component of the Law Enforcement Assistance Administration (LEAA). In 1978, it was renamed the National Institute of Justice. Some functions of the LEAA were absorbed by NIJ on December 27, 1979, with the passage of the Justice System Improvement Act of 1979. The act, which amended the Omnibus Crime Control and Safe Streets Act of 1968, also led to the creation of the Bureau of Justice Statistics. In 1982, the LEAA was succeeded by the Office of Justice Assistance, Research, and Statistics (1982–1984) and then the Office of Justice Programs in 1984.

NIJ was notable among U.S. governmental research organizations because it is headed by a political appointee of the president rather than by a scientist or a member of the civil service. The Presidential Appointment Efficiency and Streamlining Act of 2011 removed the need for Senate confirmation of the NIJ director.

In 2010, the United States National Research Council released a report on reforming the NIJ and identified issues with its independence, budget, and scientific mission. While it considered making the NIJ separate from its current department, the Office of Justice Programs, it recommended retaining the NIJ within the OJP but giving it increased independence and authority through clear qualifications for its director, control over its budget, and a statutory advisory board. It also recommended that the NIJ: (1) focus on research rather than forensic capacity building activities, (2) increase funding for programs for graduate researchers, (3) increase transparency, and (4) do periodic self-assessments.

The NIJ can be susceptible to political influence, as manifested, for instance, by its removal from its website of "a study showing that far-right attacks outpace all other types of terrorism and domestic violence extremism" during the Second presidency of Donald Trump. (That study remains available on the Internet Archive.)

== Research areas ==
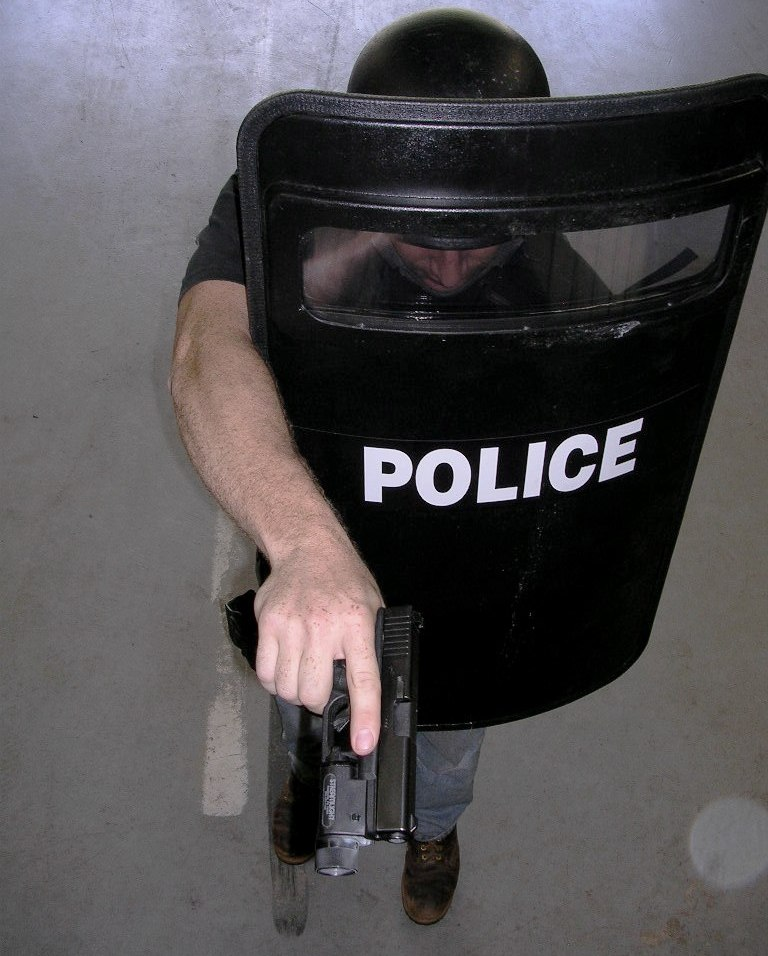
A police officer using a ballistic shield NIJ Level IIIA

NIJ directors (and acting directors)
Name	Dates
Ralph Siu	October 21, 1968–March 1969
Robert L. Emrich (acting)	February 1969–May 1969
Henry S. Ruth Jr.	May 1969–June 1970
Irving Slott (acting)	June 1970–September 1971
Martin Danziger	September 1971–August 1973
Henry Scarr (acting)	August 1973–October 1977
Gerald Caplan	October 1973 – 1977
Blair Ewing (acting)	1977–1979
Harry Bratt (acting)	1979–1981
James Underwood (acting)	1981–1982
W. Robert Burkhart (acting)	1982
James K. Stewart	1982–1990
Charles B. DeWitt	1990–1993
Michael J. Russell (acting)	1993–1994
Carol V. Petrie (acting)	1994
Jeremy Travis	1994–2000
Julie Samuels (acting)	2000–2001
Sarah V. Hart	2001–2005
Glenn R. Schmitt (acting)	2005 – June 2007
David Hagy	June 2007 – January 2009
Kristina Rose (acting)	January 2009 – June 2010
John H. Laub	July 22, 2010 – January 4, 2013
Greg Ridgeway (acting)	June 2013–June 2014
William J. Sabol (acting)	August 2014–February 2015
Nancy Rodriguez	February 9, 2015 – January 13, 2017
Howard Spivak (acting)	January 21, 2017–July 2017
David Muhlhausen	July 25, 2017 – January 20, 2021
Jennifer Scherer (acting)	January 20, 2021 – May 9, 2022
Nancy La Vigne	May 9, 2022 - January 2025
Jennifer Scherer (acting)	January 2025 – present

NIJ is focused on advancing technology for criminal justice application including law enforcement and corrections, forensics, and judicial processes, as well as criminology, criminal justice, and related social science research. Much of this research is facilitated by providing grants to academic institutions, non-profit research organizations, and other entities, as well as collaborating with state and local governments. Areas of social science research include violence against women, corrections, and crime prevention, as well as program evaluation.

Grants for technology development help facilitate research and development of technology and tools for criminal justice application, which is a need that the private sector is otherwise reluctant to meet. NIJ also supports development of voluntary equipment performance standards, as well as conducting compliance testing. Areas of technology research and development include biometrics, communications interoperability, information technology, less-lethal technologies (e.g. tasers), and officer safety including bullet-proof vests. Crime mapping and analysis is a topic that includes both technology and social science (geography) aspects. The National Law Enforcement and Corrections Technology Centers, which are located throughout the United States, play a role in law enforcement technology development, testing, and dissemination.

In the 2000s, NIJ developed the National Missing and Unidentified Persons System.

=== DNA initiative ===
A major area of research and support is for forensics and the president's DNA initiative. The Federal Bureau of Investigation developed the Combined DNA Index System (CODIS) system as a central database of DNA profiles taken from offenders. In the late 1980s and 1990s, all of the states and the federal government required DNA samples to be collected from offenders in certain types of cases. The demand (casework) for DNA analysis in public crime laboratories increased 73% from 1997 to 2000, and by 2003, there was a backlog of 350,000 rape and homicide cases. In 2003, President George W. Bush proposed the Advancing Justice Through DNA Technology initiative, which would include $1 billion over five years to reduce backlogs, develop and improve capacity of state and local law enforcement to use DNA analysis, support research and development to improve the technology, and additional training for those working in the criminal justice system.

=== Technical working groups ===
Technical working groups (or TWGs) were created by the National Institute of Justice to create crime scene guides for state and local law enforcement. The guides were individually developed by a separate Technical Working Group tasked with a single topic. The groups were a multidisciplinary group of content-area experts from across the United States. The groups included urban and rural jurisdictions as well as Federal agencies representatives. Each participating member was experienced in the area of crime scene investigation and evidence collection in the criminal justice system from the standpoints of law enforcement, prosecution, defense, or forensic science. The Technical Working Groups were designed to be short term in duration to respond to a topic. Longer term groups exist under other organizations such as the FBI's Scientific Working Group (SWG's) on Digital Evidence.

Technology Working Group topics have included:

1. Aviation
2. Biometrics
3. Body Armor
4. Communications
5. Community Corrections
6. DNA Forensics
7. Electronic Crime
8. Explosive Device Defeat
9. General Forensics
10. Geospatial Technologies
11. Information-Led Policing
12. Institutional Corrections
13. Less-Lethal Technologies
14. Modeling and Simulation
15. Officer Safety and Protective Technologies
16. Personal Protection Equipment
17. Pursuit Management
18. School Safety
19. Sensors and Surveillance
20. Weapons Detection

During the several years of their existence they developed numerous guides including the following:

- Body armor testing for bulletproofing and stabproofing
- Crime Scene Investigation: A Reference for Law Enforcement (pdf, 60 pages) Published June 2004
- Death Investigation: A Guide for the Scene Investigator (pdf, 72 pages) Published November 1999
- Fire and Arson Scene Evidence: A Guide for Public Safety Personnel (pdf, 73 pages) Published June 2000
- Guide for Explosion and Bombing Scene Investigation (pdf, 64 pages) Published July 2000
- Electronic Crime Scene Investigation: A Guide for First Responders (pdf, 93 pages) First Edition published July 2001; second edition published 2008

== See also ==
- Law Enforcement Assistance Administration (LEAA)
- National Criminal Justice Reference Service (NCJRS)
- National Law Enforcement and Corrections Technology Center (NLECTC)
