= Scott Green (American football official) =

American football official (born 1951)

Scott H. Green
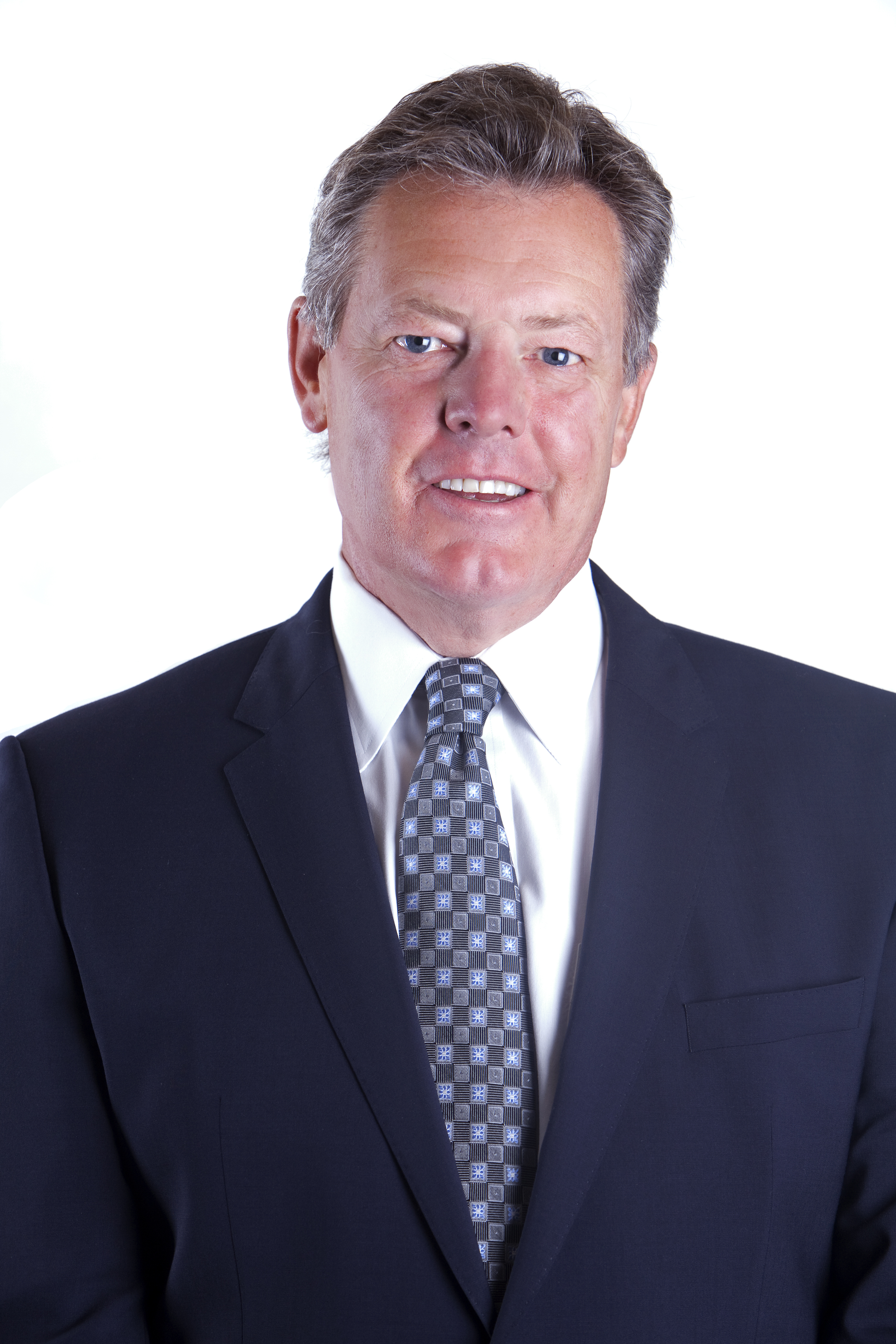
- Born: February 20, 1951 (age 75); Doylestown, Pennsylvania, U.S.
- Education: University of Delaware (B.A. '73)
- Occupations: NFL official, public safety consultant
- Years active: 1991-2013 (as NFL official); Since 1994 (as contractor)
- Known for: U.S. Senate Judiciary Committee staff member (1985–90); Referee for 2010 Super Bowl

Scott H. Green (born February 20, 1951) is a former American football official in the National Football League (NFL) from the 1991 NFL season until the 2013 NFL season. He had officiated Super Bowls XXXVI in 2002, XXXVIII in 2004, and was the referee for XLIV in 2010. Green was also the head of the NFL Referees Association (NFLRA) and led negotiations during the 2012 NFL referee lockout.

Outside his part-time work in professional football, Green works as a Washington, D.C. contractor for public safety and criminal justice agencies as part of a firm he co-founded in 1994. Green announced his retirement at the conclusion of the 2013 football season.

== Background ==
Green is a 1969 graduate of Central Bucks High School in Doylestown, Pennsylvania, where he was a linebacker and kicker. He is a 1973 graduate of the University of Delaware, where he received a bachelor's degree in criminal justice. Prior to his NFL career, from 1985 to 1990 Green was a Judiciary Committee staff person under then-Senator Joe Biden. In 1994, Green, a resident of Potomac Falls, Virginia, co-founded the Lafayette Group with Charles B. DeWitt, a Washington, D.C., government contractor that focuses on public safety and emergency management; as of 2014 the firm employs 90 people.

== Officiating career ==
Green started in the NFL as a field judge with the start of the 1991 NFL season before switching to back judge after the league swapped position titles at the start of the 1998 NFL season. Green worked Super Bowl XXXVI on February 3, 2002, as a back judge, Super Bowl XXXVIII on February 1, 2004, also as a back judge, and Super Bowl XLIV on February 7, 2010, as referee. His last assignment was the Pro Bowl on January 26, 2014, in Honolulu as referee.

Green wore uniform number 19, now worn by Clay Martin.

=== Back judge ===
Green was considered by some to be the top back judge in the league. He was however involved in a situation described by commissioner Paul Tagliabue as the most disappointing officiating blunder he'd seen in his years as NFL commissioner. During a New York Giants and San Francisco 49ers Wild Card playoff game in January 2003. Green did not realize that New York's Rich Seubert had lined up legally in a receiver's spot and failed to award a penalty when he was interfered with following an attempted field goal, instead penalizing him. It was later announced that officiating mechanics surrounding field-goal attempts and last plays of games would be changed.

=== Promotion to referee ===
He became a referee on a part-time basis during the 2004 NFL season when referee Johnny Grier was injured. Green became a full-time referee at the start of the 2005 NFL season after Grier was forced to retire due to a leg injury. Green's first experience as an NFL referee came on October 3, 2004, during a game between the New England Patriots and the Buffalo Bills.

Green's 2013 NFL officiating crew consisted of umpire Bruce Stritesky, head linesman Tom Stabile, line judge Mike Spanier, field judge Boris Cheek, side judge Larry Rose, and back judge Scott Helverson.

During an NFL game he was officiating between the Pittsburgh Steelers and San Diego Chargers in 2008, Green ruled a lateral play by the Steelers as illegal, a decision he later conceded was wrong. The incident has prompted the NFL to discuss "potential administrative improvements for replay that would help to prevent this type of mistake in the future."
