= Charles DeWitt (disambiguation) =

Charles DeWitt (1727–1787) was a delegate to the Continental Congress of United States.

Charles DeWitt may also refer to:

- Charles G. DeWitt (1789–1839), former member of the United States House of Representatives from New York
- Charles W. DeWitt Jr. (born 1947), former member of the Louisiana House of Representatives
- Charles B. DeWitt (born 1950), former director of the National Institutes of Justice
