= National Gang Center =

The National Gang Center (NGC) is a coordinated project of three federal agencies, the Office of Justice Programs (OJP), Bureau of Justice Assistance (BJA), and the Office of Juvenile Justice and Delinquency Prevention (OJJDP).

In the agency's statement on its website, it concedes that gang activities go beyond ages of gang members. The statement also says that the agency's strategies vary from prevention to intervention, suppression.

== See also ==
- National Gang Intelligence Center
