= Office of Attorney Recruitment and Management =

- Seal of the United States Department of Justice

Office overview
- Jurisdiction: Federal government of the United States
- Headquarters: Robert F. Kennedy Department of Justice Building; 950 Pennsylvania Avenue NW; Washington, D.C., United States
- Office executive: Eleanor Carpenter, Director
- Website: www.justice.gov/oarm/

The Office of Attorney Recruitment and Management (OARM) is the office of the United States Department of Justice (DOJ) responsible for the recruitment of law students and attorneys for the department. It is also responsible to oversee matters pertaining to the employment, separation and general administration of the DOJ attorneys and law students in the general schedule pay grades of GS-15 and below. The OARM oversees many programs regarding law school and attorney assistance and internships. The OARM is the DOJ's adjudicative office in FBI Whistleblower cases.

Under the Freedom of Information Act (United States) (FOIA) requests for the OARM are handled by the Justice Management Division.
