= Journal of Quantitative Criminology =

- Discipline: Criminology
- Language: English
- Edited by: John MacDonald, Greg Ridgeway

Publication details
- History: 1985-present
- Publisher: Springer Science+Business Media
- Frequency: Quarterly
- Impact factor: 4.239 (2020)

Standard abbreviations
- ISO 4: J. Quant. Criminol.

Indexing
- CODEN: JQCRE6
- ISSN: 0748-4518 (print); 1573-7799 (web)
- LCCN: sf95094419
- JSTOR: 07484518
- OCLC no.: 299333806

Links
- Journal homepage; Online access

The Journal of Quantitative Criminology is a quarterly peer-reviewed academic journal in the field of criminology. It was established in 1985 and is published by Springer Science+Business Media. The editors-in-chief are John MacDonald and Greg Ridgeway (University of Pennsylvania).

== Abstracting and indexing ==
The journal is abstracted and indexed in:

- Social Sciences Citation Index
- Scopus
- PsycINFO
- EBSCO databases
- CSA databases
- ProQuest
- Academic OneFile
- Academic Search
- Current Contents/Social & Behavioral Sciences
- Current Index to Statistics

According to the Journal Citation Reports, the journal has a 2020 impact factor of 4.239.
