= Nancy Rodriguez (criminologist) =

American academic

Director of the National Institute of Justice
- In office February 9, 2015 – January 13, 2017
- President: Barack Obama
- Preceded by: William Sabol
- Succeeded by: Howard Spivak

Personal details
- Born: June 6, 1970 (age 56)
- Party: Democratic
- Education: Sam Houston State University (BA); Washington State University (MA, PhD)

Nancy Rodriguez (born June 6, 1970) is an American criminologist and professor in the School of Social Ecology at the University of California, Irvine.

Her research focuses on substance abuse, juvenile court decision-making, and sentencing policies. She previously taught in the School of Criminology and Criminal Justice at Arizona State University from 1998 to 2015. She was the director of the National Institute of Justice (NIJ) from February 9, 2015, to January 13, 2017. She was originally nominated to direct the NIJ in 2014 by then-president of the United States Barack Obama.

== Biography ==
Rodriguez received her B.A. in criminal justice from Sam Houston State University in 1992 and her Ph.D. in political science from Washington State University in 1998. She joined the faculty of ASU in 1998. She has received multiple awards, including the Coramae Richey Mann Award from the American Society of Criminology and the W.E.B. DuBois Award from the Western Society of Criminology.
