= Victims of Crime Act of 1984 =

United States federal government legislation

The Victims of Crime Act of 1984 (VOCA) is United States federal government legislation aimed at helping the victims of crime through means other than punishment of the criminal. It established the Crime Victim's Fund, a scheme to compensate victims of crime.

== History ==
In the mid-1960s, liberal politicians proposed victim compensation. At the time, conservative politicians opposed the proposal, arguing that it was too costly for the government. Over time, conservatives proposed their own version, VOCA, which was funded entirely from fines on criminals.

== Crime victim's fund ==
The Office for Victims of Crime, established by the Victims of Crime Act (VOCA) of 1984, administers the Crime Victims Fund. The fund is financed by fines paid by convicted federal offenders. As of September 2013, the Fund balance had reached almost $9 billion. Revenues deposited into the Fund also come from gifts, donations, and bequests by private parties, as provided by an amendment to VOCA through the Patriot Act that went into effect in 2002. From 2002 – 2013, over $300,000 has been deposited into the Fund through this provision.

== See also ==
- Office for Victims of Crime
