= OneDOJ =

Law enforcement database in the United States

OneDOJ is a central database that allows local law enforcement in the United States to search and read federal criminal cases. This database holds records on cases, criminal investigations, criminal history, and personal details of other persons.

== Software ==
The software took about 18 months to develop. In 2006 it had about 1,000,000 entries, and was expected to triple by 2009. The software was inspired by the September 11th terrorist attack on the United States of America. A memo that came out December 21, 2006 urged officials to put an aggressive plan into action to bring this database alive and current. In addition a committee was created to speed up the development of this database. Since the development, local agencies can request access to this database, which will allow them to view federal, and other state police files. Many federal agencies contribute to this database which include the Drug Enforcement Administration, Federal Bureau of Investigation, Bureau of Prisons, ATF, and various other local agencies. This database also allows agencies to keep ownership of their files.

== Criticism ==
The OneDOJ has run into some criticism. One person from the Civil Liberties Union said, "Raw police files or FBI reports can never be verified and can never be corrected." Another concern is files and reports entered may have information on a person who hasn't been accused, arrested or charged.

=== Security concerns ===
Many civil liberty organizations are concerned that the database is a privacy threat. The database includes information about suspects in federal cases, that local agencies get full access to. Another security concern was brought up, because false information could be entered into the database, possibly diminishing the person's record, or giving the police a false lead. Officials say that all the information that is in the OneDOJ is already in another database that has a chance of being leaked, and the database is just making it easier for local agencies to come together to solve a crime. Part of the fear may come from a congressional committee giving the Department of Justice a "D" on computer security in 2007.
