= Ralph Siu =

American scholar

1st Director of the National Institute of Justice
- In office 1968–1969

Personal details
- Born: 1917 Honolulu, Territory of Hawaii
- Died: December 29, 1998 (aged 80) Washington, D.C.
- Education: University of Hawaiʻi (B.S, M.S); California Institute of Technology (Ph.D.)

Ralph Gun Hoy Siu (1917 – December 29, 1998) was an American scholar, military and civil servant, and author. Siu served as the first Director of the National Institute of Justice from 1968 to 1969.

== Early life and education ==
Siu was born in Honolulu, Hawaii in 1917. Siu obtained his bachelor's degree in chemistry and master's degree in plant physiology. from the University of Hawaiʻi. He then earned a Ph.D in bio-organic chemistry from the California Institute of Technology.

== Career ==
After earning his Ph.D, Siu joined the Quartermaster Corps and headed a team of researchers that developed new fabrics, clothing and equipment for jungle use. As the Quartermaster Corps’ Director of Laboratories and Chief Scientific and Technical Director for more than a decade (1948–1962), Siu led numerous projects, including pioneer efforts on food irradiation – a key component of President Dwight D. Eisenhower’s Atoms for Peace program. In 1961, he received the National Career Civil Service Award. From 1962 to 1966, Siu served as Scientific Director, for the Research Division of the United States Army Materiel Command. He then became Deputy Director of the Materiel Command and was stationed in Washington, D.C. from 1966 to 1968.

In 1968, Siu became Associate Administrator of the Law Enforcement Assistance Administration with the Department of Justice and was subsequently nominated by President Lyndon B. Johnson to direct the newly-created National Institute of Law Enforcement and Criminal Justice. However, he was not confirmed and the administration changed after the 1968 election, so he retired in March, 1969.

Siu wrote several books in the field of management, including The Tao of Science (1957), and The Craft of Power (1979). In 1988, the Journal of Humanistic Psychology published an article by Ralph Siu entitled "Panetics—The Study of the Infliction of Suffering".

In 1991, the International Society for Panetics was founded by Ralph Siu and sixty other scientists, physicians, business leaders, scholars, artists and writers from several countries, including Kenneth Boulding and Johan Galtung. The society was dedicated to the study and development of ways to reduce the infliction of human suffering by individuals, corporations, governments, professions, social groups and other institutions. It issued a journal, Panetics, and sponsored the annual Ralph G. H. Siu Memorial Lecture in Washington, D.C., featuring a prominent speaker on a subject of concern to panetics. In 2009, Siu's collected writings were donated to the University of Toledo on behalf of the International Society for Panetics.

== Personal life ==
In 1949, Siu met Irene I-lien Hsu. On February 12, 1950, they were married in Yonkers, New York.

On December 29, 1998, Ralph Siu died of congestive heart failure at George Washington University Hospital at the age of 80.

== Works ==
- The Quantum and the Tao—A Unified East-West Psychophilosophical Synthesis toward Harmonious Living
- Microbial Decomposition of Cellulose, U.S. Government Printing Office, 1951.
- Radiation Preservation of Foods, U.S. Government Printing Office, 1957.

I. Tao-Time Trilogy

- Volume 1. The Tao of Science. An Essay on Western Knowledge and Eastern Wisdom. MIT Press, 1957. ISBN 0-262-69004-7
- Volume 2. The Man of Many Qualities. A Legacy of the I Ching. (Paperback: The Portable Dragon). MIT Press, 1968.
- Volume 3. Ch i: A Neo-Taoist Approach to Life. MIT Press, 1974.

II. Management Trilogy

- Volume 4. The Craft of Power. John Wiley & Sons Inc, 1979. Willam Morrow, 1984. ISBN 0-68802625-7
- Volume 5. Transcending the Power Game. The Way to Executive Serenity. John Wiley & Sons Inc, 1980.
- Volume 6. The Master Manager. John Wiley & Sons Inc, 1980. ISBN 047107961-8

III. Panetics Trilogy

- Volume 7. Less Suffering for Everybody. An Introduction to Panetics. The International Society for Panetics, 1994. ISBN 188443701-X
- Volume 8. Panetics and Dukkha. An Integrated Study of the Infliction of Suffering and the Reduction of Infliction. The International Society for Panetics, 1994. ISBN 188443702-8
- Volume 9. Seeds of Reflection. Word Clusters for Meditation on the Infliction and the Relief of Suffering. The International Society for Panetics, 1994. ISBN 188443703-6

IV. Harmony Trilogy

- Volume 10. Unifying Theory of the Human Organism and Behavior, International Society for Panetics, 1999
- Volume 11. Cheerfulness, International Society for Panetics, 1999
- Volume 12. Shaping One s Own Life. A Socratic Anthology of Perennial Questions, International Society for Panetics, 1999
- Understanding and Minimizing the Infliction of Suffering; An Integrated Discipline Called Panetics, The International Society for Panetics, May 1999
- The Land of Keikitran and Eleevan, Hats Off Books, 2001. ISBN 158736075-6
