= Greg Ridgeway =

- Born: 1973 (age 52–53)
- Education: California Polytechnic State University; University of Washington
- Awards: Fellow of the American Statistical Association
- Scientific career
- Fields: Criminology; Statistics
- Workplaces: National Institute of Justice; RAND Corporation; University of Pennsylvania
- Thesis: Generalization of boosting algorithms and applications of Bayesian inference for massive datasets
- Doctoral advisors: David Madigan; Thomas S. Richardson

Gregory Kirk Ridgeway (born 1973) is professor of criminology and statistics at the University of Pennsylvania, where he is also chair of the Department of Criminology.

== Education ==
Ridgeway received his B.S. from California Polytechnic State University in 1995 and his M.S. and Ph.D. from the University of Washington in 1997 and 1999, respectively. All three of his degrees are in statistics. His Ph.D. thesis was entitled "Generalization of boosting algorithms and applications of Bayesian inference for massive datasets".

== Career ==
Early in his career, Ridgeway worked at the RAND Corporation, where he served as the director of the Safety and Justice Program from 2009 to 2012, and of the Center for Quality Policing from 2008 to 2012. He later served as the acting director of the National Institute of Justice for 19 months before joining the University of Pennsylvania in August 2014. In January 2021, he was named the co-editor-in-chief of the Journal of Quantitative Criminology.

== Research ==
Ridgeway's research focuses on using statistical techniques to examine aspects of the United States' criminal justice system. These aspects include, but are not limited to, stop-and-frisk in New York City, which, in a 2007 study, he found was racially biased, with blacks and Hispanics being more likely to be frisked, searched, or arrested once stopped (though they were no more likely to be stopped than whites).

== Honors and awards ==
Ridgeway is a fellow of the American Statistical Association.
