= Luke McCormick =

Luke McCormick may refer to:

- Luke McCormick (footballer, born 1983), English footballer for Plymouth Argyle
- Luke McCormick (footballer, born 1999), English footballer for Yeovil Town

== See also ==
- Luke McCormack (disambiguation)
