= Charles B. DeWitt =

Former NIJ Director

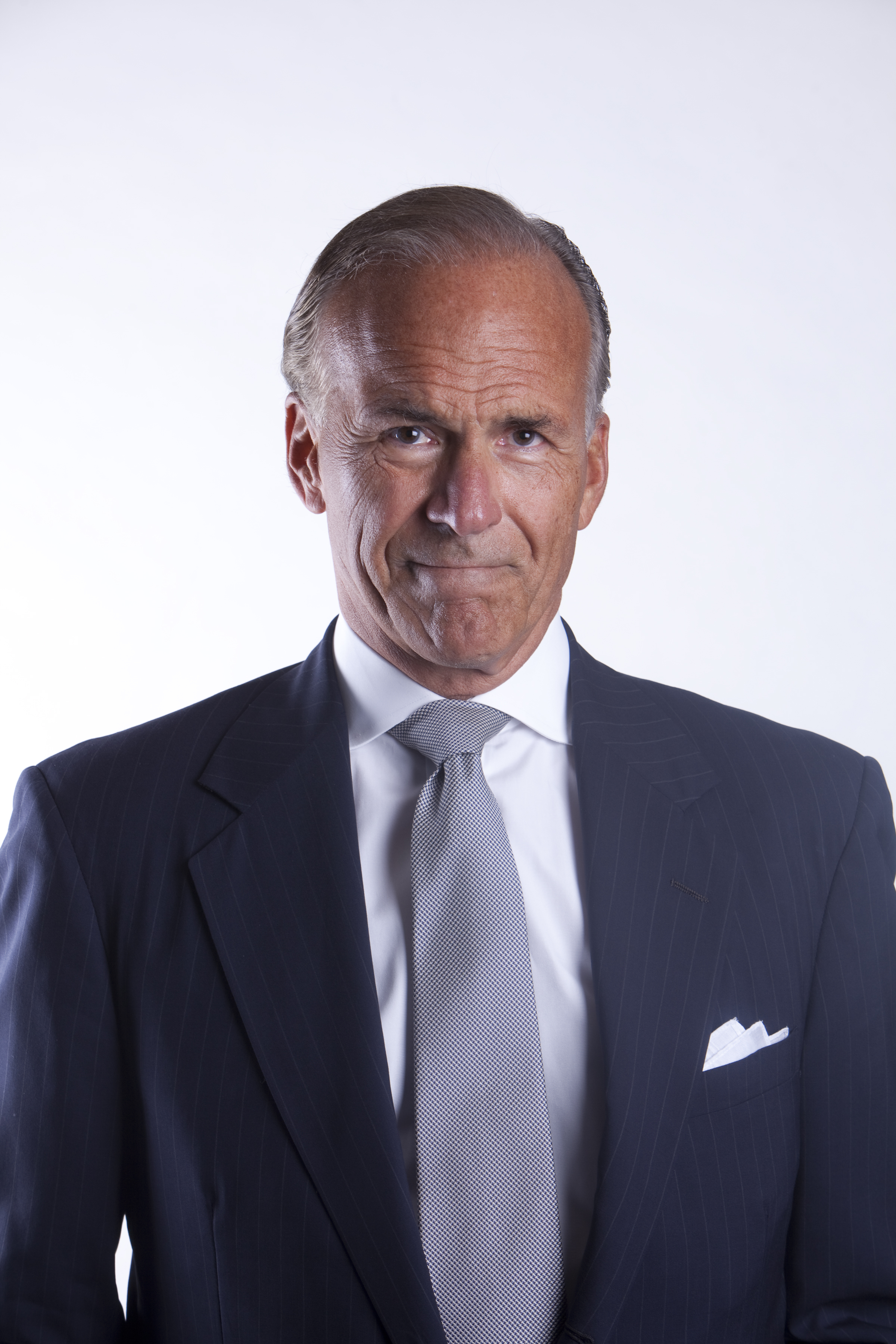

Director of the National Institute of Justice
- In office 1990–1993
- President: George H. W. Bush

Personal details
- Born: March 13, 1950 (age 76) California, U.S.
- Education: Cambridge University; Stanford University; Oxford University

Charles B. DeWitt, is an American government official who served at the White House Office and the United States Department of Justice. DeWitt served as Director of the National Institute of Justice from 1990 to 1993.

== Education ==
A native of California, DeWitt studied criminology at Oxford and University of Cambridge and is a graduate of Stanford University. He rose from deputy sheriff to Director of the Justice Division for Santa Clara County, leaving his post in 1984 to become a Fellow at the Department of Justice, where he was responsible for corrections and law enforcement programs.

== Career ==
=== White House ===
DeWitt was assigned by the Department of Justice to the White House, where he was responsible for a classified task force report on border security to enhance coordination between domestic policy and national security agencies. He was appointed by the White House to serve as Director of Border Security. DeWitt also worked with the United States Domestic Policy Council, and reviewed the Office of National Drug Control Policy. While at the White House, he coordinated policy issues with the Departments of Justice, Treasury, and Defense, as well as the intelligence community.

=== National Institute of Justice ===
DeWitt was nominated by the President in 1990 and confirmed by the U.S. Senate to become Director of the National Institute of Justice. He approved hundreds of grants to law enforcement agencies to demonstrate innovations in policing that are operational today. Programs to strengthen the nation’s justice system included joint efforts with the FBI, Secret Service and interagency agreements with DHS Science and Technology Directorate to foster new technologies, communications, and information systems.

He was authorized by Congress to provide technical support and Federal funding to law enforcement agencies, manage crime prevention programs, and develop law enforcement technology and improvements to the Nation’s justice system. The Director advises the Attorney General, and exercises sole and final authority over Federal grants and contracts for more than 500 active projects. DeWitt was responsible for national publications and conferences of the DOJ. DeWitt developed and authorized many policy and technology projects still underway at the Department of Justice. Also in this position, he developed and executed reorganization plan, including new Technology and Evaluation Divisions, and established initiatives on corrections, gangs; counterterrorism; information systems for police; DNA fingerprinting and evidence systems; police use of force; environmental crime; non-lethal weapons; stalking; and white collar crime. He also created and managed national plan to implement community policing.

== Personal life ==
DeWitt currently works as a Washington, D.C. management consultant for public safety and national security agencies.
