= Luke McCormack (chief information officer) =

- Education: University of Maryland
- Occupation: Chief Information Officer

Luke J. McCormack was the chief information officer of the U.S. Department of Homeland Security from December 16, 2013, to May 2, 2017.

== Early life and education ==
McCormack is a native of Long Island, N.Y., and resides in Virginia. He has two sons. He holds an MBA from the University of Maryland's Smith School and certifications from Columbia University and the National Defense University.

== Career ==
Before joining the federal government, he worked for various private sector companies including MCI and Ford Aerospace.

From 1999 to 2005, he worked in several capacities at Customs and Border Protection. From 2005 to 2012, he worked as CIO for the Immigration and Customs Enforcement.

He began at the Department of Justice as Deputy Assistant Attorney General for Information Resources Management/Chief Information Officer.

He is currently on the board of advisors for TRI-COR Industries, an IT services firm.

Government offices
Preceded by Richard Spires	Chief Information Officer Department of Homeland Security; December 2013 – May 2017	Succeeded by Richard Staropoli
