= Armored car =

Armored (or armoured) car may refer to:

== Wheeled armored vehicles ==
- Armored car (military), a wheeled armoured fighting vehicle
- Non-military armored vehicle
  - Armored car (valuables), an armored van or truck used to transport valuables
  - Armored car (VIP), a civilian vehicle with a reinforced structure
  - Police armored vehicle, a vehicle used by police to respond to incidents

== Other uses ==
- Armored Car (film), a 1937 American film
- Armored Car (video game), a 1981 video game
- "Armored Car" (Baywatch), a 1990 television episode
