= National Law Enforcement and Corrections Technology Center =

U.S. Department of Justice research and development program

The National Law Enforcement and Corrections Technology Center (NLECTC) was originally created in 1994 as a program of the National Institute of Justice's (NIJ's) Office of Science and Technology.

== Resources ==
The States, Major Cities and Counties Regional Center offers a resource and outreach mechanism for state, major city and county criminal justice system partners, with a mission of ensuring that larger criminal justice agencies (those having 50 or more sworn personnel) have unbiased access to a full range of relevant scientific and technology-related information. The Small, Rural, Tribal and Border Regional Center publicizes its programs and services to small, rural, tribal and border agencies across the country. The efforts of these centers complement those of NLECTC-National, which coordinates NIJ's Compliance Testing program and standards development efforts for a variety of equipment used in the public safety arena, and the Centers of Excellence (CoEs), which support NIJ's research, development, testing and evaluation (RDT&E) efforts in specific portfolio areas. The CoEs focus on the following topic areas: Communications Technologies, Forensic Science, Sensors, Surveillance and Biometric Technologies, and Weapons and Protective Systems. The National Institute of Standards and Technology's Office of Law Enforcement Standards provides scientific and research support to these efforts.

== Provisions ==
As a whole, the NLECTC System provides:

• Scientific and technical support to NIJ’s RDT&E projects.
• Support for the transfer and adoption of technology into practice by law enforcement and corrections agencies, courts and crime laboratories.
• Assistance in developing and disseminating equipment performance standards and technology guides.
• Assistance in the demonstration, testing and evaluation of criminal justice tools and technologies.
• Technology information and general and specialized technology assistance.
• Assistance in setting NIJ’s research agenda by convening practitioner-based advisory groups to help identify criminal justice technology needs and gaps.

JUSTNETNews

The National Law Enforcement and Corrections Technology Center (NLECTC) provides the Law Enforcement & Corrections Technology News Summary as a service to law enforcement, corrections, and forensic science practitioners. The Summary includes abstracts of articles from major national newspapers, business magazines, Web sites, national and international wire services, and periodicals focusing on law enforcement and corrections technology.

== NLECTC Centers of Excellence ==
The NLECTC system's regional centers, the Technology Centers of Excellence (CoE), and specialty offices work directly with United States Federal, State, and local government agencies; community leaders; and scientists to foster technological innovations that result in new products, services, systems, and strategies for America's criminal justice professionals.
