= Office of Juvenile Justice and Delinquency Prevention =

United States agency

- Seal of the United States Department of Justice

Bureau/Office overview
- Formed: 1974; 52 years ago
- Jurisdiction: Federal government of the United States
- Headquarters: 810 7th Street NW Washington, D.C., United States
- Bureau/Office executive: Liz Ryan, Administrator
- Parent department: Office of Justice Programs, U.S. Department of Justice
- Website: ojjdp.ojp.gov

The Office of Juvenile Justice and Delinquency Prevention (OJJDP) is an office under the Office of Justice Programs at the United States Department of Justice.

The office supports states, local communities and tribal jurisdictions in their efforts to develop and implement effective programs for juveniles. The office strives to strengthen the juvenile justice system's efforts to protect public safety, hold offenders accountable and provide services that address the needs of youth and their families. Through its components, OJJDP sponsors research; program and training initiatives; develops priorities and goals; sets policies to guide federal juvenile justice issues; disseminates information about juvenile justice issues, and awards funds to states to support local programming.

OJJDP also disseminates information about juvenile justice issues and awards funds to states to support local programming nationwide through the office's five organizational components. OJJDP publishes the Juvenile Residential Facility Census Databook (JRFCDB) on even numbered years, summarizing data on youth detention.

The office cooperates with other federal agencies on special projects. For example, it formed the National Gang Center along with OJP and the Bureau of Justice Assistance (BJA). OJJDP has the National Gang Center linked through the National Gang Center.

In January 2025, President Donald Trump appointed Eileen M. Garry as administrator. She currently leads the program in an acting capacity.
