= Office of Justice Programs =

US federal crime-prevention research arm

Office of Justice Programs (OJP)
- Seal of the United States Department of Justice, Office of Justice Programs

Department overview
- Formed: 1984; 42 years ago
- Jurisdiction: Federal government of the United States
- Headquarters: 810 7th Street NW Washington, D.C., United States
- Department executives: Vacant, Assistant Attorney General; Maureen Henneberg, Deputy Assistant Attorney General for Operations and Management
- Parent department: U.S. Department of Justice
- Website: www.ojp.gov

The Office of Justice Programs (OJP) is an agency of the United States Department of Justice that focuses on crime prevention through research and development, assistance to state, local, and tribal criminal justice agencies, including law enforcement, corrections, and juvenile justice through grants and assistance to crime victims.

The Office of Justice Programs is headed by an assistant attorney general. Brent Cohen is the acting assistant attorney general. OJP's Assistant Attorney General is responsible for the overall management and oversight of the office.

== History ==
In 1968, the Law Enforcement Assistance Administration (LEAA) was established under the Omnibus Crime Control and Safe Streets Act; LEAA was abolished in 1982. Its predecessor agency was the Office of Law Enforcement Assistance (1965–1968). The LEAA was succeeded by the Office of Justice Assistance, Research, and Statistics (1982–1984). In 1984, the Office of Justice Assistance, Research, and Statistics became the Office of Justice Programs with the enactment of the Justice Assistance Act of 1984.

== Organization ==
=== Leadership ===
- Office of the Assistant Attorney General

=== Program offices ===
- Bureau of Justice Assistance (BJA)
- Bureau of Justice Statistics (BJS)
- National Institute of Justice (NIJ)
- Office for Victims of Crime (OVC)
- Office of Juvenile Justice and Delinquency Prevention (OJJDP)
- Office of Sex Offender Sentencing, Monitoring, Apprehending, Registering, and Tracking (SMART)

=== Business offices ===
- Office of Administration (OA)
- Office of the Chief Financial Officer (OCFO)
- Office of the Chief Information Officer (OCIO)
- Office for Civil Rights (OCR)
- Office of General Counsel (OGC)
- Office of Communications (OCOM)
- Equal Employment Opportunity Office (EEO)
- Office of Audit, Assessment, and Management (OAAM)

== See also ==
- Sex offender registries in the United States
