= Office for Victims of Crime =

- Seal of the United States Department of Justice

- Logo of the Office for Victims of Crime

Bureau/Office overview
- Formed: 1988; 38 years ago
- Jurisdiction: Federal government of the United States
- Headquarters: 810 7th Street NW Washington, D.C., United States
- Bureau/Office executive: Kristina Rose, Director
- Parent department: Office of Justice Programs, U.S. Department of Justice
- Website: ovc.ojp.gov

The Office for Victims of Crime (OVC) is an office under the Office of Justice Programs at the United States Department of Justice.

The OVC's mission is to provide aid and promote justice for crime victims. The office was created in 1988 in an amendment to the Victims of Crime Act (VOCA) of 1984. OVC sponsors the annual Crime Victims' Rights Week that promotes victims' rights and services.

Jessica E. Hart was appointed to the role of Director by President Donald Trump and sworn in on March 31, 2020. She left office on January 20, 2021. Between January and July 2021, the office was led by Acting Director Katherine Darke Schmitt.

Kristina Rose is the current Director, appointed by President Joe Biden and sworn into the position on July 12, 2021. Rose previously served as acting director and deputy director for the National Institute of Justice, and as the Chief of Staff for the Office on Violence Against Women.
