= Bureau of Justice Assistance =

- Seal of the United States Department of Justice

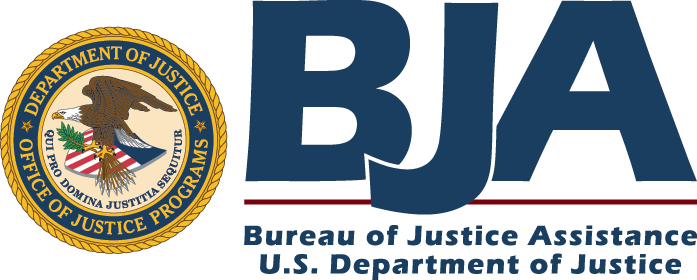
- Logo of the Bureau of Justice Assistance

Bureau/Office overview
- Formed: October 21, 1968; 57 years ago
- Jurisdiction: Federal government of the United States
- Headquarters: 810 7th Street NW Washington, D.C., United States
- Bureau/Office executive: Karhlton F. Moore, Director
- Parent department: Office of Justice Programs, U.S. Department of Justice
- Website: bja.ojp.gov

The Bureau of Justice Assistance (BJA) is a bureau under the Office of Justice Programs at the United States Department of Justice. It provides assistance to local criminal justice programs that improve and reinforce the nation's criminal justice system.

Deputy Director Tracey Trautman was named as Acting Director of the Bureau of Justice Assistance from January to December 2017, before President Donald Trump appointed Jon Adler to the Director role in December 2017. He resigned on September 16, 2019. Trautman was again named as Acting Director on September 16, 2019., serving in that role until March 2020. On March 9, 2020, President Trump nominated Mike Costigan to serve as Acting Director, in which role he remained until October 8, 2020. The next acting director was Kendel Ehrlich, sworn in on October 13, 2020, who served until January 20, 2021. Kristen Mahoney served as Acting Director from January 20, 2021 until February 28, 2022.

The current director, since February 28, 2022, is Karhlton F. Moore.

== Principles ==
- Emphasize local control.
- Build relationships in the field.
- Provide training and technical assistance in support of efforts to prevent crime, drug abuse, and violence at the national, state, and local levels.
- Develop collaborations and partnerships.
- Promote capacity building through planning.
- Streamline the administration of grants.
- Increase training and technical assistance.
- Create accountability of projects.
- Encourage innovation.
- Communicate the value of justice efforts to decision makers at every level.

== Mission statement ==
The mission of the Bureau of Justice Assistance is to provide leadership and services in grant administration and criminal justice policy development to support local, state, and tribal justice strategies to achieve safer communities.

== Goals ==
BJA's goals are to reduce and prevent crime, violence, and drug abuse and to improve the way in which the criminal justice system functions. In order to achieve such goals, BJA programs illustrate the coordination and cooperation of local, state, and federal governments. BJA works closely with programs that bolster law enforcement operations, expand drug courts, and provide benefits to safety officers.

== Organization ==
BJA has four primary components: Policy, Programs, Planning, and the Public Safety Officers' Benefits (PSOB) Office.

- The Policy Office provides national leadership in criminal justice policy, training, and technical assistance to further the administration of justice. It also acts as a liaison to national organizations that partner with BJA to set policy and help disseminate information on best and promising practices.
- The Programs Office coordinates and administers all state and local grant programs and acts as BJA's direct line of communication to states, territories, and tribal governments by providing assistance and coordinating resources.
- The Planning Office coordinates the planning, communications, and budget formulation and execution; provides overall BJA-wide coordination; and supports streamlining efforts.
- Public Safety Officers' Benefits (PSOB) Program supports the recent efforts taken by the nation's public safety agencies and law enforcement organizations to increase officer safety and wellness, including through policies that require public safety officers to use seat belts and body armor

== Programs Administered ==
- Anti-Human Trafficking Task Force Initiative
- Body-Worn Cameras (BWCs)
- Bulletproof Vest Partnership (BVP) Program
- Byrne Criminal Justice Innovation (BCJI)
- Community-Based Problem-Solving Criminal Justice Initiative
- Edward Byrne Memorial Justice Assistance Grant Program (JAG) Program
- Faith-Based and Community Initiatives
- Field-Initiated Program
- Global Justice Information Sharing Initiative (Global)
- Justice and Mental Health Collaboration Program (JMHCP)
- Justice Reinvestment Initiative (JRI)
- Law Enforcement Congressional Badge of Bravery (CBOB) Program
- National Gang Center
- Public Safety Officer Medal of Valor (MOV)
- Project Safe Neighborhoods (PSN)
- Second Chance Act (SCA)
- Sexual Assault Kit Initiatives (SAKI)
- Smart Policing Initiative (SPI)
- Violence Reduction Network (VRN)

== See also ==
- Nationwide Suspicious Activity Reporting Initiative
