= Police officer certification and licensure in the United States =

Requirements for law enforcement officers

In the United States, certification and licensure requirements for law enforcement officers vary significantly from state to state. Policing in the United States is highly fragmented, and there are no national minimum standards for licensing police officers in the U.S. Researchers say police are given far more training on use of firearms than on de-escalating provocative situations. On average, US officers spend around 21 weeks training before they are qualified to go on patrol, which is far less than in most other developed countries.

== Terminology ==
The agency that establishes standards for police officer selection, training, licensure, certification, and suspension/decertification is called the police officer standards and training (POST) commission in 15 states (as of 2004), including California, Arizona, and Nevada. In other states, the certification body goes by a different name, such as: Georgia Peace Officer Standards & Training Council, Kentucky Law Enforcement Council, Indiana Law Enforcement Training Board, Maryland Police and Corrections Training Commissions, Alaska Police Standards Council, and the Michigan Commission on Law Enforcement Standards.

== History ==
Although the Wickersham Commission established by President Herbert Hoover called in 1931 for the establishment of standards for police officers (including minimal training requirements, selection standards, physical standards, and police training before and during service), state standards for selecting and training police began to be adopted only in the latter half of the 20th century. Early advocates of professionalization and reform of police included August Vollmer of the Berkeley Police Department and O. W. Wilson of the Chicago Police Department.

The California Commission on Peace Officer Standards and Training (the first body to use the acronym "POST") was established in 1959. In the same year, New York enacted the New York Training Act, which established an advisory council to make recommendations on police training to the governor. In addition to California and New York, the states of Montana and Minnesota established their POST commissions in 1959. New Jersey, Oklahoma, and Oregon followed two years later. The 1967 Katzenbach Commission (President's Commission on Law Enforcement and Administration of Justice) and the 1973 National Advisory Commission on Criminal Justice Standards and Goals both encouraged establishment of a POST commission in each state to set minimum standards for selection, training, and certification. Between 1959 and 1976, 43 state police officer standards and training bodies were established. At the behest of the International Association of Chiefs of Police, the National Association of State Directors of Law Enforcement Training (NASDLET) was established in 1970; the association changed its name to the International Association of Directors of Law Enforcement Standards and Training (IADLEST) in 1987. The last states to establish commissions were Tennessee, West Virginia, and Hawaii.

== Powers and variation across states ==
Standards for police officers are not uniform; different states have different requirements. However, the International Association of Directors of Law Enforcement Standards and Training (IADLEST), a cooperative association of leaders of various state police certification and licensing programs, has published a recommended set of "model minimum state standards" in 2004. However, there is a substantial variations in standards. More progressive police departments place greater emphasis on accreditation.

=== Police training ===
==== Initial training (police academy) ====
A study in the year 2000 found that the minimum number of police training hours varied from 320 to 800. In some states, the minimal training time for officers set by state regulation is shorter than the training time to become a licensed barber, cosmetologist, or manicurist, although many police departments have training requirements in excess of the state minimum.

In some states, the standards and certification body also directly runs the police academy. A Bureau of Justice Statistics (BJS) study found that as of 2013, about 4.5% of U.S. state and local law enforcement training academies were operated by a state POST commission. The 2013 BJS study found that academies run by state POST agencies and colleges/universities were more likely to use a "nonstress" training model (based on "academic achievement, physical training, and a more relaxed and supportive instructor–trainee relationship") as opposed to a "stress" training model (a military-style training regime based on "intensive physical demands and psychological pressure"). This contrasts with academies run by police forces, which more often are based on a stress model. Although state POST commissions run only a small proportion of police academies, POST commission-run academies have larger faculty sizes: an average of 30 full-time instructors and 81 part-time instructors, as of 2006, according to a BJS report.

==== In-service training requirements ====
In some states, police officers are required to undergo continuing education ("in-service training") that is reported to and tracked by the state certifying body. Experts favor in-service training because it offers insights to police officers on newer research and best practices. However, in some states, in-service training requirements are minimal, and is frequently delivered online rather than hands-on. Moreover, in some states where continuing police education is mandatory, funding for training and mechanisms for tracking compliance are lacking.

==== Curricula ====
Police training curricula vary widely. Many police academies use military- or paramilitary-style training models; Rosa Brooks, an expert on policing training at Georgetown University Law Center, argues that this training model is harmful and contributes to the militarization of police.

Between 2014 and 2017, many state legislatures adopted legislation requiring police officers to receive crisis intervention and deescalation training, which has been demonstrated to reduce police use of force. As of 2017, however, 34 states do not require deescalation training for all police officers, and other states require minimal training in deescalation (for example, 1 hour per year in Georgia). While local departments can train officers in deescalation in the absence of a state mandate, many departments do not do so because of a lack of funding or trained instructors, and because of cultural attitudes among police and police leaders, such as the belief that such training is not necessary or is a criticism of policing itself. As of 2018, 27 states and District of Columbia require police officers to undergo training on interacting with individuals with mental, substance use, or behavioral disorders.

==== Gaps and flaws in training ====
Because there are no federal standards for officer firearms training, standards vary by state. In most states, officers do not receive firearms training sufficient for the proficient handling of guns in real-world scenarios. For police cadets, a total of 40 hours of initial firearms training is required in Georgia, Illinois and Indiana; 52 hours in Utah; 66 hours in Missouri; 80 hours in Florida; and 90 hours in Washington state. After initial graduation from police academy, most officers are qualified in minimal firearms proficiency only once or twice annually, and firearms skills degrade rapidly. Experts attribute these training gaps to a significant number of accidental shootings (unintentional discharges) by police officers. An Associated Press report found that there were 1,422 unintentional discharges by officers at 258 law enforcement agencies of all sizes between 2012 and December 2019, and that these unintentional discharges caused injuries (to officers, suspects and bystanders) 20% of the time and caused death 8% of the time.

Experts, such as police instructors and researchers, similarly identify training of U.S. police officers on the use-of-force techniques as inadequate. A two-year study conducted by the Force Science Institute, a Minnesota-based police research and consulting firm, found that "skills like using a baton or taking down an aggressive offender deteriorate dramatically within two weeks."

Police training in the United States has often been plagued by pseudoscience, junk science, and questionable science, with various common elements of police training being underpinned by misinformation, unsubstantiated claims, assumptions, and anecdotes. Many police practices taught in training are not evidence-based or supported by empirical research. For example, the "21-foot Tueller Drill"—based on the assumption that if a suspect is "any closer than 21 feet, the person could charge before an officer could unholster their gun"—is not scientific, and its creator has said the drill should not be taken literally; nevertheless, the drill is still commonly taught in police training as a science and has been used as an argument to justify police use of force. The American Society of Evidence-Based Policing and other experts proposed evidence-based policing and the creation of an "independent, nonpartisan body providing research and education to police departments" based on rigorous evidence.

=== Certification ===
Most states require a person to be certified before hired as a police officer; as of 2020, four states lacked a statewide police certification system, including Massachusetts, which established it at the end of 2020. As of 2009, 23 states with a certification process exempted certain personnel (usually elected sheriffs, and less commonly, police chiefs, state police officers, and reserve police officers) from the certification requirement.

In a minority of states, police certifying bodies also certify other public safety employees, such as correctional officers (23 states), parole officers and probation officers (21 states), Security Officers (21 states), and police dispatchers (15 states).

=== Decertification ===
By 1998, 11 states' commissions lacked decertification authority—the power to revoke a license to work as a police officer—largely because of police union opposition. By 2016, six states (Massachusetts, New York, New Jersey, Rhode Island, California and Hawaii) still lacked decertification authority. In a 2009 survey, almost all states reported that they had the authority to revoke an officer's certificate upon conviction of a felony; a smaller number of states reported that they had the authority to revoke an officer's certificate upon conviction of any misdemeanor or for certain misdemeanors. Entities in 36 states reported that they could administratively revoke an officer's certificate for police misconduct; and entities in 31 states reported that they had the authority to temporarily suspend an officer's certificate. Among states with decertification authority, all "can decertify for felony convictions, but only 61% can decertify for failure to meet training or qualification requirements, 57% for general misconduct, 39% for termination for cause, and 11% for any misdemeanor conviction."

States differ dramatically in the number of officers decertified. At least since the late 1990s, Georgia has been the most active state in decertifying "problem" officers. Over the period 2015–2019, Georgia decertified 3,239 officers, Minnesota decertified 21, and Maryland decertified only one.

In some states, the decertification process has drawn scrutiny because a lack of speed and transparency. In some states, a law enforcement agency must report the firing (or the firing for cause) of a police officer to the state certifying commission; in other states, a law enforcement agency only needs to report to the state certifying commission when an officer is arrested or convicted of a crime (or, in some states, a felony); and in some states, there is no notification obligation even under those circumstances. For example, in Maine, "Agencies must tell the state about officers arrested or convicted of a crime, as well as those fired or allowed to resign for misconduct." In Montana, law enforcement agencies are not required to report officer misconduct, but must notify the state commission of a termination of an officer within 10 days. In Indiana, there is "no requirement for agencies to inform the state about officer arrests or noncriminal misconduct allegations."

In 1999, IADLEST, with funding from the U.S. Department of Justice's Bureau of Justice Assistance, established the National Decertification Index (NDI), a database of decertified officers. As of 2005, only 13 states participated in the national decertification database; by 2018, that number rose to 43. The goal of the national index is to prevent officer decertified in one state from moving to a new state and obtaining certification and police employment in the new state. NDI has received no federal funding since 2005, and is privately maintained. The database does not contain the reasons for the decertification; a hit on a decertified officer's name will refer the person conducting the query to the specific agency that decertified the officer. Law professor Roger L. Goldman, an expert on police certification, notes that "Since the grounds for decertification vary greatly among U.S. states, the fact of decertification does not mean the officer is automatically ineligible to be an officer in the state to which he or she has moved. For example, in some states, conviction of a felony is the only grounds for decertification; whereas, in other states, the commission of specified misconduct, such as filing a false police report, could trigger decertification." As a result, an officer whose license is suspended in one state for misconduct, or even for conviction of a crime, may be able to find a police job in another state with laxer requirements. In its 1998 report Shielded from Justice: Police Brutality and Accountability in the United States, Human Rights Watch recommended that all states have decertification authority; that federal legislation should be adopted to create a database of state POSTs' records "so that 'problem' or abusive officers are not allowed to obtain law enforcement employment in a neighboring state"; and that decertification procedures "should be reinvigorated and fully funded." A 2015 AP investigation uncovered numerous incidents of police officers who were terminated or resigned from a police agency after being accused of sexual misconduct, were then rehired by a different policy agency, and were subsequently accused again of misconduct.

=== California ===
California has a POST Commission, with two advisory boards: the Peace Officer Standards Accountability Advisory Board and the Advisory Committee. From 2021-2023 the Electronic Frontier Foundation sued and won a case to make training materials public. California now posts online 38 course workbooks, other course resources, guidelines, and other publications, including many local documents.

=== Florida ===
A study of 98,000 Florida police officers over three decades (1988–2016), published in the Yale Law Journal in 2019, found that "wandering officers"—police officers terminated from one law enforcement agency for misconduct who then are hired by a different law enforcement agency—were about twice as likely to be fired for misconduct or to be the subject of a complaint alleging a "moral character violation" in their next police job. The study authors, Ben Grunwald and John Rappaport, concluded: "In any given year over the last three decades, an average of roughly 1,100 full-time law-enforcement officers in Florida walk the streets having been fired in the past, and almost 800 having been fired for misconduct, not counting the many who were fired and reinstated in arbitration. These officers, we have shown, are subsequently fired and subjected to 'moral character' complaints at elevated rates relative to both officers hired as rookies and veterans with clean professional histories. And we likely underestimate the prevalence of the phenomenon nationwide. We have, moreover, only a partial understanding of the extent of the problem wandering officers pose. Beyond their own misbehavior, wandering officers may undermine efforts to improve police culture, as they carry their baggage to new locales. Worse yet, wandering officers may 'infect' other officers upon arrival, causing misconduct to metastasize to the farthest reaches of the law-enforcement community."

=== Iowa ===
An Associated Press (AP) investigation in 2020 found that 17 officers were decertified in Iowa from 2018 to June 2020, mostly after being convicted of felonies, domestic violence, or certain other crimes in which removal is mandatory under Iowa law. Although removal is mandatory is such cases, the AP found that it was routine for a year or more to elapse, following officers' convictions, before the Iowa Law Enforcement Academy Council filed petitions seeking decertification, and that it was common for another year to go by for decertification to become final (after a hearing before an administrative law judge and a vote by the council). During the 2 1/2-year period, only a single Iowa officer had been "decertified for improper police work alone" (an officer who filed false reports and made an arrest without probable cause). Iowa enacted a law in June 2020 to strengthen the decertification process by, among other things, requiring the Iowa Law Enforcement Academy Council to decertify officers who engage in "serious misconduct" (such as fabricating evidence or repeatedly using excessive force) and by requiring police departments to report details of an officer's misconduct to the Iowa Law Enforcement Academy Council within 10 days after the officer resigns or is terminated.

=== Massachusetts ===
Massachusetts requires police officers to undergo 40 hours of in-service police training each year, one of the nation's highest requirements, and in 2020 established a statewide body overseeing compliance, and a 2019 state auditor report indicated that up to 30 police departments in the state might be out of compliance with the mandate.

The Massachusetts Police Reform Act of 2020, which passed on December 31, 2020, established the Massachusetts Peace Officer Standards and Training Commission. The Massachusetts Commission has the authority to decertify officers.

=== Washington State ===
In Washington state, the Washington State Justice Training Commission (WSJTC) gained the power of certification and decertification in 2002. However, the criteria for decertifying a police officer is extremely narrow, and police accountability is anemic. Officers can only be decertified in Washington state following a felony conviction or a firing for perjury or dishonesty; illegal drug use or possession; "actions that lead to a loss of gun rights"; or misconduct under color of authority. A Seattle Times analysis in 2020 showed that out of about 11,000 officers in the state over the preceding four years, 106 officers had been fired from 2016 to 2019, and 44 had been recommended by police supervisors for WSJTC, but only 10 officers were actually decertified. Thus, even officers fired after being convicted of misconduct-related misdemeanor crimes, or officers whose misconduct led to governments settling lawsuits for hundreds of thousands of dollars, were listed as being in "good standing" with the WSJTC. As of 2021, Washington state had never decertified an officer for using excessive force.

== See also ==
- Arizona Peace Officers Standards and Training Board
- Commission on Accreditation for Law Enforcement Agencies, a commission that accredits departments and agencies (not individual officers)
- Florida Criminal Justice Standards & Training Commission
- Indiana Law Enforcement Academy
- Minnesota Board of Peace Officer Standards and Training
- Texas Commission on Law Enforcement
- Police academies by country#United States
