= Minnesota Board of Peace Officer Standards and Training =

The Minnesota Board of Peace Officer Standards and Training (POST) is an administrative body of the State of Minnesota that sets regulations and controls the training and licensing of police officers. The Minnesota legislature replaced the Minnesota Peace Officer Training Board (MPOTB) with POST in 1977. Minnesota was the first U.S. state to introduce an occupational licensing system for law enforcement officers. The POST Executive Director reports to the board's 15 members which include 10 law enforcement officers, two educators and two members of the public, all appointed by the governor, plus the superintendent of the state Bureau of Criminal Apprehension, who serves ex officio.

Colleges and universities that offer training for police officers must be certified by the Board. The Board is responsible for the exams candidates must pass before they can become police officers in Minnesota. More than 80 percent of Minnesota's police officers receive their training through one of colleges or universities in the Minnesota State Colleges and Universities system.

POST is also tasked with revoking licenses of police officers found guilty of felony offences (automatic revocation), or other crimes or offensive conduct, but an investigative report showed that this happens much less frequently than similar-sized jurisdictions such as Oregon and describes POST as "lax oversight".

== Inquiry into the July 2016 killing of Philando Castile ==
On July 6, 2016, Philando Castile, a 32-year-old black man, was shot and killed by police officer Jeronimo Yanez during a routine traffic stop. The Board looked into the killing, and determined Yanez had only received a total of two hours of de-escalation training in his five years on the force. The killing stirred controversy, and the Board recommended creating a fund to modify police training to help prevent the kind of rapid escalation of the use of force seen in this killing. In 2017 Minnesota's Governor endorsed a recommendation the fund should be named in honor of Castile. The recommendation triggered opposition from the State's police officers. Bob Kroll, the outspoken leader of the Minneapolis police union, argued that the fund's name should honor police officers.

In July 2018 Teresa Nelson, legal director of the Minnesota branch of the American Civil Liberties Union (ACLU) published a report critical of Minnesota's investigations into the killing. Her criticisms included the recommendation that the Board have the authority to revoke police officer licenses.

The legislature changed the regulations to require police officers to undergo at least 16 hours of crisis intervention training.

== Star Tribune investigative reporting of October 2017 ==
On October 1, 2017, the Star Tribune of Minneapolis–Saint Paul published an investigative report into Minnesota police officers convicted of crimes who continued to work as police officers. The newspaper reported that, since 1995, more than 500 police officers had been convicted of crimes and continued to work as police officers because officers could only lose their licenses if convicted of felonies. Tim Bildsoe, the Board's chairman, said that the Board followed a 1970s-era model and called on Minnesota's legislature to increase the Board's authority over officers.

The Star Tribune compared Minnesota's Board with Georgia and Oregon's police certification boards. In Oregon any conviction can trigger a license revocation, and the report noted "Oregon which has fewer police than Minnesota, revokes about 35 licenses each year. Minnesota revokes one or two."

In Georgia, a license can be revoked for any act "which is indicative of bad moral character or untrustworthiness."

== Inquiry into the May 2020 murder of George Floyd ==
The May 25, 2020 murder of George Floyd by officers of the Minneapolis Police Department and subsequent worldwide protests triggered discussion on how to update police training.

Derek Chauvin, Tou Thao, Thomas K. Lane and James Alexander Kueng, the four officers with a role in Floyd's murder, were fired, and later criminally charged, but continued to hold licenses to work as police officers. According to the Star Tribune, the Board started a review of their licenses to work as police officers on June 17, 2020.

== Scholarly analysis ==
As the first board of its kind in the U.S., POST has been studied by scholars.

In 1984, Maria Pastoor criticized the Board's training on how to react to domestic violence. According to Pastoor, the training the Board oversaw defined domestic violence as a crime against the family, while using a "hierarchical family model" that placed males, and their interests, in an inherently superior position.

In 2009, Susan M. Hilal and Timothy E. Erickson of Metropolitan State University noted that no other state had required all police officers to earn a college degree.

== Future ==
The Board's chair, Kelly McCarthy, testified before a committee of the Minnesota House of Representatives, on July 1, 2020, about the many challenges the Board would face while adjusting to changing public attitudes on police accountability.

== See also ==
- Peace Officer Standards and Training
- Florida Criminal Justice Standards & Training Commission
