= Arizona Fourth Amendment Protection Act =

Proposed law

Arizona State Legislature
- Status: Not passed

The Arizona Fourth Amendment Protection Act is a bill proposed in the Arizona legislature that would withdraw state support for collection of metadata and ban the use of warrantless data in courts.

The bill was introduced into the Arizona Senate by Sen. Kelli Ward on January 22, 2014. It has multiple co-sponsors, including Senate President Andy Biggs.

The bill would "ban the state from engaging in activities which help the NSA carry out their warrantless data-collection programs, or even make use of the information on a local level."

== Content ==
The bill would amend Arizona Revised Statutes. Under the proposed legislation, Arizona would not

provide material support or assistance in any form to any federal agency that claims the power to collect, or comply with any federal law, rule, regulation or order that purports to authorize the collection of, electronic data or metadata of any person pursuant to any action that is not based on a warrant that particularly describes the person, place and thing to be searched or seized.

The bill further prohibits data obtained without a warrant from being used in Arizona courts.

The bill would also prohibit public universities within the state from being "NSA research facilities or recruiting grounds." The NSA has agreements with 166 schools, including two Arizona state universities.

== Discussion ==
Many lawmakers believed that in the wake of the Snowden disclosures, restoration of public trust would require legislative changes. More than 20 bills have been written with the goal of reining in government surveillance powers since the disclosures began in June 2013.

Ward explained her introduction of the bill, saying, "There is no question that the NSA program, as it is now being run, violates the Fourth Amendment. This is a way to stop it".

Media quoted Lyle Mann, director of the Arizona Peace Officers Standards and Training board, who opposes the bill, as saying "if they do nothing with the information, something bad is going to happen".

== See also ==
- Fourth Amendment to the United States Constitution
- Fourth Amendment Protection Act
