= Marshal =

Official titles in various branches of society

Marshal is a term used in several official titles in various branches of society. As marshals became trusted members of the courts of Medieval Europe, the title grew in reputation. During the last few centuries, it has been used for elevated offices, such as in military rank and civilian law enforcement.

In most countries, the rank of Marshal is the highest Army rank.

== Etymology ==
Marshal is an ancient loanword from Old French mareschal (cf. Modern French maréchal), which in turn is borrowed from Old Frankish *marskalk "stable boy, keeper, servant", attested by Medieval Latin mariscalcus from a Proto-Germanic *maraχskalkaz (cf. Old High German marahschalh) being still evident in Middle Dutch maerscalc, marscal, and in modern Dutch maarschalk (="military chief commander"; the meaning influenced by the French use).

It is cognate with Old High German mar(ah)-scalc "id.", modern German (Feld-)Marschall (="military chief commander"; the meaning again influenced by the French use).

It originally and literally meant "horse servant", a compound of *marha- "horse" (cf. English mare and modern German Mähre, meaning "horse of bad quality") and *skalk- "servant" (cf. Old English sċealc "servant, retainer, member of a crew" ) and outdated German Schalk, meaning "high-ranking servant". This "horse servant" origin is retained in the current French name for farrier: maréchal-ferrant.

The late Roman and Byzantine title of comes stabuli ("count of the stables") is similar in meaning, which became the Old French conestable and modern connétable, and, borrowed from the Old French, the English word constable. Finally, in Byzantium, a marshal with elevated authority, notably a borderlands military command, was also known as an exarch.

== Military ==
In many countries, the rank of marshal, cf. field marshal, is the highest army rank, outranking other general officers. The equivalent navy rank is often admiral of the fleet or grand admiral.

Marshals are typically, but not exclusively, appointed only in wartime. In many countries, especially in Europe, the special symbol of a marshal is a baton, and their insignia often incorporate batons.

In some countries, the term "marshal" is used instead of "general" in the higher air force ranks. The four highest Royal Air Force ranks are marshal of the Royal Air Force, air chief marshal, air marshal and air vice marshal (although the first named, which has generally been suspended as a peacetime rank, is the only one that can properly be considered a marshal). The five-star rank of marshal of the Air Force is used by some Commonwealth and Middle Eastern air forces.

In the French Army and most National Armies modelled on the French system, maréchal des logis ("marshal-of-lodgings") is a cavalry term equivalent to sergeant.

Some historical rulers have used special "marshal" titles to reward certain subjects. Though not strictly military ranks, these honorary titles have been exclusively bestowed upon successful military leaders, such as the famous grand marshal of Ayacucho Antonio José de Sucre. Most famous are the Marshals of France (Maréchaux de France), not least under Napoléon I. Another such title was that of Reichsmarschall, bestowed upon Hermann Göring by Adolf Hitler, although it was never a regular title since it had been invented for Göring, who was the only titleholder in history. In England during the First Barons' War the title Marshal of the Army of God and Holy Church was bestowed upon Robert Fitzwalter by election.

Both the Soviet Union and Russia have army general as well as "marshal" in their rank system.

=== Marshal ranks by country ===
The following articles discuss the rank of marshal as used by specific countries:

- Marshal of Bolivia
- Marshal (Brazil)
- Marshal of the Realm (Denmark)
- Marshal of Finland
- France
  - Marshal of France (includes Marshal of the Empire, both equivalent to a six-star general)
  - Maréchal des logis (equivalent to sergeant)
- Marshal of the German Democratic Republic
- Italy
  - Marshal of Italy
  - Marshal (Italy) – a warrant officer rank
- Marshal of the Mongolian People's Republic
- Marshal of Peru
- Marshal of Poland
- Marshal (Portugal)
- Mareșal (Romania)
- Russia
  - Marshal of the Russian Federation
  - Marshal of the Soviet Union
  - Chief marshal of the branch was used in five Soviet military branches: the air force, artillery, armoured troops, engineer troops, and signal troops.
  - Marshal of the branch was used in five Soviet military branches – the air force, artillery, armoured troops, engineer troops, and signal troops. Marshal of the branch is considered equivalent to the rank general of the army, which was used in the infantry and the marines.
- Marshal of the Realm (Sweden)
- Mareşal (Turkey)
- Marshal of the Royal Air Force
- Yugoslavia
  - Vojvoda (Serbia and Yugoslavia)
  - Marshal of Yugoslavia

=== Marshal equivalents ===
These ranks are considered the equivalent to a marshal:

- Chom Phon (Thailand)
- General of the army, fleet admiral and general of the Air Force (United States)
- Arteshbod (Iran)
- Mushir (Arab countries)
- Ispahsalar (Historical Islamic countries)
- Protostrator (in Frankish Greece, deriving from the Byzantine Empire, likewise deriving from the post of "stable-master")
- Stratarches (modern Greece)
- Vojvoda (Kingdom of Serbia and Kingdom of Yugoslavia)
- Vrhovnik (Croatia)
- Wonsu (North Korea and South Korea)
- Yuan Shuai (modern China)
- Sima (ancient China)
- Gensui (Japan)
- Nguyên soái (Vietnam)

=== Military police ===
The name is also applied to the leader of military police organizations.

- Provost marshal – a term used in many countries
- Provost Marshal General – head of the military police in the United States

== Ceremonial and protocol ==
Usually in monarchies, one or several of the senior dignitaries bear the title of Marshal or a compound such as Court Marshal (not related to court martial, therefore usually called Marshal of the Court to prevent confusion) or more rarely Grand Marshal.

The function of the Marshal of the Court varies according to national tradition, but frequently he is the chief of staff of the monarch's household (meaning the palace and other domains). Often the position also includes the honorary privilege as chief of the protocol of formally announcing the arrival of VIP guests at audiences, state dinners and conferences on the monarch's premises. This office was often made hereditary in the high nobility, e.g. the English Earl Marshal and the Scots Earl Marischal.

== Civilian ==
The term is also used in more ordinary contexts, such as modern pageantry; for example, the grand marshal of a parade is often an honored guest or dignitary.

In the United States, many colleges and universities have marshals. In some cases, there is a single "faculty marshal," appointed to the post on a more or less permanent basis. In other cases, there are one or several faculty marshals, and often one or several student marshals appointed for a single occasion. In all cases, the post is one of honor given to a senior faculty member or outstanding student, and the functions are generally limited to leading processions or parts of processions during commencement exercises, academic convocations, encaenia and similar events. These marshals often carry maces, staffs or wands of office.

A chief usher at a large wedding is sometimes called a wedding marshal. In addition to coordinating other ushers in attending guests, the wedding marshal may be a messenger between parties to signal the impending start of the service or communicate delays. In a church wedding, particularly a nuptial mass, these functions may be assumed by a verger. The wedding marshal is a position of honor and trust, often filled by a close friend or relative.

== Political ==
=== Dignitaries of Poland ===
Apart from its military uses, the Polish word marszałek (marshal) also refers to certain political offices:

- Marszałek Sejmu and Marszałek Senatu: the respective speakers of the lower house (Sejm) and upper house (Senate) of Poland's parliament, usually nominated by the governing party or coalition;
- Marszałek Województwa (voivodeship marshal): since 1999, the leader of the executive of a voivodeship (one of Poland's 16 provinces), elected by the regional assembly (sejmik), and co-existing with the government-appointed voivode (governor).

=== Demonstration marshal ===
Demonstration marshals, also called stewards, are used by the organizers of large or controversial demonstrations, rallies and protests, to help ensure the safety of the participants. They are especially important for preventing infiltration by agents provocateurs.

== Sports ==
In motorsports, such as auto racing, motorcycle racing, and rallying, the track marshals wave the racing flags and assist crashed or broken-down vehicles and their drivers, while pit marshals watch over the procedures in the pits, and fire marshals assist in the event of a fire on the track or in the pit. The FIA provides general rules and recommendations on marshalling. In the 1977 South African Grand Prix, 1977 Japanese Grand Prix, 2000 Italian Grand Prix, 2001 Australian Grand Prix, and 2013 Canadian Grand Prix, track marshals were victims of fatal accidents.

In some organized competitions, such as the "Tough Guy" endurance competition, officials seeing to the observance of the rules are styled marshals. In road running and cycling races, in particular, course marshals enforce rules of competition and assist runners as needed.

== Games ==
The marshal is the highest playing piece in the board game Stratego.

== Law enforcement ==
The word Maréchaussée derives from the French word Maréchal (plural Maréchaux), which was the second highest military rank in feudal France after Connétable (Constable), the military Commander-in-Chief of the Royal Armed Forces until 1627, when the rank of Constable was abolished. The Constable and the Marshals also had jurisdictional powers, at first only over members of the armed forces. The additional conferring of police powers led to the creation of the "Corps of the Maréchaussée" ("Marshalcy"; the forerunner of the modern Gendarmerie) and to an Ancien Régime Court of Justice called the Tribunal of the Constable and the Marshals of France, which judged military personnel and civilians alike in cases of petty violations of the law.

The term Maréchaussée was also used for the Continental Army's military police during the American Revolution.

In the present-day Netherlands, the Koninklijke Marechaussee ("Royal Marshalcy") is a national military police force with civilian powers, similar to the French Gendarmerie nationale.

== By country ==
=== Canada ===
In early 2025, the Government of Saskatchewan created the Saskatchewan Marshals Service. The provincial law enforcement agency is expected to focus on serious crime and will be fully operational in the fall of 2025.

=== France ===
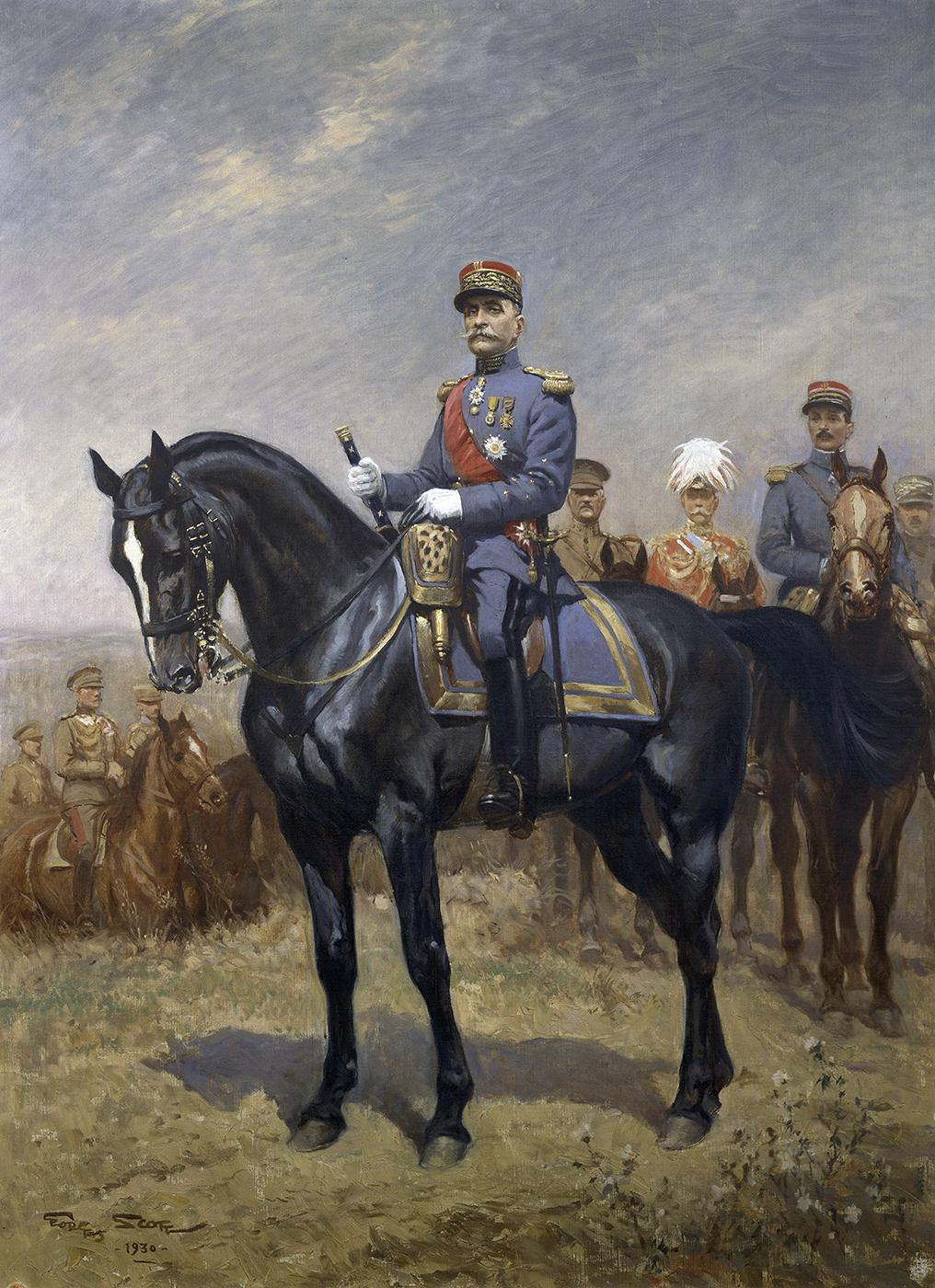
Marshal Foch, circa 1920.

In France, the Maréchaussée ("Marshalcy") was the forerunner of the French Gendarmerie. A military corps having such duties was first created in 1337, placed under the command of the Constable of France (the Commander-in-Chief of the Royal Armed Forces), and named the Connétablie. In 1627, after the abolition of the title of Connétable, it was put under the command of the "Marshals of France," and renamed the Maréchaussée. Its main mission was to protect the roads from highwaymen.

The Maréchaussée was a mounted military police force organised and equipped along military lines. The force wore uniforms similar to those of the dragoons of the regular army and carried the same muskets and sabres. While its existence ensured the relative safety of French rural districts and roads, the Maréchaussée was regarded in contemporary England (which had no effective police force of any nature) as a symbol of foreign tyranny.

In 1789, on the eve of the French Revolution, the Maréchaussée numbered 3,660 men divided into small detachments called brigades. By law dated 16 February 1791, this force was renamed the Gendarmerie Nationale, though at first its personnel remained unchanged. Later, many of them died under the guillotine, especially the members of the nobility.

The new designation "Gendarmerie" was derived from the term gens d'armes (gentlemen/people at arms) who were originally heavy cavalry regiments (called at first Ordonnances royales) which were part of the King's household, the equivalent of the English "Honourable Corps of Gentlemen at Arms".

The title "Marshal of France" is a Dignité d'État ("State Dignity") in the contemporary French Republic, not only a military rank. It is granted to generals for exceptional achievements, especially in times of war or national crisis.

However, the Marshal of France was one of the Great Officers of the Crown of France during the Ancien Régime and Bourbon Restoration and one of the Great Dignitaries of the Empire during the First French Empire and the Second French Empire (when the title was not "Marshal of France" but "Marshal of the Empire")

A Marshal of France displays seven stars and is equivalent to a five-star general in the armies of other countries. The marshal also receives a baton, a blue cylinder with stars, formerly fleurs-de-lis during the monarchy and Eagles during the First French Empire and Second French Empire. It has the Latin inscription: Terror belli, decus pacis, which means "terror in war, ornament in peace".

The position in the French Navy (Marine nationale) equivalent to the "Marshal of France" is called Amiral de France ("Admiral of France"). The title has not been conferred since 1869. Theoretically, the equivalent title in the French Air Force is Général de France ("General of France"), but it has never been conferred to anyone yet.

Six Marshals of France have been given the even more prestigious rank of "Marshal General of the King's Armies and Camps": Biron, Lesdiguières, Turenne, Villars, Saxe, and Soult. This particular rank and title no longer exists in present-day republican France.

=== Netherlands ===
In the Netherlands, the Koninklijke Marechaussee are the gendarmerie force created by King William I to replace the French gendarmerie on October 26, 1814. The word gendarmerie had gained a negative connotation, so William called the new force "marechaussée" (an alternate French word for gendarmerie). At that time, the marechaussee was part of the army (landmacht). The marechaussee performed police duties for the army, as well as civilian police work as a part of the national police (rijkspolitie). The marechaussee formed the only police force in many small cities like Venlo, especially in the southern provinces of Limburg and North Brabant. As of 1998, the marechaussee is a separate branch of the Dutch military, and is assigned both military and civilian police tasks.

=== United Kingdom ===
==== England ====
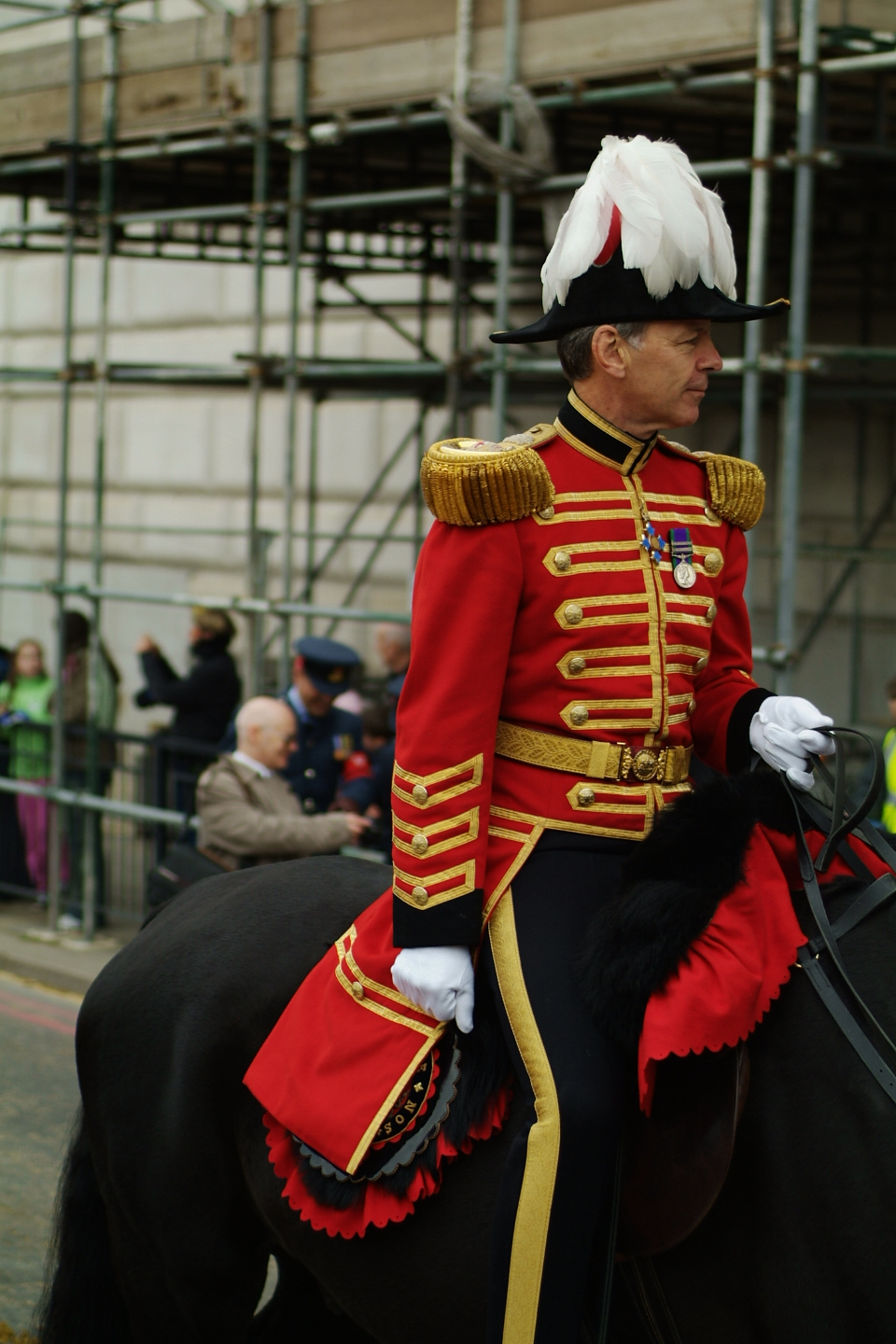
City Marshal of the City of London, on duty at the Lord Mayor's Show.

The hereditary title of "marshal" at one time designated the head of household security for the King of England. William Marshal, 1st Earl of Pembroke, served four kings in this office, ultimately becoming one of the most powerful men in Europe; by the time he died in 1219, people throughout Europe (not just England) referred to William Marshal simply as "the marshal". The office of hereditary Marshal (or Earl Marshal) thus evolved into that of a Great Officer of State.

The task of maintaining law and order within the king's court then devolved upon the office of Knight Marshal (established in 1236). Together with his officers, the King's (or Queen's) Marshalmen, the Knight Marshal continued to have restricted powers of arrest within a 12-mile (19 km) radius of the sovereign's palace until 1846, when the office was abolished.

In 1595, Queen Elizabeth I issued letters patent giving powers to a marshal to maintain order within the City of London. Later, an under-marshal and six city marshalmen were appointed to assist the marshal in his duties. As a result of the Police Acts of 1829 and 1839, the marshal's role changed significantly. As of 2009, one city marshal, currently Colonel Billy King-Harman, CBE, still acts as peacekeeper to the Lord Mayor of London, leading processions and representing the Lord Mayor at all Entries of Troops (challenging and then escorting those few regiments entitled to march though the City of London).

==== Scotland ====
The office of "Marischal of Scotland" (marascallus Scotie or marscallus Scotie) had been held heritably by the senior member of the Keith family since Hervey de Keith, who held the office of marischal under Malcolm IV and William I. The descendant of Herveus, Sir Robert de Keith (d. 1332), was confirmed in the office of "Great Marischal of Scotland" by Robert Bruce around 1324.

Robert de Keith's great-grandson, William, was raised to the peerage as Earl Marischal by James II in about 1458. The peerage died out when George Keith, the 10th Earl, forfeited it by joining the Jacobite Rising of 1715.

The marischal was to serve as custodian of the Royal Regalia of Scotland, and protect the king's person when attending parliament. The former duty was fulfilled by the 7th Earl during the Wars of the Three Kingdoms, who hid the Royal Regalia at Dunnottar Castle. The role of regulation of heraldry carried out by the English Earl Marshal is carried out in Scotland by the Lord Lyon King of Arms.

The separate office of Knight Marischal was first created for the Scottish coronation of Charles I in 1633. The office is not heritable, although it has been held by members of the Keith family.

=== United States ===
In the United States, marshal is used particularly for various types of law enforcement officers.

==== Federal marshals ====
The federal court system in the United States has 94 federal judicial districts, each with a court (with one or more judges), a United States Attorney with assistants such as prosecutors and government lawyers and a marshal, appointed by the president, in charge of federal law enforcement. The courts are part of the independent judicial branch of the government, while the marshals and U.S. attorneys are part of the Department of Justice in the executive branch. The U.S. marshal for the district primarily oversees court security and has a unit of appointed deputies and special deputies. (Other law enforcement operations and the federal prison system are handled by other federal police agencies.) The United States Marshals Service is a professional, civil service unit of federal police, part of the system of marshals, made up of career law enforcement personnel rather than the appointed district marshals. The U.S. Marshals Service assists with court security and prisoner transport, asset forfeiture, serves arrest warrants and seeks fugitives.

The Federal Air Marshal Service is a separate armed federal law enforcement service employed to protect commercial airliners from the threat of aircraft hijacking. These air marshals work for the Transportation Security Administration of the U.S. Department of Homeland Security.

The U.S. Supreme Court maintains its own, separate Marshal of the United States Supreme Court, who also controls the U.S. Supreme Court Police, a security police service answerable to the court itself, rather than to the president or attorney general. It handles security for the Supreme Court building and for the justices personally, and undertakes whatever other missions the court may require or assign.

==== State and local marshals ====
In many U.S. states, marshals can be found acting at the state, local or municipal level; marshals can be court bailiffs or process servers, or even fully sworn police officers. In some states, they may be sworn peace officers, however their job is, in certain cases, entirely civil rather than criminal law enforcement. In other states, some communities maintain a Town or City Marshal who is responsible for all general law enforcement within the respective jurisdiction, as well as court duties, while others are strictly court officers. This is especially true in communities with both police and marshals. The position of marshal vastly differs from state to state. At least one local railroad servicing company's part-time public safety staff, which are both fire and police trained, is supervised by a chief marshal.

American Old West (for example, Arizona Territory and Texas of the 1880s): Marshals, usually called town marshals or city marshals (since the larger cities were often punctilious about their titles), were appointed or elected police officers of small communities, with powers and duties similar to those of a police chief; these powers generally ended at the border of the community. By contrast, federal marshals (U.S. marshals) worked in a larger territory, especially in pioneer country, and this area could potentially overlap with the state or territorial office of county sheriff (who then, as now, policed communities, as well as areas between communities). The word marshal is still used in this sense, especially in the American Southwest. (See List of Western lawmen.) Town or city marshal is still the name for the head officer of some community police forces.

Arizona: Cities and towns decide whether to appoint or elect a marshal, or have the board, council, or city manager hire a chief of police as the top criminal law enforcement official for their jurisdiction (as in the town of Tombstone). Marshals are elected by the trustees to serve a fixed term, and chiefs of police can be fired at will by whoever hired them, just like any other employee.

California: Several urban counties (including Los Angeles, San Bernardino County, California, and San Diego) once maintained separate county marshal's offices, which served as court officers similar to U.S. marshals or constables, but mainly for the municipal court system. This system was abolished by state law in 2000, when the sheriffs of those counties announced that those counties' marshals would be absorbed into their departments. Therefore, many have been merged into or taken over by the local county sheriff's office, with the exceptions of Shasta County and Trinity County both located in Northern California. As of 2010, the marshal of San Benito County has been disbanded as an independent organization, with its employees becoming part of the sheriff's office. California also has fire marshals and deputy fire marshals, who may work for the State of California Fire Marshal's Office, or various county, city or special districts throughout the state. Fire marshals and deputy fire marshals are full-time sworn peace officers throughout the state, with powers of arrest statewide under section 830.37 of the California Penal Code. Their responsibilities include fire and arson investigation, bomb and explosives investigation, general law enforcement, as well as enforcement of the fire code.

Colorado: Cities, towns and villages decide whether to appoint or elect a marshal, or have the board, council, or city manager hire a chief of police as the top criminal law enforcement for their jurisdiction. Marshals are elected by the trustees to serve a fixed term, and chiefs of police can be fired at will by whoever hired them, just like any other employee.

Connecticut: In 2000, Connecticut eliminated the county sheriff system, and replaced it with two types of marshals. State marshals operate out of the executive branch of state government. They are sworn peace officers who perform a wide range of duties, including service of process, seizing money and property under court order, evictions, serving tax warrants, and arresting individuals on bench warrants. Judicial marshals are employed by the judicial branch. They are sworn peace officers who perform court security and transport detainees to and from court.

Georgia: The marshal is a commissioned armed and uniformed law enforcement officer of the county state courts which have jurisdiction over civil matters and state ordinances. In the Atlanta metro counties, marshal's offices enforce evictions, foreclosures, subpoenas, civil forfeitures, judgements, seizure, liens, repossession, and garnishment. With a few exceptions, elsewhere in Georgia, the sheriff's office is responsible for enforcement of these duties, with some sheriffs' offices having an assigned unit or personnel for these duties.

Indiana: Indiana Town Marshals are fully-sworn, ILEA certified police officers who act as the chief police officer of a town. General police terms in Indiana vary by what local government one works for; for example: counties have Sheriff's/deputies, cities have Police Departments/Officers and Towns have Marshals/deputies. In Indiana, a town is managed by a council without an elected mayor, whereas a city has a mayor and, thus, a city police department. Marshals are responsible for all law enforcement in their respective town, and their primary duties are the enforcement of local and state laws or ordinances as well as code enforcement. The Town Marshal may also be the town's humane law enforcement officer. Town marshals are fully sworn state certified police officers though the Indiana Law Enforcement Academy, having law enforcement authority statewide; therefore, it is not at all uncommon for Town Marshals to be seen outside of their bailiwicks assisting other police agencies. Some town marshal agencies in Indiana can be quite large. A Town Marshal can appoint any number of unpaid deputy town marshals or reserve officers who may exercise full police powers in the state. Indiana Town Marshals are authorized to enforce not only city/town code, but also county ordinances; this differs from city police departments where a city police officer may only enforce city code or a sheriff's deputy, who may only enforce county code. Indiana Code recognizes Town Marshals as Police Officers, therefore it is very common for Indiana Town Marshal's Offices to go simply by "Police Department" .

Under Indiana Code IC36-5-7 the marshal is described as "the chief police officer of the town and has the powers of other law enforcement officers in executing the orders of the legislative body and enforcing laws. The marshal or his deputy:

1. shall serve all process directed to him by the town court or legislative body;
2. shall arrest without process all persons who commit an offense within his view, take them before a court having jurisdiction, and detain them in custody until the cause of the arrest has been investigated;
3. shall suppress breaches of the peace;
4. may, if necessary, call the power of the town to his aid;
5. may execute search warrants and arrest warrants; and
6. may pursue and jail persons who commit an offense."

Maine: The State Marshal Service provides physical security and law enforcement duties to the judicial system, as well as protection of all state judges. Deputy marshals are fully sworn state law enforcement officers with statewide authority.

Missouri: There are two types of marshal:

State marshals provide physical security and law enforcement duties to the judicial system, as well as protection of all state judges. Deputy marshals are fully sworn state law enforcement officers with statewide authority.
City marshals, at the local level in the State of Missouri, are elected chief law enforcement officers of a city. They have the same police powers as a regular police officer within the city limits. The amount of training to be a city marshal is far less than a regular municipal police officer; as such, a marshal's jurisdiction is strictly limited to the city limits of the city to which they are elected. Even if they witness a violation of the law in their city, they cannot pursue a person who flees beyond the city limits. The position of city marshal is rare in the state of Missouri and is only found in very small rural cities that do not have the budget to maintain a police department.

Nevada

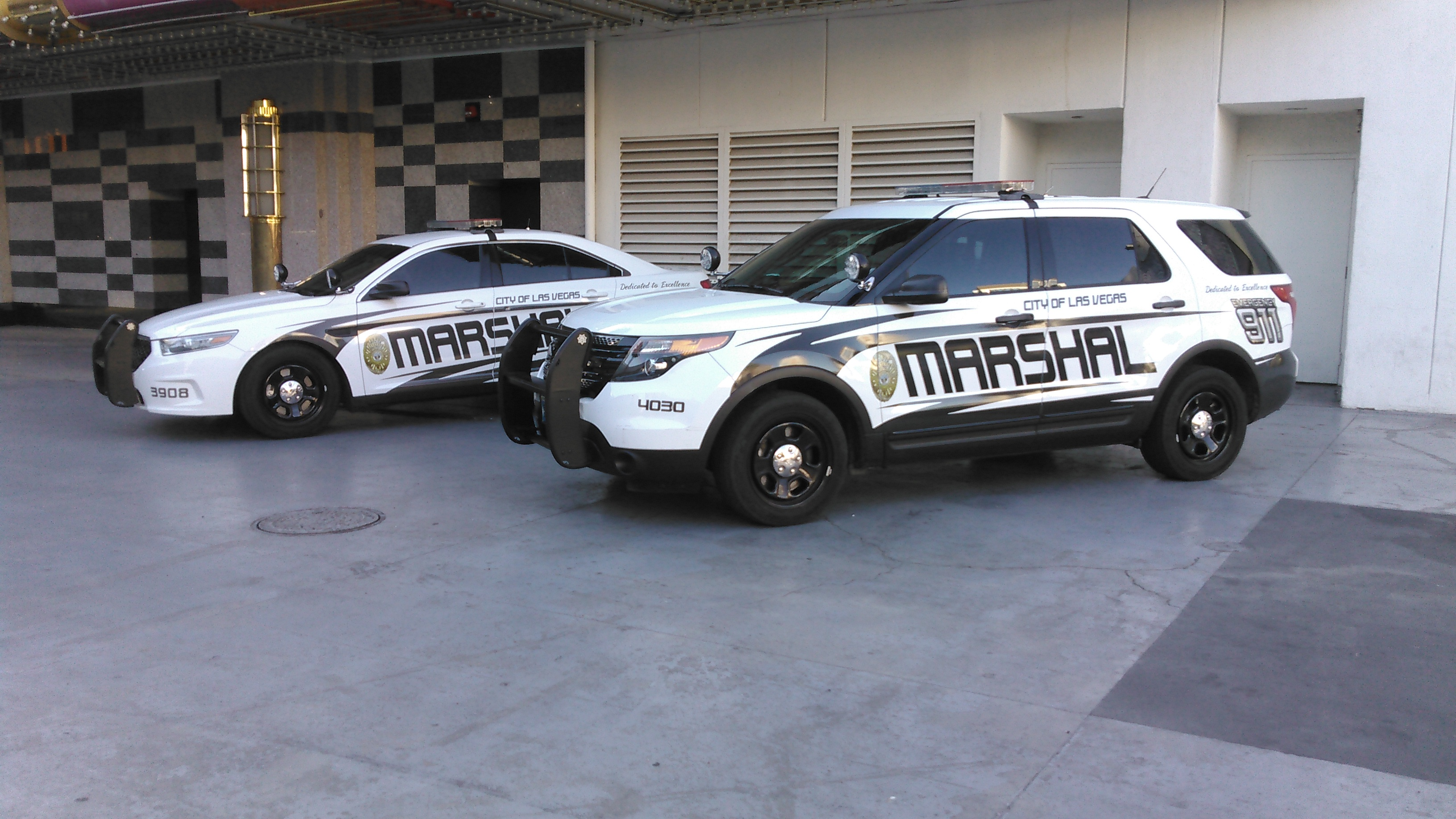
Las Vegas City Marshals units parked just outside of the Fremont Street Experience.

City marshals and deputy city marshals have, by law, the same authority as a municipal (town or city) police officer. However, those municipalities, such as Las Vegas, that have both a police force as well as a city marshal's office, often utilize the police as the general law enforcement agency of the municipality, while public property security and misdemeanor detention services are provided by the city marshal's office. In municipalities that do not have a police department, the county sheriff's office would serve as the agency that provides general law enforcement services to residents.

Las Vegas has two types of marshal:

Municipal court marshals who serve the municipal court by serving warrants and subpoenas and to make arrests for offenses under the jurisdiction of the municipal court; and to maintain order in the court and escort personnel to court and jail.
City marshals who provide law enforcement services to city employees, residents and tourists utilizing city facilities located within the city limits, specifically those located on property owned, leased, operated or otherwise under the control of the city of Las Vegas. Conduct special operations aimed at reducing certain criminal activity in specific areas of the city, for example, traffic enforcement in neighborhoods, abatement of illegal solicitors at intersections and the removal of abandoned vehicles. Conducting security and safety evaluations requested by city departments at various facilities, buildings and workplaces.

Henderson has Marshals as well:
Municipal Court Marshals work for the courts by serving warrants and to make arrests for offenses under the jurisdiction of the municipal court; and to maintain order in the court and escort personnel to court and jail.

New York: There are two levels of marshals:

City marshals are the elected chief law enforcement officers of a city or town. They have the same police powers as a regular police officer within the city limits. The amount of training to be a city marshal is far less than for a regular municipal police officer; as such a marshal's jurisdiction is strictly limited to the city limits of the city to which they are elected. Even if they witness a violation of the law in their city, they cannot pursue a person who flees beyond the city limits. The position of city marshal is rare in the State of New York and is now only found in very small rural cities that do not have the budget to maintain a police department.
New York City Marshals are appointed by the Mayor of New York City to five-year terms, but receive no salary from the city. The city's statutes specify that no more than 83 city marshals shall be appointed by a mayor. Marshals primarily enforce orders from civil court cases, including collecting on judgments, towing, seizing utility meters and carrying out evictions. Marshals collectively perform approximately 25,000 evictions per year. They are regulated by the NYC Department of Investigation but, unlike the city sheriff, they are not city employees. Marshals collect fees, which are set by statute, from private litigants when they are called on to enforce judgments, and they also retain five percent of any money they collect on judgments. City marshals may, depending on the court order brought to them by the winning litigant, seize money, movable property (for instance, inventory from a business), vehicles; as is the case with unpaid parking tickets, and return possession of rental premises to the landlord, (also known as eviction), and more. On an annual basis city marshals must pay the City of New York $1,500 plus 4.5 percent of the fees they receive for collecting judgments.

Ohio: The term village marshal has been used for the same function, often filled without colleagues, directly under the mayor.

Texas: City marshals and deputy city marshals have, by law, the same authority as a municipal (village, town, or city) police officer. However, municipalities (like Fort Worth), that have both a police force as well as a city marshal's office, often utilize the police as the general law enforcement agency of the municipality, while court security and process service is provided by the city marshal's office. In municipalities that do not have a police department, the city marshal's office sometimes serves as the agency that provides general law enforcement services to residents.

Washington State: The city of Seattle employs marshals in their municipal court, with the senior officer holding the title of chief marshal and the subordinate officers known as deputy marshals. Seattle Marshals provide court security and law enforcement services within the court. They handle arrests of out-of-custody defendants within the courthouse and transport in custody defendants to and from court hearings. The King County Sheriff's Office (county seat in Seattle) also employs court marshals, which is a unit under the sheriff's office. In the Old-West themed town of Winthrop, the municipal police force is headed by a town marshal, consistent with the Old West restoration of the buildings and tourist attractions.

Wisconsin:The village marshal shall execute and file an official bond. The marshal shall possess the powers, enjoy the privileges and be subject to the liabilities conferred and imposed by law upon constables, and be taken as included in all writs and papers addressed to constables. The marshal shall obey all lawful written orders of the village board. The marshal is entitled to the same fees prescribed for sheriffs in s. 814.70 for similar services, unless a higher fee is applicable under s. 814.705 (1) (c); for other service rendered the village, compensation as the board fixes.

61.28(2) (2) A village marshal who is given law enforcement duties by the village board, and who meets the definition of a law enforcement officer under s. 165.85 (2) (c), shall comply with the minimum employment standards for law enforcement officers established by the law enforcement standards board and shall complete training under s. 165.85 (4) (a) 1. .

== See also ==
- Earl Marshal
- Generalissimo
- Constable
- Sheriff
- Seneschal
- Fire marshal
- Magister equitum
- Mareșal (tank destroyer)
