= SPPD =

SPPD may refer to:

- Saint Paul Police Department, the abbreviation for the Saint Paul Police Department.
- St. Petersburg Police Department, the abbreviation for the St. Petersburg Police Department.
- San Paro Police Department, the abbreviation for the fictional San Paro Police Department on the APB Reloaded game.
- South Park: Phone Destroyer, the abbreviation for the free-to-play collectible card game developed by Ubisoft RedLynx.
