= ILEA =

ILEA may refer to:

- Indiana Law Enforcement Academy
- Inner London Education Authority
- International Law Enforcement Academies
