= Night Prosecutor's Program =

Columbus' prosecutorial diversion program

The Night Prosecutor's Program was a prosecutorial diversion program in Columbus, Ohio. Through this, law professors and law students served as "intake counselors" who processed cases and decided whether they should be referred for prosecution or go into the mediation process. Social work, psychology and seminary students were brought in to work with the law students, adding a counseling component. It won many awards and served as a model for more than fifty similar programs in several other states. It was designated as an Exemplary Project by the Law Enforcement Assistance Administration (which is now the National Institute of Justice).
