= Indiana Law Enforcement Academy =

Coordinates: 39°41′2.38″N 86°24′12.29″W

- Abbreviation: ILEA
- Motto: For All the People

Agency overview
- Formed: January 6, 1975; 51 years ago
- Employees: 51

Jurisdictional structure
- Operations jurisdiction: Indiana, USA
- State of Indiana
- Area: 36,418 sq mi (94,321 km^{2})
- Population: 6,619,680 (2015 est.)
- Legal jurisdiction: (Indiana) Statewide
- Governing body: Governor of Indiana
- General nature: Civilian police

Operational structure
- Overseen by: Law Enforcement Training Board
- Headquarters: 5402 South County Road 700E; Plainfield, Indiana
- Instructors: 13
- Agency executives: Timothy M. Horty, Executive Director; Bryant Orem & Jennifer Fults, Deputy Director; Mark A. Bridge, Basic Course Commander

Website
- http://www.in.gov/ilea/

The Indiana Law Enforcement Academy (ILEA) is a law enforcement training academy located in Plainfield, Indiana. The governing body of the academy is the 17-member Law Enforcement Training Board who are appointed by the governor. The board sets the requirements and criteria for the basic training of law enforcement officers throughout the state, which became mandatory on July 6, 1972. The academy offers basic training for new police officers, jail officers, and town marshals. It also offers in-service training for police officers and executive training for police chiefs.

The basic training course for new police officers consists of over 600 hours of training. Major areas of instruction include criminal and traffic law, firearms, emergency vehicle operations, physical tactics, EMS awareness and human behavior. Officers are also required to study other police related subjects such as accident investigation, criminal investigation, domestic violence and sexual assault, water rescue training, Standardized Field Sobriety Test, crime prevention and drug and narcotics.

In addition to the main training academy in Plainfield, six satellite facilities are certified by the board to offer training courses throughout the state:

- Fort Wayne Police Academy – Fort Wayne
- Indiana State Police Academy at ILEA – Plainfield
- Indiana University Police Academy – Bloomington
- Indianapolis Metropolitan Police Academy – Indianapolis
- Northern Indiana Law Enforcement Academy (NILEA) – Valparaiso
- Southwest Indiana Law Enforcement Academy (SWILEA) – Evansville

== See also ==
- Law enforcement agencies in Indiana
- Florida Criminal Justice Standards & Training Commission
