= Fourth Amendment Protection Act =

US laws limiting cooperation with federal mass surveillance

The Fourth Amendment Protection Acts, are a collection of state legislation aimed at withdrawing state support for bulk data (metadata) collection and ban the use of warrant-less data in state courts. They are proposed nullification laws that, if enacted as law, would prohibit the state governments from co-operating with the National Security Agency, whose mass surveillance efforts are seen as unconstitutional by the proposals' proponents. Specific examples include the Kansas Fourth Amendment Preservation and Protection Act and the Arizona Fourth Amendment Protection Act. The original proposals were made in 2013 and 2014 by legislators in the American states of Utah, Washington, Arizona, Kansas, Missouri, Oklahoma and California. Some of the bills would require a warrant before information could be released, whereas others would forbid state universities from doing NSA research or hosting NSA recruiters, or prevent the provision of services such as water to NSA facilities.

== History ==
The events of the 9/11 terrorist attacks led to some sweeping changes in national security policies. Through the enactment of Title II: Enhanced Surveillance Procedures of the USA PATRIOT Act of 2001, many government agencies were granted increased power of surveillance. Controversy arose from the increased surveillance that was granted. Proponents of the act argued that the increased surveillance measures were necessary for the protection and safety of the country, while detractors argued that the increased power of surveillance infringed upon Fourth Amendment protections.

Among the controversial programs that were put into place was the President's Surveillance Program, which embodied the Terrorist Surveillance Program. Through this surveillance program, President George W. Bush authorized the NSA to wiretap international calls where one party was suspected of having affiliations with Al Qaeda. It also reportedly allowed for data mining of emails, internet activity, text messaging and telephone call records, stored in a NSA call database.

The Terrorist Surveillance Program became publicly known after several NSA whistleblowers, William E. Binney, Ed Loomis, Thomas A. Drake and J. Kirk Wiebe, came forward with information about the agency's database collection program, Trailblazer, which eliminated the privacy protections for U.S. citizens that its predecessor, the ThinThread Project, promised. The information presented by Binney, Loomis, Drake and Wiebe brought the controversial practices of the NSA to the public eye, further inciting the controversy around the increased power that government agencies were granted. Information continued to come forward through many national news sources over the next several years about continuation of data collection programs carried out by government agencies.

In 2013, former NSA whistle-blower, Edward Snowden, came forward with information about continued surveillance on US Citizens through the PRISM surveillance project, that allowed the NSA to collect communications from providers like Google Inc., Yahoo and Verizon among others. Collected data was stored in the NSA database Boundless Informant and collected through the NSA Analytical tool XKeyscore, which allowed for the collection of most any form of data, from emails, to social media, and web browsing history. Snowden's revelations and released documents detailed that the NSA's data collection programs were much broader, deeper, and insidious than previously released information had shown, and included collection of data even from users of Xbox Live, World of Warcraft and Second Life, as well as NSA agents spying on their own love interests.

In 2014, former U.S. State Department whistle-blower, John Tye, wrote an opinion piece in the Washington Post, outlining his concerns over data collection under Executive Order 12333. Part 2.3 (i) allows that "incidentally obtained information that may indicate involvement in activities that may violate federal, state, local or foreign laws" may be collected, retained and disseminated.

In light of all of the information that came out over the previous 12–13 years, many states began invoking their Tenth Amendment rights to propose and enact Fourth Amendment Protection Acts in order to stop NSA collection within those states, or to disallow any unconstitutionally collected data to be utilized in state courts. Some states proposed actions to stop NSA Centers from accessing state controlled utilities, such as water and electricity, in an effort to block NSA data collections from within the state.

== Fourth Amendment Protection Act by state ==
=== California ===
On January 6, 2014, the state of California proposed Senate Bill 828 (2013–14). It was introduced by senators Ted Lieu and Joel Anderson, with the intention of adding Chapter 32.5 (commencing with Section 7599) to the state government's code. Its intention aimed to prohibit providing any resources, participation, or aid of any sort to requests made by federal agencies that attempt to collect metadata by means in which the state finds illegal. Furthermore, it would prohibit agencies such as the NSA from using public universities as recruitment centers, as well as prohibiting such agencies from performing research on campus grounds. On November 30, 2014, it was approved by the governor and was accepted into California State law.

=== Washington ===
In the state of Washington, multiple bills have been proposed in order to offer protections from certain NSA data collection operations. Specifically, those conducted without warrants. In 2017, House Bill 1193 (2017–18) was introduced, and given its first reading on January 13. Its primary intention was to prevent the use of data and online information obtained without a proper warrant from being used as evidence against individuals being prosecuted in a court of law. It would also prohibit the utilization of state resources and services for data collection operations that the state deems unconstitutional. In addition, any persons or corporations found to have been providing services to federal agencies for unconstitutional purposes would be guilty of misdemeanors. As of 2018, the bill remains in committee. An earlier version of the bill was proposed in 2013 as House Bill 2272.

=== Arizona ===
Similar to California's Fourth Amendment Protection Act, Arizona State had also proposed their own protections under Senate Bill 1156 (2014). It was supported by many members of the Senate, including its president at the time, Andy Biggs. In Arizona, it would have prevented digital information obtained without a warrant from being used in court, prohibited federal agencies from using state funding to carry out data collection without proper warrants, and eliminated numerous gray areas not mentioned in the Fourth Amendment. It was intended to go into effect on January 1, 2015. However, this bill did not pass.

== Federal Level ==
On June 2, 2015, President Barack Obama signed a revised version of the USA Freedom Act. Under Section 215 the mass collection of phone data was no longer allowed. Phone records could now be obtained only through the Federal Courts. Companies also now had the ability to publicly report the number of records requests they had received, making it even harder for massive amounts of information to be requested. This was the first time such protections were added for citizens since the attacks on September 11, 2001. Many Americans had concerns after Snowden's information leaks, causing data privacy and security concerns to become much larger and widely discussed issues. Still, others in government, such as Senate Leader Mitch McConnell, were pushing for more terrorism protections and would realize that this bill, while losing some ground on their end, was still their best chance, as protections granted from the previous bill had already expired.

Even as the Government was adding privacy protections, the advancements in technology were making surveillance practices easier. Devices such as satellites, cell phones, smart cars, smart-grid power reading, smart televisions, drones and automatic license place readers, to name a few, were becoming more and more prevalent in the surveillance world and the ways that information is gathered. New technology such as stingray surveillance technology is now used to create a more prominent signal for devices to gain connectivity to the internet, or cell phone towers, which, in turn, grants access to the information stored on connected devices. These types of devices have been used by many law enforcement agencies, growing the public's concern, and need for more privacy protection laws.

Two large technology companies, Microsoft and Apple, were involved in litigation with the US Government in 2016 on the basis of protecting the privacy of their consumers. In February 2016 Bill Gates, co-founder of Microsoft, filed a lawsuit against the US Government for breaking the US Constitution by not allowing Microsoft to "inform their customers when federal agencies sought their information." Apple was involved in court proceedings in relations to a cell phone connected to a mass shooting in December 2015. The FBI was requesting that they unlock an encrypted cell phone so that they could gain access to the phone. This would have required Apple to write new software to bypass the password encryption on the phone. Apple felt that by doing this for this case, they would be opening this up for future cases, and removing the security of the password on the cell phones.

The Supreme Court was involved in another case involving a string of robberies throughout Michigan and Ohio. A self-confessed robber in the case, gave the name and cell phone number of Timothy Carpenter to FBI agents, stating that he was involved. The FBI was able to use the location records of Timothy's cell phone to place him near the crimes, of which he was later convicted of aiding and abetting. His attorneys had argued that the cell phone records were not legally able to be used as evidence, due to lack of search warrant. However, the court had ruled that the cell phone data was not protected. After appeals, the final ruling was that "the records in this case fall on the unprotected side of the Fourth Amendment." Chief Justice John Roberts was later quoted as saying, "[...]some of the courts most challenging cases involve applying long held rules created by the courts to quickly developing technology."

S. 139 was introduced on January 12, 2017, sponsored by Senator Orrin G. Hatch. The bill will continue Section 702 of the Foreign Intelligence Surveillance Act that allows the NSA and FBI to further continue warrantless access to personal social media and conversation activities of foreigners to America, that also involves U.S. citizens' private communications, for an additional six years. The S. 139 bill has made minor key changes to potentially enhance more effective ways to protect privacy in the United States while still tracking possible terrorist attacks. A few changes will now require the Foreign Intelligence Surveillance Court to approve specified query procedures every year, as well as have the Inspector General of the Department of Justice overlook the query procedures and practices of the FBI, and have limited use of Section 702 to not allow information found to be used against U.S. citizens for criminal cases. Section 702 originally expired on December 31, 2017, but was then continued until January 19, 2018, where the vote ruled in favor of the extension by 256–164. President Donald Trump signed to enact S. 139 which became Public Law No: 115-118 that same day. On November 29, 2017, H.R. 4478 FISA Reauthorization Act of 2017, was introduced, sponsored by Republican Devin Nunes to extend Section 702. Representatives Justin Amish and Zoe Lofgren offered the USA Rights Act, pertaining a more balanced scale between security and liberty as this bill protects the 4th amendment along with eliminating the warrantless backdoor searches, that would then require government officials to obtain warrants in order to seize and view American citizens' data when the NSA and FBI tack into foreigner activities seeking any relations to terrorism. The bill resulted as a loss by a vote of 183–233.

== See also ==
- Fourth Amendment to the United States Constitution
- Arizona Fourth Amendment Protection Act
