= Arizona Peace Officers Standards and Training Board =

Law enforcement agency

Arizona Peace Officer Standards and Training Board
Agency overview
- Formed: July 1, 1968; 58 years ago
- Jurisdiction: Arizona
- Headquarters: 2643 E. University Drive, Phoenix, Arizona, 85034
- Agency executive: Matt Giordano, Executive Director
- Parent agency: State of Arizona
- Website: post.az.gov

The Arizona Peace Officers Standards and Training board is the agency responsible for the training of Arizona law enforcement.

== Overview ==
The Board was formed on July 1, 1968, as the Arizona Law Enforcement Officer Advisory Council, with a change of name on July 17, 1994.

The current composition of the Board in statute is 13 members. These include:

1. One sheriff from a county with more than 200,000 population.

2. One sheriff from a county with a population of less than 200,000.

3. One chief of police from a city with more than 60,000 population.

4. One chief of police from a city with less than 60,000 population.

5. A college faculty member in public administration or a related field.

6. The Arizona Attorney General.

7. The Director of the Arizona Department of Public Safety.

8. Two public members.

9. The Director of the Arizona Department of Corrections.

10. Two members who are either patrol officers or sergeants with the caveat that one must be from a municipal agency and the other from a sheriff's office.

The Board sets standards of training and handles certification cases resulting from peace officer discipline in the State of Arizona.

== See also ==
- Florida Criminal Justice Standards & Training Commission
