= Marshalcy =

Marshalcy (or occasionally maréchaussée or marechaussee) may refer to:

- The office and rank of a marshal
- Any gendarmerie or military force component with jurisdiction in civil law enforcement
  - Maréchaussée, the French Ancien Régime military police force
  - Royal Marechaussee, the military police force of the Netherlands
- Maréchaussée (Grimm), the 12th episode of season 4 of the television series Grimm

== See also ==
- Marshalsea, a former prison, London
