= Law Enforcement Assistance Administration =

Defunct US federal body

Agency overview
- Formed: 1968
- Preceding agency: Office of Law Enforcement Assistance
- Dissolved: 1988
- Parent department: United States Department of Justice

The Law Enforcement Assistance Administration (LEAA) was a U.S. federal agency within the United States Department of Justice. It administered federal funding to state and local law enforcement agencies and funded educational programs, research, state planning agencies, and local crime initiatives as part of President Lyndon B. Johnson's "war on crime" program.

== History ==
The LEAA was established by the Omnibus Crime Control and Safe Streets Act of 1968 and was abolished in 1982. Its predecessor agency was the Office of Law Enforcement Assistance (1965–1968). Its successor agencies were the Office of Justice Assistance, Research, and Statistics (1982–1984) and the Office of Justice Programs.

The LEAA included the National Institute of Law Enforcement and Criminal Justice, which had its functions absorbed by the National Institute of Justice on December 27, 1979, with passage of the Justice System Improvement Act of 1979. The Act, which amended the Omnibus Crime Control and Safe Streets Act of 1968, also led to creation of the Bureau of Justice Statistics. LEAA included the National Advisory Commission on Criminal Justice Standards and Goals.

The LEAA was criticized for various reasons, including mismanagement of funds, concerns about exacerbating police militarization, and not effectively reducing crime. In response to these criticisms and changing political and fiscal priorities, the LEAA was phased out and eventually abolished by the Omnibus Crime Control and Safe Streets Act Amendments of 1981. Its functions were absorbed by other parts of the Department of Justice.

== Initiatives ==
In March 1973, the LEAA ordered any police department receiving federal funding to end minimum height requirements, which most women could not meet. Throughout the 1970s and 1980s, the LEAA promoted policing initiatives such as the STRESS (Stop the Robberies, Enjoy Safe Streets) in Detroit and CRASH (Community Resources Against Street Hoodlums) in Los Angeles.
