= Humane law enforcement =

Enforcement of laws relating to the humane treatment of animals

Humane law enforcement is the enforcement of laws relating to the humane treatment of non-human animals.

== Agencies and personnel ==
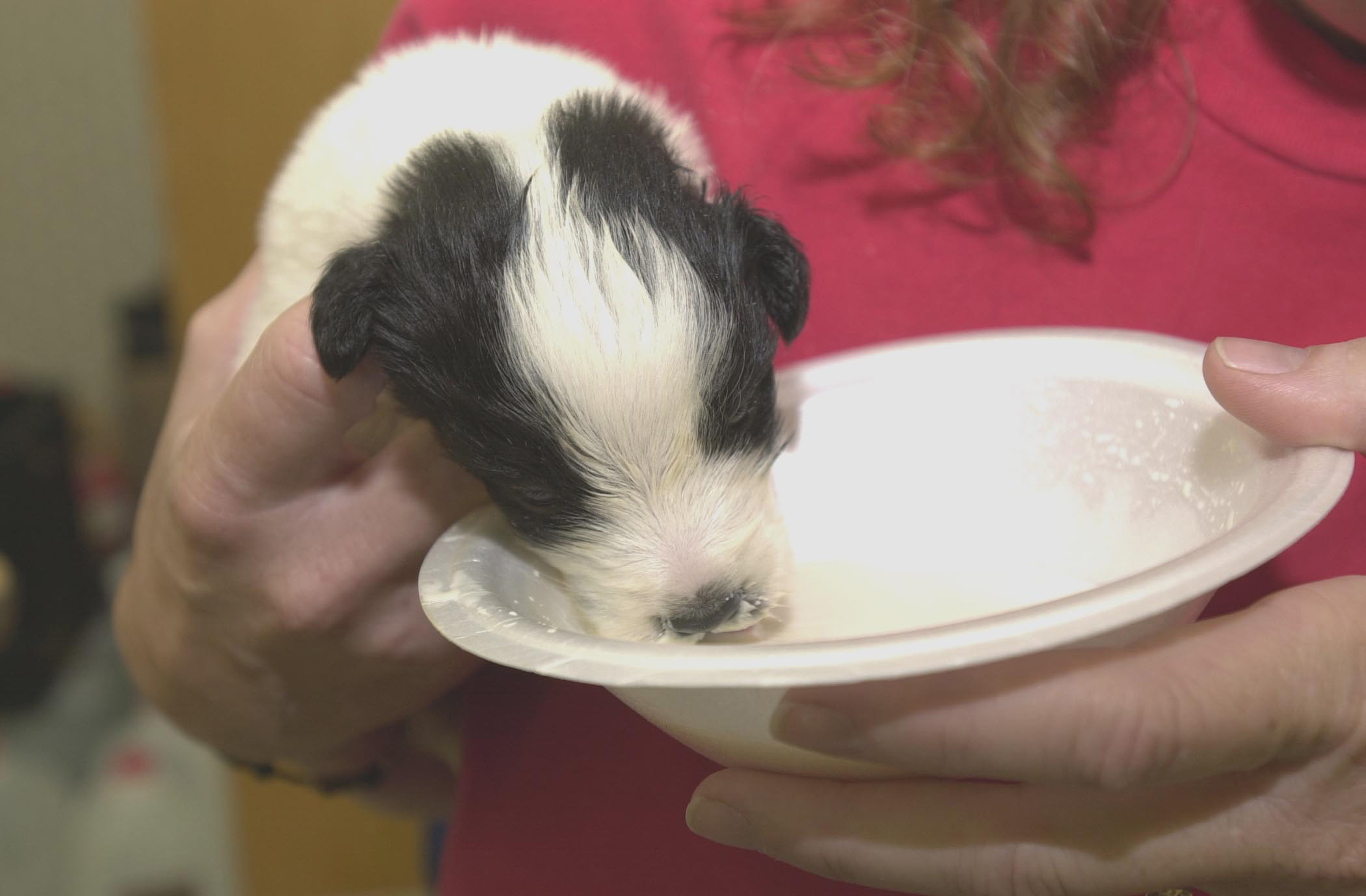

Humane Police Officers can be employed by Government Agencies, Humane Societies or SPCA.

In Pennsylvania Humane or SPCA Police are under the authority of the Pennsylvania State Department of Agriculture and under the direction of the County District Attorney. Pennsylvania Humane Police Officers are sworn officers, authorized to carry a firearm with arrest, search, and therefore are covered under the Federal LEOSA or HR 218.

In New York, SPCA Police are under the authority of the County District Attorney. They are authorized to carry a firearm, with powers of arrest, search, and seizure. They are also LEOSA Qualified and titled as "Peace Officers "

Several states including Ohio, Florida, California, Massachusetts, New Jersey, New York and Pennsylvania, Humane Society Police Officers, drive and use standard police vehicles equipped with red and blue lights, siren, and radios to communicate with county wide dispatch services. Humane Society and SPCA Police respond to 911 complaints regarding animal cruelty.

All Humane Society Police Officers are Sworn Law Enforcement Officers, such as New York and Pennsylvania. In New York, SPCA are given "Peace Officer Status", in Pennsylvania, Humane Society Police Officers are granted Authority by PA Statues 22, and being sworn in by a County Judge, and under the Authority and powers of the County District Attorney as a Humane Society Police Officer.

Humane law enforcement officers and depending on the statues for their state, are sometimes referred to as "HLEOs" in some jurisdictions or HSPO, Humane Society Police Officers) are generally members of a state or local society for the prevention of cruelty to animals (SPCA) or a state or local police department and as such are generally trained and certified alongside other police and law enforcement officers at a state or local police training academy. Depending on the jurisdiction, HLEOs are also be sworn and/or commissioned officers with police officer status, (NY and Pennsylvania) empowered with the appropriate law enforcement authority to effect arrests with or without warrant, sign complaints and issue court summonses, conduct searches and seizures, and carry weapons including a firearm, especially if trained and certified through a police training academy. Humane law enforcement may be performed by government agencies, private agencies, or both, depending on the jurisdiction.

There are many different agencies that are involved in humane law enforcement including private and public. One of the better known private agencies is the American Society for the Prevention of Cruelty to Animals, or ASPCA Police.

== Duties ==
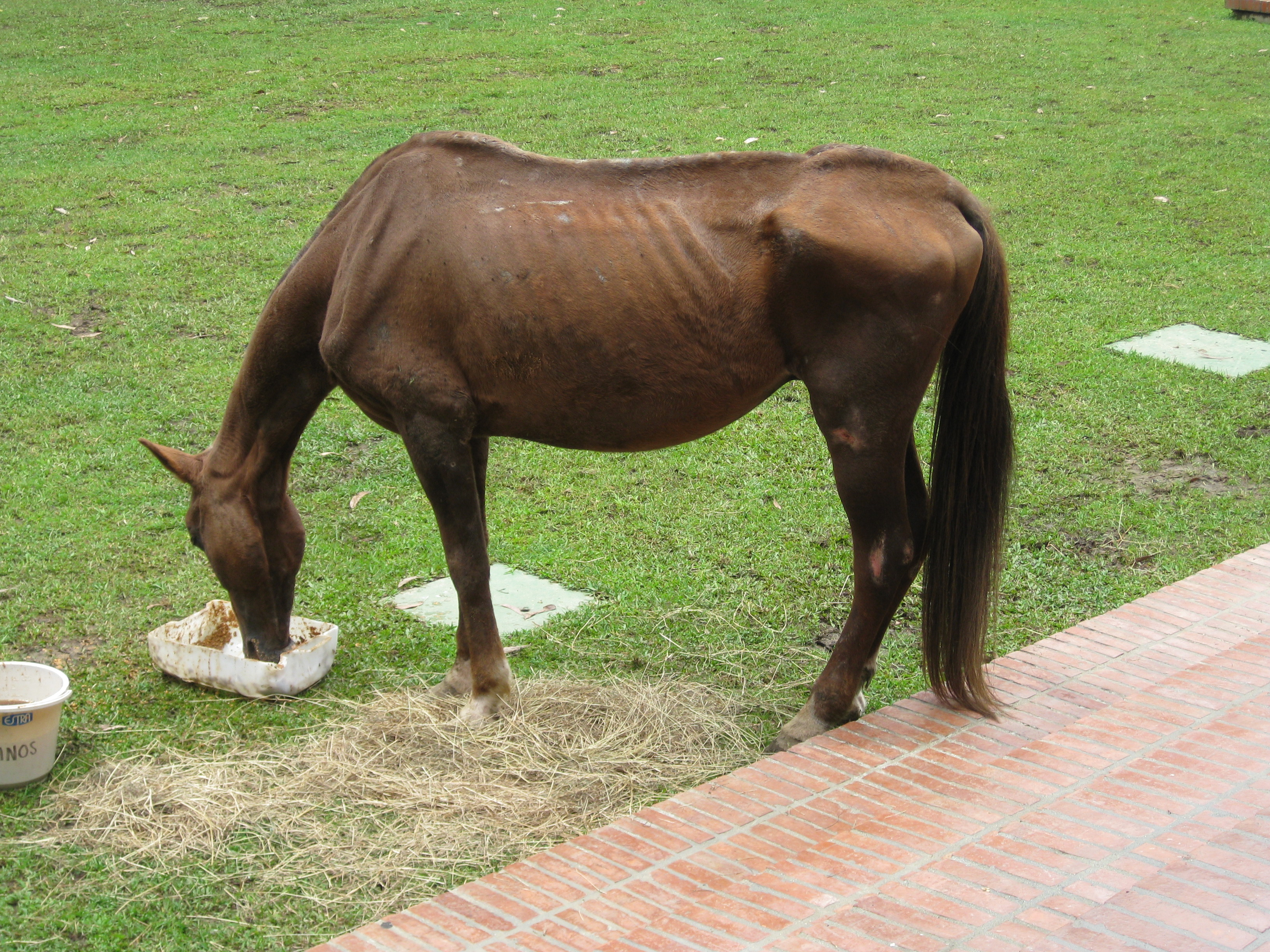
Visibly malnourished horse

The duties of humane law enforcement personnel also depend on the jurisdiction. Their duties may include performing routine patrol to look out for violations of humane laws, answering complaints relating to violations of humane laws, making arrests or issuing summonses for violations of humane laws, and seizing animals due to violations of humane laws. They may also perform undercover work.

Although some of the duties may differ slightly between different jurisdictions and agencies, for the most part many of the responsibilities will be the same. According to criminologycareers.com, humane law enforcement officers are responsible for "Investigating animal abuse cases, Enforcing laws related to the care and keeping of animals, Regulating industries that work with and use animals, Writing reports, Preparing and executing warrants, Arresting suspected criminals, Issuing civil fines, Responding to calls for service." These duties are performed by all humane enforcement agencies while others may differ slightly depending on the location of the agency. For example, a humane law officer in New York City would most likely not be dealing with bear baiting offenders like officers in South Carolina do.

== Education and training ==
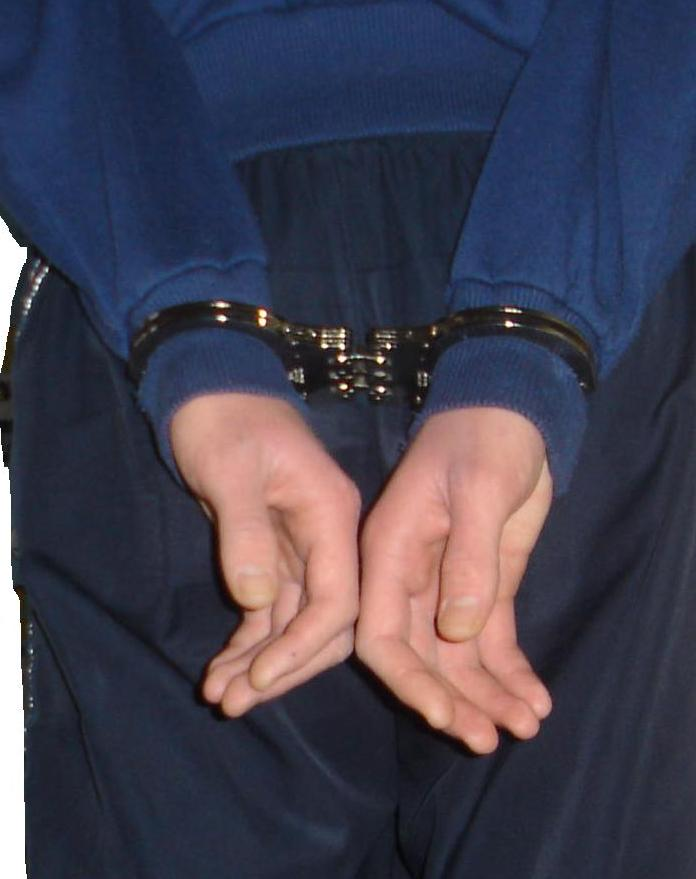
Hinged Handcuffs Rear Back To Back

Employment in humane law enforcement employment will at the very least require a high school diploma or GED. Many will require an advanced degree. A great majority of the agencies and departments will also require previous experience working with animals. Those hoping to become a humane officer through a police department will also have to go through the police academy. "Individuals interested in becoming humane society police officers may obtain training through state humane society associations, national animal control associations, community colleges or technical schools."

== See also ==
- New Jersey Society for the Prevention of Cruelty to Animals
