= National Advisory Commission on Criminal Justice Standards and Goals =

The National Advisory Commission on Criminal Justice and Standards was appointed by Richard Nixon's administration in 1971 to advise on how to improve state criminal justice agencies. The group of 22 members conducted multiple studies and published over 400 recommendations which influenced reform and were discussed in the news media including The New York Times.

== Background and mandate ==
Crime rates for the most common types of street crime such as murder, robbery, assaults, forcible rape, and burglary increased dramatically during the 1960s. The rising crime rates caught the attention of federal legislators. The United States Congress passed the Omnibus Crime Control and Safe Streets Act of 1968 ("Act") to address the problem. In the Act itself, Congress expressly noted that crime was essentially a state and local concern, but it found that the problem of increasing crime required federal aid to strengthen state and local criminal police, courts, and correction agencies. Title I of the Act created Law Enforcement Assistance Administration ("LEAA") in the United States Department of Justice to administer monies to states and localities through federal grants.

President Richard Nixon's Attorney General, John N. Mitchell, determined that state criminal justice agencies would benefit from advisory standards and goals based on actual experience in the various states. He directed LEAA to provide the financial support and the initiative for the effort. LEAA responded by creating and funding in 1973 the National Advisory Commission on Criminal Justice Standards and Goals made up of state and local political leaders and criminal justice professionals. The Commission's mandate was to create goals and standards for state and local governments to reduce crime and improve criminal justice.

== Commission members ==
The Administrator of the Law Enforcement Assistance Administration ("LEAA'), Jerris Leonard, appointed the Republican governor of Delaware, Russell W. Peterson to serve as Chairman of the Commission and Los Angeles County Sheriff, Peter J. Pitchess, to serve as Vice Chairman. The Executive Director of the Commission's staff was Thomas J. Madden, and its Deputy Director was Lawrence J. Leigh. Although LEAA selected the members of the Commission and its 12 specialized task forces, it did not direct the Commission's work or its product.

The 22 Commission members included law enforcement, judicial, community and political leaders from various levels of state and local government. Membership included police chiefs, judges, prosecutors, corrections leaders, and private attorneys. Among the members of the Commission who later had long political careers in the United States Senate were Arlen Spector, District Attorney of Philadelphia, and Richard G. Lugar, Mayor of Indianapolis.

== Work and reports ==
In 1973, the Commission finished its work and issued a summary volume, A National Strategy to Reduce Crime, which presented a broad picture of the Commission's work and summarized its approximately 400 standards and recommendations. For example, they included standards for criminal justice information systems, recruitment of minorities, community policing, speedy trial processing and treatment and rehabilitation of offenders. The Commission also recognized the importance of community organizations and programs outside the formal criminal system by issuing standards and recommendations for areas as diverse as community drug abuse treatment centers and the physical design of public places such as parks and buildings. The Commission presented the full text of each standard and recommendation with commentary in five separate volumes defined by subject matter entitled Criminal Justice System, Police, Courts, Corrections, and Community Crime Prevention.

== Commission and the news media ==
As noted in a commercially published edition of the Commission's work in 1975, certain specific standards and recommendations caught the attention of the news media such as a proposed ban on plea bargaining. One newsworthy recommendation was that each state should outlaw the private possession of handguns by 1983. As noted above, another recommendation was the abolition of plea bargaining: the negotiation of prosecutorial charging and sentencing recommendations in return for guilty pleas. Still another groundbreaking recommendation was that most offenders receive a maximum sentence of no more than five years except for career offenders. The Commission's call for privacy and security standards for criminal justice information systems such as criminal records and police intelligence files also received notice.

== Effect on structural reforms ==
The full impact of the Commission's approximately 400 standards and recommendations is beyond the scope of this article. However, there is evidence that the Commission's work did have an impact on professional development and structural reform of the police, courts, prosecutorial and public defender agencies in certain states. These included unification of correctional systems under statewide agencies and state-administered and financed judicial, prosecutorial and defender systems as well as the consolidation of smaller police departments into larger agencies. The Commission's report also inspired and spurred the adoption of a federal regulation governing criminal justice information systems. The Commission's proposal to ban plea bargaining was adopted in the state of Alaska, but not in major cities. Finally, the Commission's Report also contributed to and shaped judicial opinions towards constitutional and legislative standards in Supreme Court and lower court decisions.

== See also ==
- Florida Criminal Justice Standards & Training Commission

== General Reference ==
- National Advisory Committee on Criminal Justice Standards and Goals, Various Task Force Records, 1967-1972. M.E. Grenander Department of Special Collections and Archives, University Libraries, University at Albany, State University of New York (hereafter referred to as the Corrections Task Force Records).
