= St. Petersburg Police Department =

Police department of St. Petersburg, Florida, United States

Coordinates: 27.77222°N 82.65189°W

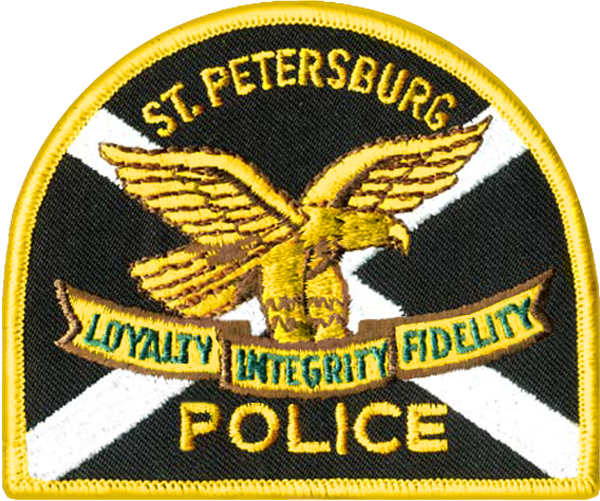
- Common name: St. Petersburg P.D.
- Abbreviation: SPPD

Agency overview
- Formed: 1903
- Employees: 757
- Volunteers: 62
- Annual budget: $86.9 million (2010 FY)

Jurisdictional structure
- Operations jurisdiction: Pinellas County, Florida, United States
- Map of St. Petersburg Police Department's Jurisdiction.
- Area: 64 sq mi (170 km^{2})
- Population: 262,000 citizens
- Legal jurisdiction: St. Petersburg, Florida, U.S.
- General nature: Local civilian police

Operational structure
- Headquarters: 1301 First Avenue North; St. Petersburg, Florida, U.S.
- Police Officers: 562
- Unsworn members: 212
- Agency executives: Anthony Holloway, Chief of Police; Joseph Dente, Assistant Chief, Uniform Services Bureau; Antonio Gilliam, Assistant Chief, Investigative Services Bureau; Michael Kovacsev, Assistant Chief, Administrative Services Bureau
- Bureaus: 4: Office of the Chief of Police; Administrative Services Bureau; Investigative Services Bureau; Uniform Services Bureau
- Divisions: 17: Community Awareness Division; Executive Operations Division; Legal Division; Internal Affairs; District 1; District 2; District 3; District 4; Uniform Support Division; Crimes Against Property Division; Crimes Against Persons Division; Youth Resources Division; Vice & Narcotics Division; Communications Division; Fiscal Services Division; Training Division; Records & Identification Division

Facilities
- Districts: 1
- Patrol Boats: 2

Website
- St.Petersburg Police Department

The St Petersburg Police Department (SPPD) provides crime prevention and public safety services for the city of St. Petersburg, Florida. The department was created in 1903. The St. Petersburg Police Department has an authorized strength of 550 sworn officers and 212 civilian support staff. The department serves the fifth largest city in the state of Florida, with a population of 250,000. The St. Petersburg Police Department is one of over 1,000 law enforcement agencies in the United States accredited by the Commission on Accreditation of Law Enforcement Agencies (CALEA). Anthony Holloway is the chief of police.

The department has specialized units, both uniformed and undercover, to target specific public safety issues within the city (i.e., auto thefts, violent crime). The department uses community outreach programs like Park Walk and Talk, Facebook, Twitter, and a tip 411 app to gather information from the community and address specific concerns.

== History ==
In 1960s African American police officers were discriminated against. They were not allowed to work in certain locations, move up in rank, and also were not permitted to arrest whites. They had separate water fountains and lockers in the police station and were referred to as "half-police officers" by the community. The officers even had to deal with their inability to arrest white people by having to wait for a white officer to come and make any actual arrests.

In 1965, a dozen officers, dubbed "the Courageous 12", sued the city for discrimination. These officers included Leon Jackson, Adam Baker, Freddie Crawford, Raymond DeLoach, Charles Holland, Robert Keys, Primus Killen, James King, Johnnie B. Lewis, Horace Nero, Jerry Styles, and Nathaniel Wooten. After losing their case, a federal appeals court, ruled in their favor in 1968, effectively ending the department's policy of segregation. James B. Sanderlin was an activist and a lawyer that fought to end social and legal inequality in St. Petersburg. He was the lawyer who represented the " Courageous 12", and later went on to become the first African American judge of Pinellas County.

Riots occurred in St. Petersburg, Florida in 1996 following the shooting and death of an African American male teenage motorist during a police traffic stop.

In 2011 three SPPD officers were killed within the span of less than one month.

In 2019 the Courageous 12 were honored by the creation of a plaque that was placed in the Saint Petersburg FL. Police department. In 2020 the only officer from the original Courageous 12 group still alive was Leon Jackson.

In January 2022, after the St. Petersburg Police Department fired an officer for using a stun gun on a 64-year-old man in a wheelchair, it sent a report to the Florida Criminal Justice Standards & Training Commission for it to decide whether the officer could keep his Florida certification.

== Districts ==
The St. Petersburg Police Department has divided the city into three districts:

- District One – Bethel Heights, Campbell Park, Bayfront Hospital, Roser Park, Lassing Park, Harbordale, Coquina Key, Albert Whitted Airport, Eckerd College, Lakewood Estates, Jordan Park, Maximo, Skyway Bridge
- District Two – Downtown, Tropicana Field, The Peir, Northshore Park, The Vinoy, Harris Park, Placido Bayou, Meadowlawn, Fossil Park, Snell Isle, Shore Acres, Old Northeast, St Anthony's Hospital
- District Three – Childs Park, Tyrone Square Mall, Azalea, United Central, Garden Manor, Holiday Park, St Pete General Hospital, Yacht Club Estates

== See also ==
- List of law enforcement agencies in Florida
- List of U.S. state and local law enforcement agencies
