= Florida Criminal Justice Standards & Training Commission =

American state agency

Agency overview
- Formed: 1967; 58 years ago
- Preceding agencies: Police Standards Commission; The Correctional Standards Council
- Type: Commission
- Jurisdiction: Florida law enforcement and correctional officers
- Headquarters: Florida, US
- Agency executives: Tommy Ford, Chairman; Michael L. Allen, Vice Chairman
- Parent department: Florida Department of Law Enforcement
- Website: Official website

The Florida Criminal Justice Standards & Training Commission (CJSTC), established in 1967 under Florida Statutes, Chapter 943, is a Florida state commission. The Commission's mission is "To ensure that all citizens of Florida are served by criminal justice officers who are ethical, qualified, and well-trained." It is part of the Florida Department of Law Enforcement.

== Responsibilities and powers ==
The Commission's mission is "To ensure that all citizens of Florida are served by criminal justice officers who are ethical, qualified, and well-trained." It has a number of primary responsibilities. One of them is to establish minimum standards for the hiring and training of law enforcement and correctional officers. A second responsibility is to certify officers. A third responsibility is to review and administer administrative sanctions where there is a violation of Florida Statutes and Commission standards. A fourth responsibility it to maintain records of all certified officers.

The Commission has the power to investigate and sanction officers for misconduct, as it can revoke an officer's certification, enforce compliance through injunctive relief and civil fines, and adopt rules for discipline. The Commission oversees an officer's discipline if an internal affairs investigation finds that a moral character violation took place, which includes among other infractions excessive use of force, any felony and certain misdemeanors involving dishonesty (regardless of criminal prosecution), participating in sexual conduct while on duty, making false statements during one's job application, and making false statements in a court proceeding. De-certification takes place when the Commission issues a Final Order in a case. If a matter goes to arbitration and an arbitrator finds that alleged misconduct never occurred, the Commission cannot proceed with decertification, but if the arbitrator finds that the misconduct did in fact occur—but considers termination to be too severe a penalty—the Commission can still decertify the person.

== History ==
=== Early years ===
The Commission was established in 1967 under Florida Statutes, Chapter 943, by the Florida Legislature. It is part of the Florida Department of Law Enforcement. In 1983, the Florida Correctional Standards Council of the Florida Department of Corrections was abolished, and its duty to certify corrections officers was assigned to the Police Standards Commission, the name of which was later changed to the Criminal Justice Standards & Training Commission.

In 2002, during which the Commission heard 344 cases, it decertified 46 law enforcement officers and 91 corrections officers, and that year 98 officers voluntarily relinquished their certifications. In 2011, Florida decertified 72 law enforcement officers. According to the Commission, from 1985 through mid-2018, the use of excessive force was cited as the reason for disciplining deputies, police officers, and jail and prison guards in Florida in 1,671 cases, the equivalent of about one such case per week.

In May 2019, the Commission de-certified a former Marco Island police officer who was found to have had sex while on duty, and to have possessed dangerous drugs.

In June 2015, a woman said Escambia County sheriff's deputy Michael Wohlers shot her with a stun gun, then apologized by sending a photo of a cake with blue frosting reading, "Sorry I Tased You". The Commission reviewed the case in August 2016 and banned Wohlers from serving with any law enforcement agency in Florida for one year.

=== 2020–present ===
In January 2022, after the St. Petersburg Police Department fired an officer for using a stun gun on a 64-year-old man in a wheelchair, it sent a report to the Commission to decide whether the officer could keep his Florida certification.

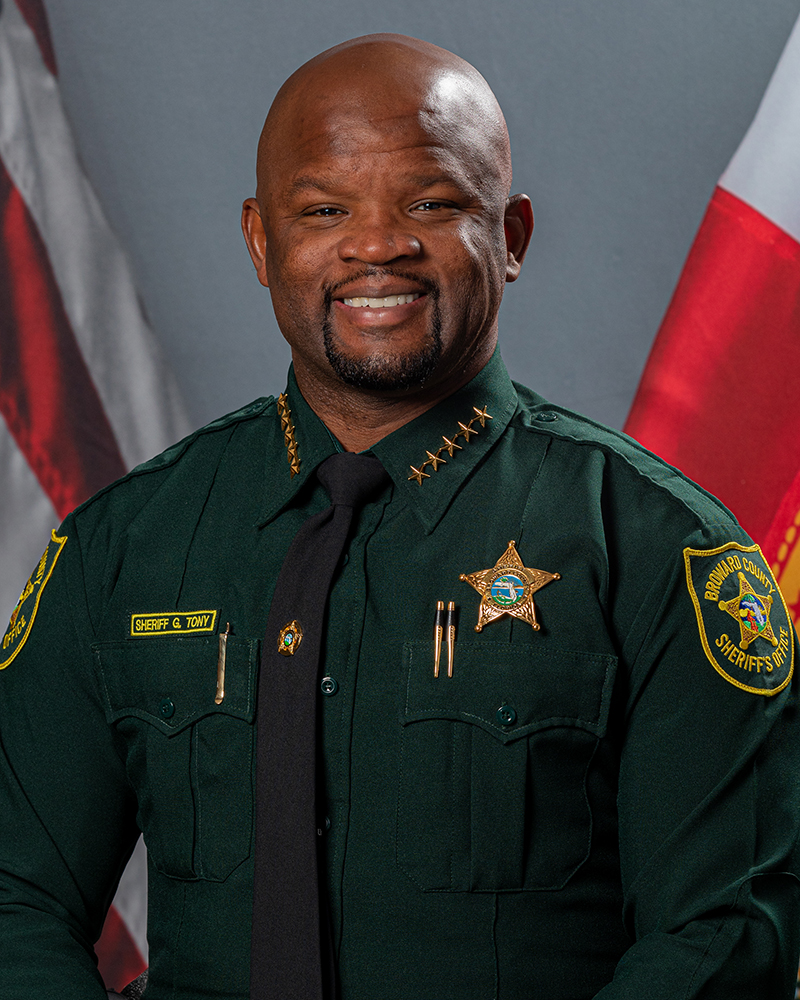
Gregory Tony

In June 2022, a three-member Commission panel recommended that a disciplinary process be initiated, and that Broward County Sheriff Gregory Tony be barred from being a law enforcement officer in Florida, because he had failed to disclose—when he applied to be a law enforcement officer—that he had shot and killed a man; it also brought charges of "Unlawful Acts in Relation to Driver License" against the sheriff. Tony then filed a request for an administrative hearing with the Commission, before an administrative law judge.

In August 2022, the Commission issued online a new searchable database that allows the public to check whether or not a Florida law enforcement officer has been the subject of any discipline relating to his or her certification. The database includes records of officers who have been disciplined by the Commission since January 1, 2012.

When in November 2022 a former Putnam County school resource deputy was accused of sneaking into a student's home to sexually batter her while her mother was at work or asleep, and asking her to dress up as a younger child and call him "daddy", starting when she was 15 years of age, it was announced that the Commission would review the case. The case was sent to the Commission by the Putnam County Sheriff, who was seeking to have the deputy's certification as a law enforcement officer permanently revoked.

== Members ==
The Commission has 19 members. They consist of three sheriffs, three chiefs of police, five law enforcement officers who are ranked sergeant or below, one person in charge of a county correctional institution, two correctional officers, one training center director, one Florida resident who does not fall into any of the preceding categories, the Florida Attorney General or proxy, the Secretary of the Florida Department of Corrections or proxy, and the Director of the Florida Highway Patrol.

== See also ==
- National Advisory Commission on Criminal Justice Standards and Goals, created to advise on how to improve state criminal justice agencies.
- Police officer certification and licensure in the United States
