= Outline of domestic violence =

Overview of and topical guide to domestic violence

The following outline is provided as an overview of and topical guide to domestic violence:

Domestic violence – pattern of abusive behaviors by one or both partners in an intimate relationship, such as marriage, dating, family, or cohabitation. It is also known as domestic abuse, spousal abuse, battering, family violence, and intimate partner violence (IPV).

== Description ==
Domestic violence can be described as all of the following:

- Violence – use of physical force to apply a state to others contrary to their wishes and may include some combination of verbal, emotional, economic, physical and sexual abuse.
- Coercive Control – Braiker identified the following ways that manipulators control their victims:
  - Positive reinforcement: praise, superficial charm, superficial sympathy (crocodile tears), excessive apologizing; money, approval, gifts; attention, facial expressions such as a forced laugh or smile; public recognition.
  - Negative reinforcement: removing one from a negative situation as a reward. For example: "You won't have to walk home if you allow me to do this to you."
  - Intermittent or partial reinforcement: partial or intermittent negative reinforcement can create an effective climate of fear and doubt. Partial or intermittent positive reinforcement can encourage the victim to persist.
  - Punishment: berating, yelling, refusing to speak to partner, intimidation, threats, swearing, emotional blackmail, the guilt trap, sulking, crying, and playing the victim.
  - Traumatic one-trial learning: verbal abuse, explosive anger, or other intimidating behavior to establish dominance or superiority; even one incident of such behavior can condition or train victims to avoid upsetting, confronting or contradicting the manipulator.
- Oppression – exercise of authority or power in a burdensome, cruel, or unjust manner. It can also be defined as an act or instance of oppressing, the state of being oppressed, and the feeling of being heavily burdened, mentally or physically, by troubles, adverse conditions, and anxiety. Abusers usually humiliate and brainwash the victim verbally, in which the victims may find themselves devalued with emotional distress. The intention is to exploit and dominate in depriving the victim of their most basic rights and needs.
- Extreme criticism constantly - This is one of the most serious emotional abuse issues. Abusers will use many brainwashing techniques to make the victims question themselves upon their guilt – this may lead to the victims suffering from Post-traumatic stress disorder. Abusers often like to criticise the victims either directly or indirectly. The intention of such an act is to make the victim lose their confidence and doubt their abilities so that they look to their abuser to give them the validation they need. Abusers may also leave the victims isolated from their family and friends and many of them resulted in mental distress like feeling ashamed, terrified and hurt.

== Prevalence ==
Epidemiology of domestic violence – Domestic violence occurs across the world, in various cultures, and affects people across society, irrespective of economic status or gender.

== Forms ==
The following table includes the forms of violence typically defined as part of Intimate partner violence, which is domestic violence in an intimate relationship by one's spouse or lover. It also includes a column for other family members or partners.

The rate of occurrence varies considerably based upon one's country, socio-economic class, culture, religion, family history and other factors.

Form of Violence	Intimate Partners / Domestic Violence	Other family members or partners
Acid throwing – violent assault by throwing acid onto the body of a person "with the intention of injuring or disfiguring out of jealousy or revenge."	check	check
Birth control sabotage – efforts to manipulate another person's use of birth control or to undermine efforts to prevent an unwanted pregnancy. Examples include replacing birth control pills with fakes, puncturing condoms and diaphragms, or threats and violence to prevent an individual's attempted use of birth control.	check	
Breast ironing – pounding and massaging of a pubescent girl's breasts using heated objects in an attempt to make them stop developing or disappear.		check
Bride burning – form of domestic violence for unresolved dowry issues resulting in death.	check	
Bride-buying – illegal industry or trade of "purchasing a bride" to become property that can be resold or repurchased for reselling.	check	
Dating abuse – pattern of abusive behavior exhibited by one or both partners in a dating relationship.	check	check
Domestic violence and pregnancy – abusive behavior towards a pregnant woman that whether physical, verbal or emotional, produces many adverse physical and psychological effects for the mother and fetus.	check	
Dowry death – deaths of young women who are murdered or driven to suicide by continuous harassment and torture by husbands and in-laws in an effort to extort an increased dowry.	check	
Economic abuse – form of abuse when one intimate partner has control over the other partner's access to economic resources, which diminishes the victim's earning capacity and forces financial reliance on the perpetrator.	check	check
Elder abuse – "a single, or repeated act, or lack of appropriate action, occurring within any relationship where there is an expectation of trust which causes harm or distress to an older person."	check	check
Female genital mutilation – the mutilation of the exterior vulvar structures of girls and women.		
Foot binding – binding the feet of young girls painfully tight to prevent further growth.		check
Honor killing – homicide of a member of a family or social group by other members, due to the belief of the perpetrators that the victim has brought dishonor upon the family or community. Honor killings are directed mostly against women and girls, but have been extended to men. Also spelled "honour killing" (American and British spelling differences).	check	check
Marital rape – non-consensual sex in which the perpetrator is the victim's spouse, and as such, is a form of domestic violence, and sexual abuse. Although repudiated by international conventions and increasingly criminalized, in many countries, spousal rape either remains legal, or is illegal but widely tolerated and accepted as a husband's prerogative. Also known as "spousal rape".	check	
Murder of pregnant women – type of homicide often resulting from domestic violence by a spouse or intimate partner violence (IPV).	check	
Parental abuse by children – parents subject to levels of childhood aggression in excess of normal childhood aggressive outbursts, typically in the form of verbal or physical abuse.		check
Parental abuse of children – physical or psychological/emotional mistreatment of children. It is often distinguished from domestic violence as its own form of violence.		check
Psychological abuse – form of abuse characterized by a person subjecting or exposing another to behavior that may result in psychological trauma, including anxiety, chronic depression, or post-traumatic stress disorder. Such abuse is often associated with situations of power imbalance, such as abusive relationships, bullying, child abuse and workplace bullying. Psychological abuse is also referred to as "emotional abuse" or "mental abuse".	check	check
Physical abuse – abuse involving contact intended to cause feelings of intimidation, injury, or other physical suffering or bodily harm.	check	check
Sati – religious funeral practice among some Indian communities in which a recently widowed woman either voluntarily or by use of force and coercion would have immolated herself on her husband's funeral pyre.	check	
Sexual violence – any sexual act, attempt to obtain a sexual act, unwanted sexual comments or advances, or acts to traffic, or otherwise directed, against a person's sexuality using coercion, by any person regardless of their relationship to the victim, in any setting, including but not limited to home and work.	check	check
Spiritual abuse – serious form of abuse which occurs when a person in religious authority or a person with a unique spiritual practice misleads and maltreats another person in the name of God or church or in the mystery of any spiritual concept.	check	check
Stalking – unwanted and obsessive attention by an individual or group to another person. Stalking behaviors are related to harassment and intimidation and may include following the victim in person and/or monitoring them via the internet.	check	check
Teen dating violence – physical, sexual, or psychological / emotional violence within a dating relationship.		check
Verbal abuse – often used to control the victim and can lead to significant detriment to one's self-esteem, emotional well-being, and physical state.	check	check

== Victims ==
Domestic violence affects people across society, irrespective of age, gender, sexual orientation, culture, religion or socio-economic status. Stop Abuse For Everyone (SAFE), a United States domestic violence organization, advocates for an "inclusive" model of domestic violence, focusing on groups that are "lacking in services", such as abused men, gay, lesbian, intersex, and transgender victims, and the elderly.

=== Women ===
Some forms of domestic violence are unique to women victims:

- Bride-buying
- Domestic violence and pregnancy
- Domestic violence in lesbian relationships
- Misogyny, the hate and contempt of women and girls

=== Men ===
Male victims of domestic abuse:

- Domestic violence against men
- Misandry, the hate and contempt of men and boys

A large study, compiled by Martin S. Fiebert, shows that women are as likely to be abusive to men, but the men are less likely to be hurt. However, he noted, men are seriously injured in 38% of the cases in which "extreme aggression" is used. Fiebert additionally noted that his work was not meant to minimize the serious effects of men who abuse women. (Note: Martin S. Fiebert of the Department of Psychology at California State University, Long Beach, has compiled an annotated bibliography of research relating to spousal abuse by women on men. This bibliography examines 275 scholarly investigations: 214 empirical studies and 61 reviews and/or analyses appear to demonstrate that women are as physically aggressive, or more aggressive, than men in their relationships with their spouses or male partners. The aggregate sample size in the reviewed studies exceeds 365,000. In a Los Angeles Times article about male victims of domestic violence, Fiebert suggests that "...consensus in the field is that women are as likely as men to strike their partner but that—as expected—women are more likely to be injured than men.") Women are far more likely to use weapons, such as throwing a plate or firing a gun. The National Institute of Justice (NIJ) contends that a national survey, supported by NIJ, the Centers for Disease Control and Prevention, and the Bureau of Justice Statistics that examined more serious assaults, does not support the conclusion of similar rates of male and female spousal assaults. This survey was conducted within a safety or crime context and found more partner abuse by men against women. (Note: The National Institute of Justice states that studies finding equal or greater frequency of abuse by women against men are based on data compiled through the Conflict Tactics Scale. This survey tool was developed in the 1970s and may not be appropriate for intimate partner violence research because it does not measure control, coercion, or the motives for conflict tactics; it also leaves out sexual assault and violence by ex-spouses or partners and does not determine who initiated the violence.) A study published in the Violence & Victims Journal Vol. 1 concluded that a feminist analysis of Domestic Abuse was necessary to combat common misconceptions. The study found that 92% of women who used violence against their male partners were in self-defense, and that violence reciprocated by victims may be an integral part of abuse victimology.

=== LGBT ===
Abuse in same-sex relationships is under-researched area of domestic violence, with a very wide range of prevalence estimates, and with fewer resources available for shelter and counseling.

- Domestic violence in same-sex relationships
- Domestic violence in lesbian relationships

=== Children ===
Within a family, children may be victims of domestic child abuse in various ways:

- Parental bullying of children, where a parent is overly aggressive towards his or her child
- Narcissistic parent, where the child is considered to exist to fulfill the parent's wishes and needs
- Sibling abuse, where one sibling is abusive towards another sibling

A child may be affected by domestic violence even when the child is not the direct target:

- Effects of domestic violence on children

=== Parents and the elderly ===
Domestic violence can also be perpetrated by children against their parents:

- Parental abuse by children, also known as child-to-parent violence
- Elder abuse, domestic violence against older people

== Research concepts ==
=== Measurement instruments ===
- Conflict tactics scale – research method for identifying intimate partner violence by measuring the conflict tactic behaviors.

=== Theoretical constructs ===
- Cycle of abuse – social cycle theory to explain patterns of behavior of a violent intimate relationship: Tension building phase, acting-out phase, reconciliation / honeymoon phase, and calm phase, which leads back to the tension building phase.
- Cycle of violence
  - Within a relationship – repeated acts of violence as a cyclical pattern, associated with high emotions and doctrines of retribution or revenge. The pattern, or cycle, repeats and can happen many times during a relationship. Each phase may last a different length of time and over time the level of violence may increase.
  - Intergenerational cycle of violence – violence that is passed from father to son or daughter, parent to child, or sibling to sibling.
- Misandry – the hatred or dislike of men or boys, which manifests like Misogyny.
- Misogyny – the hatred or dislike of women or girls, may be manifested in varying degrees of intensity, like teaching girls or women to feel self-contempt or violence.
- Relational disorder – dysfunction within a relationship, versus being specific to a specific individual's dysfunction.

=== Partner dynamics ===
- Situational couple violence – arises infrequently out of conflicts that escalate to arguments and then to violence, rather than a general pattern of control. It is likely the most common type of intimate partner violence. Women are "almost as likely" as men to be abusers, however, women are more likely to be physically injured, require police intervention and become fearful of their mates.
- Intimate terrorism (IT) – pattern of ongoing control using emotional, physical and other forms of domestic violence. It is what was traditionally the definition of domestic violence depicted in the "Power and Control Wheel" which illustrates the different and inter-related forms of abuse.
- Violent resistance (VR), or "self-defense" – violence perpetrated by victims against their abusive partners. It is generally used infrequently because, men are often better able to physically overpower women.
- Common couple violence (CCV) – domestic violence "in which conflict occasionally gets ‘out of hand,’ leading usually to ‘minor’ forms of violence, and rarely escalates into serious or life-threatening forms of violence."
- Mutual violent control (MVC) – rare type of intimate partner violence that occurs when both partners act in a violent manner, battling for control.

== Impacts ==
The incidence of abuse may result in the following:

- Effects of domestic violence on children – dysfunctions in the physical, behavioral, emotional, and social areas of life which affect their well-being, child development, teen dating experiences, future domestic situations and mortality.
- Mental illness – psychological or behavioral pattern generally associated with subjective distress or disability that occurs in an individual, and which is not a part of normal development or culture. Such a disorder may consist of a combination of affective, behavioral, cognitive and perceptual components.
  - Battered person syndrome – physical and psychological condition victims of domestic abuse, which may be manifested as a type of Post-traumatic stress disorder (PTSD), from an ongoing Cycle of abuse.
  - Self-harm – intentional, direct injuring of body tissue most often done without suicidal intentions.
- Suicide, – act of intentionally causing one's own death. Suicide is often committed out of despair or attributed to some underlying mental disorder, such as depression, bipolar disorder, schizophrenia, alcoholism, or drug abuse.
  - Self-immolation – setting oneself on fire, often as a form of protest or for the purposes of martyrdom or suicide.

== Legal ==
- Domestic violence court – specialized courts designed to improve victim safety and enhance defendant accountability, created in response to frustration among victim advocates, judges and attorneys who saw the same litigants cycling through the justice system repeatedly.
- Evidence-based prosecution of domestic violence – prosecutors aggressively trying domestic violence cases, basing their cases on evidence rather than victim cooperation, resulting in higher conviction rates.
- Injunction – equitable remedy in the form of a court order that requires a party to do or refrain from doing certain acts. A party that fails to comply with an injunction faces criminal or civil penalties and may have to pay damages or accept sanctions. In some cases, breaches of injunctions are considered serious criminal offenses that merit arrest and possible prison sentences.
- Restraining order – requires a party to do, or to refrain from doing, certain acts. A party that refuses to comply with an order faces criminal or civil penalties and may have to pay damages or accept sanctions. Breaches of restraining orders can be considered serious criminal offences that merit arrest and possible prison sentences. The term is most commonly used in reference to domestic violence, harassment, stalking or sexual assault.
- Battered woman defense – a self-defense measure used in court that the person accused of an assault / murder was suffering from battered person syndrome.

== Religion and domestic violence ==
- Religion and domestic violence
- Christianity and domestic violence
- Islam and domestic violence
  - Peaceful Families Project – Muslim organization

== Domestic violence by region ==
- Domestic violence in Afghanistan
  - Family Response Unit – office of the Afghan National Police which deals with domestic violence, female and child victims of crime, and female suspects. The unit is staffed by policewomen trained by the United Nations Assistance Mission in Afghanistan (UNAMA).
- Domestic violence in Argentina
  - Domestic violence against women in Argentina
- Domestic violence in Armenia
- Domestic violence in Australia
  - Humbug (Aboriginal) – forms of begging and domestic violence in rural and remote Aboriginal communities in the Northern Territory, Australia.
- Domestic violence in Bolivia
- Domestic violence in Brazil
  - Human rights in Brazil and domestic violence
  - Lei Maria da Penha – Brazil's federal law against domestic violence
- Domestic violence in Chile
- Domestic violence in Colombia
  - Lissette Ochoa domestic violence case – one of the best known cases of spousal abuse in Colombia because of the couple's elite social status and for the brutality of the battering perpetrated on Lissette Ochoa by her husband Rafael Dangond.
- Domestic violence in Ecuador
- Domestic violence in Guyana
- Domestic violence in India
  - Bell Bajao – campaign of the Breakthrough (human rights) organization
  - Protection of Women from Domestic Violence Act 2005 – India federal law
  - Save Indian Family (India) – men's rights movement that asserts misuse of India's laws related to dowry harassment and domestic violence and provides moral and legal support for men and their families who have suffered or have been accused of intimate partner violence.
- Domestic violence in Iran
- Domestic violence in Malaysia
  - Women's Aid Organisation – non-governmental organization that fights for women's rights and specifically against violence against women.
- Domestic violence in Norway
- Domestic violence in Panama
- Domestic violence in Paraguay
- Domestic violence in Peru
- Domestic violence in Russia
- Domestic violence in Samoa
- Domestic violence in South Korea
  - Korea Women's Hot Line – non-profit women's rights activist group, protecting women's rights from all kinds of violence and advancing women's social position as well as establishing gender equality in the spheres of family, work, and society.
- Domestic violence in Spain
  - Shows red card to abuser – a public awareness campaign and symbol to say "no" to domestic violence
- Domestic violence in Tajikistan
- Domestic violence in Turkey
- Domestic violence in the United Kingdom
  - Organizations
    - Broken Rainbow (organisation) – deals with same sex domestic violence
    - Campaign Against Domestic Violence – organization with multi-pronged approach towards eliminating domestic violence
    - ManKind Initiative – domestic violence charity
    - Refuge (United Kingdom charity) – charity for female victims
    - Scottish Women's Aid – charity to prevent domestic violence against women and children
    - Women's Aid Federation of England – United Kingdom charity to prevent domestic violence against women and children
      - What's it going to take? – campaign of the WAFOE
  - Laws \ legal issues
    - Domestic Violence, Crime and Victims Act 2004 –
- Domestic violence in the United States
  - Laws \ legal issues
    - Address confidentiality program – some states in the United States
    - Domestic Violence Offender Gun Ban – addresses Gun violence in the United States
    - Violence Against Women Act – United States federal law
    - Family Violence Prevention and Services Act –
  - Organizations
    - Futures Without Violence –
    - Loveisrespect, National Teen Dating Abuse Helpline –
    - National Coalition Against Domestic Violence –
    - National Domestic Violence Hotline –
    - National Network to End Domestic Violence –
    - Tahirih Justice Center –

== Prevention ==
- Duluth model (United States) –
- Initiatives to prevent sexual violence (United States) –
- CVFR batterer intervention program (United States) – based on NVC and reported 0% recidivism
- Restorative Justice

== Experts ==
=== Academics ===
Some of the major academic researchers on domestic violence are:

- Jacquelyn Campbell, domestic homicides, female victims
- Kenneth Dodge, aggressive behavior, violence in children
- Emily Douglas, child abuse and welfare, help seeking, public policy
- Mary Ellsberg, international studies, violence against women
- David Finkelhor, child sexual abuse
- Nicola Graham-Kevan, aggression, perpetrator treatment
- Denise Hines. prevention, dating violence, child abuse, male victims
- Linda Saltzman, epidemiology, surveillance, prevalence
- Murray Straus, prevalence, corporal punishment

=== Activists ===
Some of the most notable domestic violence activists are:

- Ruahine Albert, New Zealand, co-founded women's shelter, perpetrator treatment
- Angela Barker, Australia, dating violence victim, advocate
- Sarah Buel, USA, lawyer, victim advocate
- Elizabeth Celi, Australia, psychologist, male victims
- Anne Cools, Canada, senator, ran one of the first domestic violence shelters in Canada
- Donna Ferrato, USA, photojournalist documenting domestic violence
- Ellen Pence, USA, co-founded the Duluth Domestic Abuse Intervention Project
- Erin Pizzey, England, founded the world's first domestic violence shelter
- Deborah Tucker, USA, founded the first domestic violence shelter in the United States

== International organizations and conventions ==
- United Nations
  - United Nations Development Fund for Women
  - United Nations Entity for Gender Equality and the Empowerment of Women (UN Women)
- United Nations General Assembly
  - Declaration on the Elimination of Violence Against Women (DEVAW)
  - Convention on the Elimination of All Forms of Discrimination Against Women (CEDAW)
- African Union
  - Protocol to the African Charter on Human and Peoples’ Rights on the Rights of Women in Africa (Maputo Protocol)
- Council of Europe
  - Convention on preventing and combating violence against women and domestic violence (Istanbul Convention)
- Organization of American States
  - Inter-American Convention on the Prevention, Punishment, and Eradication of Violence against Women (Belém do Pará Convention)
- Islam-related organizations
  - AHA Foundation – concerned with Muslim women's rights in Western countries
  - Peaceful Families Project – (Islamic organization)

== Domestic violence-related media ==
=== Periodicals ===
- Contemporary Family Therapy – journal with articles about "the latest developments in theory, research and practice pertaining to family therapy, with an emphasis on examining families within their broader socio-economic and ethnic matrices."
- Family Process – non-profit journal with current articles about family system issues, focusing on research, policy, and applied practice.
- Family Relations – international journal, published on behalf of the National Council on Family Relations, regarding family studies.
- International Journal of Interdisciplinary Social Sciences
- Journal of Adult Protection
- Journal of Child and Family Studies
- Journal of Family Issues – peer-reviewed academic journal that publishes papers in the field of Family Studies.
- Journal of Family Psychology
- Journal of Family Violence
- Journal of Interdisciplinary Social Sciences
- Journal of Interpersonal Violence – publishes current "information on domestic violence, rape, child sexual abuse and other violent crimes."
- Journal of Marital and Family Therapy
- Journal of Marriage and the Family
- Signs: Journal of Women in Culture and Society – academic journal covering a wide range of disciplines covering issues like gender, race, culture, class, sexuality, and/or nation.
- Trauma, Violence, & Abuse – publishes original research for practitioners.
- Violence Against Women – peer-reviewed academic journal that publishes papers in the field of Women's studies.

=== Books, non-fictional ===
- Mommie Dearest (1978), a memoir described the author's upbringing by an abusive alcoholic mother.
- Life with Billy (1986), describing a woman's life with her abusive husband.
- The War on Women (2007), about domestic violence in Canada.
- I'm Glad My Mom Died (2022), another memoir about growing up with an abusive mother.

=== Books, fictional ===
- Oliver Twist

=== Documentaries ===
- A Better Man (2017)
- The Conspiracy of Silence
- Defending Our Lives
- Power and Control: Domestic Violence in America
- Silent Voices
- Sin by Silence

=== Films ===
- American Tragedy
- Black and Blue
- Blinded
- Bordertown
- The Burning Bed
- Daughters
- Enough
- Fried Green Tomatoes
- The Godfather
- If Someone Had Known
- Looking for Angelina
- Men Don't Tell
- No One Would Tell
- Once Were Warriors
- All film adaptations of Oliver Twist, including Oliver!
- One Minute to Nine
- The Prince of Tides
- Provoked
- Sleeping with the Enemy
- Submission
- Unforgivable
- What's Love Got to Do with It

== Gallery ==
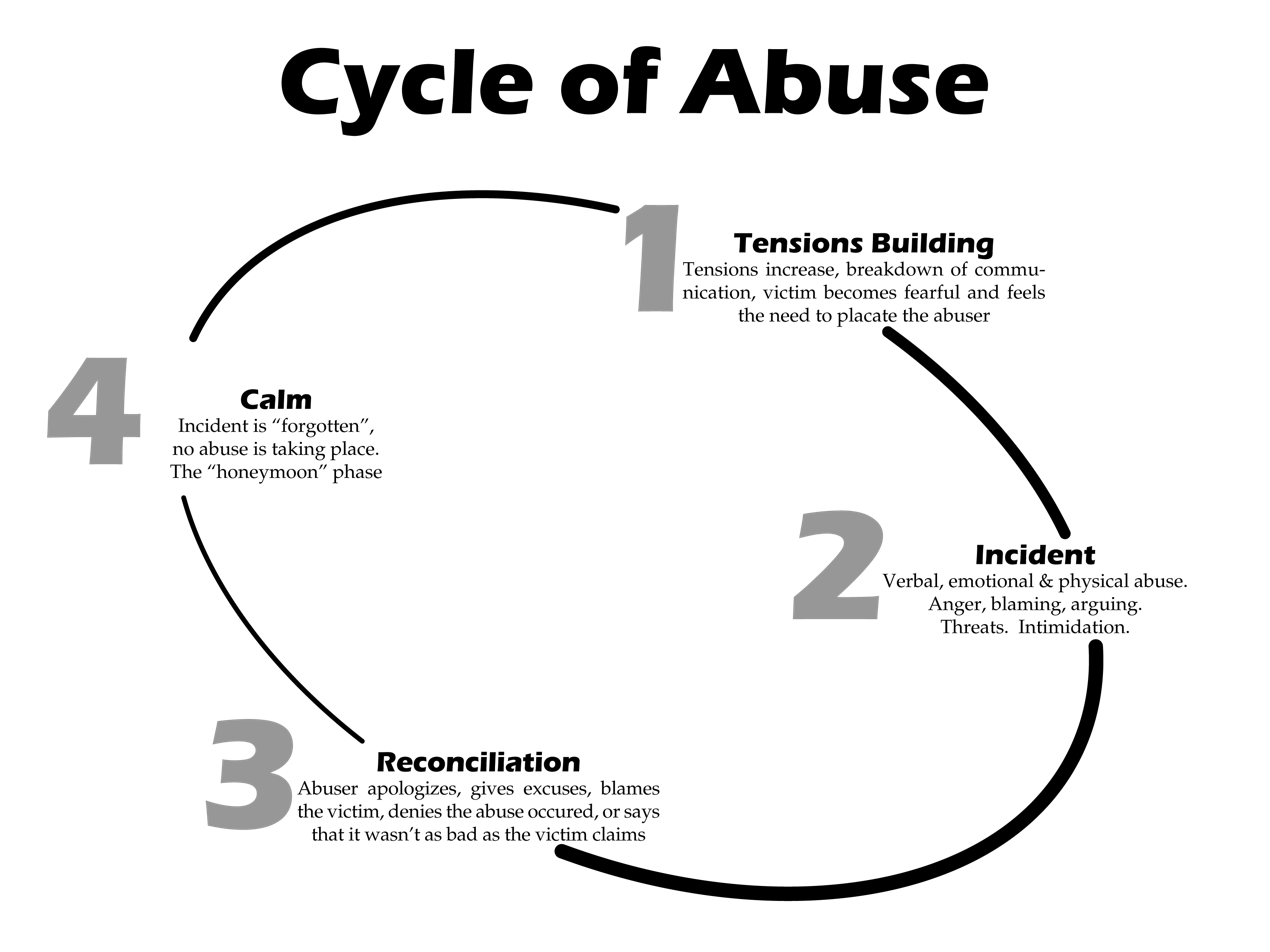
The four phases of the Cycle of Abuse in some ongoing domestic violence situations

== See also ==
- Abuse
- Dating violence
- Domestic violence (women's) shelter
- Gender studies
- Impact of the 2019–20 coronavirus pandemic on domestic violence
- Interpersonal relationships
- Men's rights
- Sociology of the family
- Victimization
- Violence
