= NVR =

NVR may refer to:

== Transport ==
- Naval Vessel Register, the United States Navy ship inventory
- Nene Valley Railway, a heritage railway in England
- Yurievo Airport, Velikiy Novgorod, Russia, by airport code
- Northern Vermont Railroad, a former class III railroad that operated in Vermont from 1996 to 2002.
- Napa Valley Railroad, a class III railroad that operates in The Napa Valley, in California. The common carrier for Napa Valley Wine Train

== Other uses ==
- Network video recorder, a digital video recorder that records data to a network storage device, such as a NAS device, file server or FTP server
- No Voltage Release, a type of switch
- NVR, Inc., an American homebuilder based in Virginia
- North Vietnamese Regular, a soldier in the Vietnam People's Army
- Non Violent Resistance (psychological intervention), an approach for overcoming problematic behaviour
