= Emily Douglas =

Emily Douglas may refer to:

- Emily Taft Douglas, (1899–1994) Democratic politician from Illinois and author
- Emily M. Douglas, academic and domestic violence expert
- Emily Elizabeth Douglas, (born 1982), founder and executive director of Grandma's Gifts
