= Cycle of violence =

Violent behavior learned as a child, and then repeated as an adult

The term cycle of violence refers to repeated and dangerous acts of violence as a cyclical pattern, associated with high emotions and doctrines of retribution or revenge. The pattern, or cycle, repeats and can happen many times during a relationship. Each phase may last a different length of time, and over time the level of violence may increase. The phrase has been increasingly widespread since first popularized in the 1970s.

It often refers to violent behaviour learned as a child, and then repeated as an adult, therefore continuing on in a perceived cycle.

== Within a relationship ==
A cycle of abuse generally follows the following pattern:

- Abuse – The abuser initiates aggressive, verbal or physical abuse, designed to control and oppress the victim.
- Guilt – The abuser feels guilty for inflicting abusive behavior, primarily out of a concern of being found guilty of abuse rather than feelings of sympathy for the victim.
- Excuses – Rationalization of the behavior, including blame and excuses.
- "Normal" behavior – The abuser regains personal control, creates a peaceful phase in an attempt to make the victim feel comfortable in the relationship.
- Fantasy and planning – thinking of what the victim has done wrong, how they will be punished, and developing a plan to realize the fantasy.
- Set-up – the plan is "put in motion."

A cyclical nature of domestic violence is most prevalent in intimate terrorism (IT), which involve a pattern of ongoing control using emotional, physical and other forms of domestic violence and is what generally leads victims, who are most often women, to women's shelters. It is what was traditionally the definition of domestic violence and is generally illustrated with the "Power and Control Wheel" to illustrate the different and inter-related forms of abuse. Intimate terrorism is different from situational couple violence, which are isolated incidents of varying degrees of intensity.

A general, intricate and complicated cycle of traumatic violence and healing map was developed by Olga Botcharova when she worked at the Center for International Studies.

== Intergenerational ==
Intergenerational cycles of violence occur when violence is passed from parent to child, or sibling to sibling.

Children exposed to domestic violence are likely to develop behavioral problems, such as regressing, exhibiting out of control behavior, and imitating behaviors. Children may think that violence is an acceptable behavior of intimate relationships and become either the abused or the abuser. Recent research has questioned whether certain effects of domestic violence exposure on children are moderated and/or mediated by maternal psychological response such as maternal post-traumatic stress disorder, dissociation, and related biological markers.

An estimated 1/5 to 1/3 of teenagers subject to viewing domestic violence situations experience teen dating violence, regularly abusing or being abused by their partners verbally, mentally, emotionally, sexually and/or physically. Thirty to fifty percent of dating relationships can exhibit the same cycle of escalating violence in their marital relationships.

Physical punishment of children has also been linked to later domestic violence. Family violence researcher Murray A. Straus believes that disciplinary spanking forms "the most prevalent and important form of violence in American families", whose effects contribute to several major societal problems, including later assaults on spouses.

== In politics ==
In 1377, Arab philosopher Ibn Khaldun identified a cycle of violence in which successive dynasties take control of a state and establish asabiyyah or social cohesion, enabling them to expand to the limit. Excess 'pomp' causes the dynasty then to stagnate, become sedentary and collapse, giving way to conquest by a new, more ruthless dynasty. This cycle plays out over the course of three generations.

According to John Mearsheimer, the cycle of violence between nations will continue indefinitely because the great powers fear each other, thus compete for power and dominance, in the belief that this will ensure safety.

'Cycle of violence' is also used more generally to describe any long-term factional dispute within a nation in which tit for tat acts of aggression occur frequently, as for example in Argentina in the 1970s, and Lebanon.

== See also ==
- Abuse
- Behavioral contagion
- Buffalo buffalo buffalo buffalo buffalo buffalo buffalo
- Child abuse
- Cumulative extremism
- Domestic violence
- Effects of domestic violence on children
- Feud
- Hatfield–McCoy feud
- Intergenerationality
- Outline of domestic violence
- State collapse
- Violence begets violence
