= SIEC =

SIEC may refer to:

- Symbiosis International Education Centre, now Symbiosis International University
- SIEC (The Integrated National System for Criminal Statistics), see Domestic violence in Panama
- Sydney International Equestrian Centre, known as SIEC
- Sexuality Information and Education Council of the United States, known as SIECUS
