= Women in Guyana =

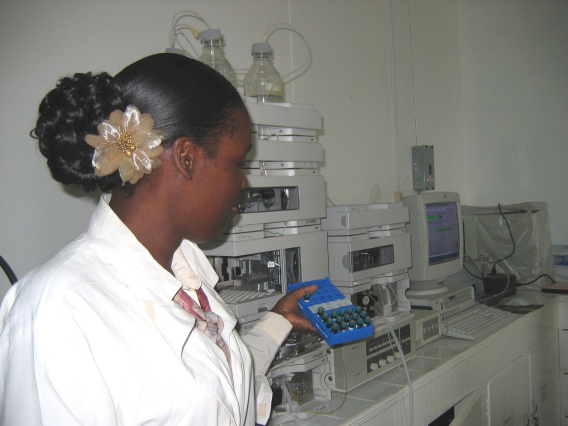
- A technician at the Guyana Food and Drug Department Laboratory in Georgetown, selecting samples for testing with new equipment

General statistics
- Maternal mortality (per 100,000): 229 (2018)
- Women in parliament: 35.7% (2020)
- Women over 25 with secondary education: 61.5% (2012)
- Women in labour force: 42.3% (2012)

Gender Inequality Index (2019)
- Value: 0.454 (2021)
- Rank: 114th out of 191 out of 169

Global Gender Gap Index
- Value: 0.752 (2022)
- Rank: 35th out of 146

Women in Guyana are a cross-section of Asian, African, and indigenous backgrounds. British colonization and imperialism have contributed to the sexism against Guyanese women in the household, politics, and education.

== Overview ==
Guyana is geographically located in South America, but Guyana is culturally and historically aligned with the Commonwealth Caribbean and is often compared to Trinidad and Tobago.

=== Demographics ===
A country with primarily Indo-Guyanese, Afro-Guyanese, and Amerindian women, Guyana has also been home to women of European (mainly Portuguese) and Chinese descent. Indian emigration to the West-Indies is mostly concentrated in Guyana (43.5%).

=== Roles in Society ===
Many urban Guyanese women are breadwinners and heads of the households, particularly in working-class families. In 1966, after Guyana's independence, women had to acquire stable jobs to accumulate a portion of the household income. As a result of the instability of Guyana's economy post-independence, it led to an increase in marriage and generational conflict.

Obeah women are folk-religious leaders.

The country has had a female president, Janet Jagan.

== Research ==
=== Stereotypes and Household Dynamics ===
Racialized differences between Indo-Guyanese and Afro-Guyanese people have often defined female roles in the country's society.

==== Indo-Guyanese Women ====
Early records about South Asian women (a large percentage from India) brought to Guyana for indentured, agricultural labor to bolster the British Empire's economy defined a "barbaric other" which sometimes blurred the identities of the empire's non-European subjects. Official colonial-era documents often led to the portrayal of "libidinous, immoral women" or female victims.

==== Afro-Guyanese Women ====
Early studies of gender in the Caribbean defined households in terms of the "Euro-American nuclear family", and the assumption of female domesticity disregarded women's roles outside the family. Afro-Caribbean households headed by women were framed as "deviant, disintegrated, denuded, and incomplete", stereotyping households as run by a "strong, independent female and her obverse, the marginal Afro-Caribbean male" (in contrast to the Indo-Caribbean "submissive housewife").

In 1992 statistics, about "40% of Afro-Guyanese women live in a household with a male partner, as against 58% of the Indo-Guyanese women".

==== Research Results ====
During the 1970s and 1980s, the Women in the Caribbean Project (WICP) surveyed women in the light of feminist research. In the 1990s, research shifted from creating visibility to a more "explanatory framework for gendered relations." A major drawback of the research is its almost-exclusive focus on low-income women, which has led to stereotyping and conclusions which fail to represent Caribbean women as a whole. Although some progress had been made towards women's rights by 2019, "only 24.5% of indicators needed to monitor the SDGs from a gender perspective are available"; this creates knowledge gaps in information critical to reaching gender-based goals.

== History ==
Female presence and demographics differ during the major periods of Guyana's history.The origin of Guyanese diversity is the European colonial creation of a "stratified, color-coded social class." Women's roles in a plantation society reflected their racial identity and their perception as "maintainers of culture".

=== Colonial Guiana ===
At the onset of colonial settlement, very few women of European descent immigrated to what was then known as the Guianas; the plantation system drew women and men from Africa as enslaved labor. Very little accommodation was made for pregnant or nursing women in their work hours or punishment. The inevitable unions resulting from this gender disparity were viewed as perversions, although little was done to address rape or sexual violence against women (who were ever granted rights on a par with their colonial, white masters). This led to the racial stratification of society, with appearance-based terms such as mulatto, terceroes, and quadroon defining individuals. English women were seen as "refined and virtuous", a panacea for the colony's social ills.

==== Emancipation ====
Free Afro-Guyanese and those who had been emancipated sought to avoid the plantation system by establishing their own villages, pooling their money to purchase land for agriculture. This village movement was seen as a threat to the sugar estates which still needed labor, and the colonial government enacted laws which prevented the purchase of land. Denied a means of subsistence, the Afro-Guyanese moved into the hinterlands as pork-knocker miners or to urban areas for employment.

==== Indenture ====
The emancipated Afro-Guyanese sought identities other than plantation labor. Sugar estates filled their labor quotas with indentured servants from India and, to a lesser extent, China and Portugal. The first wave of indentured servants from India arrived in 1845.

Recruiters earned higher wages for contracting women, so deception and the "sexual exploitation of single women was not uncommon." Even though women came from an array of backgrounds, some religions or hierarchies made migration "easier than others." Women of lower castes were easy targets for recruitment, since the upper castes could afford to limit the mobility of their women as a means of protection. Caste practices and patriarchal rules were easily disrupted by economic hardship, leading to vulnerability; famines led to higher rates of indenture. The kala pani taboo was associated with impurity and correlated with criminal punishment.

"The regions of Bihar, eastern Uttar Pradesh, and the Cauvery Valley in the South, were characterized by intense cultivation, high population density, and a rigid and stratified society"; labor was drawn from these areas to work in under-utilized areas of India and abroad. About 92 percent of the female workforce between 1876 and 1892 were from the regions of Bihar, the North-Western Provinces and Awadh, and almost 85 percent of the total female immigrants between 1908 and 1917 came from the United Provinces and Agra.

From the 1840s to the 1880s, most women who were recruited for plantations were single or travelling with children. Married women made up a smaller percentage, from 25.57 to 35.98 percent of the total female population emigrating from India to the West Indies between 1845 and 1886. The displacement from India to the colonies impacted gender norms when women entered the recruitment depot. According to Patricia Mohammed, "The men and women who chose to leave India entered into a different negotiation of gender relations than that which they would have experienced had they remained in India." The months-long journey from India to the Caribbean colonies fostered kinship (jahaji) between men and women which paralleled the Afro-Guyanese experience on slave ships, and rules about keeping the genders separated were not enforced. Travel to the West Indies was costly, and the high mortality rate of women during monsoon season led to the Indian Emigration Act VII of 1871, which dictated lower female quotas during those months. The rule was removed in 1879 after it was criticised for interfering with the "material comfort" of husbands, putting women's role as wives before labor. By the 1880s, it was seen as beneficial to encourage stability to prevent the social unrest seen as a symptom of gender imbalance, and the next five years saw an increase to an average of about 74 percent. From 1876 to 1892, female workers were 46.3 percent of the total.

According to colonial sources, Indian women were "subjugated widows fleeing a repressive, tradition-bound society for the free spaces on plantations abroad" or those engaging in "disloyal, immoral sexual behavior." Victorian English policy-makers sought to transport women who would be "good wives and mothers", encouraging the social harmony seen as essential for productive workers. Ordinance 16 of 1894 reduced the term of indenture from five to three years to attract families and women of higher caste. The introduction of Indian women had a polarizing effect on relations between the Afro- and Indo-Guyanese, by enabling the immediate creation of families at the expense of social intermixing. The gender imbalance also had consequences for women in relationships outside the male Indian-worker class. European and Indian intermingling was seen as a threat to the manhood of the workforce; coupled with the injustices inherent in the plantation system, "Most felt that they could do little to 'protect their women' against outsiders". Although the gender ratio seems to imply that women could choose their partners, it was "a choice that was often abrogated by control and violence." Since many unions were unrecognized, violence was a common means of controlling women. During the second half of the 19th century, 87 women were reported killed on estates; in many cases brutally "chopped" by agricultural implements. The murder of wives by husbands was often accompanied by suicide.

Crimes against women during this period were only examined when they caused social unrest (disturbed the plantation labor force), and claims by women were dismissed as resulting from their "loose morals." Pregnancy put women in a vulnerable position for breaking their work contracts, and legal provisions were often disregarded by plantation management. Women faced "a triple exploitation of class, ethnicity, and gender ... giving rise to tensions between competing, though unequal patriarchies - the hegemonizing white, the subordinated Indian, and sometimes, albeit very rarely, with the Afro-Caribbean sector."

Sugar production was labor-intensive; estate owners did little to develop technology to enhance output, putting the industry in a vulnerable position when faced with global competition. The Immigration Ordinance No. 18 of 1891 set a minimum wage for workers during a depression in the sugar industry, setting a lower wage for "non-able-bodied" workers (which often included women).

Unlike the Afro-Guyanese population, who primarily moved to urban areas when they were emancipated, the Indo-Guyanese maintained ties with agriculture after their indenture ended. By 1917, when the indenture system was abolished, nearly all Indo-Guyanese lived on (or worked for) the sugar estates; in 1939, women made up 31.49 percent of total Indian agricultural workers. They remained at the lowest skill level, however, and were rarely "drivers, overseers, or managers." Other domestic tasks, such as food preparation and childcare, were also expected. Formerly-indentured women's roles focused on the "household economy, namely in self-provisioning, peasant and surplus agricultural production and the formation of families." Women took supplementary jobs, such as shopkeepers or vendors of traditional Indian foods (still an important part of general Guyanese cuisine). Landholding, generally a legal right of women, typically was done by a spouse. The extended family (including children) was crucial to raising capital for land and pooling labor, with a "certain degree of power" granted to the male head of household. By the late 19th century, "control over the use and abuse of a woman's labor power was passed to the male authority." Informal patriarchal patterns took shape, with sons obtaining an education and daughters responsible for household tasks until a young marriage. The reconstruction of Hindu or Muslim values conflicted with those of Christian missionaries who sought to "civilize" the Guyanese population. An early resistance to education by the Indo-Guyanese was due to conflicting cultural values and the need for child labor, with increased resistance to educating daughters.

Colonial opinion contrasted Afro-Guyanese women with their Indian counterparts, explaining behavior in the context of racial identity rather than as a reaction to the stratification of the plantation system. The acknowledgement that both groups of women responded similarly to their situations would have undermined the value of indenture as an institution and unified the groups. Socially-acceptable behavior was attributed to indenture as a "civilizing force" for Indians; former slaves were viewed as lazy and apathetic in the absence of discipline offered by subservience. The resulting stereotypes of the Indo-Guyanese homemaker and the independent Afro-Guyanese became entrenched as "immutable cultural essences" of self-identification.

The percentage of women in the Guyanese workforce peaked at 44 percent around 1910, declining until the 1970s. Much of this was due to the prioritization of domestic work over other economic activity, and how side jobs were viewed by outsiders recording the information.

=== Forbes Burnham's co-operative republic ===
Political rhetoric began during the 1950s to unite different ethnic groups in a labor-centred cause, but ethnic divisions were reinforced under People's National Congress (PNC) rule. Subsequent People's Progressive Party (PPP) victories were also based on racial divisions. During the economic collapse of the 1970s, women traded contraband goods in the parallel economy or left the economic and political strife for opportunities abroad.

==== Household Dynamic ====
The difference in historical displacement alters the "family and household structure across ethnicity". The relationship between marriage and motherhood is impacted by emigration and plantation slavery.

Slavery destroyed African family structure – not only separation from family in Africa, but the selling of individuals from a family in subsequent enslaved generations. Afro-Caribbean women tend to display their feminine presence through dominating their households. Thus, motherhood and marriage are not a causal relationship within most Afro-Caribbean households with the implementation of the visiting union or "friending" relationship dynamic.

- In 1992, studies concluded that only 40% of Afro-Guyanese women live with their male counterparts in comparison to the 58% of Indo-Guyanese women.

For those who arrived in British Guiana from India, the loss of the extended family (India's basic social unit) also impacted family structure. The typical Indian family (prevalent in East Africa and Fiji) followed a "classical extended family," a joint household of multiple generations. However, the plantation caste system destroyed the joint family unit. Recruitment of indentured servants prioritized qualified workers (healthy and young) over sustaining family members. In addition, the lack of "eligible single women" further bridged the ability to create new prosperous families.

Factors that increase female-led households:

(1) Widowhood

(2) Male migration or desertion

(3) Female initiative in their relationships

These factors can impact both ethnicities [Afro-Guyanese and Indo-Guyanese women]

=== Since the 1980s ===
A 1995 Human Development Report ranked Guyana "fairly high on its gender-related indicators". Women had control and autonomy at the household and community levels, but had limited access at higher levels to the economic resources available to men. Women outnumber men in health-and-welfare service industries, but men work in fields which directly impact the nation's GDP; motherhood is still viewed at the epitome of womanhood.

Public-sector jobs followed ethnic lines, favoring the Afro-Guyanese. When the Indo-Guyanese-oriented PPP won the 1992 presidential election, the party did not draw Indo-Guyanese women into public-sector jobs. Low wages, job insecurity and lack of benefits defined the female workforce in 2001. Amerindian women are particularly disadvantaged, with economic and educational opportunities based on the coast (away from the hinterland Amerindian settlements). Most Amerindian women are self-employed in agricultural work.

== Legal and political issues ==
In 1946, the Women's Political and Economic Organization was founded by Janet Jagan and Winifred Gaskin. Shortly afterwards, Jagan and her husband formed the People's Progressive Party. The subsequent split and formation of the People's National Congress resulted in a two-party political environment largely based on race; although both parties followed a socialist ideology, female participation in politics did not increase as it did in other socialist countries.

Although women won the right to vote in 1953, they continue to be under-represented in the political realm. Article 29 of the 1980 constitution embodied gender equality; Guyana signed the 1980 Convention on the Elimination of All Forms of Discrimination Against Women and the 1989 Convention on the Rights of the Child, and ratified the equal-rights amendment in 1990. The legal recognition of Common-law unions ensures that property is inheritable by the widows or children of these unions. Rights to property (including housing) can be credited to Parliamentary Secretary at the Ministry of Health, Public Welfare and Housing Agnes Bend-Kirtin-Holder, who had lost property from previous marriages; this made her "determined to change the legal position in relation to women."

A legislative quota was enacted in 2000, when the National Assembly approved the Elections Laws (Amendment) Act No 15. The law established "a minimum of one-third female candidates included on each electoral list". Although representation has improved, recognizable gains have been elusive.

== Contemporary issues ==
Weaknesses in Guyana's infrastructure significantly burden the poorest women, with services such as water and electricity intermittent and directly impacting their income. Healthcare and education have deteriorated since the 1980s. Malnutrition among Amerindian women is widespread, and the percentage of low-birth-weight Amerindian infants is twice the national average.

Family life is shaped by emigration. The "transnational family" provides remittances on which Guyanese families have come to rely, but widens cultural differences by moving abroad and distancing themselves from a "backwards, primitive" Guyana. More Indo-Guyanese women have deferred marriage since the 1970s, often to improve their chances for emigration through sponsorship or an overseas arranged marriage. Amerindian women tend to emigrate to Brazil.

Gender ideology in Guyana parallels the Anglo-Protestant ideal of men as breadwinners and women as caregivers which was established during the colonial period and is seen throughout the Caribbean. Government policy has focused on women in the domestic sphere, and decision-making has been tied to welfare rather than development. Feminism was also seen as antithetical to socialism: a divisive issue which was largely avoided. Gender equality is fragmented by ethnicity, and women's groups are often affiliated with political or religious organizations. Being related to the two major political factions has hindered attempts at a unified women's group. Legislation legalizing abortion and prohibiting domestic violence (in 1995 and 1996, respectively) had support from all women's groups, but have done little to provide access to safe abortions or legal recourse against violence.

=== Organizations ===
- Caribbean Women's Association (CARIWA) - Founded by Viola Burnham in 1970, an arm of the People's National Congress
- Red Thread Women's Development Organisation - Founded by members of the Working People's Alliance
- Women's Progressive Organization - Women's arm of the People's Progressive Party

=== Violence against women ===
Fifty-five percent of respondents to a survey sponsored by the United Nations reported experiencing intimate partner violence (significantly higher than the global average), and 38 percent experienced physical or sexual violence. More than one in ten had experienced physical or sexual violence from a male partner within 12 months of the survey. Although a "persistent belief" exists that Indo-Guyanese women are subjected to greater amount of violence (related to the cultural belief that Indo-Guyanese men are more controlling), the survey results indicated little statistical difference among ethnic groups.

Female inferiority was fueled by male violence and lack of women representation in the public sector. Women were not seen as household breadwinners; further limiting their sexual autonomy and economic agency. Any exhibited dependency on men led to extreme violence.

On plantation estates, women were reported murdered between 1859 and 1907.

=== Disabled women ===
Non-governmental organizations sponsor projects addressing employment for disabled women in Guyana, but they are usually short-term and lack the continuity for sustained employment; national statistics and women's organizations lack data.

=== Sexuality ===
Women's sexuality, defined by heterosexual child-rearing, is otherwise invisible. Stereotypes of butch lesbians as aggressive and violent, and the visibility of such women, endanger them for being seen as a threat to male hegemony. Femme lesbians and cis-gendered women of any sexual orientation or identity, who are established in a community and have children from previous marriages, face less hostility. Male homosexuality is criminalized, and attempts to legislate equality regardless of sexual orientation have been thwarted by religious groups.

=== Sex work ===
The Guyana National AIDS Programme Secretariat initiated the Georgetown SW Project in 1996 to develop outreach and awareness of clinical services (including HIV testing) and a network for the distribution of condoms. Fifteen sex workers were trained in outreach, distributing condoms, educating other sex workers about HIV and other sexually transmitted infections, condom negotiation and other safer-sex skills, and referring them to health services. Surveys of female sex workers in Georgetown indicated high rates of HIV: 25 percent in 1993, 46 percent in 1997, and 30.6 percent in 2006. Amerindian women are a disproportionate number of sex workers in Guyana; in the hinterland, sex work is often associated with mining camps which employ men from coastal areas.

=== Women in Politics ===
The country has had a female president, Janet Jagan.

=== Women in Education ===
British authorities and plantation owners discouraged education amongst East Indian children. In fear that educated individuals will result in escapees and revolts. The Compulsory Education Act of 1876 excluded east Indian children.

East Indian indentured servants were unskilled and uneducated, making them strictly qualified for agricultural work within Guyana. Without a formal education, East Indian women were successful in milk trading and gardening. Women comprised "77% of the East Indian milk sellers in 1891," with a decrease in percentage within two decades. Despite the later implementation of Western education in assimilation tactics, East Indians remained largely uneducated. Schools conducted in English, but most East Indian children still spoke in their native Indian language. And formal education was required to perform urban-based careers outside of milk trading and gardening.

In 1946, conducted research established the 41.3% difference in literacy rates between Indo- and Afro-Guyanese populations. The English literacy rate of East Indians (above ten years of age) was 56% to the 97.3% literacy rate of Afro-Guyanese communities.

Female Guyanese students have outperformed their male counterparts in regional examinations, and more women than men attend universities to advance their careers.

=== Women's Employment ===
Western assimilation influenced the trajectories of socio-economic prosperity within Guyanese communities. Learning to be literate in English was conditioning for urban employment; formal education was a requirement.

Exploitation and plantation resistance made Afro-Caribbean women dominant figures in paid workforce labor. Afro-Caribbean women to dominated urban-based fields.

== See also ==
- List of Guyanese women writers
- Domestic violence in Guyana
- Human trafficking in Guyana
- Abortion in Guyana
