= Address confidentiality program =

Program for crime survivors and others needing privacy

In the United States an address confidentiality program allows survivors of domestic violence, sexual assault, stalking or other types of crime to be assigned a legal substitute address that is different from their actual residential address, in order to keep their location confidential. Program participants can receive mail at the substitute address and it will be forwarded for free, and are able to use the substitute address in government records. In some states or jurisdictions, reproductive healthcare workers and employees of agencies that assist survivors of domestic violence or stalking are also eligible.

Survivors usually apply through a state's Secretary of State office, although some programs are run through other state agencies such as the Office of the Attorney General. Once a survivor is admitted to the program, they will receive an assigned PO box or other address that will legally substitute their residential address on public records, such as voting registration.

According to the National Network to End Domestic Violence,

Address Confidentiality Programs (ACP) and Confidential Voter Listings are programs administered by the state enabling victims of domestic violence (and sometime victims of sexual assault and/or stalking) to participate in the voting process without fear of being found by their abusers. ACPs generally provide a substitute address for all public records. Confidential Voter Listings only provide confidentiality on election-related public records.

== States with Confidential Address Programs ==
State (link to state site)	Voter Registration	Drivers License	School Registration	Other Services (Note: marriage licenses, name changes, and child support are services offered by some states. Many states also let participants receive legal service documents.)	Phone/Contact
Arizona	yes	yes	yes	yes	602-542-1653
Arkansas	no	yes	no	no	501-682-7052
California	yes - by mail	yes	yes	yes	877-322-5227
Colorado	yes	yes	yes	yes	303-866-2208
Connecticut	yes	yes	yes	yes	multiple numbers depending on location
Delaware	yes	yes	no info	no info	(800) 870-1790
Florida	yes - absentee	yes	no info	no info	(800) 226-6667
Idaho	yes	yes	yes	yes	(208) 332-2836
Illinois	yes - absentee	yes	yes	no info	(844) 916-0295
Indiana	yes - absentee	yes	yes	yes	(800) 321-1907
Iowa	yes - absentee	yes	yes	yes	(515) 725-7233
Kansas	yes	yes	yes	yes	(785) 296-3806
Kentucky	yes - absentee	no	no	no	(502) 564-3490
Louisiana	yes - absentee	yes	yes	yes	800.825.3805
Maine	yes - absentee	no info	yes	yes	(207) 626–8400
Maryland	yes	yes	yes	no info	410-260-3875
Massachusetts	yes	yes	yes	no info	1-866-SAFE-ADD
Michigan	yes	yes	yes	yes	313-456-0190
Minnesota	yes - by mail	separate application	yes	yes	(866) 723-3035
Mississippi	yes	yes	yes	no info	(800) 829-6766
Missouri	yes	yes	yes	yes	(866) 509-1409
Montana	yes	no info	no info	no info	1-800-498-6455
Nebraska	yes - early voting	yes	yes	no info	(866) 227-6327
Nevada	yes - absentee	yes	yes	yes	888-432-6189
New Hampshire	yes - absentee	yes	yes	yes	(603) 271-1240
New Jersey	yes	no info	no info	no info	1 (877) 218-9133
New Mexico	yes - absentee	no info	no info	no info	1-800-477-3632
New York	yes	yes	yes	yes	(855) 350-4595
North Carolina	yes	yes	yes	yes	(919) 716-6785
Ohio	yes	yes	yes	yes	(614) 995-2255
Oklahoma	yes - absentee	yes	yes	yes	(866) 227-7784
Oregon	yes	yes	yes	yes	503-373-1323
Pennsylvania	yes	yes	yes	yes	1.800.563.6399
Rhode Island	yes	no	no	no	1-877-218-9133
Texas	yes - by mail	yes	yes	yes	1-888-832-2322
Utah	yes	yes	yes	yes	801-538-1600
Vermont	yes - absentee	yes	yes	yes	802-828-0586
Virginia	yes - limited confidentiality	yes	yes	yes	804-786-2071
Washington	yes	yes	yes	yes	(360) 753-2972
Washington, D.C.	yes	yes	yes	yes	(844) 443-5732
West Virginia	yes	yes	yes	yes	1-866-767-8683
Wisconsin	yes - separate application	yes	yes	yes	(608) 266-6613

== Bank accounts and address confidentiality ==
The rules implementing the Bank Secrecy Act require a financial institution to implement a Customer Identification Program that includes procedures that enable it to form a reasonable belief that it knows the true identity of its customers. The rules also require that a financial institution obtain a residential or business street address from each customer. Unfortunately, the substitute address under an Address Confidentiality Program does not meet the standards.

The Financial Crimes Enforcement Network issued a letter ruling to help the situation. The Financial Crimes Enforcement Network regulations also allow: "If the individual customer does not have a residential or business street address, then the rules permit the individual customer to provide a "residential or business street address of next of kin or of another contact individual."

In FIN-2009-R003, the Financial Crimes Enforcement Network found: "A customer who participates in a state-created ACP shall be treated as not having a residential or business street address and a secretary of state, or other state entity serving as a designated agent of the customer consistent with the terms of the ACP, will act as another contact individual for the purpose of complying with FinCEN's rules. Therefore, a financial institution should collect the street address of the ACP sponsoring agency for purposes of meeting its CIP address requirement."

== Coronavirus disease 2020 ==
On September 23, 2020, the Governor of California, Gavin Newsom signed executive order N-80-20 allowing local health officers and public health officials access to the state's Safe at Home program, due to their being "subject to threats and other harassment, including threats and harassment targeted at their places of residence, which threatens to chill the performance of their critical duties."

== See also ==
- Domestic violence
- Outline of domestic violence
