= Domestic violence in Tajikistan =

Domestic violence

Domestic violence in Tajikistan is very high, due to traditional Tajik muslim family values, as well as a reluctance by the authorities to intervene in what is viewed in Tajikistan as a "private family matter".

== Extent ==
More than 40% of Tajik women have been subjected to physical, psychological, or sexual violence by their husbands or in-laws, with rates higher in rural and low income families. One woman told Amnesty International that during her five years of marriage, she was not allowed to leave her husband's home, while another reported that she had been raped by her boyfriend, who threatened to kill her if she told anybody, and continued to coerce her into sex for four months. The law prohibits rape, which is punishable by up to 20 years’ imprisonment. There is no separate statute for spousal rape.

Many women are subjected to harsh treatment by husbands or in-laws upon marriage. Most Tajik women, especially those in the lower class leave school early to be wed, leaving them without an adequate education, and are often pushed into the lowest paying jobs, leaving them economically dependent on their husbands.

In 2013, Tajikistan enacted the Law on the Prevention of Domestic Violence, its first law against domestic violence.

== Tajik social attitudes ==
Domestic violence is often seen as justified by society: a UNICEF survey found that 62.4% of women in Tajikistan justify wife beating if the wife goes out without telling the husband; 68% if she argues with him; 47.9% if she refuses to have sex with him. Another survey also found that women and men largely agreed that it was justifiable for a husband or mother-in-law to beat a wife/daughter-in-law who had "talked back", disobeyed, left the house without permission, had not prepared dinner on time, or had not cared for the children properly.

Police are often unwilling to intervene in domestic violence incidents. The de facto policy of the authorities is to promote reconciliation. The police often blame the women for their abuse, and sometimes insult women trying to report abuse. Women trying to report cases of abuse to the police are often told to file a complaint, or are sent away. Judiciary, police, and medical staff are not trained to deal with cases of domestic violence. Abusive husbands are rarely arrested or prosecuted.

== See also ==
- Women in Tajikistan
