= Effects of domestic violence on children =

The effects of domestic violence on children have a tremendous impact on the well-being and developmental growth of children witnessing it. Children can be exposed to domestic violence in a multitude of ways and goes beyond witnessing or overhearing, although there is disagreement in how it should be measured. Children who are exposed to domestic violence in the home often believe that they are to blame, live in a constant state of fear, and are 15 times more likely to be victims of child abuse. Close observation during an interaction can alert providers to the need for further investigation and intervention, such as dysfunctions in the physical, behavioral, emotional, and social areas of life, and can aid in early intervention and assistance for child victims.

== Symptoms children may have while exposed to domestic violence ==
=== Physical symptoms ===
In general, children who are exposed to domestic violence in the home can suffer an immense amount of physical symptoms along with their emotional and behavioral state of despair. These children may complain of general aches and pain, such as headaches and stomach aches. They may also have irritable and irregular bowel habits, cold sores, and problems with bed-wetting. These complaints have been associated with depressive disorders in children, a common emotional effect of domestic violence. Along with these general complaints of not feeling well, children exposed to domestic violence may also appear nervous, as previously mentioned, and have short attention spans. These children display some of the same symptoms as children who have been diagnosed with attention deficit hyperactivity disorder (ADHD). On the reverse, these children may show symptoms of fatigue and constant tiredness. They may fall asleep in school due to the lack of sleep at home. Much of their night may be spent listening to or witnessing violence within the home. Children who are victims of domestic violence are often frequently ill, and may suffer from poor personal hygiene. Children exposed to domestic violence also have a tendency to partake in high risk play activities, self-abuse, and suicide.

==== Prenatal ====
The physical effects of domestic violence on children, unlike the effects of direct abuse, can start when they are a fetus in their mother's womb, which can result in low infant birth weights, premature birth, excessive bleeding, and fetal death due to the mother's physical trauma and emotional stress. Increased maternal stress during the times of abuse, especially when combined with smoking and drug abuse, can also lead to premature deliveries and low weight babies.

==== Infants ====
Infant children who are present in the home where domestic violence occurs often fall victim to being "caught in the crossfire." They may suffer physical injuries from unintentional trauma as their parent is suffering from abuse. Infants may be inconsolable and irritable, have a lack of responsiveness secondary to lacking the emotional and physical attachment to their mother, have developmental delays, and have excessive diarrhea from both trauma and stress. Infants are most affected by the environment of abuse because their brain hasn't fully developed.

==== Older children ====
Physical effects of exposure to domestic violence in older children are less evident than behavioral and emotional effects. The trauma that children experience when they are exposed to domestic violence in the home, plays a major role in their development and physical well-being. Older children can sometimes turn the stress towards behavioral problems. Sometimes children who are exposed to the abuse turn to drugs, hoping to take the pain away. The children, however, will exhibit physical symptoms associated with their behavioral or emotional problems, such as being withdrawn from those around them, becoming non-verbal, and exhibiting regressed behaviors such as being clingy and whiney. Anxiety often accompanies a physical symptom in children who are exposed to domestic violence in the home. If their anxiety progresses to more physical symptoms, they may show signs of tiredness from lack of sleep and weight and nutritional changes from poor eating habits.

=== Behavioral symptoms ===
Children exposed to domestic violence are likely to develop behavioral problems, such as regressing, exhibiting out of control behavior, and imitating behaviors. Children may think that violence is an acceptable behavior of intimate relationships and become either the victim or the abuser. Some warning signs are bed-wetting, nightmares, distrust of adults, acting tough, having problems becoming attached to other people, and isolating themselves from their close friends and family. Another behavioral response to domestic violence may be that the child may lie in order to avoid confrontation and excessive attention-getting.

A source that supports the stated behavioral effects of domestic violence on children is a study that has been done by Albert Bandura (1977). The study that was presented was about introducing children to a role model that is aggressive, non-aggressive, and a control group that showed no role model. This study is called, "The Bobo Doll Experiment", the experiment influenced the children to act similar to their role model towards the doll itself. The children who were exposed to violence acted with aggression, the children who were exposed to a non-aggressive environment were quite friendly. As a result, children can be highly influenced by what is going on in their environment.

Adolescents are in jeopardy of academic failure, school drop-out, and substance abuse.

Their behavior is often guarded and secretive about their family members and they may become embarrassed about their home situation. Adolescents generally don't like to invite friends over and they spend their free time away from home. Denial and aggression are their major forms of problem-solving. Teens cope with domestic violence by blaming others, encountering violence in a relationship or by running away from home.

==== Teen dating violence ====
An estimated 1/5 to 1/3 of teenagers subject to viewing domestic violent situations experience teen dating violence, regularly abusing or being abused by their partners verbally, mentally, emotionally, sexually or physically. 30% to 50% of dating relationships can exhibit the same cycle of escalating violence in their marital relationships.

=== Physical symptoms ===
Physical symptoms are a major effect on children due to parental domestic violence. In a study, 52% of 59 children yelled from another room, 53% of 60 children yelled from the same room, a handful actually called someone for help, and some just became significantly involved themselves during the abusive occurrence. When the violent situation is at its peak and a child tries to intervene, logically a person would have thought that in order to save their child from harm, parents would control themselves, however, statistics show otherwise. It is said that about 50% of the abusers also end up abusing their children. Another alarming statistic is that 25% of the victims of the abusive relationship also tend to get violent with their children. The violence imposed on these children can in some cases be life-threatening. If a parent is pregnant during the abuse, the unborn child is at risk of lifelong impairments or at risk of life itself. Researchers have studied, amongst perinatal and neonatal statistics, mothers who experience domestic violence had more than double the risk of child mortality.

=== Emotional symptoms ===
Children exposed to violence in their home often have conflicting feelings towards their parents. For instance, distrust and affection often coexist for the abuser. The child becomes overprotective of the victim and feels sorry for them.

They often develop anxiety, fearing that they may be injured or abandoned, that the child's parent being abused will be injured, or that they are to blame for the violence that is occurring in their homes. Grief, shame, and low self-esteem are common emotions that children exposed to domestic violence experience.

==== Depression ====
Depression is a common problem for children who experience domestic violence. The child often feels helpless and powerless. More girls internalize their emotions and show signs of depression than boys. Boys are more apt to act out with aggression and hostility. Exposure to violence in the home can give the child the idea that nothing is safe in the world and that they are not worth being kept safe which contributes to their feelings of low self-worth and depression.

==== Anger ====
Some children act out through anger and are more aggressive than other children. Even in situations that do not call for it, children will respond with anger. Children and young people particularly highlighted angry feelings as a consequence of experiencing domestic violence. Physical aggression can also manifest towards the victim from the children as the victim does not have the ability to develop authority and control over them.

==== Post-traumatic stress disorder ====
Post-traumatic stress disorder (PTSD) can result in children from exposure to domestic violence. Symptoms of this are nightmares, insomnia, anxiety, increased alertness to the environment, having problems concentrating, and can lead to physical symptoms. If the child experiences chronic early maltreatment within the caregiving relationship, then complex PTSD can result.

==== Role reversal ====
There is sometimes role reversal between the child and the parent and the responsibilities of the victim who is emotionally and psychologically dysfunctional are transferred to the child. In this situation, the parents treat their child as a therapist or confidant, and not as their child. They are forced to mature faster than the average child. They take on household responsibilities such as cooking, cleaning, and caring for younger siblings. The responsibilities that they take on are beyond normally assigned chores and are not age appropriate. The child becomes socially isolated and is not able to participate in activities that are normal for a child their age. The parentified child is at risk for becoming involved in rocky relationships because they have been isolated and are not experienced at forming successful relationships. Also, they tend to become perfectionists because they are forced to live up to such high expectations for their parents.

=== Social symptoms ===
Children exposed to domestic violence frequently do not have the foundation of safety and security that is normally provided by the family. The children experience a desensitization to aggressive behavior, poor anger management, poor problem solving skills, and learn to engage in exploitative relationships.

- Symptoms include isolation from friends and relatives in an effort to stay close to siblings and victimized parent.
- The adolescent may display these symptoms by joining a gang or becoming involved in dating relationships that mimic the learned behavior.

Children exposed to domestic violence require a safe nurturing environment and the space and respect to progress at their own pace. The caretaker should provide reassurance and an increased sense of security by providing explanations and comfort for the things that worry the children, like loud noises. Children should develop and maintain positive contact with significant others such as distant family members. All family members are encouraged to become involved in community organizations designed to assist families in domestic violence situations.

== Effects on infants and toddlers ==
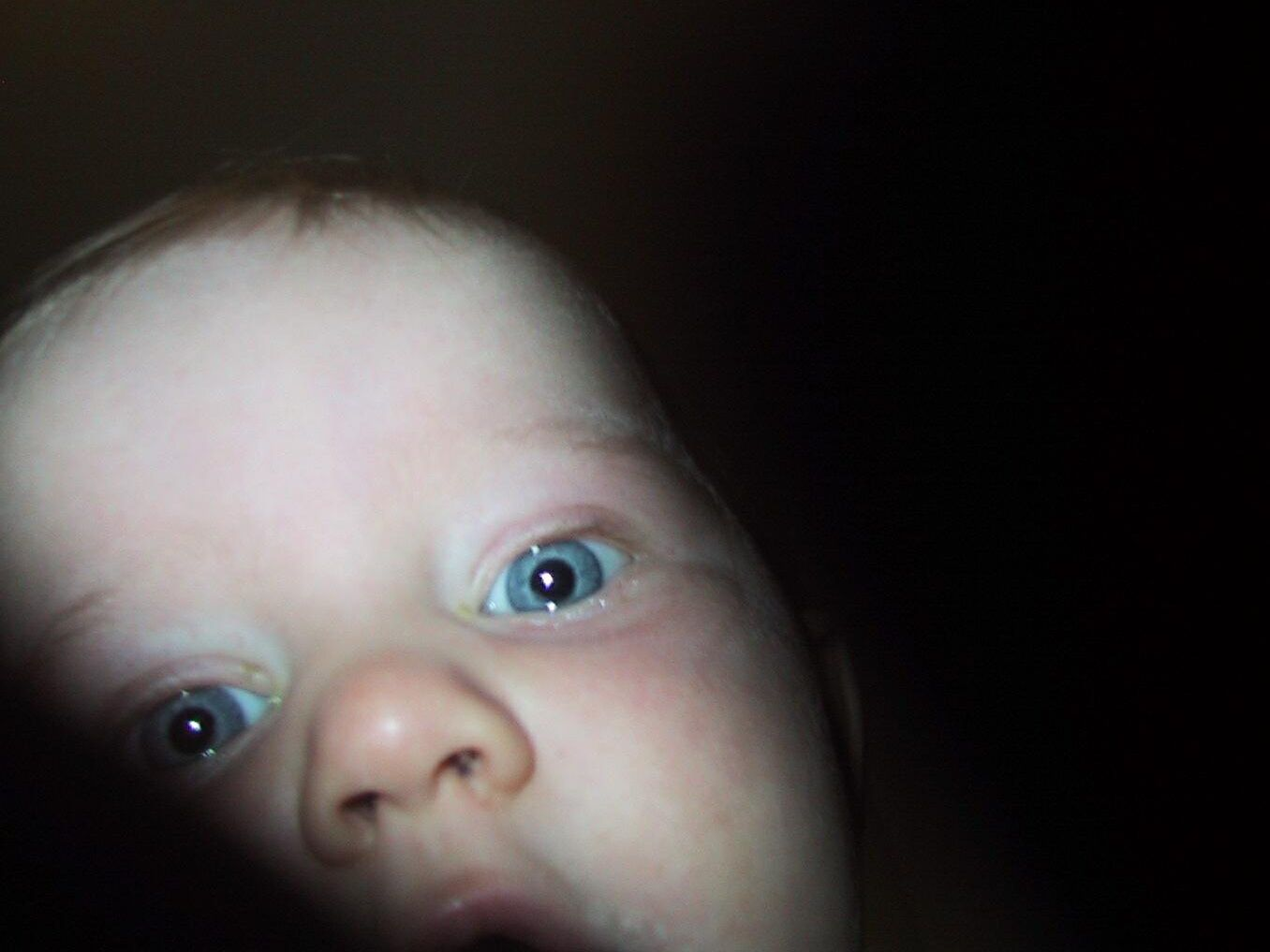
Frightened toddler

Children exposed to domestic violence at infancy often experience an inability to bond and form secure attachments, often resulting in intensified startled reactions and an inhibited sense of exploration and play.

Children may portray a wide range of reactions to the exposure of domestic violence in their home. The preschool and kindergarten child does not understand the meaning of the abuse and may believe they did something wrong, this self-blame may cause the child feelings of guilt, worry, and anxiety. Younger children do not have the ability to express their feelings verbally and these emotions can cause behavioral problems. They may become withdrawn, non-verbal, and have regressed behaviors such as clinging and whining. Other common behaviors for a child being a victim of domestic violence are eating and sleeping difficulty, and concentration problems.

Preschoolers living with violence internalize the learned gender roles associated with victimization, for instance seeing males as perpetrators and females as victims. This symptom presents itself as the preschooler imitating learned behaviors of intimidation and abuse. The preschooler may present with aggressive behavior, lashing out, defensive behavior, or extreme separation anxiety from the primary caregiver.

Statistics show that a child who is exposed to violence between their parents or guardians is more likely to carry on violent behaviors in their own adult lives. "Even when child witnesses do not suffer physical injury, the emotional consequences of viewing or hearing violent acts are severe and long-lasting. In fact, children who witness violence often experience many of the same symptoms and lasting effects as children who are victims of violence themselves, including [PTSD]." Also in the article Breaking the Cycle of Violence, "it is clearly in the best interest of the child and criminal justice system to handle child victims and witnesses in the most effective and sensitive manner possible. A number of studies have found the following: reducing the number of interviews of children can minimize psychological harm to child victims (Tedesco & Schnell, 1987); testifying is not necessarily harmful to children if adequate preparation is conducted (Goodman et al., 1992; Oates et al., 1995; Whitcomb, Goodman, Runyon, and Hoak, 1994); and, having a trusted person help the child prepare for court and be with the child when he or she testified reduced the anxiety of the child (Henry, 1997).

=== Effects on exposed infants ===
- Cries excessively, screaming
- Digestive problems
- Failure to thrive
- Feeding and sleeping routines are disrupted
- Frequent illness
- Irritability, sadness, anxiety
- Low weight
- Need for attachment is disrupted
- No appetite
- Sleeping problems
- Startles easily

=== Effects on exposed toddlers ===
- Insomnia and parasomnias
- Lack feelings of safety
- Regressive behaviors
- Separation/stranger anxiety

=== Dual exposure ===
Children exposed to domestic violence face greater risk for other forms of maltreatment such as physical abuse and neglect than other children. Parents who are violent with one another are more likely to physically abuse their children. The consequences of child abuse and domestic violence exposure are similar; children exposed to domestic violence exhibit emotional, psychological, and behavioral consequences that are almost identical to one another. Some researchers suggest dual exposure as a "double whammy" effect, because children receive double exposure to traumatic events and thus react twofold to the abuse and exposure to domestic violence. Children who experience the "double whammy" effect can exhibit pathological fear, guilt, isolation, and low self-esteem. Psychological outcomes in adulthood for these children can include depression, anxiety, and post-traumatic stress disorder (PTSD). Children who experience dual exposure to both physical abuse and domestic violence possess more behavioral problems than those who experience only one or the other.

These outcomes have been documented as leading to behavioral problems that include school dropout, violence, teen pregnancy, substance abuse, eating disorders, and even suicide attempts. A study following children from preschool through adolescence found that young children exposed to domestic violence and child abuse were more likely to experience anti-social behaviors in their adolescence. Young children exposed to both domestic violence and child abuse were also more likely to commit an assault and participate in delinquent behavior in their adolescence than those not exposed at all. Lastly, the Adverse Childhood Experiences study (ACE) found a connection between multiple categories of childhood trauma (e.g., child abuse, household dysfunction including domestic violence, and child neglect) and health/behavioral outcomes later in life. The more traumas a child was exposed to, the greater risk for disabilities, social problems, and adverse health outcomes. More recently, researchers have used elements of this model to continue analysis into different aspects of trauma, stressful experiences, and later development.

== See also ==
- Effects of domestic corporal punishment on children
- Children's rights movement
- Narcissistic parent
- Parental abuse by children
- Parental bullying of children
- Youth rights
- Index of children's rights articles
