= Linda Saltzman =

American public health researcher

Linda E. Saltzman
- Born: September 8, 1949; Bloomington, Indiana, US
- Died: March 8, 2005 (aged 55)
- Education: Brown University; Florida State University
- Known for: Violence prevention
- Scientific career
- Fields: Public health
- Institutions: Centers for Disease Control
- Thesis: A Longitudinal Study of the Deterrence Model (1977)

Linda Ellen Saltzman (September 8, 1949 – March 9, 2005) was an American public health researcher who worked at the Centers for Disease Control (CDC) from 1984 until her death in 2005. She was especially known for her research on domestic violence, which has been credited with helping to define the entire field. She helped define what intimate partner and sexual violence meant, improving data collection and public health surveillance on violence against women. She has been described as "...one of the CDC’s top experts on violence, and one of the violence prevention movement’s most trusted allies." In 2007, the CDC established the Linda Saltzman New Investigator Award in her memory; it is awarded biennially to a new researcher in the field of domestic violence.
