= Family Response Unit =

Unit of the Afghan National Police

The Family Response Unit is an office of the Afghan National Police which deals with domestic violence and female and child victims of crime, as well as handling female suspects. The unit was founded in 2006 in Kabul, and was staffed by policewomen trained by the United Nations Assistance Mission in Afghanistan (UNAMA).
