= Domestic violence in Guyana =

Domestic violence in Guyana is widespread and crosses racial and socioeconomic lines. The law prohibits domestic violence, gives women the right to seek prompt protection, and allows victims to seek protection, occupation, or tenancy orders from a magistrate. Penalties for violation of protection orders include fines up to US$54 (G$10,000) and 12 months' imprisonment; however, this legislation frequently is not enforced.

The government uses laws and policies against domestic violence with some measure of success; the problems lie with the failure of those responsible for implementation. Magistrates and magistrate court staff are often insensitive to the problem of domestic violence and to their roles in ensuring implementation of the law. In addition, not all police officers fully understand provisions of the law.

NGOs report a widespread perception that some police officers and magistrates could be bribed to make cases of domestic violence "go away." The government also does not prosecute cases in which the alleged victim or victim's family agreed to drop the case in exchange for a monetary payment out of court. NGOs assert the need for a specialized Family Court.

Domestic violence is a problem in all regions of the country. Enforcement of the domestic violence laws is especially weak in the interior, where police do not have as strong a presence and courts meet only once a quarter.

Between January and September 2006, Help and Shelter handled 414 abuse cases, including child, spousal, nonspousal, and other domestic abuse; 297 of the cases involved spousal abuse directed against women. Help and Shelter, which received private donor and some government funding, ran a free shelter for victims of domestic violence and operated a hotline to counsel victims.

NGOs run public service announcements and train police officers, teachers, nurses, agricultural workers, religious groups, and health clinics to sensitize them to domestic violence. Domestic violence training is part of the curriculum of the Police Training College. There is a Task Force on Violence against Women whose membership includes representatives from NGOs, law enforcement, the health community, and youth. The Task Force has gathered data in preparation for drafting a national policy on domestic violence.

== See also ==
- Women in Guyana
- Crime in Guyana
