= Narcissistic parent =

A narcissistic parent or toxic parent is a parent affected by narcissism or narcissistic personality disorder. Typically, narcissistic parents are exclusively and possessively close to their children and are threatened by their children's growing independence. Narcissistic parents are self-absorbed, often to the point of grandiosity. They also tend to be inflexible and lack the empathy necessary for child raising.

Narcissistic parenting may present in different forms, including grandiose and vulnerable expressions of narcissism. Grandiose narcissistic parents may be overly controlling, exhibit dominance, and the need for appreciation and affection, while vulnerable narcissistic parents may exude sensitivity to criticism, emotional withdrawal, and indirect control strategies. Both forms have been associated with negative parent-child relationships.

== Characteristics in parents ==
Narcissism, as described in Sigmund Freud’s clinical study, includes behaviors such as self-aggrandizement, self-esteem, vulnerability, fear of failure, fear of losing people's affection, reliance on defense mechanisms, perfectionism, and interpersonal conflict.

To maintain their self-esteem and protect their vulnerable true selves, narcissists seek to control others' behavior, particularly that of their children, whom they view as extensions of themselves. Thus, narcissistic parents may speak of "carrying the torch", maintaining the family image, or making the mother or father proud. They may reproach their children for exhibiting weakness, being too dramatic, being selfish, or not meeting expectations. Children of narcissists tend to learn to play their part and to show off their special skills, especially in public or for others.

Destructive narcissistic parents have a pattern of consistently needing to be the focus of attention, exaggerating, seeking compliments, and putting their children down. Punishment in the form of blame, criticism or emotional blackmail, and attempts to induce guilt may be used to ensure compliance with the parent's wishes and fuel their need for narcissistic supply.

== Fragile self-esteem ==
Narcissistic personality disorder has been associated with an unstable self-esteem where individuals may develop a dependence on admiration, validation, and external feedback. These factors have been known to influence interpersonal relationships which can become conditional and performance-based. These characteristics and patterns have been identified in clinical and research contexts as common traits of narcissistic personality disorder.

With a fragile self-esteem, these individuals often struggle with empathy outside themselves, including challenges in recognizing and responding to emotions of others. Narcissists may show signs of conflict, confusion, or silence when responding to others emotions. In addition, there is a chance for struggle with regulating emotions, and responding strongly, often times negatively, to criticism and failure. These regulation problems explain the tendency to control behaviors of others, a heightened sensitivity to independence in their children, and limited emotional vulnerability. The instability in self-esteem has been identified as a key feature of narcissistic personality in clinical literature, which influence how these individuals interact with others including their children.

== Parenting style ==
Parenting styles are patterns of practices and behaviors that parents use when raising their children. One widely known parenting style, authoritarian parenting, is commonly associated with high levels of control and the demand for high expectations from their children. Parents using this style expect obedience, respect, enforcement of implemented strict rules, and to remove independence and autonomy in their children.

Research suggests that certain traits narcissistic parents have correlate to authoritarian parenting styles. Authoritarian parenting has characteristics including but not limited to a high levels of control, high expectations, strict rules, and respect and obedience without explanation. Authoritarian parents are more likely than authoritative and permissive parenting styles to have less emotional responsiveness and empathy, which may shape narcissistic parenting patterns. Not all parents with narcissistic traits use authoritarian parenting styles as parenting styles vary across individuals and cultures, but research has suggested that certain traits and aspects of authoritarian parenting styles and narcissistic parents are related.

== Children of narcissists ==
Narcissism tends to occur intergenerationally, with narcissistic parents producing either narcissistic or codependent children. While a self-confident or good-enough parent can allow a child autonomous development, the narcissistic parent may instead use the child to promote their own image. A parent concerned with self-enhancement, or with being mirrored and admired by their child, may leave the child feeling controlled by the parent's emotional and intellectual demands.

Some common issues in narcissistic parenting result from a lack of appropriate, responsible nurturing. This may lead to a child feeling empty, feeling insecure in loving relationships, developing fears, mistrusting others, experiencing identity conflict, and developing commitment issues.

=== Short-term and long-term effects ===
Because of their vulnerability, children are severely affected by the behavior of a narcissistic parent. A narcissistic parent may often abuse the normal parental role of guiding children and being the primary decision-maker in a child's life, becoming overly possessive and controlling. This possessiveness and excessive control weaken the child; the parent sees the child simply as an extension of the parent. This may affect the child's imagination and level of curiosity, and the child often develops an extrinsic style of motivation. This heightened level of control may be due to the narcissistic parent's need to maintain the child's dependence on them.

Narcissistic parents are quick to anger, putting their children at risk for physical and emotional abuse. To avoid anger and punishment, children of abusive parents often resort to complying with their parent's every demand. This affects both the child's well-being and ability to make logical decisions on their own, and as adults, such individuals often lack self-confidence and the ability to gain control over their lives. Identity crisis, loneliness, and struggle with self-expression are also commonly seen in children raised by a narcissistic parent. The struggle to discover one's self as an adult stems from the substantial amount of projective identification that the now adult experiences as a child.

=== Mental health effects ===
Studies have found that children of narcissistic parents have significantly higher rates of depression and lower self-esteem during adulthood than those who did not perceive their caregivers as narcissistic. The parent's lack of empathy towards their child contributes to this, as the child's desires are often denied, their feelings restrained, and their overall emotional well-being ignored.

Children of narcissistic parents are taught to submit and conform, causing them to lose touch of themselves as individuals. This can lead to the child possessing very few memories of feeling appreciated or loved by their parents for being themselves, as they instead associate the love and appreciation with conformity. Children may benefit with distance from the narcissistic parent. Some children of narcissistic parents resort to leaving home during adolescence if they grow to view the relationship with their parent(s) as toxic.

The results of a prior study indicated that narcissistic parenting behaviors have an impact on children's self-esteem far into adulthood. A lot of respondents also mentioned that they needed the approval or affirmation of others in order to feel competent or deserving, and some said that their sense of self depended entirely on how "successful" they perceived themselves to be in terms of their appearance, social life, or academic or professional accomplishments. Respondents also mentioned how these consequences affected their friendships and romantic relationships as adults, and one participant raised concern for how these effects would affect her children.

Research suggests that narcissistic parenting traits are associated with long-term effects on a child's self-esteem and identity. Adult children who have experienced narcissistic parenting have a chance of developing a dependency on external validation, with their identity formed by perceived success in performance, careers, social status, education, and appearance. Studies indicate that approval from others in close relationships is necessary to feel worthy or competent. This reliance on validation, approval, and feedback of others may lead to the development of a fragile or unstable self-concept.

Along with self-esteem, adult children of narcissistic parents have described experiencing love as conditional, with affection and validation dependent on their ability to meet parental expectations. In these types of family environments, children may learn to associate love with performance rather than intrinsic self-worth, which can interfere with the development of their identity. This pattern can affect a child's ability to develop independence outside their parents' approval. Research has also suggested that this parenting style may be associated with difficulties in emotional regulation and insecure attachment styles, further complicating the challenges these children may face in adulthood. As children of narcissistic parents age, research indicates that there will be a higher chance of creating close interpersonal relationships because of people-pleasing behaviors, emotional insecurities, and fear of rejection. On the other hand, outcomes may vary depending on the individual's experiences in this environment, culturally, and other factors, and not all children of narcissistic parents experience the same effects.

== Narcissistic parenting in literature and film ==
Narcissistic parenting occasionally serves as a central theme in literary and cinematic works. Notable examples include Ingmar Bergman’s Autumn Sonata (1978), Frank Perry’s Mommie Dearest (1981), and Janet Fitch’s novel White Oleander (1999).

In his 1944 drama The Glass Menagerie, Tennessee Williams portrays the character of Amanda Wingfield as a quintessential representation of vulnerable narcissism. From a psychoanalytic perspective, Wingfield utilizes her children as "self-objects" (as defined by Heinz Kohut) to bolster her own fragile self-esteem.

== See also ==
- Child abuse
- Dysfunctional family
- Effects of domestic violence on children
- Helicopter parent
- Parental bullying of children
- Parenting styles
- Narcissistic personality disorder
