= Campaign Against Domestic Violence =

Advocacy organization

The Campaign Against Domestic Violence (CADV) was founded in 1991 to fight for better resources to deal with domestic violence, to promote awareness of domestic violence, campaign for legal change and to raise domestic violence as a workplace issue.

The campaign was launched by members of Militant to fight against proposals that later became the Child Support Act (1993) and attracted support from five trade unions and various trade union branches including Tower NUM.

The campaign organised public conferences of supporters of up to 500 people. as well as protests outside prisons where women have been jailed for violence when fighting against domestic violence.

== Programme ==
- Secure funding and expansion of facilities and services for women experiencing domestic violence, such as help-lines, refuges, specialist courts and women's advocates.
- Expansion in quality provision of refuges and social housing, including a pool of emergency housing.
- Increases in Income Support. Social Fund emergency grants not loans. A decent minimum wage.
- More support for children who have been affected by domestic violence, including childcare provision for under threes and support services for children.
- Employers to provide paid time off and redeployment for women fleeing domestic violence.
- Preventative education in schools about domestic violence. Programmes for male perpetrators in all areas.
- Scrap benefit penalties for lone parents. Women to be always made aware of their rights. Women on Income Support to be allowed to keep all child support payments.
- Nationally coordinated programme of domestic violence awareness training and good practice for all relevant staff i.e. housing, health, education, police, legal, social services, benefit workers etc.
- Legal aid threshold to be raised so that all women can afford legal action in relation to domestic violence.
- Safeguards for women and children in court welfare meetings and contact situations.
- Review of all cases of women in prison for killing violent partners and all other women in prison where domestic violence was a factor. Change the law on provocation and self-defence to take account of cumulative violence and abuse.
- Government to publish an annual report of the impact of all aspects of legal changes and service reforms related to domestic violence.
