= Dangerous restart =

A dangerous restart occurs when power or energy is applied to a device whose "on / off" switch was in the "on" position when power was applied. In the United States the National Institute for Occupational Safety and Health (NIOSH) refers to this hazard as "The Uncontrolled Release of Mechanical, Electrical and Other Types of Hazardous Energy"

The dangerous restart hazard is currently addressed by the Occupational Safety and Health Administration (OSHA), the National Fire Protection Association (NFPA) and the Canadian Standards Association (CSA) with mandatory requirements for hazard reduction through the use of industrial grade safety devices.

The mandatory safety devices require installation by licensed electricians. The cost for implementing this safety device including installation averages between US$300 and US$1,000 depending on electrical requirements of the machinery and local electrician rates.

Due to the cost and size restriction, there are currently no requirements for restart hazard reduction on appliances, small tools and handheld power equipment.

There are currently an average of 25 power tools and appliances in the average wood, metal and home economics shops in public middle and high schools across the U.S. that possess dangerous restart hazards.

== No-volt release ==
The motor controllers for large electric motors normally incorporate a type of circuit breaker known as a no-volt release. If the power fails, the circuit breaker opens and the motor will not restart when the power is restored. The circuit breaker must be reset before the motor can be started again.
