= Women in Tajikistan =

General statistics
- Maternal mortality (per 100,000): 65 (2010)
- Women in parliament: 17.5% (2012)
- Women over 25 with secondary education: 93.2% (2010)
- Women in labour force: 57.4% (2011)

Gender Inequality Index
- Value: 0.285(2021)
- Rank: 68th out of 191

Global Gender Gap Index
- Value: 0.663 (2022)
- Rank: 114th out of 146

This page examines the dynamics surrounding women in Tajikistan.

== Cultural background ==
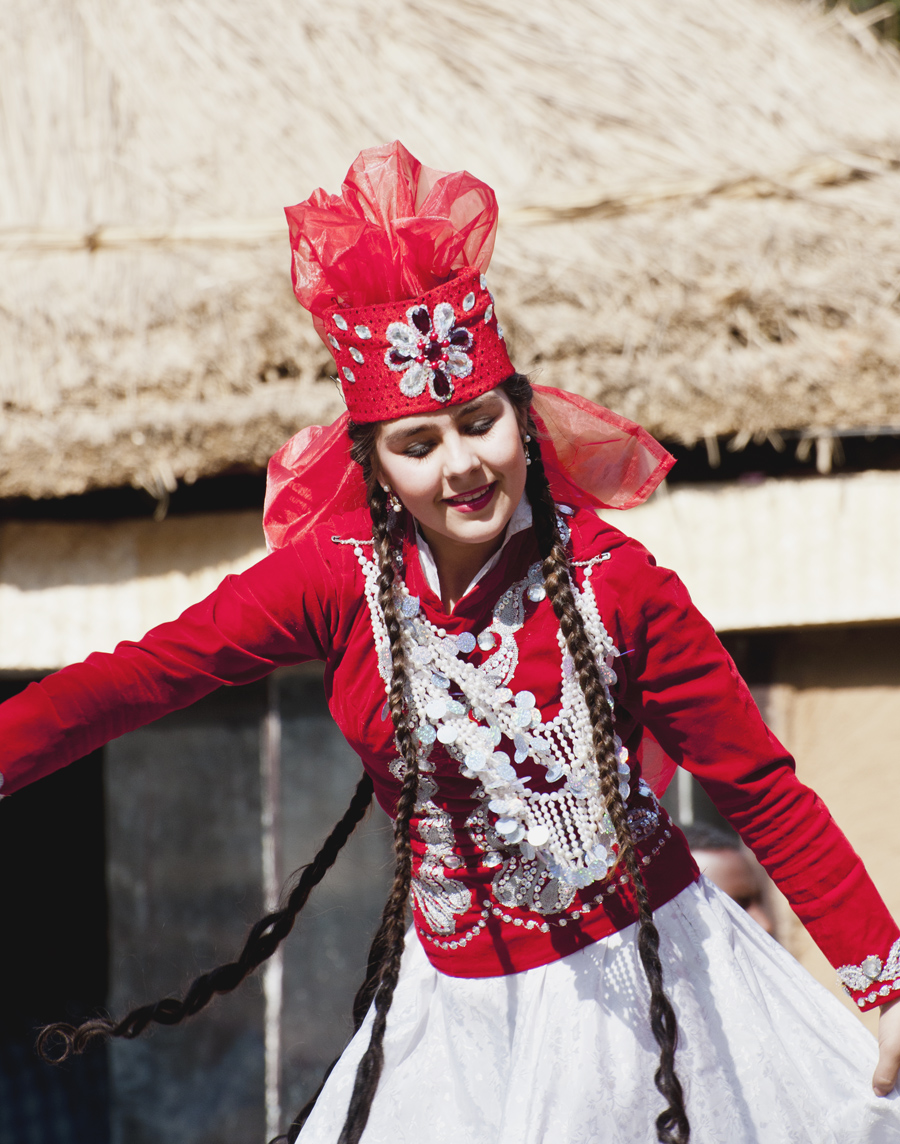
Young woman in Tajikistan performing a traditional folk dance

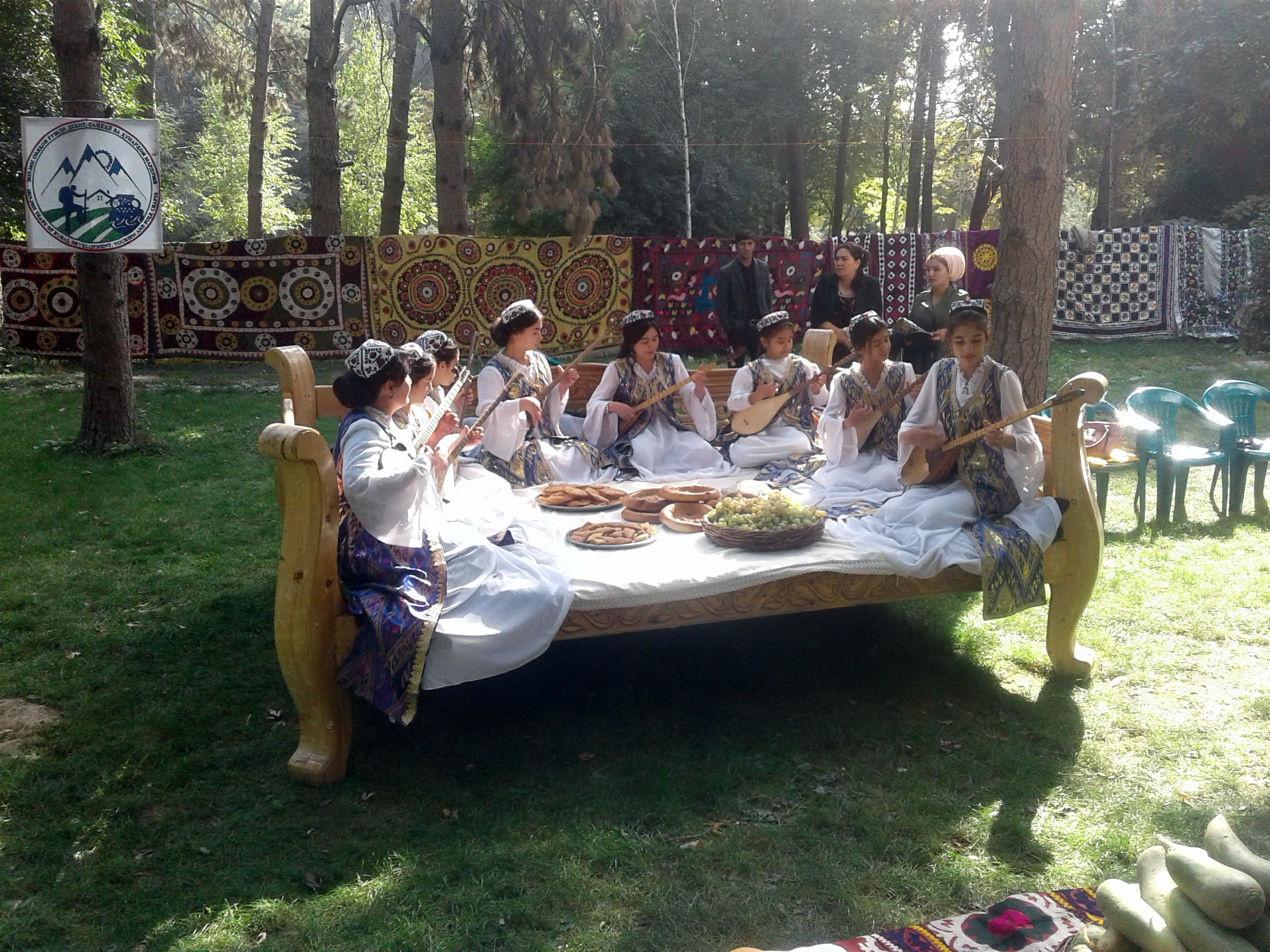
Tajik women playing a traditional guitar

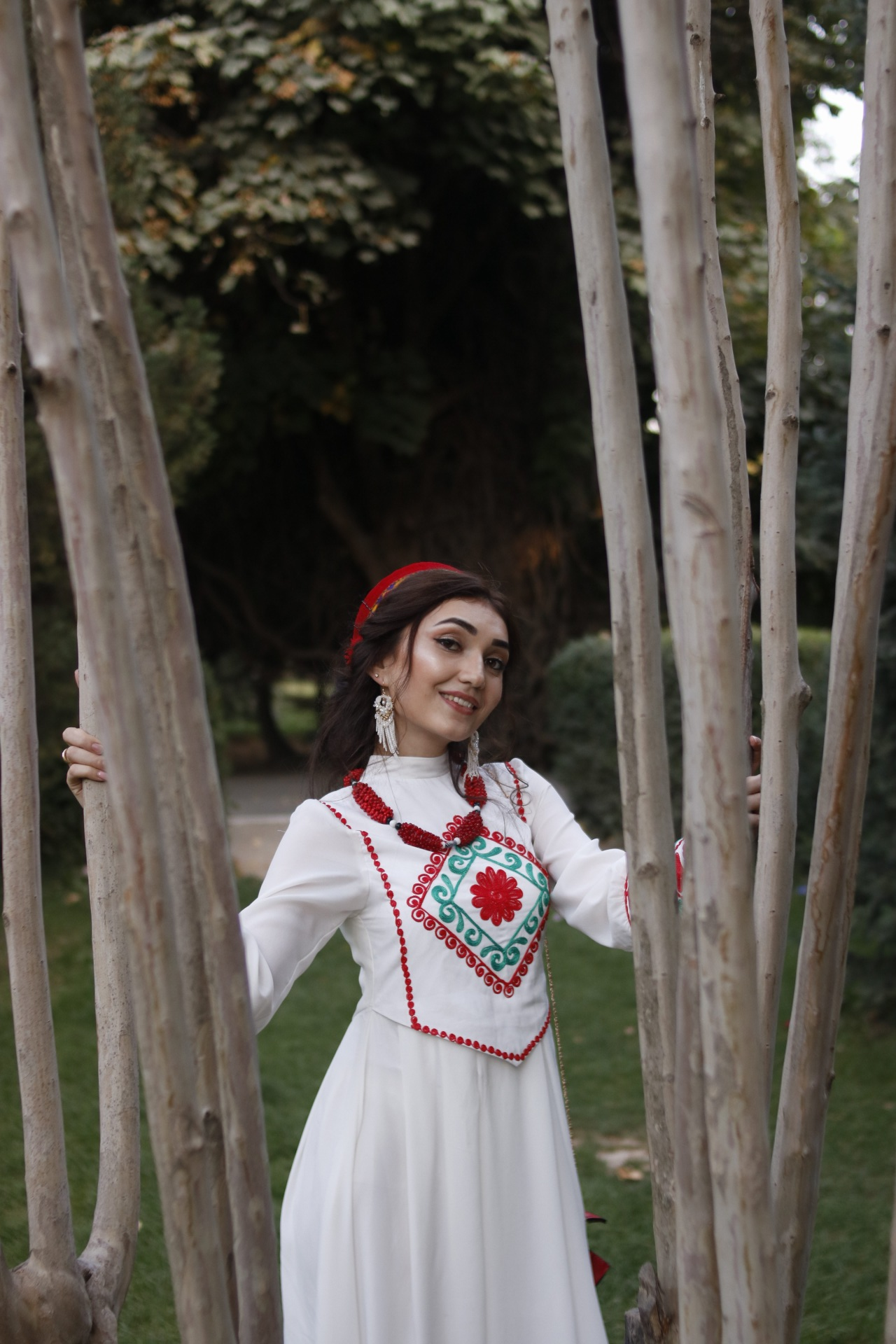
Tajik woman

Tajikistan is a country in Central Asia, with a population formed largely of Tajiks (84.3%), with a significant Uzbek minority of 13.8%, and smaller numbers of Kyrgyz, Russians, Turkmens, Tatars, and Arabs. Tajikistan is one of the poorest states of the former Soviet sphere. It is a largely rural and agricultural country: as of 2015, only 26.8% of the total population lived in urban areas. The country experienced a very turbulent period in the 1990s, after the fall of the Soviet Union, with the 1992-97 civil war severely damaging its already weak economy. About 90% of the population is Muslim, with most of them practicing Sunni Islam.

Women in Tajikistan, although living in a strongly patriarchal society, do have a very high literacy rate at 99.7% (as of 2015). Although the use of modern contraception is low (27.9% as of 2012), the total fertility rate is only 2.71 children born/woman (2015 estimate).

== History ==
The Soviet era saw the implementation of policies designed to transform the status of women in Tajik society. During the 1930s, the Soviet authorities launched a campaign for women's equality in Tajikistan, as they did elsewhere in Central Asia. Eventually major changes resulted from such programs, but initially they provoked intense public opposition. For example, women who appeared in public without the traditional all-enveloping Muslim veil were ostracized by society or even killed by relatives for supposedly shaming their families by what was considered unchaste behavior.

World War II brought an upsurge in women's employment outside the home. With the majority of men removed from their civilian jobs by the demands of war, women compensated for the labor shortage. Although the employment of indigenous women in industry continued to grow even after the war, they remained a small fraction of the industrial labor force after independence.

In the early 1980s, women made up 51 percent of Tajikistan's population and 52 percent of the work force on collective farms, and 38 percent of the industrial labor force, 16 percent of transportation workers, 14 percent of communications workers, and 28 percent of civil servants. These statistics include women of Russian and other non-Central Asian nationalities.

In some rural parts of the republic, about half the women were not employed outside the home in the mid-1980s. In the late Soviet era, female underemployment was an important political issue in Tajikistan because it was linked to the Soviet propaganda campaign portraying Islam as a regressive influence on society.

Some argue that the issue of female employment was more complicated than was indicated by Soviet propaganda. Many women remained in the home not only because of traditional attitudes about women's roles but also because many lacked vocational training and few child care facilities were available. By the end of the 1980s, Tajikistan's preschools accommodated 16.5 percent of the children of appropriate age overall and 2.4 percent of the rural children.

Despite all this, women provided the core of the work force in certain areas of agriculture, especially the production of cotton and some fruits and vegetables. Women were underrepresented in government and management positions relative to their proportion of the republic's population. The Communist Party of Tajikistan, the government - especially the higher offices - and economic management organizations were largely directed by men.

In the last decades of the twentieth century, Tajik social norms and even de facto government policy favored a traditionalist, restrictive attitude toward women that tolerated wife beating and the arbitrary dismissal of women from responsible positions. In the late Soviet period, Tajik girls still commonly married while under-age, despite official condemnation of this practice as a remnant of the feudal Central Asian mentality.

After the violent conflict of the 1990s, which destabilized the country, the 21st century saw a very weak economy, plagued by unemployment and social problems. As a result, large numbers of people, mainly men working in the construction industry or other low-skilled jobs, left abroad in search of work opportunities: by 2009 it was estimated that approximately 800,000 Tajiks were working in Russia. Women remaining at home often experience severe poverty, often resorting to subsistence farming. In 2003, it was estimated that 64% of Tajiks lived below the poverty line.

== Domestic violence ==
Domestic violence in Tajikistan is very high, due to traditional Tajik patriarchal values, as well as a reluctance by the authorities to intervene in what is viewed in Tajikistan as a "private family matter". Nearly half of Tajik women have been subjected to physical, psychological, or sexual violence by their husbands or in-laws.

Domestic violence is often seen as justified by Tajik society: a UNICEF survey found that 62.4% of women in Tajikistan justify wife beating if the wife goes out without telling the husband; 68% if she argues with him; 47.9% if she refuses to have sex with him. Another survey also found that women and men largely agreed that it was justifiable for a husband or mother-in-law to beat a wife/daughter-in-law who had "talked back", disobeyed, left the house without permission, had not prepared dinner on time, or had not cared for the children properly.

In 2013, Tajikistan enacted the Law on the Prevention of Domestic Violence, its first law against domestic violence. NGOs working on women's issues first drafted the proposal in 2007. After no progress was made for three years, Muyasara Bobokhanova, a founder and head of the Association "Woman & Society", sought help from the President, requesting a working group made up of legislators, NGO representatives and other areas of government meet with international organizations to discuss the issue. Specific issues that were western, such as punishment, were removed from the original draft. Focus was directed toward prevention, through addressing the causes, such as unemployment and instability that lead to violence and ensuring that legal and psychological assistance is provided to victims.

== Forced and early marriage ==
Although Tajikistan's laws prohibit forced and child marriage, these practices are common throughout the country, and very little is done to curb these customs. Rates of child marriage increased drastically during the civil war, when parents forced their daughters to marry, in order to protect their premarital chastity (that could be lost through rape, which could affect the 'reputation' of the family). Fear of the girl remaining unmarried is another factor, which also encourages parents to arrange early marriages, since it is not socially acceptable for a woman to not have a husband.

== Reproductive rights ==
The Government of Tajikistan in August, 2019 announced the renewal of its reproductive health programme for a four-year period ending in 2027 afterwards Nairobi Summit made a commitment. The programme of US$4.1 million is aimed at enhancing the accessibility, quality, and efficiency of reproductive health and family planning services focusing on the most vulnerable citizens who constitute over 75 percent of the population and mostly live in rural areas.

== Women in local government ==
Women's involvement in local government is considered relatively low. In rural jamoats only 15.2% of elected deputies are women. The Gorno-Badakhshan Autonomous Region in the east of the country had the highest share of elected female deputies in rural jamoats at approximately 21.2%.

== Women in security ==
The OSCE Border Management Staff College was established in Dushanbe in 2009 with the aim to provide quality training for border security professionals from various government agencies. The emphasis of this program was to improve border security on the Afghan-Tajik border in the south of the country. At first the college attracted predominately male participants; the OSCE reported that from 2009 to 2013 approximately 90% of participants were men. The college then implemented special training programs for women to encourage gender equality and career opportunities for women in border security. A study by the International Organization for Migration found that female border guards were considered much better than their male counterparts in detecting human trafficking cases, de-escalating conflict situations and identifying fraudulent documents. The Tajik Border Forces has since been working to attract more women to the agency. So far, the college has completed six leadership training courses specifically for women in their work to promote gender equality and empowerment for women in border security and management.
