= Parental abuse by children =

Type of domestic violence

Child-to-parent violence (CPV), also recognized as abuse of parents by their children, constitutes a manifestation of domestic violence characterized by the infliction of maltreatment upon parents. CPV can manifest in diverse forms, encompassing physical, verbal, psychological, emotional, and financial dimensions. The repercussions of enduring abuse from one's offspring can be substantial, exerting influence on the physical and mental well-being of parents, both in the immediate and prolonged periods.

== Multiple causes of abusive behavior ==
Many people consider parental abuse to be the result of certain parenting practices, neglect, or the child suffering abuse themselves, but other adolescent abusers have had "normal" upbringings and have not suffered from such situations. Children may be subjected to violence on TV, in movies and in music, and that violence may come to be considered "normal". The breakdown of the family unit, poor or nonexistent relationships with an absent parent, as well as debt, unemployment, and parental drug/alcohol abuse may all be contributing factors to abuse. Some other reasons for CPV according to several experts include:

- Aggressive behavioral tendencies
- Frustration or inability to deal with problems
- Unable or unwilling to learn how to manage behavior
- Witnessing other abuses at home
- Lack of respect for a parent because of perceived weakness
- Lack of consequences for bad behavior
- Being abused themselves
- Gang culture
- Not being able to properly care for a disabled or mentally ill parent(s)
- Revenge or punishment
- Mental illness
- Corporal punishment

== History ==
Parental abuse is a relatively new term. In 1979, Harbin and Madden released a study using the term "parent battery," but juvenile delinquency, which is a major factor, has been studied since the late 19th century. Even though some studies have been done in the United States, Australia, Canada, and other countries, the lack of reporting of adolescent abuse towards parents makes it difficult to accurately determine the extent of it. Many studies have to rely on self-reporting by adolescents. In 2004, Robinson, of Brigham Young University, published: Parent Abuse on the Rise: A Historical Review in the American Association of Behavioral Social Science Online Journal, reporting the results of the 1988 study performed by Evans and Warren-Sohlberg. The results reported that 57% of parental abuse was physical; using a weapon was at 17%; throwing items was at 5% and verbal abuse was at 22%. With 82% of the abuse being against mothers (five times greater than against fathers), and 11% of the abusers were under the age of 10 years. The highest rate of abuse happens within families with a single mother. Mothers are usually the primary caregivers; they spend more time with their children than fathers and have closer emotional connections to them. It can also be due to the size and strength of the abuser. Parental abuse can occur in any family and it is not necessarily associated with ethnic background, socio-economic class, or sexual orientation.

Numerous studies concluded that gender does not play a role in the total number of perpetrators; however, males are more likely to inflict physical abuse and females are more likely to inflict emotional abuse. Studies from the United States estimate that violence among adolescents peaks at 15–17 years old. However, a Canadian study done by Barbara Cottrell in 2001 suggests the ages are 12–14 years old.

Parental abuse does not happen just inside the home but can in public places, further adding to the humiliation of the parents. Abuse is not only a domestic affair but can be criminal as well. Most teenagers experience a transition in which they try to go from being dependent to independent, but there are some dynamics of parental control that may alter it. There will always be times of resistance toward parental authority. According to the Canadian National Clearinghouse on Family Violence, the abuse generally begins with verbal abuse, but even then, some females can be very physically abusive towards a child who is smaller and more vulnerable than they are, and to cover their abuse, they often lie to the other parent about actual events that led to "severe punishment." The child, adolescent or parent may show no remorse or guilt and feel justified in the behavior, but many times when the child is the one who is being abused, they are very remorseful for being forced to defend themselves, especially when they are not the aggressor. Parents can examine the behavior of their children to determine whether or not it is abusive. Some teenagers can become aggressive as a result of parental abuse, dysfunction, or psychological problems, while some children may have trouble dealing with their emotions. However, children who are abused are not always afforded protection from their abusive parents.

== Intervention ==
Non-violent resistance (NVR) is an approach designed to overcome a child’s aggressive, controlling, and self-destructive behaviors. In NVR, parents replace talking with action, not engaging with aggressive or harmful behaviors. With the support of therapists and other counselors, it is possible to identify mental health and other behavioral concerns throughout this process. It has four areas where parents are supported by therapists or other counselors:

1. De-escalation
2. Breaking taboos
3. Taking non-violent actions
4. Reconciliation gestures

While intervention is an option, it may not always work. There are times when the child has a mental illness that does not allow them, adolescent or teenager, to understand what exactly is happening. Therefore, they act out their emotions the only way they know. This can present itself as violence, emotional abuse, destructive behavior, such as destroying personal property or self-harm. The United States currently protects abused children using Courts, Child Protective Services and other agencies. The US also has Adult Protective Services which is provided to abused, neglected, or exploited older adults and adults with significant disabilities. There are no agencies or programs that protect parents from abusive children, adolescents or teenagers other than giving up their parental rights to the state they live in.

Lastly, the quality of family relationships directly influences child-to-parent violence, with power-assertive discipline playing a mediating role in this connection. It appears that the emotional aspect and overall quality of family relationships are pivotal factors in preventing violent behaviors.

== See also ==
- Child abuse
- Dysfunctional family
- Elder abuse
- Juvenile delinquency
- Parental alienation
- Runaway (dependent)
- Sibling abuse
- Teenage rebellion
