= Women in Panama =

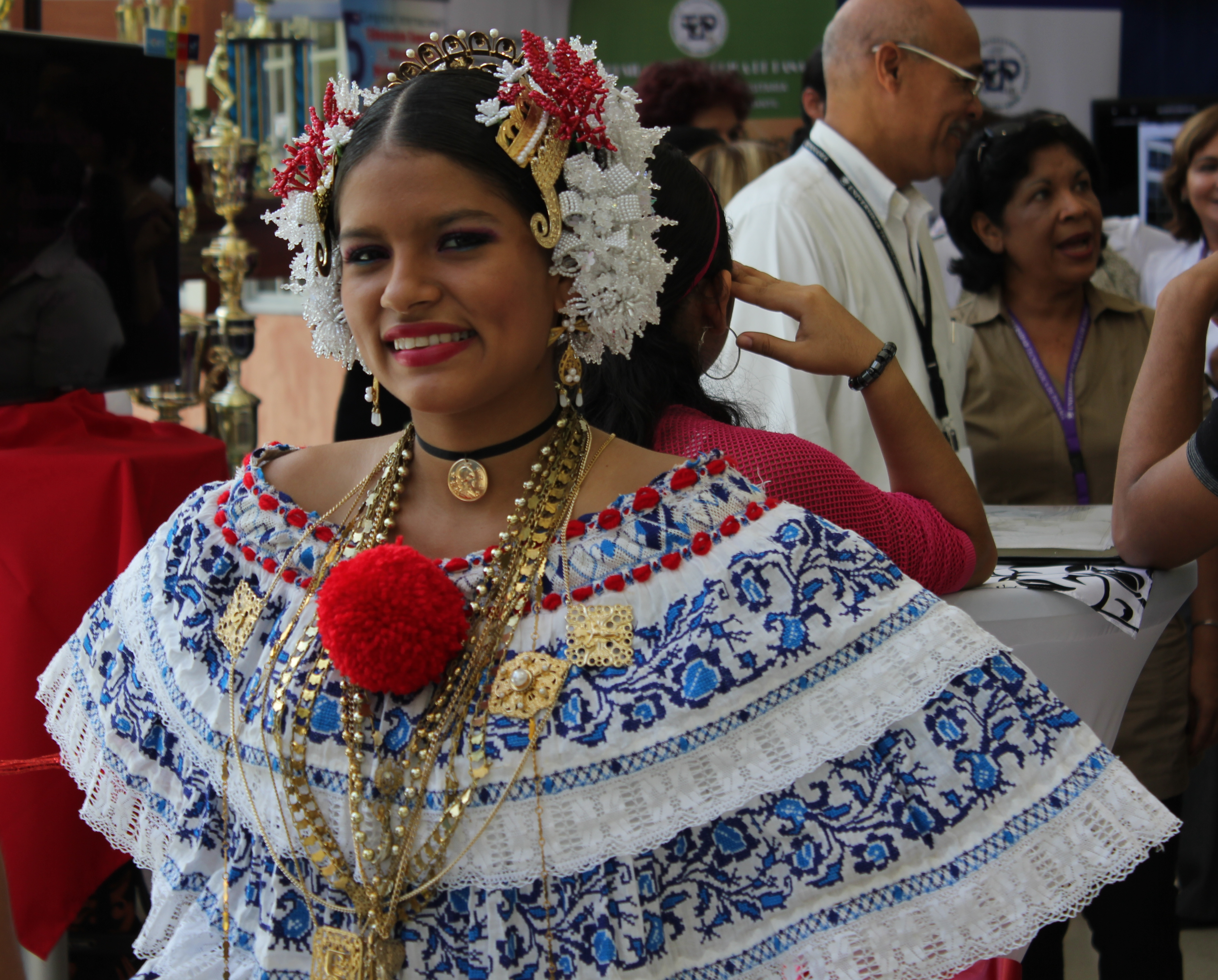
- A Panamanian woman wearing traditional clothing

General statistics
- Maternal mortality (per 100,000): 92 (2010)
- Women in parliament: 19.3% (2014)
- Women over 25 with secondary education: 63.5% (2012)
- Women in labour force: 49.0% (2012)

Gender Inequality Index
- Value: 0.392 (2021)
- Rank: 96th out of 191

Global Gender Gap Index
- Value: 0.743 (2022)
- Rank: 40th out of 146

Women in Panama are the women who live in or are from Panama. Panamanian women, by tradition, are Hispanic and they are treated as equal to men, accorded with "deference and respect".

== Panamanian culture ==
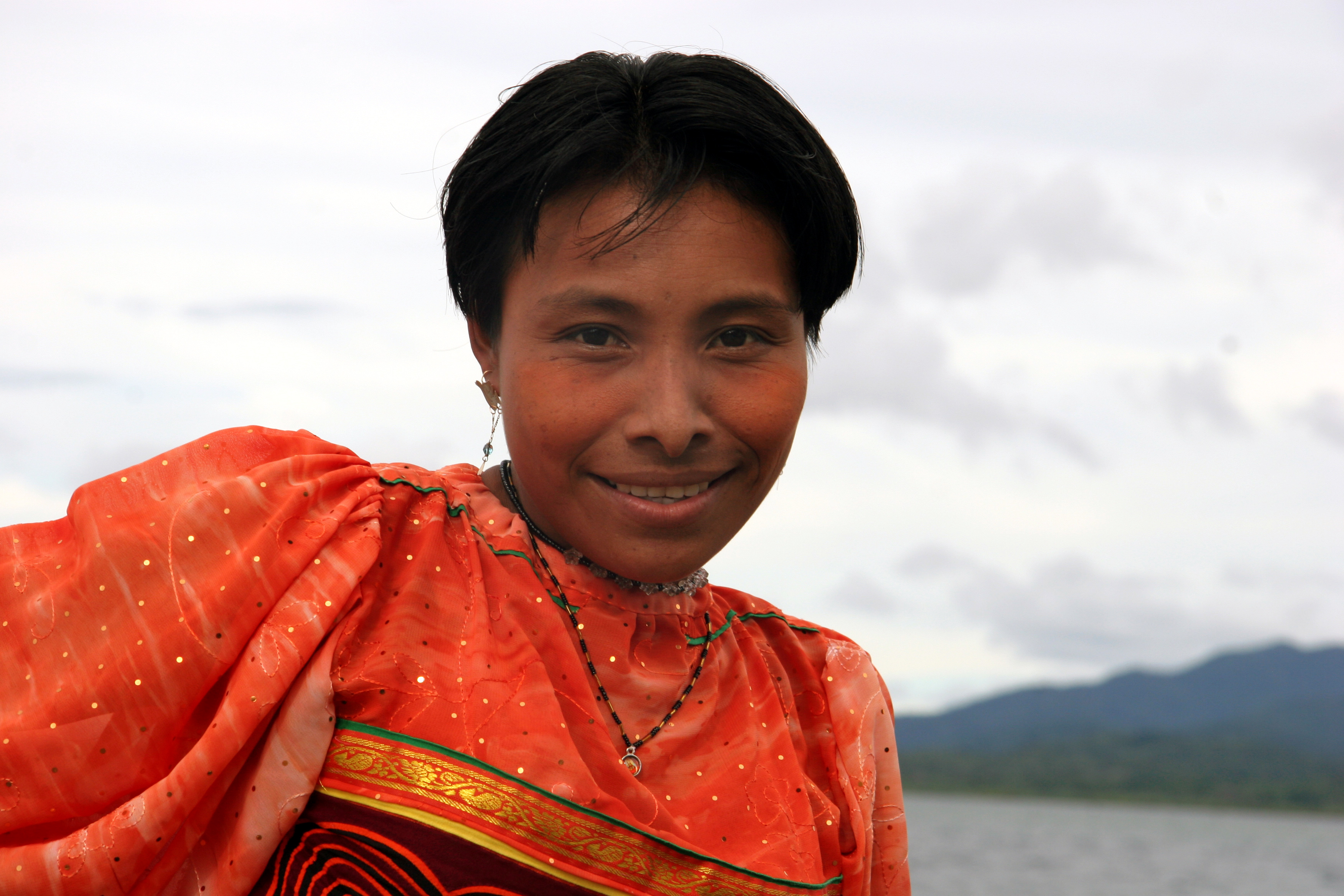
A Panamanian Guna woman wearing a traditional costume.

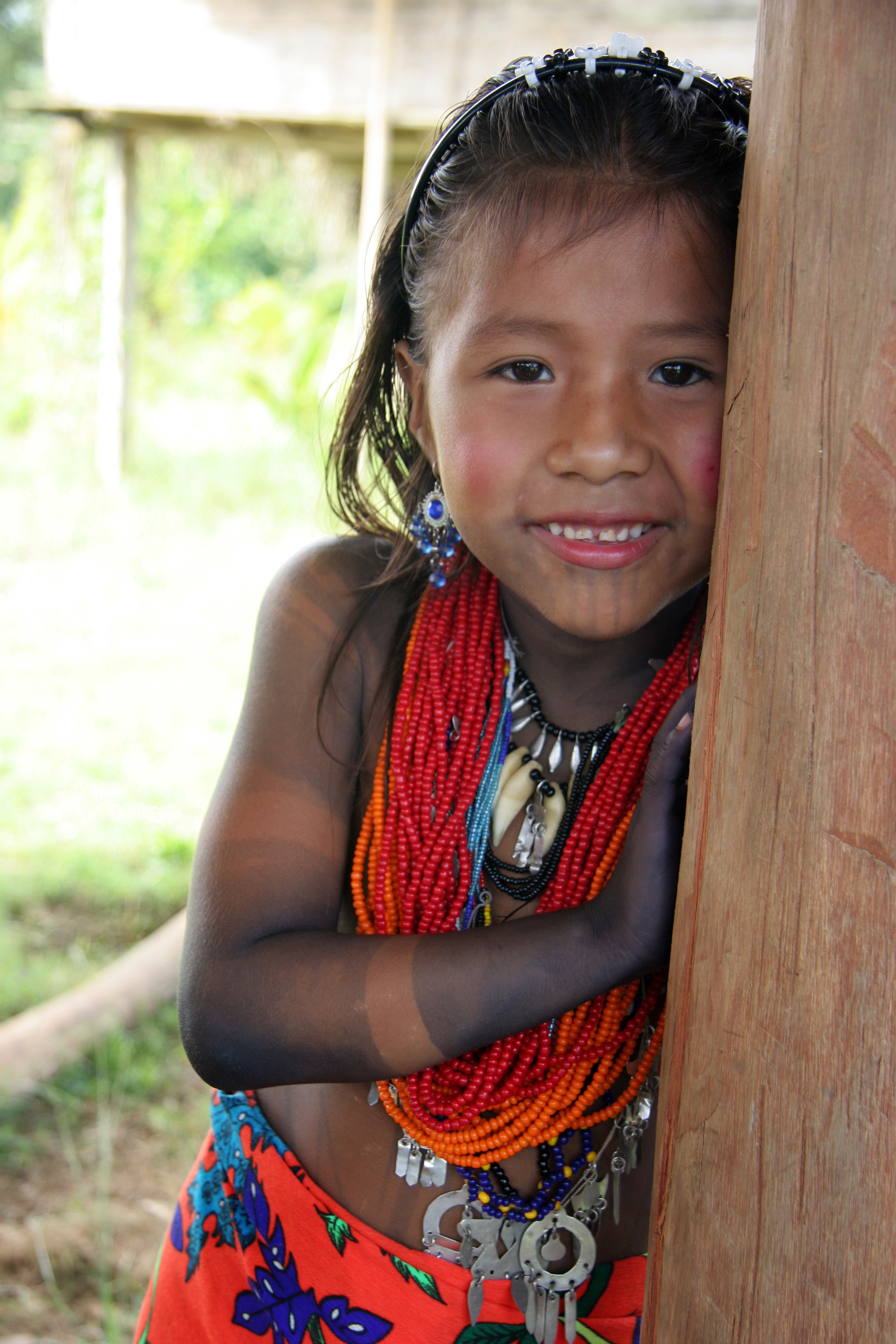
Embera girl dressed for dancing, Panama

Young women in Panama, particularly those who are single, are regarded as persons with "very high symbolic status", including giving them roles as Carnaval Queens. One particular example of such reverence of female adolescents is the celebration of the inna suid by the Guna people, which is a three-day celebration of the adolescent girls' coming of age.

Some Panamanian women occupy high positions in a range of professions, including education and government service. Panama had a female president as their national leader, in the person of Mireya Moscoso, who was Panama's first female president, serving from 1999 to 2004.

The literacy rate (as of 2015) is estimated at 94.4% for females and 95.7% for males (aged 15 and over).

== Family life ==
As in other Latin American countries, cohabitation is today very common in Panama, and most children are born to unmarried women: in the 2000s, 58.5% of the children were born to cohabiting mothers, 24.4% to married mothers, and 17.1% to single mothers (not living with a partner). But unlike other countries in the region, births outside of marriage have been the majority for decades: in the 1970s, only 30.4% of children were born inside of marriage. The total fertility rate (TFR) is 2.38/children born per woman (as of 2014).

== Domestic violence ==
Domestic violence is a problem in the country. Panama enacted Ley No.38 del 2001 against domestic violence. In 2013, the country enacted Law 82 - Typifying Femicide and Violence Against Women (Ley 82 - Tipifica el Femicidio y la Violencia contra las Mujeres) a comprehensive law against violence against women.

== See also ==
- Demographics of Panama
- Miss Panama
- Human trafficking in Panama
