= Domestic violence in Panama =

Domestic violence in Panama is a serious problem and remains underreported. Domestic violence, including spousal rape, psychological, physical, and economic abuse are criminalized. Panama enacted Ley No.38 del 2001 against domestic violence. In 2013, the country enacted Law 82 - Typifying Femicide and Violence Against Women (Ley 82 - Tipifica el Femicidio y la Violencia contra las Mujeres) a comprehensive law against violence against women.

The Integrated National System for Criminal Statistics (SIEC) reported 1,283 cases of domestic violence from January through June 2013. Statistics for January through September from the Panamanian Observatory Against Gender-Based Violence showed that of the 47 women who died violently, 30 died as a result of domestic violence.

== See also ==
- Crime in Panama
- Women in Panama
