= Nicola Graham-Kevan =

Clinical psychologist researching violent behavior

- Education: University of Central Lancashire
- Occupations: Psychologist and professor
- Known for: Aggression, Domestic violence, Forensic psychology
- Children: Kayleigh, Jay, Eve, Elle
- Scientific career
- Fields: Psychology
- Workplaces: University of Central Lancashire, Mid Sweden University
- Thesis: Physical aggression and controlling behaviours within relationships (2004)
- Doctoral advisors: John Archer

Nicola Graham-Kevan is a psychologist and professor of criminal justice psychology at the University of Central Lancashire in Preston, England. She is also a professor of clinical psychology at the Mid Sweden University in Östersund, Sweden. She conducts research on aggression, domestic violence, stalking, victimisation, psychological trauma and post-traumatic growth. Professor Graham-Kevan is the Director of TRAC Psychological Limited (tracpsychological.co.uk) where she develops and delivers behaviour change programmes, training and evaluations. She also works clinically designing interventions for offenders with emotional management or aggression management problems.

== Education ==
Graham-Kevan obtained a bachelor of science degree in psychology with law in 1997, a Ph.D. in the psychology of violence in 2004 and a master's degree in forensic psychology in 2006, all at the University of Central Lancashire. Under the guidance of John Archer, she wrote her doctoral thesis on physical aggression and controlling behaviours within relationships.

== Domestic violence research ==
Graham-Kevan conducts research on domestic violence. She has studied in the relationship between coercive control and domestic violence being the first to test Johnson's coercive control typology empirically, the effectiveness of perpetrator treatment programmes, protective factors in victim recovery, male victims of domestic violence and the impact of traumatic exposure during employment within emergency services.

=== Perpetrator treatment ===
Graham-Kevan has studied treatment programmes for perpetrators of domestic violence. With co-authors, she has found that in order to effectively intervene, it is necessary to know the function that the violence serves for the perpetrator, whether it is for example used to bully a partner into acceding to wishes, to resolve conflict, to manage fear of abandonment or to manage difficult emotions. Perpetrator treatment programmes that she has developed are used in prisons for example Inner Strength for male domestic violence inmates and in community settings for both men and women.

== Media attention ==
Graham-Kevan has been interviewed and quoted by both national and international media regarding aggression and domestic violence, including The Independent, El Mundo, the International Business Times, and Marie Claire.

== Selected publications ==
=== Peer-reviewed articles ===
- Graham-Kevan N, Archer J. Intimate terrorism and common couple violence: A test of Johnson's predictions in four British samples. Journal of interpersonal violence. 2003 Nov;18(11):1247-70.
- Archer J, Graham‐Kevan N. Do beliefs about aggression predict physical aggression to partners? Aggressive Behavior: Official Journal of the International Society for Research on Aggression. 2003 Jan;29(1):41-54.
- Graham-Kevan N, Archer J. Investigating three explanations of women's relationship aggression. Psychology of Women Quarterly. 2005 Sep;29(3):270-7.
- Graham-Kevan N, Archer J. Does controlling behavior predict physical aggression and violence to partners? Journal of Family Violence. 2008 Oct 1;23(7):539.
- Dixon L, Graham-Kevan N. Understanding the nature and etiology of intimate partner violence and implications for practice and policy. Clinical Psychology Review. 2011 Nov 1;31(7):1145-55.
- Dixon L, Archer J, Graham‐Kevan N. Perpetrator programmes for partner violence: Are they based on ideology or evidence?. Legal and Criminological Psychology. 2012, 17:196-215.
- Bates EA, Graham‐Kevan N, Archer J. Testing predictions from the male control theory of men's partner violence. Aggressive behavior. 2014 Jan;40(1):42-55.
- Graham-Kevan N, Brooks M, Willan VJ, Lowe M, Robinson P, Khan R, Stokes R, Irving M, Karwacka M, Bryce J. Repeat victimisation, retraumatisation and victim vulnerability. The Open Criminology Journal. 2015 May 8;8:36-48.
- Machado A, Santos A, Graham-Kevan N, Matos M. Exploring help seeking experiences of male victims of female perpetrators of IPV. Journal of family violence. 2017 Jul 1;32(5):513-23.

=== Popular press ===
- Graham-Kevan N, The invisible domestic violence – against men, The Guardian, June 7, 2011.
- Fogg A, ..., Graham-Kevan N, et al., Anorexia and rape are men’s problems too, The Guardian, July 2, 2015.
