= Non Violent Resistance (psychological intervention) =

Non Violent Resistance (NVR) is a psychological approach for overcoming destructive, aggressive, controlling and risk-taking behaviour. It was originally developed to address serious behaviour problems in young people, although it is now also being utilised in many different areas, such as adult entitled dependence, anxiety-related problems, problems linked to paediatric illness, internet dependency and misuse, and domestic violence perpetrated by adults.

Empirical research is on-going and relatively new. However, the outcome studies carried out so far has shown it to be effective for reducing childhood violence and aggression, improved relationships within the family, as well as increasing parents’ confidence levels and improving parental mental health.

NVR's principles are based on the socio-political practice of nonviolent resistance (or nonviolent action), which refers to achieving goals through nonviolent methods, such as symbolic protests, civil disobedience, and economic or political noncooperation. The modern leading father of nonviolent resistance as a form of political struggle is Mahatma Gandhi, the Indian leader who used peaceful protests to seek independence from the British. NVR draws upon the approaches used by Gandhi to develop interventions aimed at the violent or self-destructive behaviour of young people who act in controlling ways. More recently, the practice of NVR has spawned the concept of the “anchoring function of attachment”, a contribution to attachment theory which emphasises the child's need to become secure in the relationship with a ‘strong and wise adult’, as well as the conceptualisation of the “New Authority”, which is based on principles such as transparency, inter-personal closeness, accountability of the adult within the community, rather than the principles of positional power, hierarchy and distance which marked more traditional forms of authority.

== Description ==
As a therapeutic or coaching process, NVR involves the individual's family, and generally extends to include family friends, professionals, schools and members of the community in its network. The approach believes parents, carers or teachers overcome their isolation by adopting such a large support network, and drawing on interpersonal support. A course of NVR lasts for about 3 months, or longer in more serious cases. Parents or carers of the aggressive young person typically attend one session with an NVR practitioner weekly, and may receive additional support such as telephone calls 1-2 times a week initially, gradually reducing as the intervention progresses. The violent child does not have to participate; NVR has been designed specifically to help families in which a young person does not cooperate in the therapeutic process. It is thought that the parents’ perseverance in the face of the child's non-cooperation sends a message of resistance.

The purposes of NVR is to help adults develop a positive form of authority, develop effective, non-punitive strategies of addressing the young person's controlling behaviour without escalation, restore a sense of balance in the family, and improve family relationships. NVR is a stable alternative to violent conflict and unproductive attempts at verbal persuasion.

The intervention is used for a variety of aggressive people, including children, adolescents and adults. It is currently used with children in care, children with mental health issues, and people with autistic spectrum disorder (ASD). The methods are concrete, specific, and are not overly reliant on the spoken word, which is why the approach is offered to families of people with ASD. The techniques can also be easily adapted into story boards and other methods, which may help the child understand what changes are being made to resist their behaviour.

=== The Principles and Aims of NVR ===
The intervention is based on a number of principles and assumptions. Most young people who act in defiant, aggressive or violent ways do this to control others around them. A key element of NVR is an understanding of the concept of ‘parental (or adult) presence.’ This refers to an awareness of the person of the parent and their authority at home, in school, and when the child is with their peers. It also includes parents not being pushed aside, and regaining their parental space in the family unit. Practitioners find that parents of violent children often feel helpless and isolated, and claim this is largely due to a lowered parental presence. NVR aims to increase the parents’ presence in their child's mind, and to reduce the parent's helplessness. One necessary measure in achieving this is the development of an adult support network. This is an essential element in this therapeutic process, where supporters in the network play vital roles, such as mentor, mediator, witness and protector. Some of the other methods for raising parental presence are briefly mentioned in the next section.

Another important principle in NVR is that of a delayed reaction: this refers to ‘striking when the iron is cold,’ or not reacting immediately to a situation, which avoids escalation. Instead, the issue is dealt with later at the resistor's choosing. This gives back power to the parent, and helps them regain parental authority and presence. Finally, the therapy works on the premise of using action, not words. This is particularly useful when NVR is applied to people with ASD, who struggle with social communication.

The approach endeavours to help parents gain authority. This is achieved through supporting parents to become active in five main areas:

==== De-escalation ====
De-escalation refers to refusing to be drawn into a battle with the other (escalation). Escalation can be symmetrical where parent and child each attempt to gain control over the other and raise levels of aggression in an upward spiral, or complementary, where parents give in to child demands or the threat of violence or other controlling responses and acquiesce to the child. In each case, the parents are believed to lose more of their authority, and family members are weakened and left more vulnerable. By developing strategies to manage risk with an NVR practitioner, the aim is that parents can build up their authority without getting involved in fruitless power struggles.

==== Breaking taboos ====
The parents seen in NVR therapy often attempt to “keep the peace” by following rules explicitly or implicitly set in place by their child. It is important to break the rules, in order to resist the violence. Parents therefore learn to break the rules that their child has set up; this ‘parental disobedience,’ is a key principle of the approach.

==== Taking non-violent action ====
NVR does not rely mainly on punishments or consequences for reducing unacceptable behaviours, but instead on increasing the parents ability to become present and resist aggressive or self-risk behaviours.

==== Reconciliation gestures ====
Reconciliation gestures play an important role in the therapy process. The purpose of the gestures is to show the young person that their families care for and love them. The gestures are also thought to help the individual and their parents relate to one another beyond the aggression, and reestablish a loving connection.

==== Child focus ====
It is believed within the NVR field that when young people have experienced physical or sexual child abuse or neglect, their aggressive or dismissive behaviour can mask vulnerability, such as anxiety or fear, and/or an unmet need. Some areas of unmet needs are said to be:

- The need to feel safe and protected
- The need to feel a sense of belonging
- The need to have a coherent and benign self- and family narrative
- The need for support in one's development.

The child's behavioural problems divert the attention of adult and child away from any unmet need and vulnerability. NVR claims that by raising their own sense of agency and strength in resisting the destructive behaviour, and then using their efforts at reconciliation to address the child's unmet needs, the adults can re-sensitise themselves for the child's distress and re-instate themselves in a caring position.

=== The Techniques NVR uses ===
NVR uses a variety of methods, many of which are outlined in the NVR parents’ manual. The resistance process is developed step by step with the NVR practitioner, in order to increase the parents’, carers’ or teachers’ confidence. Initially, the intervention begins with a written announcement; the therapist or NVR coach/practitioner supports and guides the parents and/or other adults in writing and planning how to carry out the announcement without escalation or engaging in unproductive communication.

A support network is developed by the parents with the aid of a NVR practitioner throughout the process. The aim of this is to help them to remove the secrecy and expose the violence, and help them to feel supported in their actions. The support network also plays a role in carrying out action, such as participating in ‘sit ins,’ where parents and supporters sit in with the child after an aggressive incident and express their expectation that the child will develop a solution to the violence. Parents are encouraged to document acts of violence or self-destructive acts, as well as their own behaviour and responses around these, and to pass this information on to their supporters, in order to enable public accountability for their own and the young person's behaviour.

The supporters also play a role in a ‘campaign of concern’ or ‘message campaign,’ by contacting the young person and expressing their concern for them and others affected by their aggression. This is done to reinforce the parents’ or carers’ message of resistance.

After any demonstration of resistance to the child's aggression, adults use reconciliation gestures to communicate their unconditional care, respect and love for the young person.

Further techniques are the telephone round and tailing, which are used as methods for raising adult presence where young people withdraw from their families into dangerous environments. Parents and other adults use these and other methods, draw upon their inter-personal resources, to effectively resist their child's violence and self-destructive behaviour by raising parental (adult) presence.

== Applications ==
NVR can be utilised with a range of difficulties such as anxiety and aggression in young people on the autistic spectrum, Obsessive Compulsive Disorder (OCD) and other severe anxiety-related problems, when the child does not collaborate in treatment. NVR is now being used for self-isolation, adult entitled dependency, and a variety of other problem areas.

Recently NVR has been developed as an intervention in a variety of different settings, such as residential care and foster care (Jakob and van Holen, in process). It is also being developed for other problematic areas, such as childhood obesity and chronic paediatric illness.

== History ==
NVR is a relatively new intervention amongst other psychological interventions. It was developed by Haim Omer and colleagues at the University of Tel Aviv, to support parents/carers in developing effective resistance against violence.

NVR is widely used in Israel, Germany and a number of other European countries. In the English – speaking world, it has been mainly introduced to the UK.

=== Family therapy roots ===
Reviews indicate that systemic and multi-modal approaches are effective in decreasing destructive behaviour in adolescents with behavioural problems. The NVR approach applies traditions of Systemic (Family) Therapy, involving family members and institutions surrounding the individual in the therapy process, and change is brought about through the interactions between them.

=== Other roots ===
NVR has its roots in the philosophy and methods of socio-political nonviolent resistance, such as those used by Mahatma Gandhi and Martin Luther King Jr. Gandhi practised and advocated non-violence when leading protests against those seeking to oppress him and his fellow men and women. He famously spoke out about non-violently fighting the British without arms, through being peaceful and non-retaliatory. The principle of non-violently resisting a child's controlling behaviour derives from the same ideas and beliefs. Gandhi also promoted solidarity, which is one of the aims the supporters’ network strives to evoke in the parents.

Finally, the stance of de-escalation and refusal to be drawn into conflict can be summed up by a famous quote from Gandhi: “An eye for an eye makes the whole world blind”. It is these non-violent beliefs that provided the foundation for NVR.

== Evaluation of Effectiveness ==
NVR has an emerging evidence base. A recent study showed that NVR was highly effective at improving the problematic behaviour of a large percentage of young people, with no differences between children and adolescents. It was further found that NVR reduced parents’ feelings of helplessness, increased their confidence, and it also improved parental mental health. Parental escalation also decreased within the first four months of the intervention. There was also a very low drop-out rate: over 90% of all families completed the programme.

A study conducted in Germany compared NVR against TEEN Triple-P (a parenting programme for parents of teenagers) and a waiting list group. It was found that the TEEN triple-P and NVR groups showed significant improvements in parenting behaviour, parental presence, reduced parental depression and helplessness. NVR was superior to TEEN Triple-P in showing significant improvements in the 11- to 18-year-old children's externalising behaviour problems, assessed by Achenbach's, Child Behaviour Checklist (CBCL).

Finally, research has shown an improvement in reduced parental submission, fewer power struggles and improvements in children's behaviour.

Presently, there is a Randomized controlled trial (RCT) of NVR for looked after children being conducted in Belgium (Opvang).

== See also ==
- Nonviolent Resistance
- Mahatma Gandhi
- Martin Luther King Jr.
- Family Therapy
