= Emily M. Douglas =

American psychologist

- Education: PhD
- Alma mater: Clark University, University of Massachusetts, Boston
- Known for: Domestic violence, Filicide, Public policy, Political Science, Social Work
- Scientific career
- Workplaces: Montclair State University
- Thesis: The Influence of Public Policy on Human Behavior: Is there an Effect of a New Hampshire Law Stating a Presumption for Joint Legal Custody on Father Involvement in Divorced Families? (2002)

Emily M. Douglas is a political scientist conducting research on child well-being, the child welfare system, fatal child maltreatment, domestic violence, divorced families, and corporal punishment. She is a full professor and the chair of the Department of Social Work and Child Advocacy at Montclair State University.

== Education ==
Douglas studied at the University of Southern Maine and the Cleveland Institute of Music before graduating in 1995 with B.A. degree in psychology from Clark University in Worcester, Massachusetts. In 2002 she obtained her PhD in public policy from University of Massachusetts, Boston, with a dissertation on The Influence of Public Policy on Human Behavior: Is there an Effect of a New Hampshire Law Stating a Presumption for Joint Legal Custody on Father Involvement in Divorced Families?. After graduate school, she did a post-doc with Murray A. Straus at the Family Research Laboratory at the University of New Hampshire.

== Domestic violence research ==
=== Fatal child maltreatment ===
Douglas has done extensive studies on child abuse leading to death and she has developed recommendation for social workers to better identify children at risk. Douglas has also studied the difficulty of distinguishing fatal child maltreatment from sudden infant death syndrome.

=== Corporal punishment ===
In an international research investigation that used an ecological study design, Douglas compared the rate of dating violence among university students in different countries and its relationship to receiving corporal punishment. She found that the rate of dating violence and injury was higher in the universities where more students had experienced corporal punishment as a child.

=== Male victims ===
Together with Denise Hines, Douglas has published a series of papers on male victims of domestic violence, including its prevalence and severity, and men's post-violence helpseeking behavior and experiences.

=== Methods ===
With Murray A. Straus, Douglas has developed a widely used short form questionnaire to evaluate intimate partner violence. To be used in time limited situation, it is based on the longer Conflict Tactics Scales (CTS2), the most commonly used survey instrument for domestic violence.

== Selected publications ==
=== Books ===
- Douglas EM. Mending broken families: Social policies for divorced families:Are they working? Lanham, MD: Rowman & Littlefield Publishers, 2006.
- Douglas EM (editor). Innovations in Child & Family Policy: Multidisciplinary Research and Perspectives on Strengthening Children and Their Families. Lanham, MD: Lexington Books, 2010.
- Straus MA, Douglas EM, Medeiros RA. The primordial violence: Corporal punishment by parents, cognitive development, and crime. New York: Routledge/Taylor & Francis, 2013.
- Douglas EM. Child maltreatment fatalities in the United States: Four decades of policy, program, and professional responses. Springer, 2016.

=== Scientific articles ===
- Straus MA, Douglas EM. A short form of the Revised Conflict Tactics Scales, and typologies for severity and mutuality. Violence and victims. 2004;19(5):507-20.
- Douglas EM. Familial violence socialization in childhood and later life approval of corporal punishment: A cross–cultural perspective. American Journal of Orthopsychiatry. 2006 Jan;76(1):23–30.
- Hines DA, Douglas EM. Women's use of intimate partner violence against men: Prevalence, implications, and consequences. Journal of Aggression, Maltreatment & Trauma. 2009 Aug 19;18(6):572-86.
- Hines DA, Douglas EM. A closer look at men who sustain intimate terrorism by women. Partner Abuse. 2010 Jan 1;1(3):286.
- Hines D, Douglas E. Intimate terrorism by women towards men: does it exist?. Journal of aggression, conflict and peace research. 2010 Jul 6;2(3):36–56.
- Douglas EM, Hines DA. The helpseeking experiences of men who sustain intimate partner violence: An overlooked population and implications for practice. Journal of family violence. 2011 Aug 1;26(6):473-85.
- Douglas EM, Mohn BL. Fatal and non-fatal child maltreatment in the US: An analysis of child, caregiver, and service utilization with the National Child Abuse and Neglect Data Set. Child Abuse & Neglect, 38:42–51, 2014.
- Hines DA, Douglas EM. Sexual aggression experiences among male victims of physical partner violence: Prevalence, severity, and health correlates for male victims and their children. Archives of sexual behavior, 45:1133–1151, 2016.
- Douglas EM, Gushwa MK. An Exploratory Analysis of Seven Child Welfare Workers who Confused SIDS with Child Maltreatment Fatalities: A Brief Research Report. Journal of Social Service Research, 2019.

=== Popular press ===
Douglas EM, Hines DA, As I see it: Acting on risk factors to keep children safe. Worcester Telegram, 2015.
