= Officer-involved domestic violence =

Domestic violence committed by law enforcement officers

Officer-involved domestic violence (OIDV) or police officer-perpetrated domestic violence is domestic violence or intimate partner violence committed by law enforcement officers against their marital or intimate partners, children, and cohabitating and non-cohabitating family members. OIDV is characterized as "physical, sexual, emotional, economic, psychological, technological actions, and/or threats of actions or other patterns of coercive behavior that influence another person" including "any behaviors that intimidate, manipulate, humiliate, isolate, frighten, terrorize, coerce, threaten, blame, hurt, injure, or wound someone" with whom the officer has an intimate or familial relationship with.

Officer-involved domestic violence is difficult to collect empirical data on, prevent, and prosecute. This is due to the blue wall of silence, victims' belief in the "omnipotence of the abuser," and the offending officer's training in coercive tactics, knowledge of the law and court system, and access to surveillance technology. In the United States, it is also due to the state's unwillingness to investigate and charge officers with domestic violence because doing so would prevent them from possessing a firearm under the Domestic Violence Offender Gun Ban. These factors give officer-abusers access to tools, tactics, and training which allow them to be uniquely equipped abusers, endangering survivors, their families, and those who work with them.

The causes of OIDV are understudied, but may include the officer's exposure to violence at work, alcohol and substance abuse, familiarity with coercive force, access to firearms, and exposure to a culture of authoritarianism and hyper or militarized masculinity. The impact to survivors and their families is also understudied, with the first and last survivor-centered, U.S.-based OIDV research coming out in 1991 and 1992. Professor Leigh Goodmark states that OIDV cases can seem "exceptional" but are actually an "everyday occurrence."

== History & research ==
=== Australia ===
Research analyzing the lived experiences of 17 victim-survivors of OIDV in Australia finds that OIDV compounds a victim-survivor's sense of risk and creates significant barriers to seeking support, largely because police perpetrators utilize their unique knowledge, institutional power, and access to resources to commit abuse and undermine the victim's credibility. The authors conclude that organizational accountability and a comprehensive shift toward independent investigation are crucial to disrupt police solidarity and the institutional "code of silence" that currently protects abusive officers.

=== United States ===
==== 1991 Congressional Hearing "On the Front Lines: Police Stress and Family Well-being" ====
Conducted by the United States House Select Committee on Children, Youth, and Families on May 20, 1991, in Washington, D.C., this hearing offered testimony from professionals from police employment agencies, the FBI, police officers and spouses, police chiefs, psychologists from the American Psychological Association, and professors specializing in family welfare and workplace violence. One professor, Leanor Boulin-Johnson, testified that, while conducting a study of 728 officers and 479 spouses, one "officer dedicated to our efforts committed suicide, two women officers shot their husbands, a male officer killed his estranged wife and dozens of spouses in stable marriages shared with us heart rendering testimonies about their work-family tensions and hardships." Johnson's study attributed OIDV to workplace stress, alcohol abuse, and the "perceived requirements of the job-rugged individualism, authoritativeness, and emotional detachment." Her study found that 77 percent of spouses reported stress from the workplace, 36 percent of officers reported fear about their alcohol use, 40 percent of officers "stated that in the last six months prior to the survey they had gotten out of control and behaved violently towards their spouse and children" while only 10 percent of spouses reported recent spousal or child abuse, and that rates of violence increased with number of years on the force.

==== 1994 Violence Against Women Act ====
Signed into federal law on September 13, 1994, by President Bill Clinton, the Violence Against Women Act established domestic violence as "'criminal behavior' and a national crime problem, created federal law which "revised and expanded protections for women against violent crime," established grant programs for "state and local government for law enforcement, prosecution, and victim services in violent crimes against women" and battered women's shelters community programs on domestic violence, rural domestic violence, and child abuse enforcement," and created the "national domestic violence telephone hotline." Additionally, the Violence Against Women Act created a provision that any offender subject to a Domestic Violence Restraining Order is prohibited from possession of firearms. The act was reauthorized in 2000, 2005, 2013, and 2022 to expand the provisions to include stalking, support for the LGBTQ community, and procedures for tribal justice against Native American women.

==== 1996 Domestic Violence Offender Gun Ban ====
Also referred to as the "Lautenberg Amendment," named for its sponsor Senator Frank Lautenberg (D-NJ), the Domestic Violence Offender Gun Ban was enacted by Congress in conjunction with the Omnibus Consolidated Appropriations Act of 1997. The amendment expanded the provisions of the 1968 Gun Control Act, which prohibited those convicted of a felony domestic violence charge or subject to a protective order from owning or possessing a firearm, to include those convicted of minority domestic violence charges and contained broad directives for removal of firearms from individuals deemed to be a danger to themselves or others. This provision laid the legal groundwork for later risk-based gun removal laws also commonly known as "red flag laws."

==== 1997 Report on Domestic Violence in the Los Angeles Police Department ====
After the 1991 beating of African-American Rodney King on camera by Los Angeles Police Department (LAPD), investigative reports of LAPD conduct were performed, and one of the resulting reforms was the creation of the LAPD Inspector General's office. The first person to hold this office was Katherine Mader, and in 1997 she conducted a formal investigation of incidents of OIDV by LAPD officers, at the request of Los Angeles City Council. Of the 225 cases she was able to identify, occurring between 1990 and 1997, 30 percent of officers with complaints of OIDV were able to be promoted, and "repeat offenders on the force accounted for 31 percent of all domestic violence complaints in the department," while only 40 percent of all accusations resulted in written warnings or terminations. Of such punishments, Mader's report identified cases where an officer was "drunk in public, assaulting his wife, fleeing an accident and failing to have his car insured" which resulted in a 10-day suspension, as well as another officer who "was found by the department to have raped his girlfriend" and "received only an 'official reprimand,' and later that same year, "received another official reprimand after "inserting a 9-millimeter handgun into girlfriend's vagina without her consent." Mader later "quit in frustration" citing limitations to what data she was allowed to have access to, and "was even instructed that she could not speak to the civilian Police Commission that manages the department, but instead could report only to its executive director."

==== 1998 FBI Conference on Domestic Violence by Police Officers ====
In 1998, then Supervisory Special Agent of the Behavioral Science Unit at the FBI Donald C. Sheehan presented a report to the Bureau titled "Domestic Violence by Police Officers." The report presented additional evidence collected since 1991 which supported Johnson's 1991 claims, including a series of domestic violence surveys given to law enforcement officers. 385 male officers and 40 female officers responded to the first survey, with 41 percent of male officers and 40 percent of female officers reporting having engaged in recent incidents of domestic violence. A further 8 percent of male officers and 20 percent of female officers reported engaging in "'severe' physical aggression including choking, strangling, and/or the use or threatened use of a knife or gun." Additionally studies presented cited a 29 increase in OIDV cases in the past 24 months, with more than 45 percent of departments having no official policy for dealing with the issue. Furthermore, Sheehan's presentation identified that "if a police officer batters himself, his ability to conduct an objective investigation of the problem in other cases decreases," which leads to under-enforcement of domestic violence laws, underutilization of protective measures, and an increased "risk for use of excessive force."

==== 1999 International Association of Chiefs of Police Model Policy ====
Developed after four 1997 national summits hosted by police departments in New York City, NY, Indianapolis/Evansville, IN, Duke University, NC, and Charleston, the model for department policy on OIDV was released by the International Association of Chiefs of Police (IACP) in 1999. Beyond defining the scope of the issue, the IACP policy model has components related to "prevention, education, and training," including "early warning and intervention" tactics such as hiring screening and hierarchal responses from supervisors of abusive officers, "incident response protocols" including "securing the scene and collecting evidence," "ensuring an arrest is made where probable cause exists," "removing weapons in the event of an arrest," and "post-incident administrative and criminal decisions," including a recommendation that "if an officer is found guilty of domestic violence through the administrative investigation" or convicted for a domestic violence crime, "the officer's police powers must be revoked." The IACP revised the protocols in 2003 after notable OIDV cases to be identified below. The IACP model policy is only present in 10 states, and OIDV recognized as a specialized issue in 9 others, without any specific policy, and the model is considered a guideline, not reflective of any binding legal directive upon departments.

=== Mongolia ===
Analyzing seven semi-structured interviews with service providers finds pattern and prevalence of OIDV in Mongolia. Findings argue that OIDV occurs at higher rates than domestic violence in the general population and poor implementation and enforcement of domestic violence laws are linked to law enforcement's lack of operational capacity and institutional culture that maintains a "code of silence" to protect police reputation.

=== United Kingdom ===
Reviewing interviews with ten female intimate partners of male police perpetrators in England and Wales who went to report OIDV to a law enforcement agency, researchers categorized victims’ reporting experiences as either ‘hostile-obstructive’ or ‘collusive-minimising.’ This illustrates a "double bind" where victims are harmed by "society's guardians" and subsequently receive inadequate recognition from the police institution itself. The article frames these findings as institutional betrayal that necessitates urgent institutional courage and transparent reform to challenge the internal police culture that protects abusive officers.

In 2020, the Centre for Women's Justice filed a first-of-its-kind Super-Complaint against policing bodies in England and Wales, documenting systemic failures in how police forces handle OIDV allegations and outlining 11 overarching themes around barriers to reporting, investigative failings, conflicts of interest, and institutional cultures that undermined victim confidence. The official response investigated and accepted the findings and committed to national reforms which were largely accepted by law enforcement agencies across the country. Subsequent reviews by advocates and scholars have reported uneven progress, however, with OIDV-responses still hindered by the original issues reported in the 2020 Super-Complaint.

== Notable Cases ==
- On April 26, 2003, in Tacoma, Washington, Police Chief David Brame murdered his wife Crystal Judson using a firearm, at a shopping mall in the presence of their two young kids, and then committed suicide. Brame's abuse was long-term, included threats and previous acts of violence, and was enabled by his colleagues. The case and the media attention surrounding it caused the IACP to issue a revised policy of their earlier model and the U.S. government passed a law in 2005 which allows funds from the Violence Against Women Act to be spent under the Crystal Judson Brame Domestic Violence Protocol Program for widespread training and policy development.
- In September 2010, Michelle O' Connell died after a gunshot wound which was reported to 911 by her boyfriend Jeremy Banks, then deputy sheriff for St. Johns County in St. Augustine, FL. Banks claimed that O'Connell had committed suicide with his semiautomatic duty firearm, which was found next to her body. Banks, who had been drinking, was removed from the home and told to sober up. The sheriff investigating the incident chose to handle the investigation internally rather than call independent investigators. During the course of the investigation, forensic evidence was left untested, and reports from witnesses about domestic violence committed by Banks were disregarded. The medical examiner initially cited cause of death as suicide but was forced to change his finding to homicide after a New York Times and Frontline investigation, which resulted special investigators from the Florida Department of Law Enforcement re-examining the case, finding additional witnesses to the domestic violence. The Florida governor "appointed a special prosecutor, who ultimately decided there was insufficient evidence to prosecute and closed the case." The case was covered in a 2014 episode Frontline titled "A Death in St. Augustine."
- In January 2022, Hillsborough County Sheriff's Deputy Abigail Bieber was killed in a murder–suicide by her boyfriend and fellow deputy, Daniel Leyden, while vacationing with other off-duty deputies in St. Augustine, Florida. The couple had been dating for eight months, but Bieber had reportedly been planning to end the relationship during the trip. According to witnesses, an argument broke out in a closed room, and Bieber was heard pleading with Leyden to "put the gun down" before three gunshots rang out. Leyden then turned the gun on himself. The tragedy shocked the community and raised immediate concerns about prior allegations of abuse involving Leyden. In the aftermath, Abigail's father, Bruce Bieber, launched a campaign to bring national attention to OIDV—an issue he argues is underreported and insufficiently addressed within law enforcement. Advocates like Bieber and other law enforcement professionals are urging agencies to adopt model guidelines—developed decades ago by the International Association of Chiefs of Police—to prevent similar tragedies.
