= Domestic violence in transgender relationships =

Pattern of violent and coercive behavior in a transgender relationship

- Other names: Transgender intimate partner violence
- Field: Domestic violence, Intimate partner violence
- Affected groups: Transgender people
- Forms: Physical, sexual and psychological abuse; threats, stalking, isolation and controlling behaviour
- Related topics: Violence against transgender people, Domestic violence in lesbian relationships

Domestic violence in transgender relationships is a pattern of violence or abuse that occurs within relationships involving one or more transgender people. A 2020 review of literature found that transgender people are more likely to experience intimate partner violence compared to cisgender people, with comparable rates of violence being experienced by trans men, trans women, and non-binary individuals.

Transgender people may be in relationships with people of any gender, but they experience high rates of domestic violence. Comparatively, little research has been conducted on domestic violence towards transgender individuals, especially within the context of romantic relationships. In a 2009 United States study, 56% to 66% of transgender individuals reported experiencing violence within their homes, though not necessarily by a romantic partner.

In 2020, a systematic review of 85 journal articles was published in the American Journal of Public Health to determine the prevalence and correlates of transgender-based intimate partner violence. On average, 37.5% of transgender people reported experiencing physical violence, and 25% reported experiencing sexual violence perpetrated by a current or former partner. Compared to cisgender people, transgender individuals were more likely to experience all forms of intimate partner violence, including physical, sexual, and psychological abuse, threats, stalking, isolation, and controlling behaviours.

== See also ==
- Domestic violence in lesbian relationships
- Transgender Day of Remembrance
- Violence against LGBT people
- Violence against transgender people
