= Domestic violence register =

Public list of persons convicted of domestic violence

A domestic violence register is a publicly available list of persons convicted of domestic violence.

Tennessee enacted a law about creating a register in 2022, called Savanna's law after a woman killed by her partner who had a record of domestic abuse before he met her. Domestic violence registers have been proposed in several other U.S. states. In Ireland, a register will be created after a law called Jennie's law was passed.

Proponents of domestic violence registers argue that they will prevent deaths and violence by enabling (primarily) women to look up prospective partners. Others argue that they will create a false sense of security and that they will reveal the victims' as well as the perpetrators. This might mean victims are less likely to contact law enforcement.
