= Domestic violence in lesbian relationships =

Domestic violence within lesbian relationships is a pattern of violent and coercive behavior in a female same-sex relationship wherein a woman seeks to control the thoughts, beliefs, or conduct of her female intimate partner. Physical abuse in lesbian relationships is also referred to as lesbian battering.

== Prevalence ==
Domestic violence research began before 1980, but research on lesbian violence was often neglected, both in academic analyses and in the establishment of social services for battered women.

A 2010 CDC survey compared domestic violence victimization rates between lesbian, bisexual, and heterosexual women. The differences between most forms of reported domestic violence rates between lesbian women and heterosexual women were found to be non-significant due to insufficient statistical power.

In the survey, 43.8% of lesbian women reported experiencing physical violence, stalking, or rape by an intimate partner of any gender in their lifetime. Out of those reporting abuse, two thirds (28.9% of the total sample) reported exclusively female perpetrators.

In the same study, 61.1% of bisexual women reported physical violence, stalking, or rape by their partners (of any gender). Out of those reporting abuse, 89.5% (or 54% of the total sample) reported male perpetrators.

In the same study, 35% of heterosexual women reported experiencing physical violence, stalking, or rape by an intimate partner of any gender in their lifetime. Of those who reported abuse, 98.7% (or 34% of the total sample) reported male perpetrators exclusively.

The Encyclopedia of Victimology and Crime Prevention states, "For several methodological reasons – nonrandom sampling procedures and self-selection factors, among others – it is not possible to assess the extent of same-sex domestic violence. Studies on abuse between gay male or lesbian partners usually rely on small convenience samples such as lesbian or gay male members of an association." Some sources state or assume that same-sex couples experience domestic violence at the same frequency as heterosexual couples. Other sources that state that LGB individuals might experience either higher or lower rates of domestic violence than heterosexual individuals, or that people are less likely to report abuse in same-sex relationships.

The issue of domestic violence among lesbian couples may be underreported due to the gender roles that women are expected to play in society; violence perpetrated by women may be ignored due to beliefs that the male social construction itself is a primary source of violence. The social construction of women is characterized as passive, dependent, nurturing, and highly emotional, and the social construction of men is characterized as competitive, aggressive, strong, and even prone to violence. Due to forms of discrimination, homophobia, and heterosexism, and the belief that heterosexuality is normative within society, domestic violence has been characterized as being between the male perpetrator and the female victim. This contributes to the invisibility of all domestic violence perpetrated by women. Further, the fear of reinforcing negative stereotypes could lead some community members, activists, and victims to deny the extent of violence among lesbians. Social service agencies are often unwilling to assist victims of domestic violence perpetrated by women. Victims of domestic violence in lesbian relationships are less likely to have the case prosecuted within existing legal systems.

In an effort to overcome the denial of domestic violence in lesbian relationships, advocates for abused women often concentrate on similarities between homosexual and heterosexual domestic violence. The main goal of activists is to validate lesbian domestic violence as real abuse and validate the experience of its victims.

=== Other factors of unreliability ===
Literature and research regarding domestic violence in lesbian relationships is relatively limited, including in the United States, United Kingdom, and Australia. Many different factors play into this, such as "different definitions of domestic violence, non-random, self-selected and opportunistic sampling methods (often organisation or agency based, or advertising for participants who have experienced violence) and different methods and types of data collected". This causes results to be unreliable, thus making it difficult to make general assumptions about the rates of lesbian domestic violence. This has caused rates of violence in lesbian relationships to range from 17 to 73 percent as of the 1990s, being too large of a scale to accurately determine the pervasiveness of lesbian abuse in the community.

Since not all lesbians are open about their sexuality, large random samples are difficult to obtain and therefore are unable to show trends in the general lesbian community. Research samples tend to be smaller, causing report rates of violence to be lower than they may be. This is "a consequence of the invisibility of such violence and fear of homophobic reactions".

Theoretical analysis of domestic violence in lesbian relationships is heavily debated. Popular approaches mainly discuss "the comparability of violence in lesbian and gay male relationships (same sex violence) or draw on feminist theories of gendered power relations, comparing domestic violence between lesbians and heterosexual women". Some theorists also study same sex violence by defining gender as anatomy, and claim that gender is not relevant in any case of domestic violence due to its prevalence in same-sex relationships that is perpetrated as a form of homophobic behavior and occurs without consequence. Other theorists argue that gay men and lesbians still internalize feminine and masculine behaviors, causing lesbians to "mimic traditional heterosexual relationships" and create blatant power dynamics between dominant and submissive partners.

== Forms ==
The scope of domestic violence among lesbian relationships displays the pattern of intimidation, coercion, or violence that achieves enhanced power and control for the perpetrator over her partner. The forms of domestic violence in lesbian relationships include physical abuse, such as hitting, choking, using weapons, or restraining, often referred to as "battering"; emotional abuse, such as lying, neglecting, and degrading; intimidation threats, such as threats to harm the victim, their family, or their pets; sexual abuse, such as forcing sex or refusing safe sex; destruction of property, such as vandalizing the home and damaging furniture, clothing, or personal objects; economic, such as controlling the victim's money and forcing financial dependence. In addition, psychological abuse was found to be common among lesbian victims. Outing is a specific and unique form of psychological abuse found in the LGBTQ community. This includes threatening to disclose someone's sexuality or relationship status to family, friends, and workplace as a form of control. Findings from studies have shown that slapping was the most commonly reported form of abuse, while beatings and assaults with weapons were less frequent. Sexual violence within lesbian relationships was found to be as high as 55%. The most frequent type included forced kissing, breast, and genital fondling, and oral, anal, or vaginal penetration. Eighty percent of victims reported psychological abuse and verbal abuse. Lesbians are also less likely to use physical force or threats than gay men.

== Contributing factors ==
=== General ===
Factors that contribute to domestic violence include the belief that abuse (physical or verbal) is acceptable, substance abuse, unemployment, mental health problems, lack of coping skills, isolation, and excessive dependence on the abuser.

=== Stigma towards lesbians ===
Lesbian couples frequently experience social stigma against them, including experiences of discrimination and bias against them, as well as other minority stress factors which can include the fear of outing, internalized homophobia, the butch/femme identity, and relationship quality.

The stressors associated with this stigmatization can increase emotional distress in lesbians, including higher rates of depression and anxiety disorders. These stressors increase the likelihood of alcohol being used as a coping mechanism. Sexual minorities, including lesbians, have higher rates of alcohol consumption which can factor into domestic violence.

=== Alcohol use ===
Alcohol use, especially discrepant drinking, and domestic violence have found to have significant association. Discrepant drinking is the difference in alcohol use between partners. Alcohol use has been linked with physical and psychological aggression in same-sex relationships. It has also been found that physical and psychological aggression in a relationship can predict alcohol use in the future. This demonstrates the cyclical nature of intimate partner violence and alcohol use. Alcohol use is an important risk factor for domestic violence in lesbian relationships.

=== Past experiences with domestic violence and abuse ===
Many lesbians who are either battered or batter have had experience with domestic violence and sexual assault, often familial or as a child, including beatings, incest, molestation, and verbal abuse. In growing up in living situations where violence is "normalized", the partner often does not label the problem or recognize that the violence within the relationship is an issue. This can also translate into how the couple raise potential children and implement discipline.

=== Power and control ===
Domestic violence in lesbian relationships happens for many reasons. Domestic violence can occur due to control. Violence is most frequently employed as a tactic for achieving interpersonal power or control over their partner. Also perceived loss of power or control may also lead to increased violence within the relationship. The alienation and isolation imposed by internalized and external oppression may construct loss of control, and the need to reclaim it becomes the central concern for lesbians. Lesbians may be denied control over numerous aspects of their lives. However, if she remains in the closet, she is also denied control, subjected to continuous self-monitoring, and forced to deal with stress so that she could hide her identity and her intimate relationship from the eyes of others. The perpetrator of violence in an intimate relationship can also threaten their partner to abduct their children if only one has legal custody of their children. On the contrary, there have also been cases of lesbians and lesbian couples that become guardian ad litems and households that have been licensed to provide temporary foster care for children that are vulnerable to domestic violence. Power and control take advantage the most intimate parts of lesbian relationships, including sex life and the individual agency of the victim in the relationship.

=== Dependency and self-esteem factors ===
Another reason why domestic violence can occur is dependency. The need to achieve balance between separateness and connection has been identified as the primary task in relationships, and is a specifically frequent problem in lesbian relationships. The degree of dependence on a relationship and on one's intimate partner causes abuse. Lesbians who report more frequent use of violent tactics in conflict with their partner will report a higher level of dependency as a personality trait.

Dependency in lesbian relationships is also a result of female-specific socialization. Since women have been socialized for "togetherness" and cooperative living, women often struggle with balancing social life and being alone. A study found that lesbians are more likely to spend free time at home than homosexual men are. In lesbian relationships, women often find it difficult to spend time apart because they feel pressured to take care of one another. Women may assume that spending time away from their partner would make them upset or angry. Without proper communication, improper management of time may lead to unhealthy discourse within a relationship, and partner equality remains difficult to maintain.

Self-esteem is another underlying factor of domestic abuse. Low self-esteem and a negative self-image are qualities that characterize both perpetrators and victims of heterosexual domestic violence. The jealousy and the possessiveness that are frequently linked to battering behavior are associated with problems of low self-esteem and negative self-concept. Lesbians who report more frequent use of violent tactics in conflicts with their partners will report a lower level of self-esteem as a personality trait.

== See also ==
- Controlling behavior in relationships
- Cycle of abuse
- Domestic violence in same-sex relationships
- Economic abuse
- In the Dream House
- Intimate Partner Violence
- Lesbian
- Physical abuse
- Sexual assault of LGBT persons
- Verbal abuse
- Women's shelter
