= Economic abuse =

Form of abuse

Economic abuse is a form of abuse when one abusive person has control over the victim's access to economic resources, which diminishes the victim's capacity to support themselves and forces them to depend on the perpetrator financially.

It is related to, or also known as, financial abuse, which is the illegal or unauthorized use of a person's property, money, pension book or other valuables (including changing the person's will to name the abuser as heir), often fraudulently obtaining power of attorney, followed by deprivation of money or other property, or by eviction from own home. Financial abuse applies to both elder abuse and domestic violence.

== Role in domestic violence ==
Economic abuse in a domestic situation may involve:

- Preventing a cohabitant from resource acquisition, such as restricting their ability to find employment, maintain or advance their careers, and acquire assets.
- Preventing the victim from obtaining education.
- Spend the victim's money without their consent and create debt, or completely spend the victim's savings to limit available resources.
- Exploiting economic resources of the victim.

In its extreme (and usual) form, this involves putting the victim on a strict "allowance", withholding money at will and forcing the victim to beg for the money until the abuser gives the victim some money. It is common for the victim to receive less and less money as the abuse continues. This also includes (but is not limited to) preventing the victim from finishing education or obtaining employment, or intentionally squandering or misusing communal resources.

=== Controlling mechanism ===
Economic abuse is often used as a controlling mechanism as part of a larger pattern of domestic abuse, which may include verbal, emotional, physical and sexual abuse. Physical abuse may include threats or attempts to kill the cohabitant. By restricting the victim's access to economic resources, the offender has limited recourses to exit the abusive or violent relationship.

The following are ways that abusers may use economic abuse with other forms of domestic violence:

- Using physical force, or threat of violence, to get money.
- Providing money for sexual activity.
- Controlling access to a telephone, vehicle or ability to go shopping; other forms of isolation.
- Threatening to evict the cohabitants from the house without financial support.
- Exploiting the victim's economic disadvantage.
- Destroying or taking resources from the cohabitants.
- Blaming the victim for an inability to manage money; or instigating other forms of economic abuse, such as destruction of property.

Victimization occurs across all socio-economic levels, and when victims are asked why they stay in abusive relationships, "lack of income" is a common response.

=== Job-related impacts ===
There are several ways that abusers may impact a victim's economic resources. As mentioned earlier, the abuser may prevent the victim from working or make it very difficult to maintain a job. They may likewise impede their ability to obtain an education. Frequent phone calls, surprise visits and other harassing activities interfere with the cohabitant's work performance. In case of a cohabitant being homosexual, bisexual, transgender, or questioning of their sexuality (LGBTQ), the abuser may threaten to "out them" with their employer.

The National Coalition Against Domestic Violence in the United States reports that:

- 25–50% of victims of abuse from a partner have lost their job due to domestic violence.
- 35–56% of victims of domestic violence are harassed at work by their partners.

=== Impact of lack of economic resources ===
By denying the victim access to money, such as forbidding the victim from maintaining a bank account, he or she is totally financially dependent upon the abuser for shelter, food, clothing and other necessities. In some cases the abuser may withhold those necessities, also including medicine and personal hygiene products. They may also greatly limit their ability to leave the abusive situation by refusing to pay court-ordered spousal or child support.

Abusers may also force their victims to obtain credit and then through negligent activities ruin their credit rating and ability to get credit. This form of abuse is also referred to as coerced debt.

=== Managing economic abuse ===
There are several ways to manage economic abuse: ensure one has safe access to important personal and financial records, ensure one's research activities are not traceable and, if they believe that they are going to leave the cohabitation, they should prepare ahead of time.

In the United Kingdom, the charity Surviving Economic Abuse has resources on de-linking from abusers, debts, banking and housing.

== Role in mate crime ==
Economic abuse is a common feature of mate crime, which is the act of befriending a vulnerable person with the intent of exploiting them.

Examples of economic abuse in mate crime include:

- Stealing the victim's money
- Borrowing money or items from the victim with no intention of repayment or return
- Misusing items paid for with the victim's money (e.g. eating food stored in the victim's cupboards)

Perpetrators of mate crime may routinely visit at times their victims are paid money (such as welfare benefits) to maximise such abuse.

== Role in elder abuse ==
The elderly are sometimes victims of financial abuse from people within their family:

- Money or property is used without their permission or taken from them.
- Their signature is forged for financial transactions.
- Coerced or influenced into signing over deeds, wills, or power of attorney.
- Deceived into believing that money is exchanged for the promise of lifelong care.

Family members engaged in financial abuse of the elderly may include spouses, children, or grandchildren. They may engage in the activity because they feel justified, for instance, they are taking what they might later inherit or have a sense of "entitlement" due to a negative personal relationship with the older person. Or they may take money or property to prevent other family members from getting the money or for fear that their inheritance may be lost due to the cost of treating illnesses. Sometimes, family members take money or property from their elders because of gambling or other financial problems or substance abuse.

It is estimated that there may be 5 million elderly citizens of the United States subject to financial abuse each year.

== Laws ==
=== United States ===
The Survivors’ Empowerment and Economic Security Act was introduced by the 110th United States Congress to the Senate (S. 1136) and House of Representatives (H.R. 2395) to allow for greater economic freedom for domestic violence victims by providing short-term emergency benefits where needed, guaranteeing employment leave and unemployment compensation, and prohibit insurance restriction or job discrimination to domestic violence victims.

=== United Kingdom ===
Economic abuse is officially recognised in UK law. It was first defined in law in the Domestic Abuse Act 2021, which was introduced into parliament in early 2020 and was given Royal Assent on 29 April 2021. The Act defines economic abuse as any behaviour that has a substantial adverse effect on a victim's ability to acquire, use or maintain money or other property, or obtain goods or services. The Act also calls for a Domestic Abuse Commissioner role to monitor the government's response to domestic abuse.

Previously, economic abuse could be prosecuted as controlling or coercive behavior under the Serious Crime Act 2015.

== See also ==
- Abusive power and control
- Codependency
- Extortion
- Human trafficking
- Protection racket
- Redlining
- Race to the bottom
- Throffer
