= List of domestic violence hotlines =

Domestic violence hotlines provide emergency support and referral services over the phone those in volatile relationships. Hotlines are generally dedicated to women escaping abusive relationships and provide referral to women's shelters.

Domestic violence hotlines are generally available at all times during the day, however, problems with busy lines or disconnections due to lack of funding sometimes limit their usefulness. Additionally, battered gay men report that hotline workers will sometimes not provide them with services or will refer them to the batterers' line. Nonetheless, scholars assume that hotlines reduce frequency of domestic violence.

== Australia ==
Region	Service	Website
Nationwide	1800 RESPECT	website
New South Wales	Domestic Violence NSW	website
Victoria	Domestic Violence Resource Centre Victoria	website
Queensland	Domestic Violence Hotline Queensland	website
South Australia	Domestic Violence Crisis Service	website
Western Australia	Women’s Domestic Violence Helpline	website
Northern Territory	N/A	
Tasmania	Family Violence Counselling and Support Service	website
ACT	Domestic Violence Crisis Service ACT	website

== Canada ==
Region	Service	Website
Ontario	Assaulted Women's Helpline	website
Quebec	SOS violence conjugale (24/7) 1 800 363-9010	website
British Columbia	VictimLink BC	website
Alberta	Family Violence Info Line	website
Manitoba	Domestic Violence Crisis Line	website
Saskatchewan	Prince Albert Safe Shelter for Women	website
Nova Scotia	Bryony House	website
New Brunswick		
Newfoundland & Labrador		
Prince Edward Island	Island Help Line	website

== China ==
Region	Service	Website
	Women's Hotline in Beijing	website

== Denmark ==
Region	Service	Website
Nationwide	Psykiatrifonden, Mental Health Helpline	website

== Finland ==
Region	Service	Website
Nationwide	Nollalinja	website

== France ==
Region	Service	Website
Nationwide	Violences Femmes Infos	website

== Germany ==
Region	Service	Language	Website
Nationwide	Hilfetelefon Gewalt gegen Frauen (for women)	Service available in 18 languages	website
Nationwide	Hilfetelefon Gewalt an Männern (for men)	German, English, Turkish	website

== Italy ==
Region	Service	Website
Nationwide	1522	website

== Japan ==
Region	Service	Website
Nationwide	The Purple Dial Sexual and Domestic Violence Hotline	

== Mexico ==
Region	Service	Website
Nationwide	Consejo Psicológico e Intervención en Crisis por Teléfono (SAPTEL)	
Nationwide	Línea de la Vida	

== New Zealand ==
Region	Service	Website
Nationwide	Women's Refuge (Domestic Violence Crisis Line)	website

== Pakistan ==
Region	Service	Website
Nationwide	Ministry of human rights-Women - Managing and operating Shaheed Benazir Bhutto Human Rights Centre for Women in Islamabad. Address: Shaheed Benazir Bhutto Human Rights Centre for Women, Sector H-8/1, St # 04, Pitrass Bukhari Road, Near City School, Ministry of Human Rights, Islamabad. Contact: Manager Numbers:- 051-9101256, 9101257, 9101258. Helpline — 1099 for free legal advice	website
Nationwide	Phone: 042-35842256-7	
Nationwide	Sindh Legal Advisory Call Centre (SLACC) Helpline - Toll-free 0800-70806	
Nationwide	Digital Rights Foundation’s Cyber Harassment Helpline - Toll-free 0800-39393 Visit everyday 9:00 a.m. to 5:00 p.m. Email: helpdesk@digitalrightsfoundation.pk	
Nationwide	Rozan Helpline - FREE Telephonic Counseling 0800-22444, 0303-4442288 (*Regular charges) Mon-Sat, 10:00 am - 6:00 pm	
Punjab	The Punjab Women’s Toll-Free Helpline 1043 and online complaint form is available 24/7	website

== Slovenia ==
Region	Service	Website
Nationwide	080 11 55	website

== South Africa ==
Region	Service	Website
Global	What Works	https://www.whatworks.co.za/about/where-we-work/south-africa
Nationwide	Tears	https://www.tears.co.za/
Nationwide	South African Police Service	https://www.saps.gov.za/resource_centre/women_children/women_children.php
Nationwide	Sonke Gender Justice	https://genderjustice.org.za/helpline-numbers/
Nationwide	Social Department	http://gbv.org.za/about-us/
Nationwide	For Women by 1st for Women Insurance	https://www.for-women.co.za/help-line
Nationwide	Soul City Institute for Social Justice	https://www.soulcity.org.za/
Nationwide	Gender-Based Violence Command Centre	0800 428 428
Nationwide	Families South Africa	http://famsa.org.za/
Nationwide	Childline South Africa	https://www.childlinesa.org.za/
Nationwide	Action Society	https://www.actionsociety.co.za/
Nationwide	Stop Gender Violence helpline	website
Gauteng	People Opposing Women Abuse	https://www.powa.co.za/POWA/
Western Cape	Given Gain	https://www.givengain.com/c/traumacentre/about

== South Korea ==
Region	Service	Website
Nationwide	Korea Women's Hot Line	website

== Taiwan ==
Region	Service	Website
Nationwide	113 Protection Hotline	website

== United Kingdom ==
Region	Service	Website
Nationwide	Domestic Violence Helpline	website
Nationwide	ManKind Initiative	website
Nationwide	Refuge	website

== United States ==
Region	Service	Website
Nationwide	National Domestic Violence Hotline	website
Nationwide	National Deaf Domestic Violence Hotline	website
NYC	NYC HOPE	website

== United Arab Emirates ==
Region	Service	Website
Dubai	Dubai Foundation for Women and Children	website
