= Domestic violence in the United States =

Violence by intimate partners or family members against one another in the U.S.

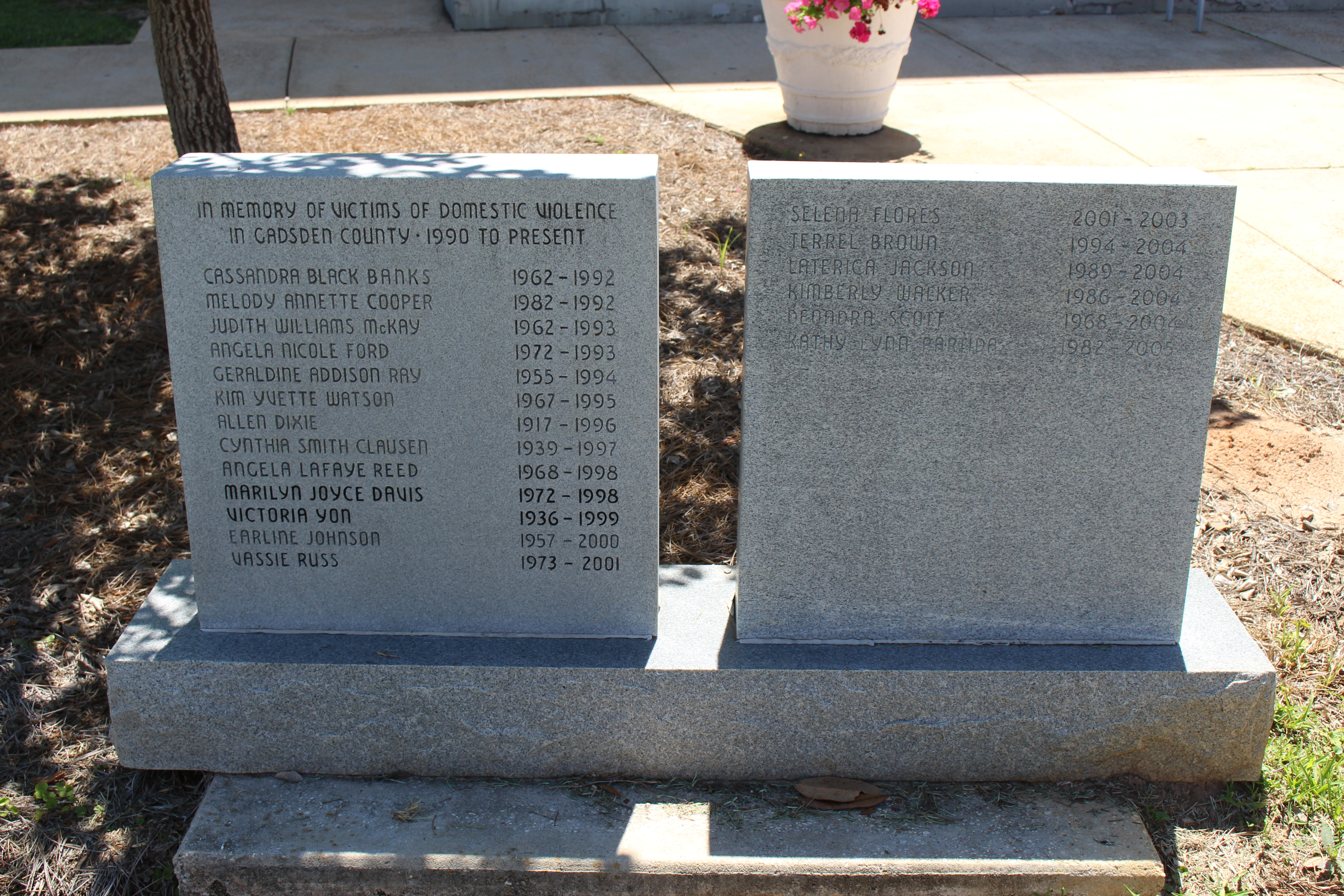
Victims of Domestic Violence marker, Courthouse Square, Quincy, Florida

Domestic violence most often describes a pattern of violence between partners in the context of an intimate relationship, but it may also describe other household violence, such as violence against a child, by a child against a parent, or violence between siblings in the same household. In the United States, it is recognized as an important social problem by governmental and non-governmental agencies, and various Violence Against Women Acts have been passed by the US Congress in an attempt to stem this tide.

Victimization from domestic violence transcends the boundaries of gender and sexual orientation. but men are also subject to domestic violence in significant numbers, including in incidents of physical partner violence. Significant percentages of LGBT couples also face domestic violence issues. Social and economically disadvantaged groups in the U.S. regularly face worse rates of domestic violence than other groups. For example, about 60% of Native American women are physically assaulted in their lifetime by a partner or spouse.

Many scholarly studies of the problem have stated that domestic violence is often part of a dynamic of control and oppression in relationships, regularly involving multiple forms of physical and non-physical abuse taking place concurrently. Intimate terrorism is an ongoing, complicated use of control, power and abuse in which one person tries to assert systematic control over another psychologically. Homeless shelters exist in many states as well as special hotlines for people to call for immediate assistance, with non-profit agencies trying to fight the stigma that people face in reporting these issues.

== Definitions ==
According to the Merriam-Webster dictionary definition, domestic violence is: "the inflicting of physical injury by one family or household member on another; also: a repeated or habitual pattern of such behavior."

The following definition applies for the purposes of subchapter III of chapter 136 of title 42 of the US Code:

The term 'domestic violence' includes felony or misdemeanor crimes of violence committed by a current or former spouse of the victim, by a person with whom the victim shares a child in common, by a person who is cohabitating with or has cohabitated with the victim as a spouse, by a person similarly situated to a spouse of the victim under the domestic or family violence laws of the jurisdiction receiving grant monies, or by any other person against an adult or youth victim who is protected from that person's acts under the domestic or family violence laws of the jurisdiction.

It was inserted into the Violence Against Women Act of 1994 by section 3(a) of the Violence Against Women and Department of Justice Reauthorization Act of 2005.

It also applies for the purposes of section 7275 of subpart 17 of Part D of subchapter V of chapter 70 of title 20, section 1437F of subchapter I of chapter 8 of title 42, and subchapter XII-H of chapter 46 of title 42 of the US Code.

It is also the definition used by the US Office on Violence Against Women (OVW)

== Forms of domestic violence ==
Domestic violence may include verbal, emotional, economic, physical and sexual abuse. All forms of domestic abuse have one purpose: to gain and maintain control over the victim. Abusers use many tactics to exert power over their spouse or partner: dominance, humiliation, isolation, threats, intimidation, denial and blame.

The dynamics between the couple may include

- Situational couple violence, which arises out of conflicts that escalate to arguments and then to violence, is not connected to a general pattern of control, generally infrequent, and likely the most common type of intimate partner violence. Women are as likely as men to be abusers, however, women are somewhat more likely to be physically injured, but are also more likely to successfully find police intervention.
- Intimate terrorism (IT), involves a pattern of ongoing control using emotional, physical and other forms of domestic violence and is what generally leads victims. It is what was traditionally the definition of domestic violence and is generally illustrated with the "Power and Control Wheel" to illustrate the different and inter-related forms of abuse.
- Violent resistance (VR), or "self-defense", is violence perpetrated by victims against their abusive partners.
- Common couple violence, where both partners are engaged in domestic violence actions.
- Mutual violent control (MVC) is a rare type of intimate partner violence that occurs when both partners act in a violent manner, battling for control.

== Incidence ==
Between 960,000 and 3,000,000 incidents of domestic violence are reported each year, while many other incidents go unreported. It is estimated that more than ten million people experience domestic violence in the U.S. each year.

The ten states with the highest rate of females murdered by males were, as of 2010, Nevada, South Carolina, Tennessee, Louisiana, Virginia, Texas, New Mexico, Hawaii, Arizona, Georgia. In 2009, for homicides in which the victim to offender relationship could be identified, 93% of female victims were murdered by a male they knew, 63% of them in the context of an intimate relationship.

Several studies in the U.S. have found that domestic violence is more common in the families of police officers than in the general population. Early studies found that between 24% and 40% of participating families of police officers reported incidents of domestic violence. Subsequent studies suggested possible rates of officer-involved domestic violence that ranged from 4.8% to 28%, meaning the rate could be the same as that of the general public. The prevalence of domestic violence in law enforcement is important, as police attitudes toward domestic violence affect the quality of police intervention in domestic violence situations.

=== Gender aspects of abuse ===
According to the Centers for Disease Control and Prevention (CDC), in 2022 individuals identifying as women and men reported intimate partner violence around 41% and 26%, respectively, in the United States. The National Crime Victimization Survey (NCVS) indicates that in 1998 about 876,340 violent crimes were committed in the U.S. against women by their current or former spouses, or boyfriends. According to the Centers for Disease Control and Prevention, in the United States 41% of women and 26% of men experience intimate partner violence in their lifetime, under "contact sexual violence, physical violence, and/or stalking".

Research reviews have concluded that women's physical violence against men is more likely to be caused by self-defense and/or retaliation. A 2010 systematic review of the literature on women's perpetration of IPV found that anger, self-defense and retaliation were common motivations but that distinguishing between self-defense and retaliation was difficult.

With regard to similar rates and a difference in methods, a study compiled by Martin S. Fiebert, suggested that women are as likely to be violent to men, but that men are less likely to be hurt. He, however, stated that men are seriously injured in 38 percent of the cases in which "extreme aggression" is used. Fiebert additionally stated that his work was not meant to minimize the serious effects of men who abuse women. (Note: Martin S. Fiebert of the Department of Psychology at California State University, Long Beach, has compiled an annotated bibliography of research relating to spousal abuse by women on men. This bibliography examines 275 scholarly investigations: 214 empirical studies and 61 reviews and/or analyses appear to demonstrate that women are as physically aggressive, or more aggressive, than men in their relationships with their spouses or male partners. The aggregate sample size in the reviewed studies exceeds 365,000. In a Los Angeles Times article about male victims of domestic violence, Fiebert suggests that "...consensus in the field is that women are as likely as men to strike their partner but that—as expected—women are more likely to be injured than men.") A 2011 review by researcher Chan Ko Ling from the University of Hong Kong found that perpetration of minor partner violence was equal for both men and women but more severe partner violence was far likelier to be perpetrated by men. His analysis found that men were more likely to beat up, choke or strangle their partners while women were more likely to throw objects, slap, kick, bite, punch, or hit with an object. The Bureau of Justice Statistics also reported that women are far more likely to use objects. The National Institute of Justice contends that national surveys supported by NIJ, the Centers for Disease Control and Prevention, and the Bureau of Justice Statistics that examine more serious assaults do not support the conclusion of similar rates of male and female spousal assaults. These surveys are conducted within a safety or crime context and find more partner abuse by men against women. (Note: The National Institute of Justice states that studies finding equal or greater frequency of abuse by women against men are based on data compiled through the Conflict Tactics Scale. This survey tool was developed in the 1970s and may not be appropriate for intimate partner violence research because it does not measure control, coercion, or the motives for conflict tactics; it also leaves out sexual assault and violence by ex-spouses or partners and does not determine who initiated the violence.)

Straus and Gelles found that in couples reporting spousal violence, 27 percent of the time the man struck the first blow; in 24 percent of cases, the woman initiated the violence. The rest of the time, the violence was mutual, with both partners brawling. The results were the same even when the most severe episodes of violence were analyzed. In order to counteract claims that the reporting data was skewed, female-only surveys were conducted, asking females to self-report, and the data was the same. The simple tally of physical acts is typically found to be similar in those studies that examine both directions, but studies show that male violence is more serious. Male violence does more damage than female violence; women are more likely to be injured and/or hospitalized. Women are more likely to be killed by an intimate than the reverse (according to the Department of Justice, the rate is 63.7% to 36.3%), and women in general are more likely to be killed by their spouses than by all other types of assailants combined.

Studies have found that men are much less likely to report victimization in these situations. According to some studies, less than 1% of domestic violence cases are reported to the police. In the United States 10–35% of the population will be physically aggressive towards a partner at some point in their lives. As abuse becomes more severe women become increasingly overrepresented as victims. The National Violence Against Women Survey for 2000 reported that 25% of women and 7.6% of men reported being victims of intimate partner violence at some point in their lives. The rate of intimate partner violence in the U.S. declined from 1993 until 2014, after which the number of women killed by an intimate partner began to rise while the number of men killed by an intimate partner continued to decline.

In a 2006 Amnesty International report, The Maze of Injustice: The Failure to Protect Indigenous Women From Sexual Violence in the USA, the data for Native women indicates high levels of sexual violence. Statistics gathered by the U.S. government reveal that Native American and Alaska Native women are more than 2.5 times more likely to be sexual assaulted than women in the United States in general; more than one in three Native women will be raped in their lifetime.

=== Statistics ===
==== Over the past few decades ====
- In 1995–96, a UN national study found that 1% of all women participants (over 18, with or without partners or spouses) had been victims of domestic abuse within the previous 12-month period. Since this population included women who had never been partnered, the prevalence of domestic violence may have been greater among partnered women.
- In 2000, a report by the United States Department of Justice found that 1.3% of women and 0.9% of men reported experiencing domestic violence in the past year.
- About 2.3 million people are raped or physically assaulted each year by a current or former intimate partner or spouse.
- Physically assaulted women receive an average of 6.9 physical assaults by the same partner per year.
- In 2019, a study found that the number of women murdered by an intimate partner had increased to an average of almost four per day. It reflected a gradual rise in the figures since 2014 after a steady reduction over the previous 40 years. Focusing just on gun-related deaths, it was reported in 2019 that 50 American women per month were shot and killed by intimate partners.
- Female victimization rates may vary by race or ethnicity, as white women and black women were more likely to be victims of beatings than were Asian or Hispanic women, according to a 2012 study.
- A mid‑year report from the Council on Criminal Justice (CCJ), which monitors crime trends across a sample of large U.S. cities, indicates that the first half of 2026 continued the broad downward trajectory in crime observed in prior years. Of the thirteen offense categories tracked, nine recorded declines compared with the same period in 2025. Against this general backdrop of falling crime, however, reported domestic violence incidents rose by 8 percent.

==== During pregnancy ====
The United States was one of the countries identified by a United Nations study with a high rate of domestic violence resulting in death during pregnancy.

==== During one's lifetime ====
- According to The Centers for Disease Control and Prevention and The National Institute of Justice, nearly 25% of women experience at least one physical assault during adulthood by a partner.
- 22% of the women had been subject to domestic violence during some period of their life, according to a United Nations study. Since this population included women who had never been married or partnered, the prevalence of domestic violence may have been greater.
- According to a report by the United States Department of Justice in 2000, a survey of 16,000 Americans showed 22.1 percent of women and 7.4 percent of men reported being physically assaulted by a current or former spouse, cohabiting partner, boyfriend or girlfriend, or date in their lifetime.
- 60% of American Indian and Alaska Native women will be physically assaulted in their lifetime.
- A 2013 report by the American Centers for Disease Control and Prevention (CDC) found that 26% of male homosexuals and 44% of lesbians surveyed reported experiencing intimate partner violence. The study evaluated 2010 data from the National Intimate Partner and Sexual Violence Survey, which involved over 16,000 U.S. adults.

==== Injury ====
In 1992, domestic violence was the leading cause of injury for women between 15 and 44; more than rapes, muggings, and car accidents combined. The levels of domestic injury against men have not been investigated to the same extent.

==== Rape ====
- 1 in 71 men and 1 in 5 women have experienced an attempted or completed rape (with 1 in 21 men being made to penetrate someone). More than one in three American Indian and Alaska Native women will be raped in their lifetimes.
- A 2013 CDC study stated that 28% of straight women who had been raped experienced their first rape as a child, with the crime taking place between the ages of 11 and 17.

==== Murder ====
Comparative rates of homicides involving family members between 1980 and 2008. Killing by a spouse or ex-spouse exceeds the rate of all other categories. In proportion to the total number of family homicides, killing by spouses and ex-spouses fell from 52% to 37% during this period. Meanwhile, murder of the children went up 57%.

Women are more likely than men to be murdered by an intimate partner. Of those killed by an intimate partner, about three quarters are female and about a quarter are male. In 1999 in the United States, 1,218 women and 424 men were killed by an intimate partner, and 1,181 females and 329 males were killed by their intimate partners in 2005. In 2007, 2,340 deaths were caused by intimate partner violence—making up 14% of all homicides. 70% of these deaths were females and 30% were males.

In the United States, firearms have played a role in domestic violence. Compared to other nations, the United States is the number one country for owning guns in the world. According to the National Coalition Against Domestic Violence (NCADV), there has been a rise of 500% of death when a firearm is present during domestic violence.

==== Dating violence ====
Dating violence is often a precursor to domestic violence. 22% of high school girls and 32% of college women experienced dating violence in a 2000 study. 20.6% of women experienced two or more types of dating violence and 8.3% of women experienced rape, stalking or physical aggression while dating. The levels of dating violence against men has not been investigated to the same extent.

==== Stalking ====
According to the Centers for Disease Control National Intimate Partner Violence Survey results of 2010, 1 in 6 women (15.2%) have been stalked during their lifetime, compared to 1 in 19 men (5.7%). Additionally, 1 in 3 bisexual women (37%) and 1 in 6 heterosexual women (16%) have experienced stalking victimization in their lifetime during which they felt very fearful or believed that they or someone close to them would be harmed or killed.

== Socio-economic impacts ==
While domestic violence crosses all socio-economic classes, Intimate Terrorism (IT) is more prevalent among poor people. When evaluating situational couple violence, poor people, subject to greater strains, have the highest percentage of situational couple violence, which does not necessarily involve serious violence.

Regarding ethnicity, socio-economic standing and other factors often have more to do with rates of domestic violence. When comparing the African American population to European Americans by socio-economic class, the rates of domestic violence are roughly the same. Since there are more poor African Americans, though, there is a higher incidence of domestic violence overall. It is not possible to evaluate the rate of domestic violence by ethnicity alone, because of the variability of cultural, economic and historical influences and the forms of domestic violence (situational couple violence, intimate terrorism) affecting each population of people.

== Mental Health impacts ==
Domestic Violence is closely linked to mental health outcomes. In research done by Mazza et al. (2021), domestic violence was described as a recurring cycle that often leads to an increase in depression and other mental health disorders. This, in turn, tends to heighten the victim's vulnerability to further abuse. This study emphasizes the importance of addressing the psychological dimensions of abuse through comprehensive treatment as well as support services.

Similarly, a study called Deconstructing Stigma: Domestic Violence, Trauma, and Mental Health Support (2025), found that 20% percent of survivors will develop a mental health condition following abuse, including depression, anxiety, post-traumatic stress disorder, and substance abuse disorders. These studies highlight the importance of having trauma-informed care and sensitive interventions to break the cycle of abuse.

=== Effects on children ===
Up to 10 to 20% children in the United States witness abuse of a parent or caregiver annually. As a result, they are more likely to experience neglect or abuse, less likely to succeed at school, have poor problem-solving skills, subject to higher incidence of emotional and behavioral problems, and more likely to tolerate violence in their adult relationships. In the wake of domestic violence, parental psychopathology can further compromise the quality of parenting, and in turn, increase the risk for the child's developing emotional and behavioral difficulties if mental health care is not sought.

In a study done by Bhuller et al. (2024), it was found that children of domestic violence victims experience increased mental health visits, around 19% higher than children who are unexposed to this type of violence. Domestic violence also contributes to higher divorce rates, which have long lasting impacts on the children and families of the victims.

=== Homelessness ===
According to the authors of "Housing Problems and Domestic Violence," 38% of domestic violence victims will become homeless in their lifetime. Domestic violence is the direct cause of homelessness for over half of all homeless women in the United States. According to the U.S. Department of Housing and Urban Development, domestic violence is the third leading cause of homelessness among families.

=== Economic impacts ===
Economic abuse can occur across all socio-economic levels.

The National Coalition Against Domestic Violence in the United States reports that:

- 25% - 50% of victims of abuse from a partner have lost their job due to domestic violence.
- 35% - 56% of victims of domestic violence are harassed at work by their partners.
- More than 1.75 million workdays are lost each year to domestic violence. Lost productivity due to missed workdays and decreased productivity, with increased health and safety costs, results in a loss of $3 to $5 billion each year.

The Centers for Disease Control has released that the medical care, mental health services, and lost productivity cost of intimate partner violence was an estimated $8.3 billion in 2003 dollars for women alone.

== Religion ==
One 2004 study by William Bradford Wilcox examined the relationship between religious affiliation, church attendance, and domestic violence, using data on wives' reports of spousal violence from three national United States surveys conducted between 1992 and 1994. The study found that the lowest reported rates of domestic violence occurred among active conservative Protestants (2.8% of husbands committed domestic violence), followed by those who were religiously unaffiliated (3.2%), nominal mainline Protestants (3.9%), active mainline Protestants (5.4%), and nominal conservative Protestants (7.2%).

Overall (including both nominal and active members), the rates among conservative Protestants and mainline Protestants were 4.8% and 4.3%, respectively. Examining Wilcox's study, Van Leewen finds that the parenting style of conservative Protestant fathers is characterized by features which have been linked to positive outcomes among children and adolescents, (Note: "He concludes that conservative Protestant fathers' neotraditional parenting style seems to be closer to the authoritative style—characterized by moderately high levels of parental control and high levels of parental supportiveness—that has been linked to positive outcomes among children and adolescents.") that there is no evidence that gender-traditionalist ideology of the "soft patriarchal" kind is a strong predictor of domestic physical abuse, (Note: 'The upshot is that we have no evidence so far that a gender-traditionalist ideology—at least of the soft patriarchal variety—is a strong predictor of domestic physical abuse.') and that "gender hierarchicalist males" who are frequent and active church members function positively in the domestic environment. (Note: "Gender hierarchicalist males—at least those who have frequent and active church involvement—turn out, on average, to be better men than their theories: more often than not, they are functional egalitarians, and the rhetoric of male headship may actually be functioning as a covert plea for greater male responsibility and nurturant involvement on the home front.")

Another 2007 study by Christopher G. Ellison suggested that "religious involvement, specifically church attendance, protects against domestic violence, and this protective effect is stronger for African American men and women and for Hispanic men, groups that, for a variety of reasons, experience elevated risk for this type of violence."

== History ==
Prior to the mid-1800s, most legal systems implicitly accepted wife beating as a valid exercise of a husband's authority over his wife. One exception, however, was the 1641 Body of Liberties of the Massachusetts Bay colonists, which declared that a married woman should be "free from bodilie correction or stripes by her husband."

Political agitation during the 19th century led to changes in both popular opinion and legislation regarding domestic violence within the United Kingdom and the United States. In 1850, Tennessee became the first state in the United States to explicitly outlaw wife beating. Other states soon followed suit.

In 1878, the Matrimonial Causes Act made it possible for women in the UK to seek separations from abusive husbands. By the end of the 1870s, most courts in the United States were uniformly opposed to the right of husbands to physically discipline their wives. By the early 20th century, it was common for the police to intervene in cases of domestic violence in the United States, but arrests remained rare. Wife beating was made illegal in all states of the United States by 1920.

Modern attention to domestic violence began in the women's movement of the 1970s, particularly within feminism and women's rights, as concern about wives being beaten by their husbands gained attention. The first known use of the expression "domestic violence" in a modern context, meaning "spouse abuse, violence in the home" was in 1973. With the rise of the men's movement of the 1990s, the problem of domestic violence against men has also gained significant attention.

The Thurman lawsuit (Thurman v. City of Torrington, DC, 595 F.Supp. 1521 (1985)) brought about sweeping national reform of domestic violence laws, including the "Thurman Law" (aka the Family Violence Prevention and Response Act) instituted in Connecticut in 1986, making domestic violence an automatically arrestable offense, even if the victim does not wish to press charges.

Attention to violence against men began in the late 1980s.

Congress designated October as Domestic Violence Awareness Month in 1989. Such legislation has passed every year since with the National Coalition Against Domestic Violence providing key leadership.

Recent legal scholarship argues that the traditional narrative surrounding domestic violence, that judges ignored or shielded wife beaters behind the veil of marital privacy, is questionable. Rather, judges would routinely intervene on behalf of battered women in order to protect victims and reinforce gender norms by punishing men for "failing to conform to appropriate husbandly behavior." On the other hand, women accused of beating their husbands were not punished as severely and were even sometimes applauded by judges for "disciplining" their husbands.

== Prevalence ==
Several National studies consistently show that domestic violence remains a widespread issue in the United States. It is estimated that one in four women will experience domestic violence at some point during their lives, which is why it is amongst the most common forms of gender based violence in the United States. Prevalence will vary due to several different circumstantial issues like social isolation, access to healthcare, poverty, and housing instability (Ballard Brief, 2025). All of these contribute to hyper vulnerability, and they affect many marginalized groups. The prevalence of domestic violence can also be shaped by intergenerational patterns, meaning that children who grow up with such violence are more likely to perpetrate that same violence in future intimate relationships (Ballard Brief, 2025).

== The Cycle Of Abuse ==
Abusive Relationships exhibit a pattern known as the cycle of domestic violence. This cycle is why victims have a difficult time leaving their abusers.

- First there is the tension building stage where the victim feels like they have to be cautious around the abuser as to not upset them.
- Second there is the abusive incident. This is a violent incident that occurs between the abuser and victim including, physical, emotional, or sexual abuse.
- And lastly there is the honeymoon phase where the abuser attempts to make up for what they have done by apologizing, gifting things to the victim, and promising not to hurt them again. These are all attempts to get the victim to stay in the relationship.

== Early Indicators and Dating Violence ==
Adolescent relationship violence is an early indicator of possible future domestic abuse. Matud (2007) demonstrates that dating violence in youth often mirrors adult patterns of power imbalance and control issues. Gender norms and the normalization of aggression in youth relationships are also contributing factors to intimate partner violence down the line. Early education and intervention programs are crucial for potentially reducing aggressive behaviors in later adult relationships. Research that has been done in this area further suggests that harmful relationship patterns form during adolescence and can solidify in adult life, which is why early intervention is crucial. Programs that emphasize open communication and conflict resolution skills mitigate some of these risks by addressing the behavior early on. Educators and Policymakers may help prevent the developmental pathways that lead to domestic violence in adult life.

== Public Perception of Intimate Partner Violence ==
In a study conducted by Groggel and Rojas (2023) it was found that American public perceptions of intimate partner violence often vary due to contextual factors like the presence of a firearm or the race of the victim and the abuser. The participants in this study were less likely to support restricting gun ownership by abusers in cases where it involved black victims. This study demonstrated how racial bias can influence public concern and perceived severity in cases of domestic violence. The findings of this study suggest that stereotypes often shape how the public views victims and if they are "worthy" of intervention. This study also highlights how radicalized attitudes indirectly affect policy preferences. The biases found in these studies contribute to unequal support for domestic violence victims and contribute to inconsistent accountability for the abusers.

== Law ==
Victims of domestic violence are offered legal remedies that are both civil and criminal in nature.

- Criminal law remedies include the criminal prosecution of the offender, and possible restraints on the offender's behavior during periods of pretrial release or as part of a criminal sentence.
- Civil law remedies include the possibility of obtaining a protection order.

These remedies are not exclusive, meaning that a victim may seek both the criminal prosecution of the offender and also petition for civil remedies.

People who perpetrate acts of domestic violence are subject to criminal prosecution. Prosecution most often occurs under assault and battery laws. Perpetrators of domestic violence can be charged under general statutes, but most states have also enacted specific statutes that specifically criminalize acts of domestic violence. For example, under the South Carolina code, the crime of "Criminal domestic violence" states that "it is unlawful to: (1) cause physical harm or injury to a person's own household member; or (2) offer or attempt to cause physical harm or injury to a person's own household member with apparent present ability under circumstances reasonably creating fear of imminent peril." If aggravated circumstances are present, people can be charged with the crime of "Criminal domestic violence of a high and aggravated nature."

Other possible criminal charges may be brought based upon the facts of the offense, potentially including charges such as harassment, menacing or false imprisonment.

Acts of domestic violence can have a significant impact on Child custody laws in the United States litigation, most notably when an act of domestic violence is committed in the presence of the minor child. A parent with a history of domestic violence may be at a significant disadvantage in a custody case, even if the domestic violence was not directed at the other parent.

Certain laws indirectly impact domestic abuse survivors. A study commissioned by the ACLU of two cities in New York found that local nuisance ordinances, which penalize tenants and property owners based on criminal or police activity on a property, may have the unintended consequence of victims of domestic abuse being evicted and/or deterred from reporting abuse. In a study of four cities in Cuyahoga County, Ohio found survivors of domestic violence were disproportionately likely to receive a nuisance notification.

The lockdowns that were part of the 2020 coronavirus response may have indirectly contributed to an increase in domestic violence. Domestic violence calls to police within New York state, for example, increased by 15–20% in March 2020.

=== Violence Against Women Acts ===
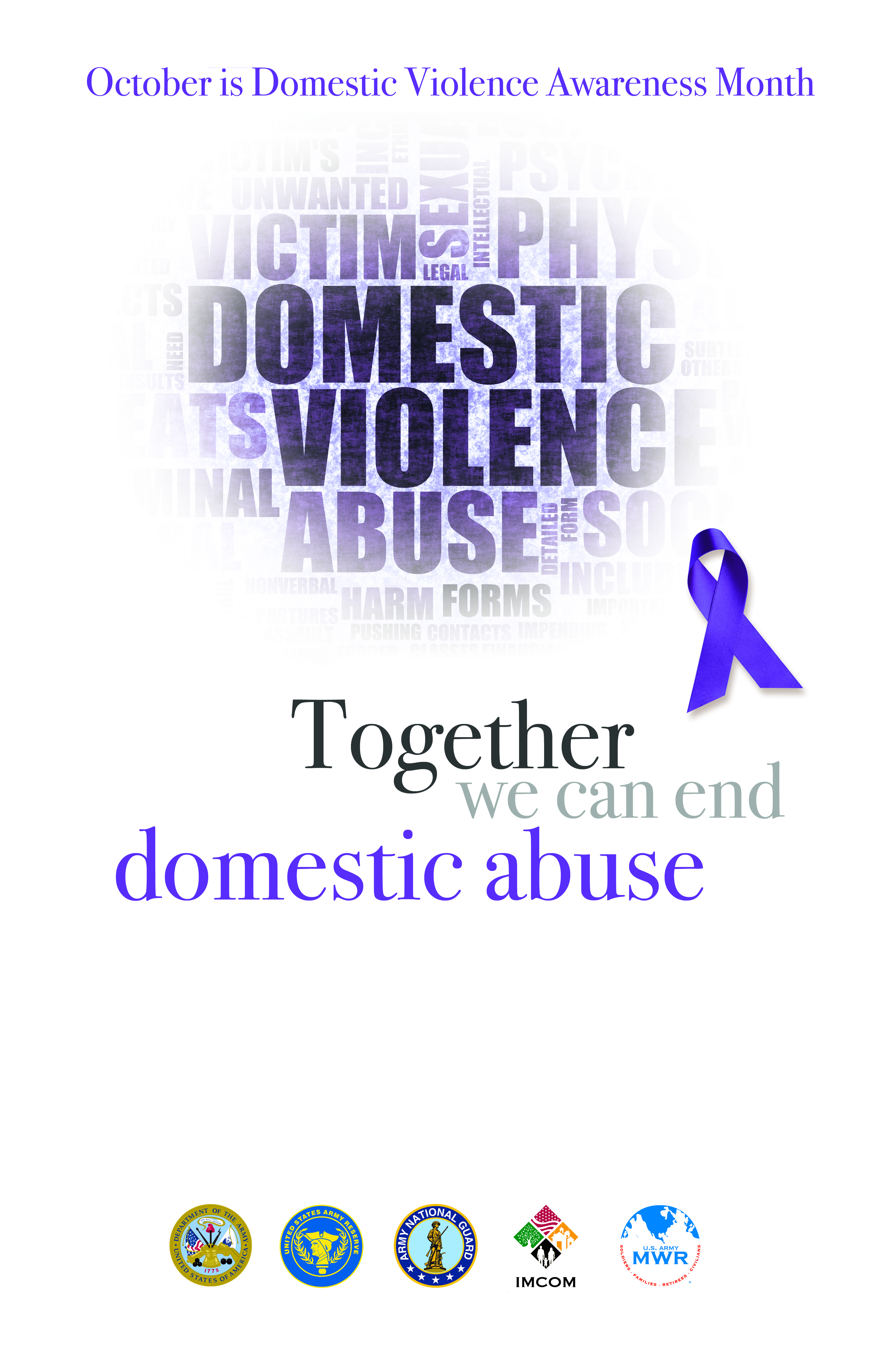
October is observed as Domestic Violence Awareness Month (DVAM) in the United States. This poster was issued by various branches of the United States military to educate and prevent domestic abuse.

The Violence Against Women Act (VAWA) was originally passed in 1994, and reauthorized in 2005, 2013, and 2022. These federal laws work to end domestic violence, sexual assault, dating violence, and stalking through the creation of new programs and legislation within the Department of Justice and Health and Human Services. Along with the passage of provisions to legislation, the Office on Violence Against Women came to fruition in 1995 under the Department of Justice of the United States to continue efforts that would protect women. The primary role of the division was to evaluate and improve outcomes for domestic violence survivors through tackling related issues like housing insecurity. One of the contributions of the OVAW was the introduction of federal grants to incentivize agencies to help women in need. The VAWA intensified investigations and prosecutions of individuals involved in domestic abuse cases and it decreased the number of occurrences. The law helped victim advocates and government agencies work together, created prevention and victim support programs, and resulted in new punishments for certain violent crimes, which by 2005 resulted in:

- 49.8% reduction of non-fatal, violent victimizations committed by intimate partners.
- In the first six years, an estimated $14.8 billion in net averted social costs.
- 51% increase in reporting of domestic violence and 18% increase in National Domestic Violence Hotline calls each year, evidence that as victims become aware of remedies, they break the code of silence.

United States v. Morrison, 529 U.S. 598 (2000), is a U.S. Supreme Court decision that held that parts of the Violence Against Women Act of 1994 were unconstitutional because they exceeded the powers granted to the US Congress under the Commerce Clause and the Fourteenth Amendment's Equal Protection Clause. Along with United States v. Lopez (1995), it was part of a series of Rehnquist Court cases that limited Congress's powers under the Commerce Clause. The Court's 5–4 decision in United States v. Morrison invalidated the section of the Violence Against Women Act of 1994 that gave victims of gender-motivated violence the right to sue their attackers in federal court. Chief Justice Rehnquist, writing for the majority, held that Congress lacked authority, under either the Commerce Clause or the Fourteenth Amendment, to enact that provision. However, the Act's program funding remained unaffected.

In 2013 additional facets were added to VAWA: new provisions for grant funding; allowing authorization to Native American Tribes to enforce domestic violence laws; and amendments to the Victims of Trafficking and Violence Protection Act of 2000.

In 2022 VAWA funding was reauthorized to include the Ensuring Forensic Health Care for all Act (EFCA) to fund support for generalist forensic nurse training.

Also in 2022, VAWA was amended to include Native Hawaiian survivors of gender-based violence and Native Hawaiian organizations in grant funding.

In the 2024 U.S. Supreme Court case United States v. Rahimi, the U.S. Supreme Court, in an 8-1 ruling, upheld VAWA’s domestic violence restraining order which restricts firearm possession for people convicted of domestic abuse.

=== Family Violence Prevention and Services Act ===
The Family Violence Prevention and Services Act (FVPSA), first authorized as part of the Child Abuse Amendments of 1984 (PL 98–457), provides federal funding to help victims of domestic violence and their dependent children by providing shelter and related help, offering violence prevention programs, and improving how service agencies work together in communities.

- Formula Grants. This money helps states, territories, and tribes create and support programs that work to help victims and prevent family violence. The amount of money is determined by a formula based partly on population. The states, territories, and tribes distribute the money to thousands of domestic violence shelters and programs.
- The 24-hour, confidential, toll-free National Domestic Violence Hotline—available since February 1996—provides support, information, referrals, safety planning, and crisis intervention in more than 200 languages to hundreds of thousands of domestic violence victims each year.
- The Domestic Violence Prevention Enhancement and Leadership Through Alliances (DELTA) Program teaches people ways to prevent violence.

=== Domestic Violence Prevention Enhancement and Leadership Through Alliances (DELTA) ===
The DELTA program, funded by Centers for Disease Control and Prevention (CDC), works towards preventing Intimate Partner Violence (IPV) in certain funded communities. The way that the DELTA program works towards prevention is by understanding factors that influence violence and then focusing on how to prevent these factors. This is done by using a social ecological model which illustrates the connection between Individual, Relationship, Community, and Societal factors that influence violence.

=== Domestic Violence Offender Gun Ban ===
The Domestic Violence Offender Gun Ban, also known as the Lautenberg Amendment after its supporter Senator Frank Lautenberg, is a United States federal law enacted in 1996 to ban firearms and ammunitions to individuals convicted of misdemeanor domestic violence, or who are under a restraining (protection) order for domestic abuse in all 50 states.

This law has been tested but supported in federal court with the case United States v. Emerson (No. 99-10331) (5th Cir. 2001). See also U.S. v. Emerson, 231 Fed. Appx. 349 (5th Cir. 2007) (Same defendant seeking review of judgment). The case involved a challenge to the Constitutionality of 18 U.S.C. § 922(g)(8)(C)(ii), a federal statute that prohibited the transportation of firearms or ammunition in interstate commerce by persons subject to a court order that, by its explicit terms, prohibits the use of physical force against an intimate partner or child. Emerson does not address the portion of the Lautenberg Amendment involving conviction for misdemeanor domestic violence. It was initially overturned in 1999 for being unconstitutional, but that case was reversed upon appeal in 2001.

The case Gillespie v. City of Indianapolis, Indiana, 185 F.3d 693 (7th Cir. 1999) also challenged this law, and the case was rejected. The ex post facto aspects of the law were challenged with:

- United States v. Brady, 26 F.3d 282 (2nd Cir.), cert. denied, 115 S.Ct. 246 (1994) (denying ex post facto challenge to a 922(g)(1) conviction) and
- United States v. Waters, 23 F.3d 29 (2nd Cir. 1994) (ex post facto based challenge to a 922(g)(4) conviction).

Both of the challenges were denied.

Likewise this law was invoked in United States v. Jardee where it was ruled that the threat of being subjected to the gun ban did not turn an otherwise "petty" crime into a "serious" one requiring a jury trial.

In United States vs Chovan (2013), the United States Court of Appeals for the Ninth Circuit ruled that the Lautenberg amendment is constitutional. Chovan claimed that his civil rights had been restored due to California law, but according to federal law, his rights had never been restored. The court also stated that a person cannot have their civil rights restored if they were never taken away in the first place since the Lautenberg amendment does not take away a person’s right to vote or be on a jury.

In United States v. Hayes (2009), the Supreme Court held that the predicate offense does not need to include a domestic relationship as an element, so long as a domestic relationship did in fact exist between the perpetrator and the victim. United States v. Castleman (2014) challenged the application of the law to misdemeanor convictions which did not involve "the use or attempted use of physical force". In a 9–0 decision, the United States Supreme Court held that Castleman's conviction of "misdemeanor domestic assault" did qualify as a "misdemeanor crime of domestic violence" under Tennessee state law. Specifically holding that the ""physical force" requirement is satisfied by the degree of force that supports a common-law battery conviction — namely, offensive touching", thereby preventing him from possession of firearms. Most recently, the Supreme Court in Voisine v. United States, 579 U.S. ___ (2016), decided that the Domestic Violence Offender Gun Ban in U.S. federal law extends to those convicted of reckless domestic violence.

=== Bipartisan Safer Communities Act ===
The Bipartisan Safer Communities Act was signed into law on June 25, 2022. This federal legislation significantly narrows the boyfriend loophole, denying access to firearms for five years to people convicted of violence in dating relationships. However, this restriction does not apply to those who only have restraining orders.

=== Town of Castle Rock v. Gonzales (2005) ===
Town of Castle Rock v. Gonzales is a 2005 United States Supreme Court case in which the Court ruled, 7–2, that a town and its police department could not be sued under 42 U.S.C. § 1983 for failing to enforce a restraining order, which had led to the murders of a woman's three children by her estranged husband. However, regarding this case, the Inter-American Commission on Human Rights found that the United States "failed to act with due diligence" to protect Jessica and her daughters Leslie, Katheryn, and Rebecca Gonzales from domestic violence, "which violated the state's obligation not to discriminate and to provide for equal protection before the law." The Commission further held that "the failure of the United States to adequately organize its state structure to protect [Leslie, Katheryn, and Rebecca] from domestic violence was discriminatory and constituted a violation of their right to life."

=== Voisine v. United States (2016) ===
Voisine v. United States, 579 U.S. 686 (2016), was a United States Supreme Court case in which the Court held that the Domestic Violence Offender Gun Ban in U.S. federal law extends to those convicted of reckless domestic violence. The court reached its judgment in a 6–2 majority.

=== United States v. Rahimi (2024) ===
United States v. Rahimi 602 U.S. ___ (2024) was a United States Supreme Court case regarding the Second Amendment to the United States Constitution and whether it confers the government's ability to prohibit firearm possession by a person with a civil domestic violence restraining order in the absence of a corresponding criminal domestic violence conviction or charge.

Domestic violence protective orders related to bans on possessing a firearm became enacted by the 1968 Gun Control Act. However, the federal law which enforced the restraining order in question was the 1994 Violence Against Women Act.

On June 21, 2024, the Supreme Court ruled 8–1 with the government, upholding the ability to temporarily restrict individuals deemed to be a physical threat from gun possession which was granted through the 1994 law.

=== State law ===
==== California ====
In California, depending on the circumstances of the case and the perpetrator's criminal record, the crime of domestic violence may be charged as either a felony or a misdemeanor.

If the victim's injuries are minor, such as bruises or scratches, and the perpetrator has no prior record, then the perpetrator will likely be charged with a misdemeanor, under California Penal Code, Sec. 243(e)(1).

If the injuries are serious, or it is deemed that there was "great bodily injury" as defined by state law, or if the perpetrator has a prior criminal record, then it will more likely be charged as a felony under California Penal Code, Sec. 273.5, Corporal Injury on a Spouse or Cohabitant.

==== Connecticut ====
The Thurman lawsuit (Thurman v. City of Torrington, DC, 595 F.Supp. 1521 (1985)) brought about sweeping national reform of domestic violence laws, including the "Thurman Law" (aka the Family Violence Prevention and Response Act) instituted in Connecticut in 1986, making domestic violence an automatically arrestable offense, even if the victim does not wish to press charges.

Jennifers' Law is a law of Connecticut that expands the definition of domestic violence to include "coercive control". The law is named for two women, both victims of domestic violence: Jennifer Farber Dulos and Jennifer Magnano. It became a law in 2021.

==== Florida ====
Weiand v. State was a landmark Florida Supreme Court case that took place in March 1999. In this historic case, the state's Supreme Court granted Florida citizens the ability to rely upon battered spouse syndrome as a defense in killing their abuser. While the decision is effective for anyone who is in an abusive situation, the majority of people that would take advantage of this defense are women since they are generally abused more than men. In this notable instance of an attempted defense using battered spouse syndrome, referred to as battered woman syndrome, Florida resident Kathleen Weiand shot and killed her husband Todd Weiand. She used the battered woman syndrome in her defense and the defense expert agreed that she was suffering from the syndrome. However, the jury rejected her defense and Kathleen was sentenced to 18 years in prison for second degree murder. Kathleen appealed, eventually reaching Florida's Supreme Court who regarded her case as high priority. Ultimately, the Court overturned the ruling, in favor of Kathleen Weiand.

==== North Dakota ====
State v. Leidholm, Supreme Court of North Dakota, 334 N.W.2d 811 (1983), is a criminal law case distinguishing the subjective and objective standard of reasonableness in a case where a battered woman used self-protection as a defense. Janice Leidholm had killed her husband near Washburn, North Dakota and claimed self defense. The case clarifies between the defenses of justification and excuse. The case overturned Janice Leidholm’s prior conviction regarding her husband’s death.

== Legal Solutions ==
=== Law Enforcement ===
In the 1970s, it was widely believed that domestic disturbance calls were the most dangerous type for responding officers, who arrive to a highly emotionally charged situation. This belief was based on FBI statistics which turned out to be flawed, in that they grouped all types of disturbances together with domestic disturbances, such as brawls at a bar. Subsequent statistics and analysis have shown this belief to be false.

Statistics on incidents of domestic violence, published in the late 1970s, helped raise public awareness of the problem and increase activism. A study published in 1976 by the Police Foundation found that the police had intervened at least once in the previous two years in 85% of spouse homicides. In the late 1970s and early 1980s, feminists and battered women's advocacy groups were calling on police to take domestic violence more seriously and change intervention strategies. In some instances, these groups took legal action against police departments, including Los Angeles's, Oakland, California's and New York City's, to get them to make arrests in domestic violence cases. They claimed that police assigned low priority to domestic disturbance calls.

The Minneapolis Domestic Violence Experiment was a study done in 1981–1982, led by Lawrence W. Sherman, to evaluate the effectiveness of various police responses to domestic violence calls in Minneapolis, Minnesota, including sending the abuser away for eight hours, giving advice and mediation for disputes, and making an arrest. Arrest was found to be the most effective police response. The study found that arrest reduced the rate by half of re-offending against the same victim within the following six months. The results of the study received a great deal of attention from the news media, including The New York Times and prime-time news coverage on television.

Many U.S. police departments responded to the study, adopting a mandatory arrest policy for spousal violence cases with probable cause. By 2005, 23 states and the District of Columbia had enacted mandatory arrest for domestic assault, without warrant, given that the officer has probable cause and regardless of whether or not the officer witnessed the crime. The Minneapolis study also influenced policy in other countries, including New Zealand, which adopted a pro-arrest policy for domestic violence cases.

However, the study was subject of much criticism, with concerns about its methodology, as well as its conclusions. The Minneapolis study was replicated in several other cities, beginning in 1986, with some of these studies having different results; one of which being the fact that the deterrent effect observed in the Minneapolis experiment was largely localized. In the replication studies which were far more broad and methodologically sound in both size and scope, arrest seemed to help in the short run in certain cases, but those arrested experienced double the rate of violence over the course of one year.

Each agency and jurisdiction within the United States has its own Standard Operating Procedures (SOP) when it comes to responding and handling domestic calls. Generally, it has been accepted that if the understood victim has visible (and recent) marks of abuse, the suspect is arrested and charged with the appropriate crime. However, that is a guideline and not a rule. Like any other call, domestic abuse lies in a gray area. Law enforcement officers have several things to consider when making a warrantless arrest:

- Are there signs of physical abuse?
- Were there witnesses?
- Is it recent?
- Was the victim assaulted by the alleged suspect?
- Who is the primary aggressor?
- Could the victim be lying?
- Could the suspect be lying?

Along with protecting the victim, law enforcement officers have to ensure that the alleged abusers' rights are not violated. Many times in cases of mutual combatants, it is departmental policy that both parties be arrested and the court system can establish truth at a later date. In some areas of the nation, this mutual combatant philosophy is being replaced by the primary abuser philosophy in which case if both parties have physical injuries, the law enforcement officer determines who the primary aggressor is and only arrests that one. This philosophy started gaining momentum when different government/private agencies started researching the effects. It was found that when both parties are arrested, it had an adverse effect on the victim, leading to decreased faith in law enforcement. As a result some 22 US states now have primary aggressor laws. A study of incidents in which both parties were arrested found that such cases were more likely to involve unmarried white women and drugs and alcohol.

=== Federal probation and supervised release for domestic violence offenders ===
The United States federal probation and supervised release law:

- Requires first-time domestic violence offenders convicted of domestic violence crimes to attend court-approved non-profit offender rehabilitation programs within a 50-mile radius of the individual's legal residence.
- Makes probation mandatory for first-time domestic violence offenders not sentenced to a term of imprisonment.

=== Asylum for victims of domestic violence ===
In 2014 the Board of Immigration Appeals, America's highest immigration court, found for the first time that women who are victims of severe domestic violence in their home countries can be eligible for asylum in the United States. However, this ruling was in the case of a woman from Guatemala and thus applies only to women from Guatemala.

=== Civil legal aid services ===
Domestic violence can be addressed through seeking civil legal aid. Various types of organizations are involved in the civil legal aid sector, including nonprofit or court-related service organizations such as legal self-help centers; private professional service organizations such as law firms; professional membership organizations such as the American Bar Association; and educational service organizations such as law school student clinics. Specifically in California, starting in 2008, “the Judicial Council adopted California Rules of Court, rule 10.960, which states that court-based self-help centers are a core function of the California courts.” These centers can help victims of domestic violence by helping them seek protection. Common support methods in legal aid include triaging, form-filling, and informational workshops. Each activity plays an essential role: triage assesses litigants' needs and directs them to the appropriate resources, form-filling helps individuals better prepare for court hearings, and informational workshops raise awareness and answer frequently asked questions. In cases of domestic violence, these services are crucial for helping victims complete necessary legal documents such as domestic violence restraining orders and directing them to specific organizations that can provide further assistance.

== State due diligence ==
International law requires that States exercise due diligence to reduce domestic violence and, when violations occur, to provide effective investigation and redress to victims. In 2011, Rashida Manjoo, the United Nations Special Rapporteur on Violence Against Women, urged the United States to "[e]xplore more uniform remedies for victims of domestic violence," "[r]e-evaluate existing mechanisms at federal, state, local, and tribal levels for protecting victims and punishing offenders," "[e]stablish meaningful standards for enforcement of protection orders," and "[i]nitiate more public education campaigns." After the Supreme Court of the United States held in Town of Castle Rock v. Gonzales (2005) that Jessica Lenahan-Gonzales, a victim of domestic violence, had no constitutional right to the enforcement of her restraining order, the Inter-American Commission on Human Rights found that the United States "failed to act with due diligence" to protect Jessica and her daughters Leslie, Katheryn, and Rebecca Gonzales from domestic violence, "which violated the state's obligation not to discriminate and to provide for equal protection before the law." The Commission further held that "the failure of the United States to adequately organize its state structure to protect [Leslie, Katheryn, and Rebecca] from domestic violence was discriminatory and constituted a violation of their right to life."

=== Freedom from domestic violence resolution movement ===
Since 2011, thirty-two local governments in the United States have passed resolutions declaring freedom from domestic violence to be a fundamental human right, rooted in the recognition of governmental responsibility to ensure this right.

The following City, County, and Municipal Governments have passed resolutions recognizing that freedom from domestic violence is a fundamental human right:

- Cincinnati, OH (2011)
- Baltimore, MD (2012)
- Miami Springs, FL (2012)
- Prattville, AL (2012)
- Erie County, NY (2012)
- Albany County, NY (Legislature) (2012)
- Albany County, NY (Executive) (2012)
- Albany City, NY (2012)
- Miami-Dade County, FL (2012)
- Montgomery City and Montgomery County, AL (2012)
- Seattle, WA (2012)
- Washington, D.C. (2013)
- Travis County, TX (2014)
- Austin, TX (2014)
- Boston, MA (2014)
- Jacksonville, FL (2014)
- Chicago, IL (2014)
- Tompkins County, NY (Legislature) (2014)
- Ithaca (Town), NY (2014)
- Lansing (Town), NY (2015)
- Tompkins County, NY (Council of local governments) (2015)
- Cayuga Heights, NY (2015)
- Ithaca (City), NY (Legislature) (2015)
- Ithaca (City), NY (Executive) (2015)
- Laredo (City) and Webb County, TX (2015)
- State College, PA (Executive) (2015)
- Dallas (City), TX (2015)
- Iowa (City), IA (2016)
- Fall River, MA (2016)
- New Bedford, MA (2016)
- Beaver County, UT (2017)
- Berkeley, CA (2018)

Although the resolutions are not identical, most declare that freedom from domestic violence is a fundamental human right, and further resolve that the state and local governments should secure this human right on behalf of their citizens and should incorporate the resolution's principles into their policies and practices.

== Support organizations ==
=== Christian ===
A contributing factor to the disparity of responses to abuse is lack of training. Many Christian seminaries had not educated future church leaders about how to manage violence against women. Once pastors began receiving training, and announced their participation in domestic violence educational programs, they immediately began receiving visits from women church members who had been subject to violence.

The first Theological Education and Domestic Violence Conference, sponsored by the Center for the Prevention of Sexual and Domestic Violence, was held in 1985 to identify topics that should be covered in seminaries. When church leaders first encounter sexual and domestic violence, they need to know what community resources are available. They need to focus on ending the violence, rather than on keeping families together.

One of the Salvation Army's missions is working with victims of domestic abuse. They offer safe housing, therapy, and support.

=== National Coalition Against Domestic Violence ===
The National Coalition Against Domestic Violence, otherwise known as the NCADV, is a non-profit organization centered on creating a culture where domestic violence is not tolerated. The NCADV works toward this vision by promoting a society that empowers the victims and survivors of domestic violence and holds their abusers accountable. They work toward their goal of changing society to have a zero tolerance for domestic violence by effecting public policy, increasing understanding of the impact of domestic violence, and providing education and programs for victims.

The NCADV works with national organisations to push for policies and legislation that work to protect victims and survivors of domestic violence. They also offer programs for victims to assist them in rehabilitation such as The Cosmetic and Reconstructive Surgery Program. This program is offered to survivors and consists of plastic surgeons volunteering their services to assist survivors of domestic violence, who cannot afford plastic surgery, in removing their scars left by an abusive partner.

=== FreeFrom ===
FreeFrom is a nonprofit organization created to help survivors of intimate partner violence (IPV). FreeFrom determined that economic insecurity is the primary reason for staying in abusive relationships, and so it provides financial counseling to survivors, and lobbies for legislative reforms that will allow survivors to escape "financial imprisonment".

=== Domestic violence shelters ===
Domestic violence shelters are buildings, usually sets of apartments, that offer a place where victims of domestic violence can seek refuge from their abusers. To keep the abuser from finding the victim, the locations of these shelters are kept confidential. A rise in the building of shelters resulted from reforms in the 1980s and 1990s that restricted government support for women, coinciding with a period when women began to speak out against domestic violence. Reagan's presidency saw cuts to essential programs like Aid to Families with Dependent Children (AFDC), food stamps, medicare, housing aid subsidies, daycare, abortion, and family planning, exacerbating gender disparities and socioeconomic hardships, leading to the "feminization of poverty" with more women falling into impoverished conditions. Clinton's presidency continued these shifts, marked by the passage of the Personal Responsibility and Work Opportunity Reconciliation Act (PRWORA) in 1996, introducing welfare reform through Temporary Assistance for Needy Families (TANF), which disproportionately impacted unmarried mothers and posed significant risks by reducing welfare entitlements. The implementation of work requirements and time limits under TANF also further exacerbated the challenges faced by women experiencing domestic violence, making it difficult for them to access the support they needed to leave abusive situations and rebuild their lives. These shelters that started to form provided the victims with the basic living necessities including food. Some domestic violence shelters have room for victimized mothers to bring their children, therefore offering childcare as well. Although the length of time a person can stay in these shelters is limited, most shelters help victims in finding a permanent home, job, and other necessities one needs to start a new life. Domestic Violence shelters should also be able to refer its victims to other services such as legal help, counseling, support groups, employment programs, health services, and financial opportunities.

=== Hotlines ===
- The National Domestic Violence Hotline (1-800-799-7233 or 1-800-799-SAFE) is a 24-hour, confidential, toll-free hotline created through the Family Violence Prevention and Services Act. Hotline staff immediately connect the caller to a service provider in his or her area. Highly trained advocates provide support, information, referrals, safety planning, and crisis intervention in 200 languages to hundreds of thousands of domestic violence victims.
- Loveisrespect, National Teen Dating Abuse Helpline, launched February 8, 2007 by the National Domestic Violence Hotline, is a 24-hour national Web-based and telephone resource, created to help teens (ages 13–18) experiencing dating abuse, and is the only helpline in the country serving all 50 states, Puerto Rico and the Virgin Islands.

== Reduction programs ==
=== Community activism by men ===
Men's groups against domestic violence and forced rape, found around the world, take measures to reduce their use of violence. Typical activities include group discussions, education campaigns and rallies, work with violent men, and workshops in schools, prisons and workplaces. Actions are frequently conducted in collaboration with women's organizations that are involved in preventing violence against women and providing services to abused women. In the United States alone, there are over 100 such men's groups, many of which focus specifically on sexual violence. In San Jose, California, men and boys who have faced domestic abuse can attend support groups and workshops and receive counseling through Next Door Solutions to Domestic Violence (NDS).

=== State standards ===
US states use a variety of models in their Batterers Intervention Programs. A few states use the Domestic Abuse Intervention Project (Duluth Model), which was the first multi-disciplinary program designed to coordinate the actions of agencies dealing with domestic violence in Duluth, Minnesota, and was featured in a documentary (Power and Control: Domestic Violence in America).

== See also ==
- Uniform Child Abduction Prevention Act
- Honor killing in the United States

Legal remedies:

- Address confidentiality program, some states in the United States
- Injunction
- Restraining order

Organizations:

- AHA Foundation (Muslim women's rights in western countries)
- Futures Without Violence
- National Coalition Against Domestic Violence
- National Network to End Domestic Violence
- Peaceful Families Project (Muslim organization)
- Stop Abuse For Everyone, inclusive of all types of domestic violence victims: age, LBGT, gender, etc.
- Tahirih Justice Center
- Convicted Women Against Abuse

General:

- Crime in the United States
- Athletes and domestic violence
