= Liesl Jobson =

South African poet and musician

- Born: Durban, South Africa
- Education: University of the Witwatersrand (BMus, MA)
- Notable work: 100 Papers (2008); Ride the Tortoise (2013)
- Children: 2
- Website: Official website (2016 archive)

Liesl Jobson is a South African poet and short story and flash fiction writer. Her works center on identity, trauma, abuse, shame and motherhood, among other themes. She is primarily published in journals, magazines and short story anthologies, but has also published six books, including three children's books as part of Book Dash.

== Biography ==
Jobson was born in Durban, South Africa. In her childhood, she lived in Pinetown and Cape Town before her family relocated to New Canaan, Connecticut for 18 months before returning to Cape Town. While at New Canaan High School, she played flute in orchestra and was inspired for the first time to become a writer. She has a BMus and a Master of Arts in writing from the University of the Witwatersrand. By the time she started her Master's in the early 2000s, she had already published more than 60 of her stories and poems online. One of her professors suggested she anthologise them and submit the result as her dissertation. This later became 100 Papers, which she published through Botsotso Publishing in 2008. Her next book, a collection of poetry called View From An Escalator, was published in 2008 with a grant from the Centre for the Book. Her early jobs included a community journalist and a media officer and speechwriter. She has also taught music at schools such as Roedean School and Sacred Heart College.

Jobson placed first in the inaugural Inglis House Poetry Contest in 2003 and, in 2006, her anthology 100 Papers won the Ernst van Heerden Creative Writing Award from the University of the Witwatersrand. Jobson was a poetry editor for Mad Hatters' Review in 2005 and was a senior correspondent and deputy editor for BOOK SA around 2009. She was also a contributing editor to BooksLIVE around 2013 and headed the South African arm of Poetry International for many years. She also teaches poetry at South African Writers College. Her writing has been printed in a number of magazines and journals, including Aesthetica, Moondance, New Coin, Quick Fiction, The Southern Review, Chimurenga, Word Riot and The Common. She was a judge in the Short Sharp Stories competition for PEN South Africa in 2017.

Jobson's protagonists are mainly women, and themes present throughout her works include identity, trauma, women's sexuality, abuse, motherhood, divorce and friendship. Erinn Kelley of Literary Mama described her characters as "unwaveringly honest and relatable" and Jane Rosenthal of Mail & Guardian described her stories as "occupy[ing] a narrow, intense zone of personal relationships and personal sense of identity." Her 2013 publication Ride the Tortoise explored "the intersections between shame, bodies and women's physical vulnerability in the context of a society that is structured according to unequal gender relations." Michael Northen of Wordgathering praised her "portrayal of women under mental duress [as] a significant contribution to the growing field of disability literature."

== Personal life ==
Jobson married at 19 and later divorced. She has two children, a son and a daughter, from the marriage. She has since remarried.

Jobson is a bassoonist and has played with many orchestras, including the SABC Symphony Orchestra and the Bophuthatswana Chamber Orchestra, and played flute in the Soweto Police Band for two years. In 1991, she competed for the SABC Music Prize. She stopped playing for several years after her son's birth while suffering from postpartum depression.

== Awards ==
- 2003: Inglis House Poetry Contest from Wordgathering
- 2005: People Opposing Women Abuse Poetry Competition from POWA
- 2006: Ernst van Heerden Creative Writing Award for 100 Papers from the University of the Witwatersrand
- 2007: Faye Goldie Award from the South African Writers' Circle

Ride the Tortoise was long-listed for the Frank O'Connor International Short Story Award in 2013.

== Publications ==
- 2008: 100 papers (flash fiction) - Botsotso Publishing. ISBN 978-0-9814068-1-7
- 2008: View from an Escalator (poetry) - Botsotso Publishing. ISBN 978-0-9814068-3-1
- 2013: Ride the Tortoise (short stories) - Jacana Literary Foundation. ISBN 978-1-4314056-6-4
- 2014: A Fish and a Gift (children's book) - Book Dash. With Jesse Breytenbach and Andy Thesen. ISBN 978-0-9922357-8-9
- 2014: Together We're Strong: The Story of Albertina Sisulu (children's book) - Book Dash. With Alice Toich and Nazli Jacobs. ISBN 978-0-9922358-8-8
- 2015: Karabo's Question (children's book) - Book Dash. With Natalie Edwards and Marike Beyleveld. ISBN 978-1-928318-33-0

=== Selected anthologies ===
- 2003: "12 Anxieties for April 12" in Timbila 2003 : A Journal of Onion Skin Poetry, Timbila Poetry Project/Elim.
- 2007: In White Ink: Poems on Mothers and Motherhood (ed. Rishma Dunlop), Demeter Press. ISBN 978-1-5501448-4-0
- 2008: "Missive From Shakaland" in After Shocks: The Poetry of Recovery for Life-Shattering Events (ed. Tom Lombardo), Press 53. ISBN 978-0-9816354-0-8
- 2008: "Seven Saucy Smokelong Stories" in Open An Erotic Anthology by South African Women Writers (ed. Karin Schimke), Oshun. ISBN 978-1-7700757-2-6
- 2010: "The Exact Location of the Exit" in Home Away - 24 hours 24 cities 24 writers (ed. Louis Greenberg), Zebra Press. ISBN 978-1-7702207-2-0
- 2010: "You Pay for the View – Twenty Tips for Super Pics" in Touch: Stories of Contact by South African Writers (ed. Karina Magdalena Szczurek), Struik Publishers. ISBN 978-1-7702204-6-1
- 2010: "Nompumelelo Sinxoto’s Bed" in The Bed Book of Short Stories (eds. Lauri Kubuitsile, Joanne Hichens), Modjaji Books. ISBN 978-1-9203977-7-7
- 2011: "You Pay for the View – Twenty Tips for Super Pics" in The Edge of Things (ed. Arja Salafranca), Dye Hard Press. ISBN 978-0-620-49506-6
- 2012: "Boston Brown Bread" and "Soda Lakes" in Pangea: An Anthology of Stories from Around the Globe (eds. Indira Chandrasekhar, Rebecca Lloyd), Anthem Press. ISBN 9780857285225
- 2017: "Still Life in the Art Room" in The Right Way To Be Crippled & Naked: The Fiction of Disability (eds. Sheila Black, Michael Northen and Annabelle Hayse), Cinco Puntos Press. ISBN 978-1-941026-36-6
- 2024: In The Creative Arts: On Practice, Making & Meaning (eds. Michèle Betty, Sally-Ann Murray), Dryad Press. ISBN 978-0-7961131-0-8
