= Powa =

Powa may refer to:

- Phowa, a Buddhist meditation practice
- Powa Technologies, a technology company
- POWA, People Opposing Women Abuse, South African NGO
- "P.O.W.A.", 2017 song by M.I.A.
