= Athletes and domestic violence in the United States =

Domestic violence perpetrated by male athletes upon their intimate partners or family members is a serious crime that affects sports administration. In a 9 year span, there was a surplus of 50 domestic violence incidents perpetrated by NFL players, only 16 of them receiving disciplinary attention from the Commissioner of the sport. There have been instances of the NFL, National Collegiate Athletic Association (NCAA), National Basketball Association (NBA), and the sport of boxing employing and protecting athletes who have committed domestic violence, which presets a dilemma when their offending becomes public knowledge. There are many popular cases of domestic violence involving members of sporting leagues, due largely to the sport-centric culture of the United States and the impact that the media has on both the conviction of cases and the standard of punishment from the NFL commission.

== Background ==
Off the field, domestic violence can be found among both professional and collegiate athletes as a crime committed against those in their lives, especially intimate female partners. American football and other high contact sports are played and watched by millions of Americans, and there has been evidence of the violent nature of sports making its way into the personal lives of these athletes. There have been studies at professional and college levels, attempting to correlate the violence on field with the violence on field. Scholars have suggested that the violent behavior inherent in the football environment can be a potential accelerator or stimulator of domestic violence. In relation to this, major sports franchises are increasingly criticized for their lack of action in regard to domestic violence.

== American football ==
"Domestic abuse among professional athletes is not a new problem, but it became a nationally recognized issue when Baltimore Ravens football player Ray Rice assaulted his then-fiancée, now wife, [in 2014] and was only suspended from two NFL games." The incident took place in an elevator in a hotel, in which Rice knocked out his fiancée. The video was released by TMZ. Prior to the incident, the NFL’s conduct policy stated that players would be disciplined for domestic abuse offense, but gave no specifics, so the league was left scrambling to come up with an appropriate punishment for Rice. After receiving a great deal of criticism for the light suspension, NFL commissioner Roger Goodell created new rules for players who abuse a partner, saying the first offense would lead to a six-game suspension without pay and a second offense would lead to being kicked out of the league for at least a year.

The criminal behavior of football players has been studied more than that of other players in other sports. Because of the sport's intrinsically violent nature, one might suppose that football players are particularly prone to off-the-field violence. One of the NFL's biggest problems off the field is domestic violence, according to Jon Shuppe from NBC News; over the last 14 years as of 2014, there had been 87 arrests involving 80 football players. A survey of 252 nationally-reported criminal cases in one year that involved athletes found that about 14% (49) of the athletes involved were professional football players. This compared to about 7% (25) professional baseball players and about 6% (twenty-one) of professional basketball and ice hockey players. While this does not draw any specific causation of the violence, the survey is at least suggestive that professional athletes who play other sports besides football also break the law in significant numbers, amounting to perhaps dozens of high-profile incidents each year.

A contributing factor to domestic violence among football players may be that they are desensitized to physical conduct because it is a part of what they do all the time. Stanley Teitelbaum, a Ph.D Clinical Psychologist and author of Sports Heroes, Fallen Idols and Illusions and Disillusions, agrees with the previous statement by Mitch Abrams, saying, "They're (elite football players) trained to be very aggressive and somewhat violent on the field, that's the nature of the game and that’s how they become important players. And sometimes it's difficult for athletes to turn that off when they go back to their regular lives." Some players are raised in an environment where violence is used to resolve conflict. As one is raised in an environment that welcomes violence, their propensity to repeat what they've seen, or what has been done to them may increase. Adrian Peterson has said that he disciplined his son the way he was disciplined as a child, then went on to say that he would "never use a switch again" (in reference to accusations of disciplining his 4-year-old with a whip.) In almost every case, the domestic violence involves male athletes who play violent sports physically abusing wives or girlfriends. In 2010, starting running back Steve Jackson of the St. Louis Rams was accused of beating up his girlfriend while she was nine months pregnant with his child. His former girlfriend, Supriya Harris, said that Jackson “forcibly grabbed my arm, flung me against the door and repeatedly pushed me to the ground.” Jackson took Harris to the hospital and told her to tell the doctors she had fallen in the shower. Ten days later, she delivered their child, but the couple separated four months later after he threatened her again.

Yet it is not clear that athletes are any more involved in serious crime than the general population is. In a follow-up study, Blumstein and Benedict (1999) showed that 23% of the males in cities with a population of 250,000 or more are arrested for a serious crime at some point in their life. That compares with the 21.4% of NFL football players who had been arrested for something more serious than a minor crime as reported in Benedict’s earlier study (Benedict and Yaeger 1998). In fact, when Blumstein and Benedict compared NFL players with young men from similar racial backgrounds, they discovered that the arrest rates for NFL players were less than half that of the other group for crimes of domestic violence and nondomestic assaults.

Woods brings attention to issue of male entitlement, a topic that Benedict and Yaeger also shed light on. Some athletes develop a sense of entitlement as their fame grows. Whatever city they’re in, male athletes are surrounded by female groupies. The athletes often treat these women with disdain and yet are still tempted by their offers of sex.

== NCAA ==
A sensitive topic for many athletes is the apparent rise in violence against women among male athletes. Most men would be quick to say that they respect women and certainly don’t intend women harm. Here are some statistics from the National Coalition Against Violent Athletes on its website at ncava.org: A three-year study showed that while male student-athletes make up 3% of the population on college campuses, they account for 20% of sexual assaults and 35% of domestic assaults on college campuses. Athletes commit one in three college sexual assaults. The general population has a conviction rate of 80% for sexual assaults, while the rate for athletes is only 38%. These statistics were gathered from 107 cases of sexual assault reported at 30 Division I schools between 1991 and 1993. Critics of this study say the sample size was relatively small and was not controlled for the use of alcohol, the use of tobacco, and the man’s attitude toward women. Those three factors are the main predictors of a male’s inclination toward gender violence. More recent studies have corroborated the study by Crosset and colleagues, and one researcher concluded that “a disproportionate number of campus gang rapes involve fraternities or athlete groups.”

Due to the rising accounts of sexual assault on college campuses, the “It’s On Us” campaign was launched in 2014 by President Barack Obama. The campaigns goal is to raise awareness of sexual assault by inspiring people to realize that it is everyone’s responsibility to do something, no matter how big or small. Over 200 universities have partnered with the “It’s On Us” campaign along with sports organizations such as the NCAA. According to an article from the New York Times "The Big East Conference, which like the NCAA was a charter partner of It's on Us, had its lawyers brief the presidents of its 10 universities on developments in law and policy over the summer. At several universities, athletes produced public service announcements; DePaul enlisted the Chicago Police Department's Sexual Assault Task Force for athlete training, according to the conference."

== National Basketball Association ==
In September 2014 NBA commissioner Adam Silver said that his league will "take a fresh look" at its domestic violence procedures in the wake of the NFL's rash of incidents. Underscoring to the NBA Players Association ways to further educate players and provide programs to them and their families. "We learn from other leagues' experiences," Silver said. "We're studying everything that's been happening in the NFL. We're working with our players' association. We've been talking for several weeks and we're going to take a fresh look at everything we do." The NFL and Commissioner Roger Goodell has been criticized for punishments that were too slow or lenient for Ray Rice, Adrian Peterson and other players involved in issues of domestic violence brought to light in September 2014. Goodell aimed to implement new personal conduct policies by the Super Bowl. The NBA's collective bargaining agreement calls for a minimum 10-game suspension for a first offense of a player convicted of a violent felony, however nothing regarding misdemeanor domestic violence charges. Silver says that the NBA has in place, the appropriate mechanisms for discipline, but also acknowledged that it is his wish to continually revise and revisit the policy if need be. Silver also mentioned that "most importantly, it's education, and it's not just the players, but it's the players' families. That's what we're learning, too. We have to take these programs directly to the players' spouses, directly to their partners so that they're aware of places they can go to express concerns, whether they're anonymous hotlines, team executives, league executives. And we're consulting experts. There's a lot to be learned here. It's a societal problem; it's not one that's unique to sports." This proactive approach by Silver is surely helping the issue, but it does not diminish the fact that from 2010 to present, the NFL had an average arrest rate (for a population of 100,000) of approximately 2,466, followed by the NBA’s 2,157. Comparatively, professional baseball and ice hockey players clocked average arrest rates of 553 and 175, respectively, over the same period.

== Boxing ==
Neither the World Boxing Federation or the Nevada Athletics Commission have rules forbidding boxers to commit domestic violence or sexual assault. Floyd Mayweather Jr., the world's highest-paid athlete is arguably the face of the sport. Mayweather had been charged with domestic violence on more than one occasion, but rarely are they spoken of. Recently during the Floyd Mayweather Jr. vs. Manny Pacquiao fight ESPN and HBO’s Michelle Beadle and CNN reporter Rachel Nichols, both of whom have covered Mayweather’s history of domestic violence, tweeted that Mayweather’s camp had "banned" them from the MGM Grand Arena, preventing them from covering there for the respective media outlets. The first documented claim of domestic violence occurred in 2001. After Mayweather and Melissa Brim, the mother of his daughter Ayanna, got into an argument over child support, according to court documents, Mayweather swung open a car door that slammed her in the head, then he punched her three times in the face, leaving bruises. In 2003, Mayweather was at a nightclub at the Luxor in Las Vegas when he spotted two friends of Josie Harris, who was the mother of three of his children. According to the testimony, Mayweather hit them both announced after following them outside the club, then. Outside, he allegedly picked up and shook a female security guard; police issued him a citation. A month after beating Arturo Gatti Mayweather went to trial on a felony battery charge. The previous year, Josie Harris had angrily confronted Mayweather about another woman. In response, Harris told police, he repeatedly punched her, kicked her, and dragged her by her hair, cutting her face. “My babies’ father just beat me up,” she said when she called 911. According to Lauren Holters article, Mayweather then, in 2010 got into another argument with Josie Harris, in which he punched her on the top of and in the back of the head. He allegedly kicked her, pulled her hair, and tried to break her left arm. “I’m going to get someone to pour acid on you,” he also said, according to the police report. Zion, their 9-year-old son, gave police a voluntary statement about what he saw: “He was punching her and kicking her. He was punching her in the head and he was stomping on her sholder [sic].” When Harris yelled for the children to call the police, Mayweather threatened them with violence if they did, and a friend who had come with him blocked the way, according to police. But Zion’s brother Koraun escaped, “jumped the fence,” and made his way to the main security gate, where he told the guard to call the police and an ambulance. A doctor’s examination of Harris afterward showed bruises and a concussion. Floyd Mayweather, who made roughly $180 million from his bout with Manny Pacquiao, his domestic abuse charges however, remain a quieter issue in comparison to his money or his 48–0 undefeated record.

== Socioeconomics ==
The statistics do show that the NFL’s arrest rate for domestic violence is only half of the national average arrest rate. However, the socio-economic factor needs to be considered. While no arrest data broken down by income, BJS survey provided breakdowns for victimization rates. Benjamin Morris, the researcher and writer of FiveThirtyEight, found that the domestic violence victimization rate for people from households making $75,000 or more was 39% of the overall domestic violence victimization rate, and for women ages 20 to 34 it was less than 20%. Although it is impossible to compare directly to the relative NFL arrest rate with precision, at least it gives some benchmark to show that people with higher income levels generally tend to have lower rates of arrest for domestic violence. The rate of domestic violence among NFL players is higher than expected for their income level, which could suggest that these athletes are indeed more prone to domestic violence.

== See also ==
- Domestic violence in United States
- List of Major League Baseball players suspended for domestic violence
- National Football League player conduct policy
