= Domestic violence in South Korea =

Domestic violence in South Korea is the mental, physical, verbal or sexual abuses or crimes of violence committed towards a victim in a domestic setting of marital relations and cohabitation. Domestic violence describes violence towards a domestic partner, towards children and between siblings. According to the Domestic Violence Survey of South Korea in 2010, elder abuse was estimated to be 10%, physical abuse accounted for 2.2%, emotional abuse 9%, economic abuse 1.2%, and neglect 2.5%. Marital violence has been the most prevalent form of family violence in South Korea. One out of six couples in South Korea had more than one episode of physical violence from their spouse.

As a part of the culture of South Korea, marital violence is regarded as a private family issue, rather than a crime or social issues. Accordingly, 50% of Korean adults reported that they did not wish to call the police for an incidence of marital violence because "it is a family matter."

The Korean government claims to prioritize the elimination of gender-based stereotypes and violence. In 2018, the United Nations (UN) Committee on the Elimination of Discrimination Against Women (CEDAW) reported an increase in the governmental efforts to improve gender equality in South Korea, by protecting women's rights in employment, health, and education, and reducing violence against women. In 2009, the Korean government spent 27.1 billion Korean Won out of the national budget in the punishment and prevention of domestic and sexual violence.

== Definition ==
According to the government of the Republic of Korea, domestic violence crimes are defined as acts of assault, injury, abandonment, abuse, arrest, confinement, intimidation and so on between family members which inflict physical, mental or property damage. Domestic violence cases are treated as special cases in the investigation stage and the court procedure.

== Causes ==
=== Patriarchal regime ===
One of the predominant cause of domestic violence in the Republic of Korea is the presence of patriarchy in many domestic settings and patriarchal hegemony. The patrilineal house-head system (hojuje), which grants the succession rules to the paternal side of the family, was dominant in South Korea until the government abolished it in 2005. Gender roles enforced by patriarchal system grants men the superiority and the control over the family, which often leads them to use physical violence when conflicts occur at home. In 2008, laws regarding the family kinship register were legislated and the patrilineal succession ended. From that point, the Minister of Gender Equality and family guides for family education according to the Basic Plan of Health, which promotes equality and happiness.

"Women and dried pollock need to be beaten every three days for better taste" is an old saying that was common in South Korea in the 1960s when male violence against women was widely accepted.

Violence against women was present mainly under President Park Chung Hee's military dictatorship that enforced patriarchal hegemony, and women suffered from sexual abuse, prostitution, and physical abuse in the workplace. The victims of these crimes were unable to complain or request assistance because they were not given equal rights to men. State violence became mostly evident after the Puch’ŏn Police Sex Torture Case in 1986. In this case, a labor activist student from Seoul National University was arrested by authorities, without a warrant, for using false resident identification to be able to work for the manufacturing industry. During her 10-day interrogation, she was sexually abused and tortured by police officers. The case raised concerns and awareness about state gender violence among the Korean society and triggered a related protest organized by The Korean Women's Association United (KWAU) and local NGOs.

In the Family and Changing Gender Roles Survey by the International Social Survey Programme in 2002, on a scale of 1 to 5, South Korea scored a high 3.2 due to the respondents' support in the statement,"It is a man's job to earn money, and a woman's job is to look after home and family." According to the United Nations Development Programme's Gender Empowerment Measure (GEM), South Korea ranked 68th out of 100 nations in women's participation in important political and economic policy-making decisions, emphasizing men dominance in all fields of the country. The tradition of patriarchy is often deepened in the South Korean culture, with popular old Korean sayings, such as "Dried fish and women are better after they are beaten," with common view on women as a commodity of a household or a kitchen

In the 2010 Domestic Violence Survey of South Korea, Korean men reported using violence in domestic settings due to feeling stressed, because they viewed violence as an appropriate tactic to resolve conflict, drank alcohol, or witnessed inter-parental violence at childhood.

=== Level of income ===
According to frequency analysis generated from the Korean National Survey, men with low socio-demographic characteristics were generally more violent. Different levels of household incomes were associated with different levels of intimate partner violence. The victims of domestic violence were more likely employed in service jobs, and offenders were more likely to be under the influence of alcohol.

== Statistics ==
The Korean government had reported to the UN Committee on Economic, Social, and Cultural Rights a prosecution of a total of 1,841 people for domestic violence, and a total of 4,833 people for protective dispositions. In 2007, the CEDAW report on Korea highlighted the low number of reporting and prosecuting of cases of violence against women, while urging the government to conduct more research on this trend. The Korean government explained that due to the many cases of falsified or exaggerated statement provided by the victims and offenders, and the close relationship between the victims and the offenders, it is difficult to collect evidence and facts. From the 1999 National Survey on intimate partner violence (IPV), about 34.1% of married or cohabiting couples in South Korea were involved in intimate partner violence. While in 2010, the National Survey demonstrated a decrease to 16.5% of married or cohabiting couples. In 2010, the rate of physical abuse against children was 29.9%, emotional abuse 52.1%, and neglect 17%.

In a 2014 study conducted by the Korean Institute of Criminology on violence between intimate partners, excluding violence in the family, in South Korea, 2.5% of sex crimes from 2005 to 2014 occurred between lovers. From 2005 to 2014 the number of crimes against lovers increased from 218 cases in 2005, to 686 cases in 2014. The main reasons for the sexual attacks were "under the influence of alcohol (25.1%)" or "a first time incident (28.2%)." In homicide cases, 10% of the cases occurred between lovers. In 80% of the cases, the offenders had previous criminal record, and the main reasons for the murders were "accidentally among divorces (45.2%)," " while drunken (42%)," and among the "lower class people (77.7%)."

From a 2022 survey conducted by the Ministry of Gender Equality and Family random sample (5,622 people) in South Korea about incidents of intimate partner violence, a total 9.4% of females respondents experienced domestic violence. Conversely, a total 5.8% of males respondents reported domestic violence as victims.

== Governmental efforts ==
The Korean government has adopted the Second Basic Plan for Gender Equality Policy 2018–2022, which sets specific goals to each ministry. The governmental budget for gender-related matters has increased to 7.4%, while it was 3.7% in 2010. In 1983, the Korean government agreed to the United Nations Convention on the Elimination of All Forms of Discrimination against Women (CEDAW). Due to growing pressure from international organizations, the government established the Korean Women's Development Institute in 1983 and the Ministry of Political Affairs II in 1984, designed to deal with women's issues.

The Korean government did not allocate sufficient budget and manpower to these institutions, which made them formal institutes with lack of power. The Korean government established the Ministry of Gender Equality (MOGE) in 2001 to focus on preventing domestic violence and providing protection to the victims. In August 2008, the Minister of Gender Equality signed the "Say NO to Violence against Women" campaign with the UN Development Fund for Women (UNIFEM).

The Korean government established emergency hotline centers, called the Women's Crisis Hotline 1366, in 16 cities and counties nationwide. The centers operate 24-hours and provide counseling, protection, and urgent services to women victims of domestic violence, sexual violence, and forced prostitution. The center provides telephone and online counseling in eight different languages. The center reports assisting 160,000 victims in a year.

=== Legislation ===
In 1998, the Korean government enforced two domestic violence laws. The Special Act for the Punishment of Domestic Violence legislates the punishments for the crimes of domestic violence (ibid. Art. 1). The second law, entitled the "Act on the Prevention of Domestic Violence and Protection, etc. of Victims Thereof," serves as a preventative law to the crimes of domestic violence and as a protection for the victims. The protection includes custody entrustment, therapy and counseling, probation, and limitation on access to family members.

The Act permits authorities to order offenders to keep away from victims for up to six months, while family members other than the victims are allowed to ask for restraining orders. The Act provides resources for the establishment of protection facilities for the victims of domestic violence. The Act was revised in October 2007, and guided for mandatory education on domestic violence in all schools (ibid., Art. 4–3; Korea 9 Apr. 2008, Para. 74). In 2005, the Korean Association of Regional Public Hospitals expended medical support for domestic violence victims such as "one-stop" support centers.

Spousal rape does not count as a crime under the Republic of Korea. In June 2007, the Republic of Korea announced in the Convention on the Elimination of all forms of Discrimination Against Women (CEDAW) its intentions to handle marital rape differently in the future due to recent court precedents in which spouses were prosecuted. In January 2009, for the first time a South Korean court had classified marital rape as a crime. According to The Korea Times, the husband had repeatedly raped his wife and used various weapons to threatened her. The husband was sentenced by the Busan District Court to a period of 30-months in prison.

== Activism ==
In the 1970s, many social movements challenged the current governance and were identified as pro-democracy and pro-human rights advocates. As more educated and working women joined the movements, they began addressing social issues, such as the need to revise family laws, counsel family planning, and aid sex workers.

In 1974, the Women Leaders' Consultative Meeting in South Korea discussed women's humanization, while studying the Korean women's difficulties and stereotypes they face in their life. The members drafted the Declaration on Women's Humanization, which identified patriarchy and gender inequality as obstacles to human liberation and progress in South Korea. As a result, the Christian Academy created "social education programs" for young Korean women to support women's activism and liberation movements. Many of the women who participated in the programs were young students with previous interest in the Declaration on Women's Humanization, Western feminism and the New Left. Many of them later joined the Korea Women's Hotline movement in 1983.

The Korean Women's Association United (KWAU) stated in January 2008 that the Korean government does not fully protect the victims of domestic violence. KWAU identified the reasons to the lack of governmental protection:

1. Violence at home is culturally a matter of privacy.
2. Legal and institutional safeguards for the victims are poor.
3. The awareness is low in the police.
4. The aggressor is often allowed to stay at home while the victim is driven away under the existing legal system.
5. Public services focus on counseling for the victims rather than punishment of the perpetrators, resulting in only 14.9% of prosecution among the arrested for domestic violence in 2003.

=== The Korea Women's Hotline (KWHL) ===
Established in 1983, The Korea Women's Hotline is the first women's human rights movement in the Republic of Korea, and an organization committed to promote gender equality and eliminate violence. The KWHL defines domestic violence as violence against women, and emphasizes the commercialization of sex and the impersonal treatment of gender in the Korean society. Practices such as enforcing termination of pregnancy, illegal trade of labor, forcing women to stop working after marriage, sex tourism, and beauty pageants are perceived as practices of gender violence in the KWHL vision. The KWHL views domestic violence as an international issue rather than a domestic concern and addresses it to the Korean government, and the rest of the world. In 1993, KWHL pressured the government to address sexual violence, domestic violence, and sex trade as crimes. With that pressure, the Prevention law was established in 1997.

In 1994, the movement organized the first Korean 'weekly event aimed at doing away with domestic violence.' KWHL has 25 branches across South Korea that provide victims of domestic violence with medical and legal assistance, telephone counseling, and rescue shelters to regain independence. In the initial hotline services in 1983, the movement conducted 1,930 counseling sessions, in which 45% of the cases involved physical violence against housewives. The KWHL has created a slogan to raise awareness to the social issues derived from the domestic violence existent in the society by saying "Peace in Family is Peace in Society".

== See also ==
- Gender inequality in South Korea
- Women in South Korea
