= Ray Rice =

American football player (born 1987)

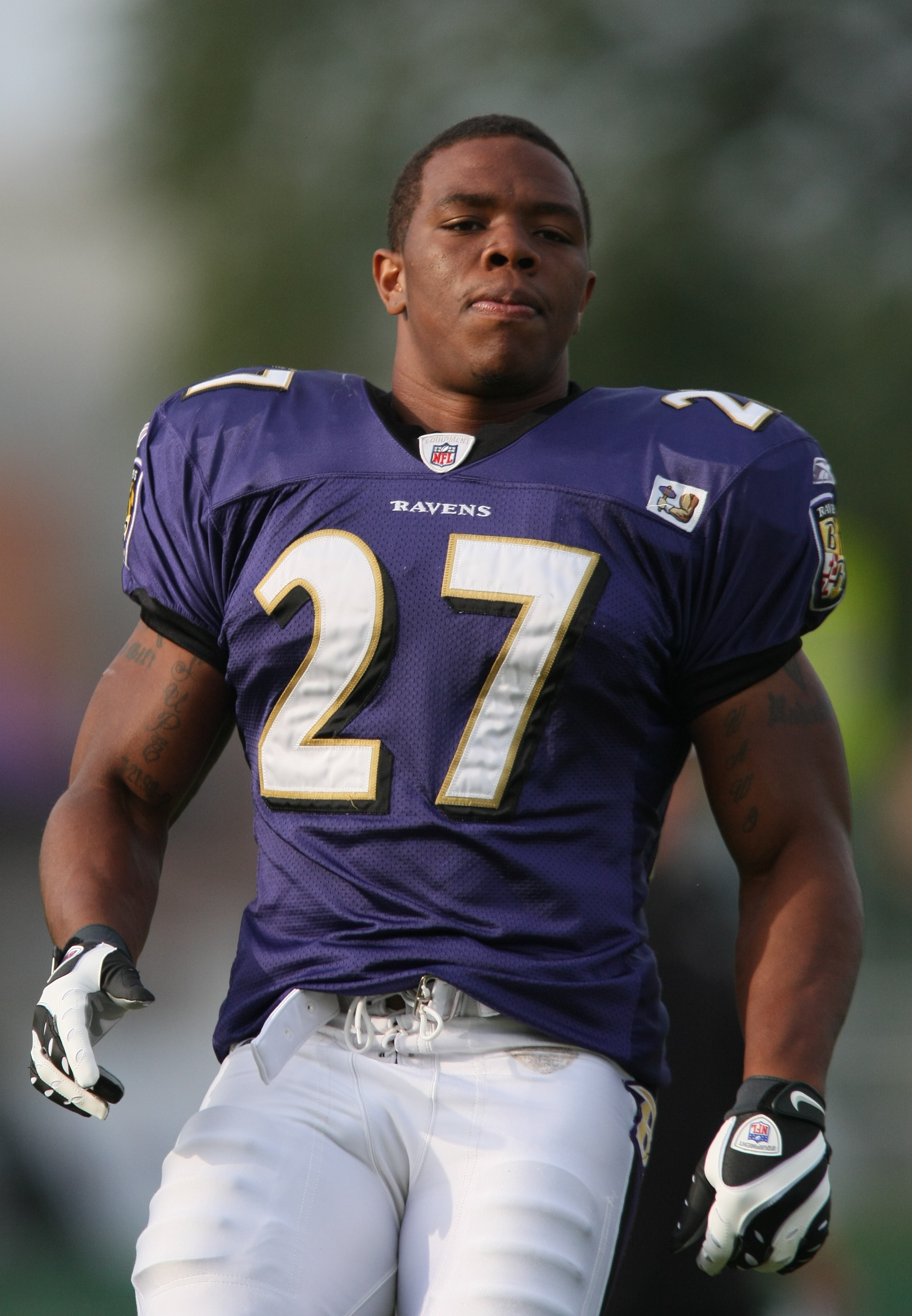
- Rice with the Baltimore Ravens in 2009

No. 27
- Position: Running back

Personal information
- Born: January 22, 1987 (age 39); New Rochelle, New York, U.S.
- Listed height: 5 ft 8 in (1.73 m)
- Listed weight: 206 lb (93 kg)

Career information
- High school: New Rochelle
- College: Rutgers (2005–2007)
- NFL draft: 2008: 2nd round, 55th overall pick

Career history
- Baltimore Ravens (2008–2013)

Awards and highlights
- Super Bowl champion (XLVII); 2× Second-team All-Pro (2009, 2011); 3× Pro Bowl (2009, 2011, 2012); First-team All-American (2007); Second-team All-American (2006); 2× First-team All-Big East (2006, 2007)

Career NFL statistics
- Rushing yards: 6,180
- Rushing average: 4.3
- Rushing touchdowns: 37
- Receptions: 369
- Receiving yards: 3,034
- Receiving touchdowns: 6
- Stats at Pro Football Reference

Raymell Mourice Rice (born January 22, 1987) is an American former professional football running back who played in the National Football League (NFL) for six seasons with the Baltimore Ravens. He played college football for the Rutgers Scarlet Knights, earning first-team All-American honors in 2007. Rice was selected by the Ravens in the second round of the 2008 NFL draft. During his career, Rice received three Pro Bowl and two second-team All-Pro selections and was a member of the team that won Super Bowl XLVII. He is second in franchise rushing yards, rushing attempts, and rushing touchdowns and third in franchise combined touchdowns.

During the 2014 offseason, a video surfaced of Rice physically attacking his fiancée. After being indicted for aggravated assault, Rice was released by the Ravens and suspended indefinitely by the NFL. Although Rice successfully appealed the indefinite suspension, the incident effectively ended his professional career as he would not be signed by another team.

== Early life ==
Raymell Mourice Rice was born to parents Janet Rice and Calvin Reed in New Rochelle, New York, on January 22, 1987. His father was killed in a drive-by shooting when Ray was a year old. Rice's cousin, Myshaun Rice-Nichols, was killed by a drunk driver when Rice was ten.

Rice attended New Rochelle High School, where he played football for longtime coach Lou DiRienzo. He was the Huguenots' primary running back. The last Iona–New Rochelle Turkey Bowl football game, which had been waged every year since 1949, was played in Rice's sophomore season of 2002, when New Rochelle defeated the Gaels 53–6. Rice led his team to a state title as a junior in 2003 when NRHS defeated Webster Schroeder 32–6 at the Carrier Dome in Syracuse. In Rice's senior year of 2004, New Rochelle fell to Christian Brothers Academy, who had Greg Paulus, 41–35 in the championship game. New Rochelle High School lost only one game in each of three seasons of varsity football. Rice holds the state record for yards in a single game: he gained 462 yards on 42 carries on October 24, 2004.

== College career ==
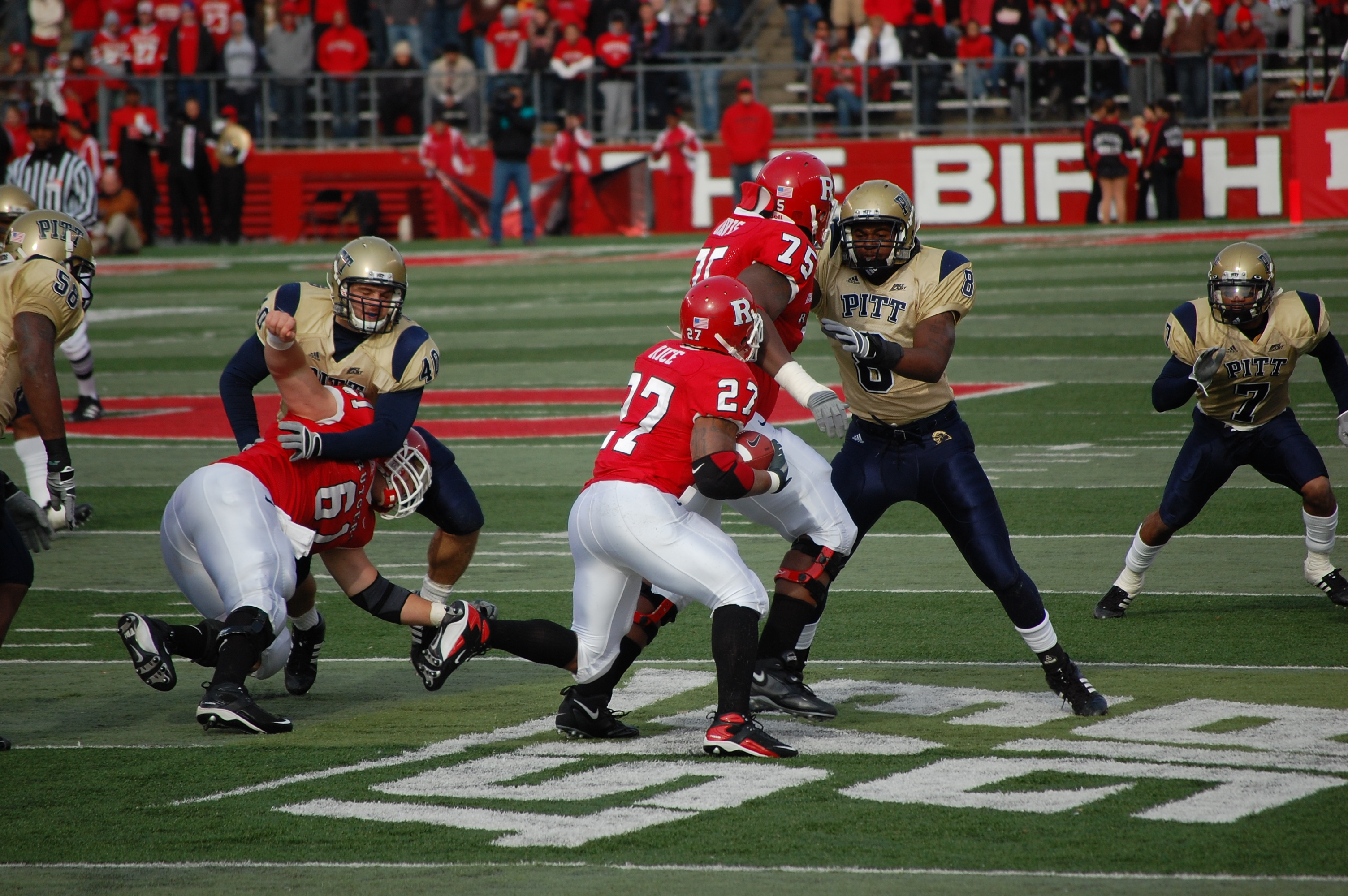
Rice (#27) with Rutgers playing against the Pittsburgh Panthers

Rice attended Rutgers University–New Brunswick, where he played football for coach Greg Schiano's Scarlet Knights from 2005 to 2007. In Rice's freshman year, Rutgers had its first winning season in 13 years and played in only the second bowl in the football program's then 136-year history. In 2006, the Scarlet Knights won a school record-tying 11 games and registered the school's highest-ever season-ending national poll ranking, finishing at #12 in both the Associated Press and Coaches Polls.

As a true freshman, Rice finished the season as the starting tailback for Rutgers. Rice rushed for 1,120 yards and five touchdowns during his freshman campaign, including a 217-yard performance against the Connecticut Huskies and a 195-yard performance against the Cincinnati Bearcats.

As a sophomore, Rice gained 1,794 rushing yards with 20 touchdowns. His rushing totals set Rutgers' single-season rushing yardage record, shattering J. J. Jennings' mark of 1,353 set in 1973. Rice's backfield partner during his freshman and sophomore seasons was fullback Brian Leonard. Leonard considered entering the NFL draft in 2006 but stayed for his senior year and took on a less prominent role in the offense, which aided Rice's rise to stardom. Rice was a finalist for the Maxwell Award and finished seventh in the Heisman Trophy voting. Rice was named Big East offensive player of the week a school-record three times in 2007. All three times, Rice rushed for over 200 yards: 201 yards against North Carolina, 202 yards against South Florida, and a career-high 225-yard game against the Pittsburgh Panthers. Rice ended his sophomore season with 170 yards on 24 carries with one touchdown during the inaugural Texas Bowl to give Rutgers its first bowl victory ever in a 37–10 win over Kansas State. He was named MVP of the game.

Rice was widely considered a candidate for both the Maxwell Award and the Heisman Trophy in 2007.

On October 6, 2007, against the Cincinnati Bearcats, Rice scored his 35th career rushing touchdown, which set the all-time program record. On November 9, 2007, against the Army Black Knights, Rice ran for 243 yards and scored twice in the 41–6 victory, setting a new school record previously set by Terrell Willis in 1994, and his new single-game record. On January 5, 2008, at the second annual International Bowl in Toronto, Rice ran for a new school record of 280 yards, along with four touchdowns, as Rutgers defeated Ball State 52–30. One of the touchdown runs (90 yards) was the longest of his career. Rice won the MVP award for his performance.

Following the season, Rice declared his intention to enter the 2008 NFL draft.

== Professional career ==
Pre-draft measurables
Height	Weight	Arm length	Hand span	40-yard dash	10-yard split	20-yard split	20-yard shuttle	Three-cone drill	Vertical jump	Broad jump	Bench press
5 ft 8 in (1.73 m)	199 lb (90 kg)	30 1/4 in (0.77 m)	9 1/4 in (0.23 m)	4.47 s	1.51 s	2.52 s	4.17 s	6.65 s	39 1/2 in (1.00 m)	10 ft 1 in (3.07 m)	23 reps
All values from NFL Combine/Pro Day

=== 2008 season ===
Rice was selected by the Baltimore Ravens in the second round (55th overall) of the 2008 NFL draft and signed a four-year deal with the Ravens worth $2.805 million plus a $1.1 million signing bonus. He played for coach John Harbaugh, who coincidentally was in his first year as coach of the Ravens. Rice wore number No. 39 during the preseason, then switched to No. 27 (his number at Rutgers) after the Ravens cut cornerback Ronnie Prude.

Rice made his first career start in his first NFL game, which was Week 1 of the 2008 season against the Cincinnati Bengals. Rice had a team-high 22 carries for 64 yards, fumbling once. Rice also had three receptions for 19 yards in the Ravens' 17–10 win. Rice had his best game of the season in Week 9 against the Cleveland Browns, filling in for the injured Willis McGahee, where he ran for 154 yards on 21 carries. Rice finished out the season with 546 rushing yards on 107 carries and had 273 receiving yards on 33 receptions.

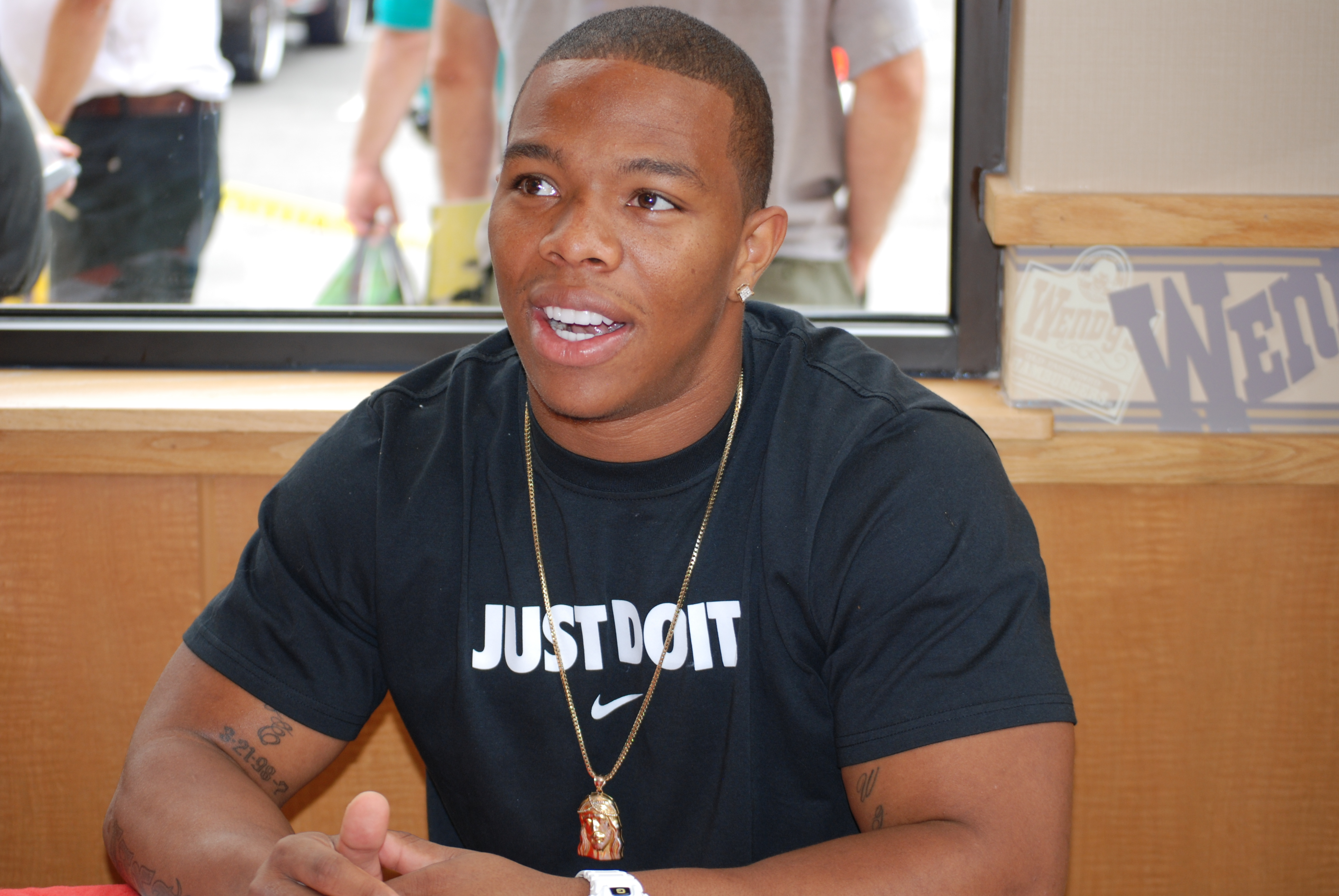
Rice signing autographs in 2009

=== 2009 season ===
It was announced during training camp that Rice won the starting running back job over Willis McGahee for the 2009 NFL season and that Le'Ron McClain would be switching back to full-time fullback duties. McClain and McGahee had been the primary running backs the previous year.

In the season opener against the Kansas City Chiefs, Rice rushed for 108 yards on 19 carries, which was his second career 100-yard rushing game. In Week 3, Rice rushed for his first professional touchdown against the Cleveland Browns. On October 11, he caught his first touchdown reception against the Cincinnati Bengals. On October 18, 2009, in Week 6, Rice led his team in both rushing and receiving yards against the Minnesota Vikings. He rushed for 77 yards off 10 carries, scoring two touchdowns. He also caught 10 passes for 117 yards in the 33–31 loss. In Week 14, against the Detroit Lions, Rice had career-best 166 rushing yards and 216 total yards, scoring one touchdown. In Week 16, on the road against the Pittsburgh Steelers, Rice had a career-high 30 carries and tallied 141 rushing yards, which broke a Steelers' streak of 32 consecutive games without allowing a 100-yard rusher. He finished the season with 254 carries for 1,339 yards and 7 touchdowns, averaging 5.3 yards per carry.

Rice was selected to the 2010 Pro Bowl, his first, on December 29, 2009.

In the Wild Card Round against the New England Patriots on January 10, 2010, Rice scored an 83-yard touchdown run on the first offensive play for the Ravens, which was the longest play for the Ravens that season, the longest rush of his NFL career, and the second-longest rush in NFL postseason history. The run was part of a 159-yard, two-touchdown performance in the 33–14 victory. In the Divisional Round loss to the Indianapolis Colts, he had 13 carries for 67 rushing yards and a lost fumble as well as nine receptions for 60 yards.

=== 2010 season ===
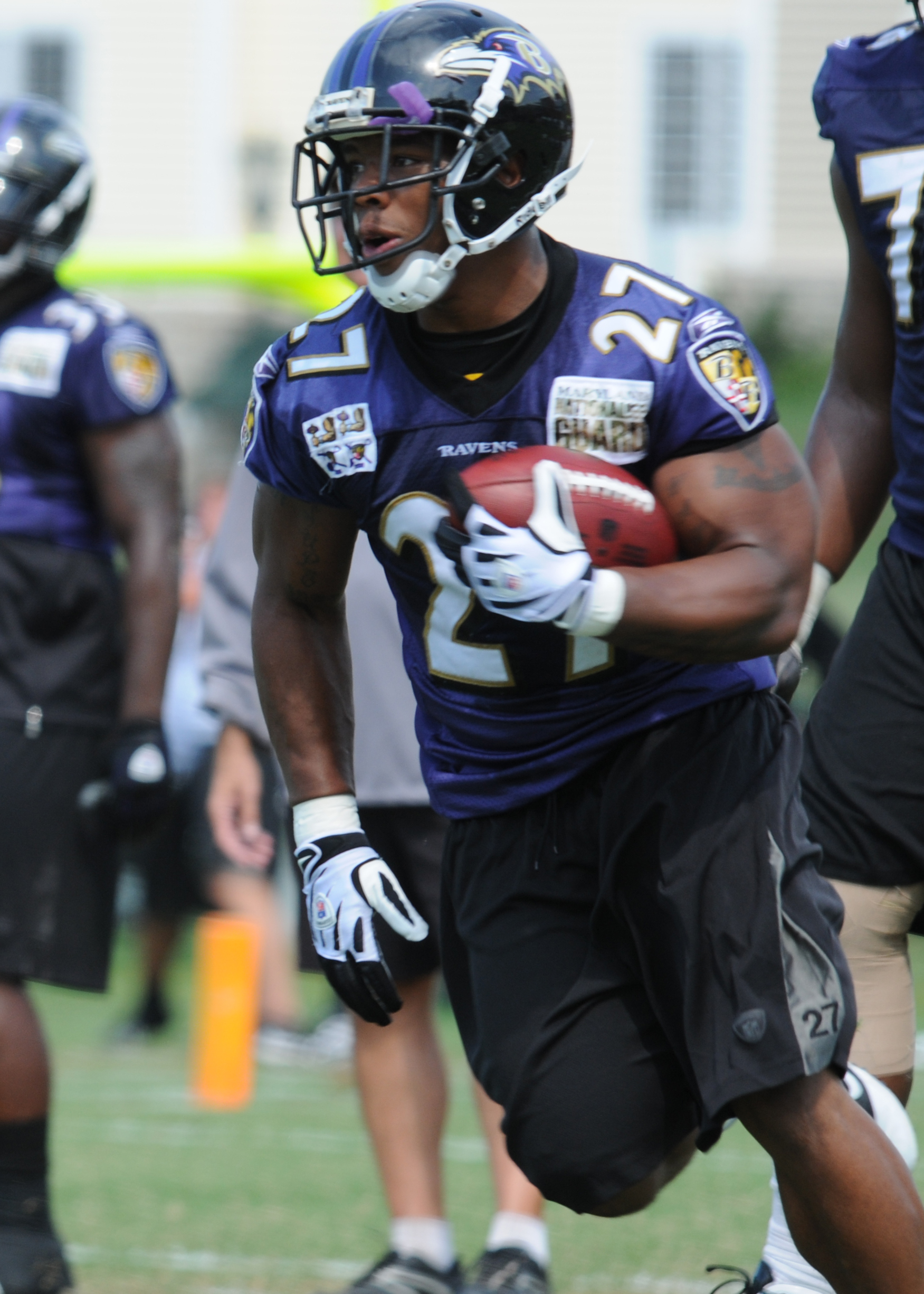
Rice at Ravens practice in 2010

On December 20, 2010, against the New Orleans Saints, Rice amassed a career-best 233 yards from scrimmage (153 rushing and 80 receiving) to go along with two touchdowns. The 233 yards are also the third most in Ravens franchise history. For his efforts, Rice was awarded his first AFC Offensive Player of the Week award. On January 9, 2010, in the Wild Card Round of the playoffs against the Kansas City Chiefs, Rice became the first Ravens running back to have a receiving touchdown in a playoff game. He had 99 scrimmage yards and a receiving touchdown in the 30–7 victory. In the Divisional Round loss to the Pittsburgh Steelers, he had 64 scrimmage yards and a rushing touchdown.

Rice finished the 2010 season with 1,220 total rushing yards, and 556 total receiving yards. He was ranked 56th by his fellow players on the NFL Top 100 Players of 2011.

=== 2011 season ===
In the season opener against the Pittsburgh Steelers, Rice gained 107 yards rushing and a rushing touchdown, while recording four receptions for 42 yards and a receiving touchdown in the 35–7 victory. This performance was only the second time a running back had gained more than 100 rushing yards against the Steelers defense since the 2009 season, both belonging to Rice. In Week 10, he threw his first career passing touchdown on a one-yard completion to tight end Ed Dickson in a loss to the Seattle Seahawks. In Week 13, Rice ran for 204 yards against the Cleveland Browns, including a 68-yard touchdown, giving him his fourth 100-yard rushing game of the season as well as his third consecutive year with 1,000 rushing yards. In the following game, Rice ran for 103 yards on 26 carries, averaging almost four yards per carry and scoring a touchdown (despite a lost fumble) in a win against the Indianapolis Colts. In a Week 17 win against the Cincinnati Bengals, Rice rushed for 191 yards, including a 70-yard touchdown run in the first two minutes of the game and a 51-yard touchdown with less than six minutes left in the fourth quarter; this performance not only earned Rice AFC Offensive Player of the Week but also helped the Ravens seal their first division title under John Harbaugh. Rice finished the season with 1,364 yards off 291 attempts, averaging 4.7 yards a carry. He also had 12 touchdowns. He was second in the league in total rush yards and finished first in total yards from scrimmage. Rice had 704 receiving yards off 76 catches, averaging 9.3 yards a reception. Rice was selected for his second Pro Bowl in 2011 and voted to the NFL All-Pro Team.

Rice was for the most part held in check during the 2012 playoffs, having just 47 touches for 158 yards and being kept out of the end zone in two games against the Houston Texans in the Divisional Round victory and the New England Patriots in the AFC Championship loss. He was ranked 22nd on the NFL's Top 100 Players of 2012.

=== 2012 season ===
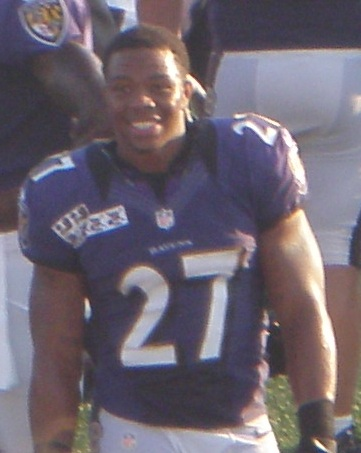
Rice at Navy–Marine Corps Memorial Stadium in 2012

On July 16, 2012, Rice agreed to a five-year, $35 million deal with the Baltimore Ravens after being franchise tagged earlier in the offseason.

On November 25, 2012, the Ravens were down three with under two minutes left in a road game against the San Diego Chargers. The Ravens had the ball at their own 37 on a fourth and extremely long 29. Quarterback Joe Flacco passed short middle to Rice, who followed up by avoiding defenders for 29 yards and getting the first down in what Ravens' coach John Harbaugh dubbed as the play that will "go down in history." The Ravens went on to tie the game at the conclusion of the drive with a field goal and won the game in overtime. For his performance, he received the AFC Offensive Player of the Week award and the GMC Never Say Never Moment of the Week award. The play itself also received the nickname "Hey Diddle-Diddle". He finished the 2012 season with 1,143 rushing yards and nine rushing touchdowns to go along with 61 receptions for 478 receiving yards and one receiving touchdown. He was named to the Pro Bowl for the third time.

On February 3, 2013, the Ravens defeated the San Francisco 49ers in Super Bowl XLVII, earning Rice his first and only Super Bowl ring. In the Super Bowl, Rice had 20 carries for 59 yards and four receptions for 19 yards. Rice was ranked 13th by his fellow players on the NFL Top 100 Players of 2013.

=== 2013 season ===
In 2013, Rice got off to a slow start due to injury but played in 15 games and had a career-low 3.1 yards per carry. In Week 11, Rice had his best game of the season, rushing for 131 yards on 25 carries in the Ravens' 23–20 overtime loss to the Chicago Bears. He rushed for 660 yards on 214 carries for four touchdowns in the 2013 season.

=== Post suspension and retirement ===
While on suspension for his domestic violence case, Rice was released by the Ravens on September 8, 2014. After the public release of the video of the incident from TMZ, the NFL announced he was suspended indefinitely; moreover, the Ravens recalled all Rice items from their pro shop as well as other known stores nationwide and announced an exchange program the day after. Shortly after, it was announced that Rice would appeal the suspension on the grounds that he was suspended twice for the same offense, which is a violation of league rules. On November 28, 2014, it was announced that he won his appeal to be reinstated in the NFL.

On January 15, 2015, Rice and the Ravens reportedly agreed to settle his lawsuit against the team. He had sued for $3.529 million in back pay that he would have earned for the final 15 weeks after serving the NFL's two-game suspension. The settlement came immediately before the hearing was to begin in Baltimore, effectively ending the litigation between Rice and the Ravens. In 2016, he vowed to donate all of that season's salary to domestic violence charities if he were signed by a team, but he remained unsigned. In 2018, Rice announced that his football career was over.

== Career Statistics ==
=== NFL ===
Legend
	Won the Super Bowl
**Bold**	Career high

==== Regular season ====
Year	Team	Games		Rushing						Receiving						Fumbles	
Year	Team	GP	GS	Att	Yds	Avg	Y/G	Lng	TD	Rec	Yds	Avg	Y/G	Lng	TD	Fum	Lost
2008	BAL	13	4	107	454	4.2	34.9	60	0	33	273	8.3	21.0	40	0	1	1
2009	BAL	16	15	254	1,339	**5.3**	83.7	59	7	**78**	702	9.0	43.9	**63**	1	**3**	**3**
2010	BAL	16	14	**307**	1,220	4.0	76.3	50	5	63	556	8.8	34.8	34	1	0	0
2011	BAL	16	16	291	**1,364**	4.7	**85.3**	**70**	**12**	76	**704**	**9.3**	**44.0**	52	**3**	2	2
2012	BAL	16	16	257	1,143	4.4	71.4	46	9	61	478	7.8	29.9	43	1	1	0
2013	BAL	15	15	214	660	3.1	44.0	47	4	58	321	5.5	21.4	22	0	2	2
Career		92	80	1,430	6,180	4.3	67.2	70	37	369	3,034	8.2	33.0	63	6	9	8

==== Playoffs ====
Year	Team	Games		Rushing						Receiving						Fumbles	
Year	Team	GP	GS	Att	Yds	Avg	Y/G	Lng	TD	Rec	Yds	Avg	Y/G	Lng	TD	Fum	Lost
2008	BAL	2	0	1	2	2.0	1.0	2	0	3	43	**14.3**	21.5	22	0	0	0
2009	BAL	2	2	35	226	**6.5**	**113.0**	**83**	**2**	9	60	6.7	30.0	26	0	1	1
2010	BAL	2	2	29	89	3.1	44.5	14	1	**12**	74	6.2	**37.0**	11	**1**	1	1
2011	BAL	2	2	42	127	3.0	63.5	12	0	5	31	6.2	15.5	20	0	1	0
2012	BAL	4	4	**84**	**306**	3.6	76.5	32	**2**	8	**88**	11.0	22.0	**47**	0	**3**	**3**
Career		12	10	191	750	3.9	62.5	83	5	37	296	8.0	24.7	47	1	6	5

=== College ===
Season	Team	GP	Rushing				Receiving		
Season	Team	GP	Att	Yds	Avg	TD	Rec	Yds	TD
2005	Rutgers	12	195	1,120	5.7	5	8	65	0
2006	Rutgers	13	335	1,794	5.4	20	4	30	0
2007	Rutgers	13	380	2,012	5.3	24	25	239	1
Total		38	910	4,926	5.4	49	37	334	1

== Career highlights ==
- Super Bowl champion (XLVII)
- 3× Pro Bowl selection (2009, 2011, 2012)
- 2× Second-team All-Pro selection (2009, 2011)
- AFC rushing touchdowns leader (2011)
- NFL scrimmage yards leader (2011)
- NFL Moment of the Year (2012)
- Ranked No. 56 in the Top 100 Players of 2011
- Ranked No. 22 in the Top 100 Players of 2012
- Ranked No. 13 in the Top 100 Players of 2013
- First-team All-American (2007)
- Second-team All-American (2006)
- 2× First-team All-Big East (2006, 2007)

== Domestic violence criminal charges ==
On February 15, 2014, Rice and his fiancée (now wife), Janay Palmer, were arrested and charged with assault after a physical altercation at the then Revel Casino in Atlantic City, New Jersey. After a night of heavy drinking, Palmer and Rice got into an argument, and Rice then followed Palmer into an elevator after he left the table where they had been seated. They then shouted obscenities at each other, and Palmer appeared to spit in Rice's face before he struck her. On February 19, celebrity news website TMZ posted a video of Rice and Palmer hitting each other in an elevator, with Rice punching her in the face, causing her to fall and hit her head on the elevator handrail and lose consciousness, and then dragging her out of the elevator. The Ravens issued a statement following TMZ's release of the video, calling Rice's domestic violence arrest a "serious matter". The matter was handled by the Atlantic County Prosecutor's Office. On September 8, 2014, a law enforcement official showed the Associated Press a video of the incident with audio of the elevator incident that was longer than the video released by TMZ Sports.

On March 27, 2014, a grand jury indicted Rice on third-degree aggravated assault, with a possible jail sentence of three to five years and a fine of up to $15,000. Six weeks after the incident, Rice married Palmer on March 28, 2014. For the incident, Rice was suspended for the first two games of the 2014 NFL season on July 25, 2014. The criminal charges were later dropped after Rice agreed to undergo court-supervised counseling. In a news conference announcing longer suspension lengths for future domestic violence incidents, NFL Commissioner Roger Goodell said that he "didn't get it right" in deciding Rice's punishment.

In January 2015, the Baltimore Ravens settled the claim after Rice filed a formal grievance against the NFL for wrongful termination. Rice demanded $3.5 million based on the claim that the Ravens imposed a second punishment upon him by terminating his employment weeks after the NFL levied a two-game suspension. Although the details of the settlement were not disclosed, it was estimated that he received most of his claim.

== Charitable works ==
Rice is known for his community service. In 2012, he was voted the city of Baltimore's most charitable person. Causes that Rice was involved in include the Make-A-Wish Foundation, cyberbullying prevention, and homeless aid. In 2016, Rice and a friend gave Christmas presents to children from low-income families.

Since the end of his career, Rice has also become a motivational speaker, addressing high school students and college athletes by speaking out against domestic violence, using his assault charge as a cautionary tale.
