= National Coalition Against Domestic Violence =

Non-profit organization in the US

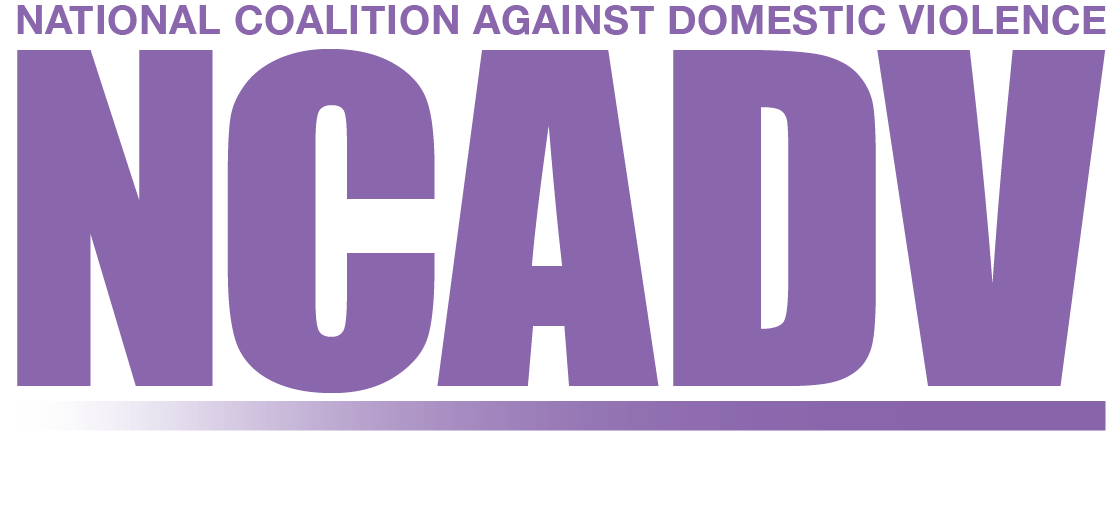
- Abbreviation: NCADV
- Formation: September 22, 1978; 48 years ago
- Tax ID no.: 91-1081344
- Legal status: 501(c)(3) nonprofit organization
- Headquarters: Denver, Colorado
- Coordinates: 39.7170634°N 104.9878785°W
- Region served: United States
- Board President: Cheryl Davis
- President, Chief Executive Officer: Ruth M. Glenn
- Revenue: $976,455 (2017)
- Expenses: $1,085,257 (2017)
- Employees: 11 (2017)
- Website: www.ncadv.org

National Coalition Against Domestic Violence (NCADV) is a 501(c)(3) nonprofit organization with the mission of being the voice of victims and survivors of domestic violence. Based in Denver, Colorado. National Coalition Against Domestic Violence's objective is to create a society that holds domestic abusers responsible for their activity.

== Current Work ==
=== Legislative Policy Advocacy ===
National Coalition Against Domestic Violence works with members of Congress to improve legislation dealing with domestic violence. Responding to the problem of domestic violence offenders who fight with victims for custody of their children, NCADV advocates for legislation that keeps the best interest of the children in mind.

In 1994, NCADV was part of a team to pass the Violence Against Women Act to provide funding for investigation into domestic violence and prosecution of offenders.

National Coalition Against Domestic Violence has also helped with the Family Violence Prevention and Services Act, International Violence Against Women Act, and Legislative Action Day.

NCADV utilizes consensus as their chosen decision-making process for legislative action. Caucuses of marginalized groups instituted by the organization are Battered/Formerly Battered Women; Women of Color; Jewish Women; Rural; Child and Youth Advocacy; Rainbow Pride; and Queer People of Color.

=== Current Programs ===
==== Cosmetic and Reconstructive Support ====
The Cosmetic and Reconstructive Support Program was created to connect survivors of domestic violence to medical providers around the country. Pro bono services may be available to those in need of a provider to repair injuries inflicted by an abusive spouse or partner.

Currently, the National Coalition Against Domestic Violence assists survivors with the application process to ensure all qualifications have been met and to provide support while working diligently with several medical groups and individual providers to streamline the process. NCADV works with three provider partner groups, including Reconstructing Hope, Face to Face, and Face Forward

==== National Victim-Centered Conferences ====
National Coalition Against Domestic Violence sponsors conferences frequently to bring survivors and leaders together to freely speak on the topic of domestic violence and develop connections with one another. One event held by the nonprofit was the 2016 National Coalition Against Domestic Violence Conference held October 23–26, 2016 in Chandler, Arizona.

The NCADV holds an annual three-day conference, inviting survivors, advocates, and community leaders to share their stories. Submissions for presentations require certain qualifications, including that of being survivor focused and sensitive to the experiences individuals in the audience may have had.

==== Advocacy Webinars ====
In 2016, National Coalition Against Domestic Violence created a series of professional advocacy webinars. NCADV's monthly webinars explore emerging issues, insights, best practices, and research from leaders in the domestic violence field. Each webinar offers an opportunity to improve an advocate's skillset and knowledge base with detailed, hands-on video training. Topics for webinars in 2018 range from effective outreach to LGBTQ survivors of abuse to the dangers and impact of strangulation to examining the global effort to end violence against women.

==== Survivor Speaker's Bureau ====
National Coalition Against Domestic Violence's National Speakers Bureau that connects survivors to the community as well as create awareness and dialogue around issues related to domestic violence. Voices, National Coalition Against Domestic Violence's National Speakers Bureau is the platform that encourages domestic violence survivors to raise their voices to speak about the complexities of intimate partner violence. Voices helps transform the narrative surrounding domestic violence by giving the issue real faces, real voices and real stories at a grassroots level.

=== Current Projects ===
==== Project Opal ====
Project Opal is a joint mission by both the NCADV and The National Domestic Violence Hotline. The goal is to combine resources such as the modernization of programs and services, contributors on both teams, as well as assets from both organizations in order to support authentic change on the national level. Project Opal aims to do the following:

- Build a network of resources that are able to be used regionally, statewide, nationally, and internationally
- Provide education, training, and technical assistance that is survivor, trauma and field informed
- Host the national conference on domestic violence
- Situation and culturally based responses to violence as alternatives to traditional law enforcement response
- Advocate for policies and protections that have a focus on survivors
- Create an environment and set individuals up with the tools that they need to work with the organization and the nature of its work
- Provide the right tools and resources for marginalized communities to address domestic violence and the creation of strategies in order to achieve social and racial justice in cases with such dynamics

==== The Hotline ====
The National Domestic Violence Hotline is a 24/7 resource for those who may be experiencing or know someone experiencing domestic violence. Established in 1994 by the Violence Against Women Act (VAWA), the Hotline has helped over 460,000 people via live services and 150,000 through online services.

==== Remember My Name ====
In October 1994, National Coalition Against Domestic Violence teamed up with Ms. magazine to create "Remember My Name", a list of victims who have lost their lives to domestic violence.

The project records information about each victim who was killed, including their age at the time of death, the names and ages of surviving children, and the weapon used against them. The project also documents information about each perpetrator, including relationship to victim, their name, age, and sentence received.

Retaining detailed information helps defend against questions about the validity of domestic violence statistics.

==== Rebuilding Financially After Domestic Violence ====
In 2001, National Coalition Against Domestic Violence partnered with The National Endowment for Financial Education to produce a manual, titled Hope & Power for Your Personal Finances: A Rebuilding Guide Following Domestic Violence, which serves to inform and assist women who have been victims of domestic violence to regain financial freedom in their lives. This program deals with topics including budgeting, banking, lending, dealing with workplace abuse, and identity theft.

In 2016, NCADV and National Endowment for Financial Education expanded the financial education program to include free webinars for victims and survivors of domestic violence as well as the advocates who serve them. Topics covered in 2018 ranged from transitional housing to financial stability to retirement planning for survivors and advocates.

==== Take a Stand for Healthy Relationships ====
Take A Stand FOR Healthy Relationships teaches students how to understand and build healthy relationships. With self paced modules and lesson plans students will acquire skills in communication, self awareness and emotional intelligence to help them build healthy relationships. Accompanying educator guides provide school staff with strategies to support students through the critical content.

==== Disarm Domestic Violence ====
National Coalition Against Domestic Violence, the Educational Fund to Stop Gun Violence, the Alliance for Gun Responsibility Foundation, and the Prosecutors Against Gun Violence have teamed up to launch a new initiative: Disarm Domestic Violence. The Disarm Domestic Violence website is intended to allow advocates, gun violence prevention activists, survivors, victims, law enforcement officers, prosecutors, and others to research state-specific laws on domestic violence-related protective order firearm removals and take steps to remove guns from armed abusers.

==== Hope & Power for Your Personal Finances: A Rebuilding Guide Following Domestic Violence ====
Financial barriers and control are often a reason victims do not have the agency to leave their situations. In partnership with The National Endowment for Financial Education, the program aims to assist and rebuild the financial situations of those who are leaving domestic violence situations.

==== Donate Your Old Electronics ====
In partnership with Cellular Recycler, the NCADV offers a program in which the donation of electronics (cell phones, laptops, video game systems) provides a portion of funds for the organization and its programming and projects.

== Past Accomplishments ==
=== Domestic Violence Awareness Month ===
Domestic Violence Awareness Month (DVAM) evolved from the Day of Unity held in October 1981. The first Domestic Violence Awareness Month was observed in October 1987.

Congress designated October as DVAM in 1989. Such legislation has passed every year since with National Coalition Against Domestic Violence providing key leadership.

=== Day of Unity ===
National Coalition Against Domestic Violence conceived the first annual Day of Unity in 1981. The intent was to connect advocates across the nation who were working to end violence against women and their children. The activities conducted were varied but had common themes:

- Mourning those who have died because of domestic violence
- Celebrating those who have survived
- Connecting those who work to end violence

The Day of Unity expanded to become an entire week devoted to a range of activities conducted at the local, state, and national level.

Each year, the Day of Unity is celebrated the first Monday of Domestic Violence Awareness Month.

=== Media ===
National Coalition Against Domestic Violence creates public service announcements to help increase awareness of domestic violence and help people affected by it to call the National Domestic Violence Hotline at 1-800-799-SAFE (7233).

== History ==
National Coalition Against Domestic Violence began at the United States Commission on Civil Rights hearing on battered women. Beginning as 100 individuals, it became thousands of members working together and sharing their experiences with domestic violence, homophobia, sexism, racism, and ageism. NCADV was officially incorporated as a nonprofit organization on September 22, 1978.

== See also ==
- Outline of domestic violence
- Post-assault treatment of victims of sexual assault
- Violence against women
