= Book Dash =

Social impact publisher

- Founded: 2014; 11 years ago
- Country of origin: South Africa
- Fiction genres: Picture book
- Official website: bookdash.org

Book Dash is a social impact publisher (SIP) which works with volunteer creatives to produce open access children's picture books. Their aim is to create and publish high-quality picture books with storylines and illustrations that represent South African children's lived experiences, and make these open-access books available in vernacular languages, in print and on digital platforms.

== Background ==
Book hunger is a pervasive problem worldwide. In South Africa, a national reading survey indicated that 63% of South African households did not have any fiction or nonfiction books, and 65% of homes with children under 10 did not have any picture books. In many schools, reading is seen as "oratorical" and taught as an oral performance, with little emphasis on comprehending written text. By Grade 4, according to the Progress in International Reading Literacy Study, four in five South African children cannot read for meaning in any language.

== Organization ==
Book Dash is a non-profit organization, founded in 2014, that seeks to address the absence of picture books in homes. They envision every child owning 100 books before age five. Unlike the commercial publishing industry, where books take a long time to produce and are expensive, Book Dash uses volunteers to produce openly published books quickly.

The book creation model that Book Dash follows has similarities to the Booksprints model, where a group of experts take a few days to design, edit and illustrate a book. At each Book Dash event, ~10 children's books are created over a 12-hour period. The storybooks are published under a Creative Commons (CC BY 4.0) License, allowing others to download, re-use and adapt these children's books and translate them. The books are printed and given away for free. In its first decade, Book Dash created more than 200 titles and gave away more than 4 million books.

In 2024, Book Dash was recognized as "Platform of the Year" by Brittle Paper. It was named a Library of Congress 2020 Best Practice Honoree and has been shortlisted for the Astrid Lindgren Memorial Award.
