= National Domestic Violence Hotline =

Telephone hotline for domestic violence victims

The National Domestic Violence Hotline (NDVH) is a 24-hour confidential service in the United States for survivors, victims and those affected by domestic violence, intimate partner violence and relationship abuse. Advocates are available at 1-800-799-SAFE (7233) and through online chatting at thehotline.org. All calls are free and confidential.

The NDVH was created through the Violence Against Women Act (VAWA). The hotline answered its first call on February 21, 1996. The NDVH offers a variety of help options, and provides information on topics such as domestic violence, financial abuse, LGBTQ relationship abuse, domestic violence policy updates, what to expect when calling the hotline, and life after abuse and domestic violence. The NDVH also oversees the "Loveisrespect" project, a resource aimed at empowering young people through education and support, while seeking to prevent unhealthy relationships and intimate partner violence.

== Hotline description ==
The hotline is 100% confidential. Hotline operators, whom the NDVH calls "advocates", are given training and practice sessions prior to answering calls and are instructed to ask the caller a set of questions to ensure that the caller is safe, to ascertain the situation, and to help the caller determine a course of action. The hotline is intended to be used not only by people experiencing domestic violence, but also by people who feel they are beginning to show signs of abusing their partner. The hotline advocate will help the caller by asking questions to identify red flags, and teach the caller techniques on how to calm down.

The hotline operates 24/7, is available in over 200 languages, and is open to calls from undocumented immigrants. The NDVH's website also provides information on a variety of topics about domestic abuse, which includes the definition of abuse and its warning signs. The website also offers tips for victims and survivors, statistics and resources, as well as information on how to have healthy relationships.

== Break the Cycle ==
Break the Cycle is a partner of both the National Domestic Violence Hotline and Loveisrespect. Break the Cycle was founded in 1996, to help provide a resource for young people, specifically ages 12–24, experiencing dating violence. Break the Cycle provides leadership and education opportunities to teach young people about healthy relationships. Let's Be Real (LBR) is an online/offline movement for people under the age of 24 to come together and have conversations about relationships such as sexuality, break-ups, and first-time hookups.

== Loveisrespect ==
Educational Card from Jennifer Ann's Group featuring the National Teen Dating Abuse Helpline

Loveisrespect, a 24-hour national Web-based and telephone resource, was created to help young people (ages 13–26) experiencing dating abuse, and is the only helpline in the U.S. serving all 50 states, Puerto Rico and the Virgin Islands. It was launched February 8, 2007, by the National Domestic Violence Hotline and partnered with Break the Cycle in 2011. In addition to the telephone hotline there is a text feature, and a live chat option, which allows teens to connect to trained peer advocates via the web.

=== Dating Bill of Rights ===
The Loveisrespect website helped formulate the Teen Dating Bill of Rights, a set of affirmations and pledges for teens which emphasize the importance of recognizing dating abuse, and the need for young people to take a stand and nurture healthy relationships.

Teen Dating Bill of Rights

I have the right:
- To always be treated with respect.
- To be in a healthy relationship.
- To not be hurt physically or emotionally.
- To refuse sex or affection at anytime.
- To have friends and activities apart from my boyfriend or girlfriend.
- To end a relationship.

I pledge to:
- Always treat my boyfriend or girlfriend with respect.
- Never hurt my boyfriend or girlfriend physically, verbally, or emotionally.
- Respect my girlfriend's or boyfriend's decisions concerning sex and affection.
- Not be controlling or manipulative in my relationship.
- Accept responsibility for myself and my actions.

== Domestic violence in the LGBTQ community ==
The NDVH is aware that domestic violence can happen to anyone regardless of sex, gender, race, or sexual orientation. Research shows that people in LGBTQ relationships often use the same tools to gain power over their partner as in heterosexual relationships. These tactics can include using children, privilege, isolation and emotional abuse.

== See also ==
- Domestic violence in the United States
- List of domestic violence hotlines
- National Coalition Against Domestic Violence
- Outline of domestic violence
