= Convicted Women Against Abuse =

Founded in 1989, Convicted Women Against Abuse (CWAA) was initiated and led by incarcerated survivors of gender-based violence imprisoned at the California Institution for Women (CIW) in Chino, CA. This group supports incarcerated survivors to share their experiences of victimization, collectively strategize with respect to their legal cases, and organize for freedom.
