= Korea Women's Hot Line =

South Korean women's rights group

Korea Women's Hot Line (KWHL) is a non-profit women's rights activist group, protecting women's rights from violence, advancing women's social position, and establishing gender equality in the spheres of family, work, and society. In politics, economics, society, and culture,

Contrary to its name, KWHL is not an emergency call center, but a women's movement organization, focusing on eradicating domestic and sexual violence. KWHL was established in 1983, in the beginning of the women's movement in South Korea. Nowadays, it has 26 local branches in South Korea. KWHL oversees counseling centers and shelters for survivors of domestic violence, produces films, lobbys and organises symposiums and demonstrations. KWHL is a member of the Korean Women's Associations United.

One of KWHL's largest programs is the International Solidarity Program, which networks with other women's NGOs, particularly in regrds to women's rights and domestic violence. The Asian Women's Network's third International Symposium ("State Responsibility to Combat Domestic Violence and the Role of the Women's Rights Movement") was hosted by KWHL in South Korea in September 2008.

KWHL publishes an annual English newsletter, titled "Through Women's Eyes."

KWHL also holds an annual film festival in Seoul to showcase international and domestic films regarding women's rights and struggles. The festival is called the Korea Women's Film Festival (FIWOM).

== See also ==
- Domestic violence in South Korea
- Gender inequality in South Korea
