= POWA =

South African nongovernmental organisation

- Founded: 1979; 47 years ago
- Website: powa.co.za

POWA, People Opposing Women Abuse, is a South African NGO established in 1979 which undertakes campaigns, projects and research related to violence against women in Africa. POWA was the first organisation in South Africa to establish a shelter for abused women in 1981. In 1999, at the time of the Tuli elephant cruelty case, POWA ran a controversial TV advertisement claiming that many people "care more for abused animals than for abused women".

== Projects ==
=== Sector Capacity Building and Strengthening ===
POWA provides training education and mentorship to women's groups so they understand the women's rights discourse and to formalise services that directly affect their current needs.

=== Law Reform ===
POWA attempts to influence national, regional and international policy in ways that supports empowering and supporting women.

=== Rights Education ===
The responsibility of their branch offices includes rights education through workshops and community meetings.

=== Sheltering and counselling ===
Free counselling and shelter is provided to all South African women that are in need of it. POWA has six satellite offices and two confidential shelters.
