= Ellen Berliner =

American activist and feminist

Ellen W. Berliner
- Born: Ellen Wade; June 10, 1920; Bellflower, California, United States
- Died: March 4, 2011 (aged 90); St. Clair Hospital, Mt. Lebanon, Pennsylvania, United States
- Occupations: Social justice and Alzheimer's Disease research advocate
- Years active: 1950s to 2011
- Known for: Pittsburgh Post-Gazette's Outstanding Citizen of the Year (1991)
- Notable work: Co-founder, with Molly Rush, of the South Hills Association for Racial Equality (1970s); Co-founder, with Anne Steytler, of the Women's Center & Shelter of Greater Pittsburgh
- Spouse: Arthur Frank Berliner

Ellen W. Berliner (1920–2011) was an American activist and feminist who became known for her pioneering social justice work and Alzheimer's disease research advocacy.

A co-founder, with Molly Rush, of the South Hills Association for Racial Equality during the 1960s, she subsequently co-founded the Women's Center & Shelter of Greater Pittsburgh with Anne Steytler in 1974. One of the first six domestic violence response and prevention centers in the United States, the Women's Center helped to pave the way for the creation of similar crisis centers in every state across the nation by piloting programs and services to help women and children affected by intimate partner violence or sexual assault while educating government, law enforcement and medical professionals, as well as the general public about the causes and impact of such violence and potential ways to interrupt and prevent the cyclical problem.

In 1991, she was recognized for her contributions to society by the American Institute for Public Service as one of its Jefferson Awards for Public Service recipients. Interviewed about her social justice work in 1992, Berliner said:

"The longer you live, the more you can see inequities. You just have to open your eyes. It's up to you whether you pick it up or leave it lay."

== Formative years and family ==
Born in Bellflower, California on June 10, 1920, Ellen Wade was a daughter of an oil well driller. She attended the University of California, Berkeley, where she met her future husband, Arthur Frank Berliner. They were the parents of two sons and two daughters.

She and her family later moved to Mt. Lebanon, Pennsylvania, where she embarked on her social justice career.

== Social justice advocacy and community service ==
During the 1960s, Ellen W. Berliner and a group of friends co-founded The Meeting Place in Pittsburgh's Manchester neighborhood. Initially designed to be a community gathering place, it soon became the site of planning meetings that enabled neighborhood residents to come together with the owners of Otto Dairy to acquire land on which they were able to build a community playground.

Berliner then co-founded the South Hills Association for Racial Equality with Molly Rush. She and Rush fought for civil rights, improved access to public educational opportunities for children and adults, and fair access to safe, affordable housing for residents in and beyond Mt. Lebanon. Berliner also initiated a series of public events, including the "No-Church Church" and community dinners that brought diverse groups together to explore ways to collaborate on a range of civil rights issues and helped to persuade local government leaders to investigate complaints of fair housing violations by area realtors.

In addition, Berliner established an annual tradition for her neighborhood — hosting a pancake breakfast for area children on the final day of school each year. It was held in the front yard of her home, which had become known, by that time, as a safe place for women and children who were experiencing violence in their homes.

During the early 1970s, Berliner collaborated with Anne Steytler to plan, launch and secure non-profit status for the Women's Center & Shelter of Greater Pittsburgh. Using their own money to establish the center, their first planning meeting was held in Berliner's living room. They subsequently rented a small storefront location on West Liberty Avenue in order to open a crisis center for women and children experiencing domestic violence and then secured a $5,000 grant from the Pittsburgh Presbytery to rent a house in Dormont, where they established their first shelter. That shelter initially offered safety for up to six women at a time, and cost roughly two thousand dollars per year to operate. As word of their efforts spread, they began receiving pledges of financial support from area residents, which quickly reached roughly four hundred dollars per month. The Women's Center & Shelter of Pittsburgh was officially incorporated in April 1974.

One of the first six domestic violence response and prevention centers ever created in the United States, the center pioneered programs that helped women and children survive, escape and heal from the cycle of domestic violence and/or sexual assault. As Berliner and Steytler became more familiar with the number of women and children affected by these crimes, they established and operated a telephone hotline to provide victims with a safe way of requesting help. Their initiatives were subsequently used as models for the launch of similar centers and programs by other civic leaders across the nation. From 1975 through 1977, their program provided housing assistance to five hundred and twenty-eight women and three hundred and eleven children. More than fifty percent of those women and children had experienced domestic violence.

By 1979, the Women's Center had a yearly budget of $160,000, which was funded by grants from the federal government, the Allegheny County Board of Public Assistance, the Attorney Generals Public Health Trust, the Hillman Foundation, and the Pittsburgh Foundation, as well as individual donations from area residents. That year, the center's hotline averaged roughly seventy-five calls daily.

Also during this same period, Ellen, Arthur and Lauren Berliner were part of a group of fifty parents, students and other community members who filed suit in the Common Pleas Court of Pennsylvania "to prohibit Mt. Lebanon School District from including prayers in its commencement exercises." Steytler was also one of the plaintiffs.

In 1982, Berliner and Steytler expanded their anti-domestic violence work by developing educational outreach programs for, and lobbying on behalf of the Pennsylvania Coalition Against Violence. In 1983, they lobbied for stronger legal reporting requirements in elder abuse cases and protective services funding for victims of mental and physical abuse. They also planned and implemented the National Day of Unity on October 16, 1982, to commemorate the deaths of women who were killed in domestic violence-related incidents.

By 1992, the Women's Center employed a staff of thirty-five and had an operating budget of $1.5 million. That same year, more than 12,000 calls for assistance were made to the center's hotline. In 1993, more than seven hundred women and children were housed by the center's shelter.

== Alzheimer's disease research and advocacy ==
During the 1970s, Berliner's fifty-eight-year-old husband, Art, was diagnosed with Alzheimer's disease, a progressive neurodegenerative disease that is estimated by the World Health Organization to be the most common cause of dementia cases today. In response, Berliner and her husband began participating in research studies at the University of Pittsburgh Medical Center. She then helped to found an Alzheimer's Association chapter in the Pittsburgh area in 1988.

"If you spend the time, the touch of your hand and the fact they're being hugged when you're the only one who hugs them.... They know, if you stay long enough," she said in 1992 of her husband and others with family members who had been diagnosed with the disease. After her husband died from complications related to the disease, she continued to volunteer with the association for much of the remainder of her life.

Her friend and collaborator, Anne Steytler, was also subsequently diagnosed with Alzheimer's, and died from complications related to the disease in 2010.

== Death ==
Hospitalized in early March 2011 with an abdominal aortic aneurysm, Berliner died at the age of ninety from that medical condition at St. Clair Hospital in Mt. Lebanon, Pennsylvania on March 4.

== Awards and other honors ==
Berliner was the recipient of multiple awards during her lifetime, including the:

- Humanitarian of the Year Award (with Anne Steytler), Greater Pittsburgh Unitarian Universalist Council, 1983
- Jefferson Award for Public Service, American Institute for Public Service, 1991
- Outstanding Citizen of the Year Award, Pittsburgh Post-Gazette, 1991
- Peace and Justice Award, Thomas Merton Center, 1996

== See also ==
- List of civil rights leaders
- List of feminists
- List of women's rights activists
