= Anne Steytler =

American activist and feminist

Anne W. Steytler
- Born: Charlotte Anne Webster; January 10, 1921; Milwaukee, Wisconsin, United States
- Died: September 13, 2010 (aged 89); Pennsylvania, United States
- Occupations: Social worker, social justice advocate and peace activist
- Years active: 1960s – 2010
- Notable work: Co-founder, with Ellen Berliner, of the Women's Center & Shelter of Greater Pittsburgh
- Spouse: Edmund John Steytler (m. 1951)
- Parent(s): Royden Webster and Jessie E. (Beebe) Webster

Anne W. Steytler (1921–2010) was an American activist and feminist who became known for her pioneering social justice work. She and Ellen Berliner co-founded the Women's Center & Shelter of Greater Pittsburgh in 1974. One of the first six domestic violence response and prevention centers in the United States, the Women's Center helped to pave the way for the creation of similar help centers in every state across the nation by piloting programs and services to help women and children affected by intimate partner violence and/or sexual assault while educating government, law enforcement, medical professionals, and the general public about the causes and impact of such violence and potential ways to interrupt and prevent the cyclical problem.

In 2004, she was presented with the Benjamin Rush Award for her contributions to society and the field of social work.

== Formative years and family ==
Born in Milwaukee, Wisconsin on January 10, 1921, Anne Steytler earned her first master's degree from the University of Wisconsin.

Following her early professional years as a teacher and brief residencies in North Carolina, Kentucky, Virginia, and Cleveland, Ohio, where she earned a second master's degree from Case Western Reserve University in 1967, she relocated to the Pittsburgh region in the Commonwealth of Pennsylvania, where she remained for the duration of her life.

A longtime resident of Pittsburgh's Allegheny-West neighborhood with her husband, Edmund Steytler, a professor of history at Point Park College (now Point Park University), she was a mother of three daughters and one son.

== Social work career and social justice activism ==
After completing her master's degree in social work and relocating to Pennsylvania, Steytler embarked on a career in social work.

During the early 1970s, Steytler provided marriage counseling services to adults in the Greater Pittsburgh area. She also collaborated with Ellen Berliner to plan, launch and secure non-profit status for the Women's Center & Shelter of Greater Pittsburgh. Using their own money to establish the center, their first planning meeting was held in Berliner's living room. They subsequently rented a small storefront location on West Liberty Avenue in order to open a crisis center for women and children experiencing domestic violence and then secured a $5,000 grant from the Pittsburgh Presbytery to rent a house in Dormont, where they established their first shelter. That shelter initially offered safety for up to six women at a time, and cost roughly two thousand dollars per year to operate. As word of their efforts spread, they began receiving pledges of financial support from area residents, which quickly reached roughly four hundred dollars per month. The Women's Center & Shelter of Pittsburgh was officially incorporated in April 1974.

One of the first six domestic violence response and prevention centers ever created in the United States, the center pioneered programs that helped women and children survive, escape and heal from the cycle of domestic violence and/or sexual assault. As Berliner and Steytler became more familiar with the number of women and children affected by these crimes, they established and operated a telephone hotline to provide victims with a safe way of requesting help. Their initiatives were subsequently used as models for the launch of similar centers and programs by other civic leaders across the nation. From 1975 through 1977, their program provided housing assistance to five hundred and twenty-eight women and three hundred and eleven children. More than fifty percent of those women and children had experienced domestic violence.

By 1979, the center had a yearly budget of $160,000, which was funded by grants from the federal government, the Allegheny County Board of Public Assistance, the Attorney Generals Public Health Trust, the Hillman Foundation, and the Pittsburgh Foundation, as well as individual donations from area residents. That year, the center's hotline averaged roughly seventy-five calls daily. By 1992, the center employed a staff of thirty-five and had an operating budget of $1.5 million. That year, more than twelve thousand calls for assistance were made to the center's hotline. In 1993, more than seven hundred women and children were housed by the center's shelter.

Also during this same period, Steytler and the Berliner family were part of a group of fifty parents, students and other community members who filed suit in the Common Pleas Court of Pennsylvania "to prohibit Mt. Lebanon School District from including prayers in its commencement exercises."

Steytler was also active with the National Organization for Women, serving on the board of directors of NOW's North Hills, Pennsylvania chapter and as secretary of that board during the early 1980s. In 1984, she was a consultant to the Parent & Child Guidance Center in Castle Shannon, Pennsylvania, and presented a six-part training series for parents of pre-school and elementary school-aged children at the Mt. Lebanon United Methodist Church.

In 1982, Steytler and Berliner expanded their anti-domestic violence work by developing educational outreach programs for, and lobbying on behalf of, the Pennsylvania Coalition Against Violence. In 1983, they lobbied local and state officials for stronger legal reporting requirements in elder abuse cases and protective services funding for victims of mental and physical abuse. They also planned and implemented the National Day of Unity in October 1982 to commemorate the deaths of women who were killed in domestic violence-related incidents.

== Later years ==
Still active as a practicing social worker during her early seventies, Steytler also continued to be an advocate for LGBTQ and women's rights. In 1992, she was employed as a staff therapist with the Persad Center in Bloomfield.

A decades-long lay leader at the Unitarian Universalist Church of the South Hills in Mt. Lebanon, Pennsylvania (also known as the Sunnyhill Church), she officiated at wedding ceremonies there with her longtime friend, Bea Carter, and remained active with the Thomas Merton Center, serving on its board of directors.

She was preceded in death by her husband, Edmund, who died from pneumonia at the age of seventy-six on May 26, 1998, at the Forbes Nursing Center in East Liberty.

== Illness and death ==
Diagnosed with Alzheimer's disease during the last decade of her life, Anne Steytler died from complications related to that disease on September 13, 2010. She was eighty-nine years old. Her memorial service was held at the Sunnyhill Church in Mt. Lebanon on October 9 of that same year.

== Awards and other honors ==
Steytler was the recipient of multiple awards during her lifetime, including the:

- Humanitarian of the Year Award (with Ellen Berliner), Greater Pittsburgh Unitarian Universalist Council, 1983;
- New Person Award, Thomas Merton Center, 1996;
- JC Penney Golden Rule Award 1997;
- Jefferson Award for Public Service, American Institute for Public Service, 1998; and the
- Benjamin Rush Award for outstanding health services, 2004.

== See also ==
- List of civil rights leaders
- List of feminists
- List of women's rights activists
