= Rape law in Alabama =

Rape in Alabama is currently defined across three sections of its Criminal Code: Definitions, Rape in the First Degree, and Rape in the Second Degree. Each section addresses components of the crime such as age, sentencing, the genders of the individuals involved, and the acts involved.

== Alabama rape law in the present ==
Currently, the Code of Alabama provides the following Definitions relating to sexual offenses:

"The following definitions apply in this article:

- "(1) SEXUAL INTERCOURSE. Such term has its ordinary meaning and occurs upon any penetration, however slight; emission is not required."
- "(2) DEVIATE SEXUAL INTERCOURSE. Any act of sexual gratification between persons not married to each other involving the sex organs of one person and the mouth or anus of another."
- "(3) SEXUAL CONTACT. Any touching of the sexual or other intimate parts of a person not married to the actor, done for the purpose of gratifying the sexual desire of either party."
- "(4) FEMALE. Any female person."
- "(5) MENTALLY DEFECTIVE. Such term means that a person suffers from a mental disease or defect which renders him incapable of appraising the nature of his conduct.
- "(6) MENTALLY INCAPACITATED. Such term means that a person is rendered temporarily incapable of appraising or controlling his conduct owing to the influence of a narcotic or intoxicating substance administered to him without his consent, or to any other incapacitating act committed upon him without his consent."
- "(7) PHYSICALLY HELPLESS. Such term means that a person is unconscious or for any other reason is physically unable to communicate unwillingness to an act."
- "(8) FORCIBLE COMPULSION. Physical force that overcomes earnest resistance or a threat, express or implied, that places a person in fear of immediate death or serious physical injury to himself or another person."

The current Code of Alabama codifies Rape in the First Degree as:

"(a) A person commits the crime of rape in the first degree if:

- (1) He or she engages in sexual intercourse with a member of the opposite sex by forcible compulsion; or
- (2) He or she engages in sexual intercourse with a member of the opposite sex who is incapable of consent by reason of being physically helpless or mentally incapacitated; or
- (3) He or she, being 16 years or older, engages in sexual intercourse with a member of the opposite sex who is less than 12 years old.

(b) Rape in the first degree is a Class A felony."

The current Code of Alabama codifies Rape in the Second Degree as:

"(a) A person commits the crime of rape in the second degree if:

- (1) Being 16 years or older, he or she engages in sexual intercourse with a member of the opposite sex less than 16 and more than 12 years old, provided, however, the actor is at least two years older than the member of the opposite sex.
- (2) He or she engages in sexual intercourse with a member of the opposite sex who is incapable of consent by reason of being mentally defective.

(b) Rape in the second degree is a Class B felony."

The statutory definition of rape, and many of the terms used to define rape, have varied over the years, as the Alabama legislature has amended its criminal code frequently. Any understanding of the statutory prohibitions of rape is not complete without the common law application of the code, but that is beyond the scope of this article.

There is currently a House Bill being considered by the Alabama Legislature that, if adopted, would significantly amend Rape Law in Alabama.

== Legislative history, 1807-1852 ==
Even before Alabama was a State, members of its legislature (as part of the Mississippi Territory) adopted an Act prohibiting rape. Across the next century, as Alabama joined the United States and its legislature codified and re-codified its laws, Alabama's prohibition of rape, and understanding of what constituted rape, transformed.

Alabama's earliest prohibition of rape provided a sentence of death, although it then limited the sentence to life imprisonment.

=== 1807 Act for the Punishment of Crimes and Misdemeanors ===
In 1807, before Alabama became a state, the Legislative Council and House of Representatives of the Mississippi Territory passed the Act for the Punishment of Crimes and Misdemeanors. The Act was originally passed in June 1802, but was "re-enacted with some amendments" as Act No. 6 of 1807.

The Act for the Punishment of Crimes and Misdemeanors of 1807 prohibited rape:

"And be it further enacted, That every person who shall commit the crime of rape, and be thereof convicted, shall suffer death."

==== Amendments of the Mississippi Territory legislative body ====
The Legislative Council and House of Representatives of the Mississippi Territory amended this Act two times before Alabama became a Territory, but neither of the amendments changed the language of the section prohibiting rape.

==== Amendments of the Alabama Territory legislative body ====
In 1817, U.S. Congress created the Alabama Territory when it divided the Mississippi Territory and admitted Mississippi into the union as a State. The Legislative Council and House of Representatives of the Alabama Territory passed one amendment of the Act for the Punishment of Crimes and Misdemeanors before Alabama became a State, but it did not change the language of the section prohibiting rape.

=== 1841 penal code ===
After Alabama became a state in 1819, the Alabama Legislature did not change the language of the section of the Act for the Punishment of Crimes and Misdemeanors prohibiting rape until 1841. The Alabama Legislature did add a new section to the Act, stating that it is the "duty of the general assembly, as soon as circumstances will permit, to form a penal code...."

In 1841, the General Assembly of Alabama considered Act No. 11, titled "An Act regulating punishments under the penitentiary system." It was adopted as the penal code on January 9, 1841:

"Be it enacted, &c. That, for the government and management of the penitentiary of this state, and to adapt our criminal proceedings and punishments to such system, the provisions...are hereby adopted and made of force, as a part of the laws of this state...."

The 1841 Alabama Penal Code codified rape, removing the 1807 Act's sentence of death for those convicted:

"Any person, who shall commit the crime of rape and be convicted thereof, shall be punished by imprisonment in the penitentiary for life."

The 1841 Alabama Penal Code also added entirely new sections, defining rape of a (female) child less than ten years old as distinctive from rape of a female older than ten years, defining rape that involves drugging, and clarifying that penetration alone (not emission) is sufficient evidence of the crime. The 1841 Alabama Penal Code codified "carnal knowledge of woman above 10 years, by administering substance to produce stupor, &c.":

"Every person, who shall have carnal knowledge of any woman above the age of ten years without her consent, by administering to her any substance, either solid or liquid, which shall produce such stupor, or such imbecility of mind, or weakness of body, as to prevent effectual resistance, shall, upon conviction, be punished by imprisonment in the penitentiary for life."

The 1841 Alabama Penal Code codified "In prosecutions for rape, what sufficient":

"In prosecutions for rape, the act being shown to have been committed forcibly and against the consent of the woman, the proof of penetration shall be deemed sufficient evidence of the commission of the crime."

The 1841 Alabama Penal Code codified "carnal knowledge of female under 10 years":

"Every person, who shall carnally know, or abuse in the attempt to carnally know, any female child under the age of ten years, shall, on conviction, be punished by imprisonment in the penitentiary for life."

== Legislative history, 1852-1907 ==
While 1841 brought the first Penal Code of Alabama, 1852 brought the first Code of Law for Alabama. From there, the Alabama Legislature continued to make significant revisions of its penal code, within the Code of Alabama, through to the new century.

Over the years, the Alabama Legislature added the death penalty back into many of its sections prohibiting rape. It also added, and ultimately removed, a punishment of hard labor, and clarified that the jury was responsible for determining the sentence of those convicted. A few new sections were added during this period of legislative history prohibiting the rape and attempted rape of a married woman by personating her husband. At the turn of the century, the Legislature also began to shift the age boundaries distinguishing a female child from an adult woman for the purposes of sentencing.

=== 1852 Code of Alabama ===
In 1852, the General Assembly of Alabama considered Act No. 9, which was intended "[t]o provide for the adoption, printing and distribution of the Code of Alabama." The Governor approved the Act's passage on February 5, 1852, thereby adopting the first Code of Alabama.

The 1852 Code of Alabama slightly amended the language pertaining to rape (additions underlined; removals struck through):

"Any person~~, who shall commit~~ convicted of the crime of rape ~~and be convicted thereof, shall be punished by imprisonment~~ must be imprisoned in the penitentiary for life."

The 1852 Code of Alabama slightly amended the language pertaining to "carnal knowledge of woman above ten years, by administering drugs, etc.; how punished" (additions underlined; removals struck through):

"~~Every~~ Any person~~,~~ who ~~shall have~~ has carnal knowledge of any ~~woman~~ female above the age of ten years, without her consent, by administering to her any substance, ~~either solid or liquid,~~ which ~~shall~~ produces such stupor, ~~or such~~ imbecility of mind, or weakness of body, as to prevent effectual resistance, ~~shall~~ must, ~~up~~on conviction, be ~~punished by imprisonment~~ imprisoned in the penitentiary for life."

The 1852 Code of Alabama entirely removed the code section from the 1841 Penal Code entitled "In prosecutions for rape, what sufficient." The 1852 Code of Alabama slightly amended the language pertaining to "carnally knowing female under ten years; how punished" (additions underlined; removals struck through):

"~~Every~~ Any person~~,~~ who ~~shall~~ carnally knows, or abuses, in the attempt ~~to~~ carnally to know, ~~any~~ a female ~~child~~ under the age of ten years, ~~shall~~ must, on conviction, be ~~punished by imprisonment~~ imprisoned in the penitentiary for life."

=== 1866 penal code ===
In 1866, the General Assembly of Alabama adopted a re-organized and amended Penal Code. The Governor approved the Penal Code on February 23, 1866.

Some time between the 1852 Code of Alabama, and the adoption of the 1866 Penal Code, the General Assembly added a few sections pertaining to rape and related offenses.

The 1866 Penal Code codified rape, assigning the jury the responsibility of selecting the sentence, re-introducing the death sentence (removed in the 1841 Penal Code), and adding a new punishment of hard labor for life (additions underlined; removals struck through):

"Any person, ~~convicted~~ who is guilty of the crime of rape, must, on conviction, be punished, at the discretion of the jury, either by death, or by imprisonment ~~imprisoned~~ in the penitentiary for life, or by hard labor for the county for life."

The 1866 Penal Code amended "Carnal knowledge of woman by administering drugs, &c." by assigning the jury the responsibility of selecting the sentence, and adding the death sentence and hard labor for life as punishments (additions underlined; removals struck through):

"Any person, who has carnal knowledge of any female above ~~the age of~~ ten years of age, without her consent, by administering to her any drug, or other substance, which produces such stupor, imbecility of mind, or weakness of body, as to prevent effectual resistance, must, on conviction, be punished, at the discretion of the jury, either by death, or by imprisonment ~~imprisoned~~ in the penitentiary for life, or by hard labor for the county for life."

The 1866 Penal Code amended "Carnal knowledge of female under ten years of age" by assigning the jury the responsibility of selecting the sentence, and adding the death sentence and hard labor for life as punishments (additions underlined; removals struck through):

"Any person who has carnal knowledge of any ~~carnally knows, or abuses, in the attempt carnally to know, a~~ female under the age of ten years, or abuses such female in the attempt to have carnal knowledge of her, must, on conviction, be punished, at the discretion of the jury, either by death, or by imprisonment ~~imprisoned~~ in the penitentiary for life, or by hard labor for the county for life."

The 1866 Penal Code (or amendments made between the 1852 Code of Alabama and the 1866 Penal Code) added a new section "Carnal knowledge of married woman by falsely personating husband" (additions underlined):

"Any person who falsely personates the husband of any married woman, and thereby deceives her, and, by means of such deception, gains access to her, and has carnal knowledge of her, must, on conviction, be punished, at the discretion of the jury, either by death, or by imprisonment in the penitentiary, or hard labor for the county, for not less than ten years; but no conviction must be had, under this section, on the unsupported evidence of the woman alone."

The 1866 Penal Code (or amendments made between the 1852 Code of Alabama and the 1866 Penal Code) added a new section "Attempt to have carnal knowledge of married woman by such deception" (additions underlined):

"Any person who falsely personates the husband of any married woman, and thereby gains access to her, with the intent to have carnal knowledge of her, must, on conviction, be fined not less than five hundred dollars; and may also be imprisoned in the county jail, or sentenced to hard labor for the county, for not more than twelve months."

=== 1867 Revised Code of Alabama ===
In 1867, the General Assembly of Alabama considered and approved Act No. 662, an Act "[t]o provide for the adoption, printing and distribution of the Revised Code of Alabama" (approved February 19, 1867). The 1867 Revised Code of Alabama included a codified Penal Code.

The 1867 Revised Code of Alabama made no substantive changes to the section prohibiting rape; it only removed three commas (removals struck through):

"Any person~~,~~ who is guilty of the crime of rape, must~~,~~ on conviction~~,~~ be punished, at the discretion of the jury, either by death, or by imprisonment in the penitentiary for life, or by hard labor for the county for life."

The 1867 Revised Code of Alabama also made no substantive changes to the section prohibiting "Carnal knowledge of woman by administering drugs, &c.," only removing two commas (removals struck through):

"Any person~~,~~ who has carnal knowledge of any female above ten years of age, without her consent, by administering to her any drug, or other substance, which produces such stupor, imbecility of mind, or weakness of body, as to prevent effectual resistance, must~~,~~ on conviction, be punished, at the discretion of the jury, either by death, or by imprisonment in the penitentiary for life, or by hard labor for the county for life."

The 1867 Revised Code of Alabama also made no substantive changes to the section prohibiting "Carnal knowledge of female under ten years of age," only removing two commas (removals struck through):

"Any person who has carnal knowledge of any female under the age of ten years, or abuses such female in the attempt to have carnal knowledge of her, must~~,~~ on conviction~~,~~ be punished, at the discretion of the jury, either by death, or by imprisonment in the penitentiary for life, or by hard labor for the county for life."

The 1867 Revised Code of Alabama made no changes, substantive or otherwise, to the sections introduced in the 1866 Penal Code prohibiting "Carnal knowledge of married woman by falsely personating husband" and "Attempt to have carnal knowledge of married woman by such deception."

=== 1876 Code of Alabama ===
In its 1876-77 General Session, the General Assembly of Alabama considered and approved Act No. 42, intended "[t]o adopt a Code of Law for the State of Alabama" (approved February 2, 1877). This Act codified the 1876 Code of Alabama, which included a Criminal Code.

The 1876 Code of Alabama made no substantive changes to the section prohibiting rape, only adding in two commas it had removed in the 1867 Revised Code (on either side of "on conviction") (removals struck through):

"Any person who is guilty of the crime of rape, must, on conviction, be punished, at the discretion of the jury, either by death, or by imprisonment in the penitentiary for life, or by hard labor for the county for life."

The 1876 Code of Alabama also made no substantive changes to the section prohibiting "Carnal knowledge of woman by administering drugs, &c.," only adding one comma (after "must"):

"Any person who has carnal knowledge of any female above ten years of age, without her consent, by administering to her any drug, or other substance, which produces such stupor, imbecility of mind, or weakness of body, as to prevent effectual resistance, must, on conviction, be punished, at the discretion of the jury, either by death, or by imprisonment in the penitentiary for life, or by hard labor for the county for life."

The 1876 Code of Alabama also made no substantive changes to the section prohibiting "Carnal knowledge of female under ten years of age," only adding two commas (on either side of "on conviction"):

"Any person who has carnal knowledge of any female under the age of ten years, or abuses such female in the attempt to have carnal knowledge of her, must, on conviction, be punished, at the discretion of the jury, either by death, or by imprisonment in the penitentiary for life, or by hard labor for the county for life."

The 1876 Code of Alabama made no changes, substantive or otherwise, to the sections introduced in the 1866 Penal Code prohibiting "Carnal knowledge of married woman by falsely personating husband" and "Attempt to have carnal knowledge of married woman by such deception."

=== 1886 Code of Alabama ===
In its 1886-87 Regular Session, the General Assembly of Alabama considered and approved Act No. 7 intended "[t]o adopt a Code of Laws for the State of Alabama" (approved February 28, 1887).

The 1886 Code of Alabama retitled, and made a substantive change to the section Punishment of rape, removing the option of "hard labor for the county for life" as a punishment (removals struck through):

"Any person who is guilty of the crime of rape, must, on conviction, be punished, at the discretion of the jury, either by death, or by imprisonment in the penitentiary for life~~, or by hard labor for the county for life~~."

The 1886 Code of Alabama (or amendments enacted between the 1876 Code and the 1886 Code) added an entirely new section, "Proof of rape," reintroducing some of the language from the 1841 Alabama Penal Code (additions from 1876 Code underlined):

"To sustain an indictment for rape, proof of actual penetration is sufficient, when the act is shown to have been committed forcibly and against the consent of the person on whom the offense was committed."

The 1886 Code of Alabama removed hard labor as a potential sentence for "Carnal knowledge of women by administering drug, etc." (removals struck through):

"Any person, who has carnal knowledge of any female above ten years of age, without her consent, by administering to her any drug, or other substance, which produces such stupor, imbecility of mind, or weakness of body, as to prevent effectual resistance, must, on conviction, be punished, at the discretion of the jury, ~~either~~ by death, or by imprisonment in the penitentiary for life~~, or by hard labor for the county for life~~."

The 1886 Code of Alabama removed hard labor as a potential sentence for "Carnal knowledge of female under ten years of age" (removals struck through):

"Any person, who has carnal knowledge of any female under the age of ten years, or abuses such female in the attempt to have carnal knowledge of her, must, on conviction, be punished, at the discretion of the jury, either by death, or by imprisonment in the penitentiary for life~~, or by hard labor for the county for life~~."

The 1886 Code of Alabama removed hard labor as a potential sentence for "Carnal knowledge of married women by falsely personating husband" (removals struck through):

"Any person, who falsely personates the husband of any married woman, and thereby deceives her~~,~~ and, by means of such deception, gains access to her, and has carnal knowledge of her, must, on conviction, be punished, at the discretion of the jury, ~~either~~ by death, or by imprisonment in the penitentiary~~, or hard labor for the county,~~ for not less than ten years; but no conviction must be had~~,~~ under this section~~,~~ on the unsupported evidence of the woman ~~alone~~."

The 1886 Code of Alabama did not adjust the potential hard labor sentence and made only grammatical changes to "Attempt to have carnal knowledge of married woman by such deception" (inserted one comma after "person"; removed two commas, struck through below):

"Any person, who falsely personates the husband of any married woman, and thereby gains access to her~~,~~ with the intent to have carnal knowledge of her, must, on conviction, be fined not less than five hundred dollars~~;~~, and may also be imprisoned in the county jail, or sentenced to hard labor for the county, for not more than twelve months."

=== 1896 Code of Alabama ===
In its 1896-97 Regular Session, the General Assembly of Alabama considered and approved Act No. 480 intended "[t]o adopt a Code of laws for the State of Alabama" (approved February 16, 1897).

The 1896 Code of Alabama amended "Punishment of rape" to adjust the length of potential prison sentences (additions underlined; removals struck through):

"Any person, who is guilty of the crime of rape, must, on conviction, be punished, at the discretion of the jury, ~~either~~ by death, or by imprisonment in the penitentiary for ~~life~~ not less than ten years."

The 1896 Code of Alabama made no amendments, substantial or otherwise, to "Proof of rape." The 1896 Code of Alabama amended "Carnal knowledge of women by administering drug, etc." to raise the age to fourteen and adjust the length of potential prison sentences (additions underlined; removals struck through):

"Any person, who has carnal knowledge of any female above ~~ten~~ fourteen years of age, without her consent, by administering to her any drug~~,~~ or other substance~~,~~ which produces such stupor, imbecility of mind, or weakness of body, as to prevent effectual resistance, must, on conviction, be punished, at the discretion of the jury, by death, or by imprisonment in the penitentiary for ~~life~~ not less than ten years."

The 1896 Code of Alabama changed the title to reflect the age change and amended "Carnal knowledge of female under fourteen years of age" to raise the age to fourteen and adjust the length of potential prison sentences (additions underlined; removals struck through):

"Any person, who has carnal knowledge of any female under fourteen years of age ~~the age of ten years~~, or abuses such female in the attempt to have carnal knowledge of her, must, on conviction, be punished, at the discretion of the jury, either by death, or by imprisonment in the penitentiary for ~~life~~ for not less than ten years."

The 1896 Code of Alabama codified an entirely new section "Carnal knowledge of girl over ten and under fourteen years of age," which had been added to the Penal Code by the General Assembly of Alabama on February 15, 1897, by its adoption of Act No. 404 (enacted "For the better protection of Girls"), defining "Age of consent." The language in the 1896 Code is as follows:

"Any person, who has carnal knowledge of any girl over ten and under fourteen years of age, or abuses such girl in the attempt to have carnal knowledge of her, must, on conviction, be punished by a fine of not less than fifty, nor more than five hundred dollars, and may be imprisoned in the county jail for six months. This section, however, shall not apply to boys under sixteen years of age.”

The 1896 Code of Alabama did not amend "Carnal knowledge of married women by falsely personating husband" or "Attempt to have carnal knowledge of married woman by such deception."

== Legislative history, 1907-1975 ==
The Alabama Legislature re-codified its Code only three times between 1907 and 1975, when it made substantial and extreme edits in its 1975 Code, which is the one it still uses today.

This period of legislative history is marked by continued shift of the age range recognized as a female child, and the age used to distinguish between young women and adult women. Compared to earlier periods of legislative history, this one contains the least significant edits to Alabama rape law.

=== 1907 Code of Alabama ===
In 1907, the Alabama Legislature considered and approved Act No. 409 intended "[t]o adopt a code of laws for the State of Alabama" (approved July 27, 1907).

The 1907 Code of Alabama made only minor amendments to "Punishment of rape" (removals struck through):

"Any person~~,~~ who is guilty of the crime of rape~~,~~ must, on conviction, be punished, at the discretion of the jury, by death~~,~~ or ~~by~~ imprisonment in the penitentiary for not less than ten years."

The 1907 Code of Alabama made no substantive amendments to "Proof of rape" or "Carnal knowledge of women by administering drug, etc." The 1907 Code of Alabama changed the title to reflect the age change and amended "Carnal knowledge of female under twelve years of age" to lower the age to twelve (additions underlined; removals struck through):

"Any person~~,~~ who has carnal knowledge of any ~~female~~ girl under ~~fourteen~~ twelve years of age, or abuses such ~~female~~ girl in the attempt to have carnal knowledge of her, must, on conviction, be punished, at the discretion of the jury, either by death~~,~~ or by imprisonment in the penitentiary for not less than ten years."

The 1907 Code of Alabama changed the title to reflect the age change and amended "Carnal knowledge of girl over twelve and under fourteen years of age" to raise the age to twelve (additions underlined; removals struck through):

"Any person~~,~~ who has carnal knowledge of any girl over ~~ten~~ twelve and under fourteen years of age, or abuses such girl in the attempt to have carnal knowledge of her, must, on conviction, be punished by a fine of not less than fifty, nor more than five hundred dollars, and may be imprisoned in the county jail for not more than six months. This section, however, shall not apply to boys under sixteen years of age.”

The 1907 Code of Alabama did not amend "Carnal knowledge of married women by falsely personating husband" or "Attempt to have carnal knowledge of married woman by such deception."

=== 1923 Code of Alabama ===
In 1923, the Alabama Legislature considered and approved Act No. 160 (sponsored by Representative Merrill) intended "[t]o adopt a Code of Laws for the State of Alabama" (approved August 17, 1923).

The 1923 Code of Alabama did not amend "Punishment of rape" or "Proof of rape," "Carnal knowledge of girl under twelve years of age," "Carnal knowledge of married woman by falsely personating husband," or "Attempt to have carnal knowledge of married woman by such deception."

The 1923 Code of Alabama amended "Carnal knowledge of woman or girl by administering drug, etc." by changing each use of "female" to "woman or girl" (additions underlined; removals struck through):

"Any person who has carnal knowledge of any ~~female~~ woman or girl above fourteen years of age, without her consent, by administering to her any drug or other substance which produces such stupor, imbecility of mind~~,~~ or weakness of body, as to prevent effectual resistance, must, on conviction, be punished~~,~~ at the discretion of the jury, by death~~,~~ or by imprisonment in the penitentiary for not less than ten years."

The 1923 Code of Alabama changed the title to reflect the age change and amended "Carnal knowledge of girl over twelve and under sixteen years of age" to raise the age to sixteen and to change the potential prison sentence:

"Any person~~,~~ who has carnal knowledge of any girl over twelve and under ~~fourteen~~ sixteen years of age, or abuses such girl in the attempt to have carnal knowledge of her, must, on conviction, be punished at the discretion of the jury, by imprisonment in the penitentiary for not less than two nor more than ten years. ~~by a fine of not less than fifty, nor more than five hundred dollars, and may be imprisoned in the county jail for not more than six months.~~ This section, however, shall not apply to boys under sixteen years of age.”

=== 1940 Code of Alabama ===
In 1940, the Alabama Legislature considered and approved Act No. 628 (sponsored by Representative Welch) intended "[t]o adopt a Code of Laws for the State of Alabama" (approved July 2, 1940).

The 1940 Code of Alabama slightly amended "Punishment of rape" (additions underlined; removals struck through):

"Any person who is guilty of the crime of rape ~~must~~ shall, on conviction, be punished, at the discretion of the jury, by death or imprisonment in the penitentiary for not less than ten years."

The 1940 Code of Alabama did amend "Carnal knowledge of woman or girl by administering drug, etc." in the same way it amended "Punishment of rape," by changing "must" to "shall."

The 1940 Code of Alabama did not amend "Proof of rape," "Carnal knowledge of girl under twelve years of age," "Carnal knowledge of girl over twelve and under sixteen years of age," "Carnal knowledge of married woman by falsely personating husband," or "Attempt to have carnal knowledge of married woman by such deception."

== The 1975 Code of Alabama and amendments through 2000 ==
Alabama's 1975 Code is the one it still uses today. In 1977, the Alabama Legislature repealed much of the 1975 Code's Criminal Code and re-organized and re-codified it. Since then, significant and substantial amendments have affects Alabama Law's definition of and prohibition of rape. One of the most significant changes was that the Legislature removed the death penalty entirely from the sections pertaining to rape as part of its 1975 re-codification.

Post-1977 reorganization, the changes the Legislature has continued to make reflect its emphasis on the gender of the parties involved, marked by its explicit additions and removals of gendered terms such as "male" and "female" through various amendments from 1977 to 2000.

=== 1975 Code of Alabama ===
In 1977, the Alabama legislature considered and adopted Act No. 20, introduced as H. 100 by Representatives Manley, Armstrong, McCluskey, Clark, and Harris intended "[t]o adopt a Code of laws for the State of Alabama" on February 15, 1977. This became the 1975 Code of Alabama (despite its being adopted in 1977).

The 1975 Code of Alabama amended "Punishment" (of rape) to remove the jury's explicit role in determining sentences and to remove the death penalty as an available sentence (additions underlined; removals struck through):

"Any person who is guilty of the crime of rape shall, on conviction, be punished~~, at the discretion of the jury, by death or~~ imprisonment in the penitentiary for not less than ten years, or as otherwise specified by law."

The 1975 Code of Alabama did not amend "Proof of rape" or "Carnal knowledge -- By falsely personating husband -- Attempts." The 1975 Code of Alabama amended "Carnal knowledge -- By administering drug, etc." to remove the jury's explicit role in determining sentences and to remove the death penalty as an available sentence (additions underlined; removals struck through):

"Any person who has carnal knowledge of any woman or girl above ~~fourteen~~ 14 years of age, without her consent, by administering to her any drug or other substance which produces such stupor, imbecility of mind or weakness of body~~,~~ as to prevent effectual resistance, shall, on conviction, be punished ~~at the discretion of the jury, by death or~~ by imprisonment in the penitentiary for not less than ten years."

The 1975 Code of Alabama amended "Carnal knowledge -- Girl under 12 years of age" to remove the jury's explicit role in determining sentences and to remove the death penalty as an available sentence (additions underlined; removals struck through):

"Any person who has carnal knowledge of any girl under ~~twelve~~ 12 years of age, or abuses such girl in the attempt to have carnal knowledge of her, shall, on conviction, be punished~~, at the discretion of the jury, either by death or~~ by imprisonment in the penitentiary for not less than ~~ten~~ 10 years, or as otherwise specified by law."

The 1975 Code of Alabama amended "Carnal knowledge -- Girl over 12 and under 16 years of age" to add a marriage exception, to remove the jury's explicit role in determining sentences, and to remove the death penalty as an available sentence (additions underlined; removals struck through):

"Except where the parties are lawfully married, ~~A~~any person who has carnal knowledge of any girl over ~~twelve~~ 12 and under ~~sixteen~~ 16 years of age, or abuses such girl in the attempt to have carnal knowledge of her, ~~must~~ shall, on conviction, be punished at the discretion of the jury, by imprisonment in the penitentiary for not less than two nor more than ten years. This section, however, shall not apply to boys under sixteen years of age.”

The 1975 Code of Alabama amended "Carnal knowledge -- By falsely personating husband -- Generally" to remove the jury's explicit role in determining sentences and to remove the death penalty as an available sentence (additions underlined; removals struck through):

"Any person who falsely personates the husband of any married woman, and thereby deceives her, and by means of such deception, gains access to her, and has carnal knowledge of her, ~~must~~ shall, on conviction, be punished, ~~at the discretion of the jury, by death, or~~ by imprisonment in the penitentiary for not less than ~~ten~~ 10 years; but no conviction must be had under this section~~,~~ on the unsupported evidence of the woman."

=== 1977 criminal code overhaul ===
In 1977, the Alabama legislature enacted a set of laws known as the "Alabama Criminal Code." The Act (No. 607) was originally introduced in the Alabama Senate by Senator Finis St. John as S. 33, and was approved May 16, 1977 at 6:00 PM.

The 1977 Alabama Criminal Code was intended:

"[t]o provide an entirely new criminal code for the State of Alabama; defining offenses, fixing punishment; repealing numerous specific code sections and statutes that conflict herewith as well as all other laws that conflict with this Act."

It repealed and replaced much of the criminal code in the 1975 Code of Alabama. All of the sections from the 1975 Code of Alabama pertaining to rape were repealed, and replaced and separated into new sections.

Code Section Changes from 1975 Code of Alabama to 1977 Alabama Criminal Code, Related to Rape
1975 Code of Alabama	1977 Alabama Criminal Code
13-1-130 through -136	13A-6-61, 13A-6-62, 13A-6-70

The 1977 Alabama Criminal Code adopted the following definitions:

"(a) 'Sexual intercourse' has its ordinary meaning and occurs upon any penetration, however slight; emission is not required.

(b) 'Deviate sexual intercourse' means any act of sexual gratification between persons not married to each other, involving the sex organs of one person and the mouth or anus of another.

(c) 'Sexual contact' means any touching of the sexual or other intimate parts of a person not married to the actor, done for the purpose of gratifying the sexual desire of either party.

(d) 'Female' means any female person who is not married to the actor. Persons living together in cohabitation are married for purposes of this chapter, regardless of the legal status of their relationship otherwise.

(e) 'Mentally defective' means that a person suffers from a mental disease or defect which renders him incapable of appraising the nature of his conduct.

(f) 'Mentally incapacitated' means that a person is rendered temporarily incapable of appraising or controlling his conduct owing to the influence of a narcotic or intoxicating substance administered to him without his consent, or to any other incapacitating act committed upon him without his consent.

(g) 'Physically helpless' means that a person is unconscious or for any other reason is physically unable to communicate unwillingness to an act.

(h) 'Forcible compulsion' means physical force that overcomes earnest resistance or a threat, express or implied, that places a person in fear of immediate death or serious injury to himself or another person."

The 1977 Acts codified Rape in the First Degree:

"(1) A male commits the crime of rape in the first degree if:

- (a) He engages in sexual intercourse with a female by forcible compulsion; or
- (b) He engages in sexual intercourse with a female who is incapable of consent by reason of being physically helpless or mentally incapacitated; or
- (c) He, being 16 years or older, engages in sexual intercourse with a female who is less than 12 years old.

(2) Rape in the first degree is a Class A felony."

The 1977 Acts codified Rape in the Second Degree:

"(1) A male commits the crime of rape in the second degree if:

- (a) Being 16 years or older, he engages in sexual intercourse with a female less than 16 and more than 12 years old, provided, however, the actor is at least two years older than the female.
- (b) He engages in sexual intercourse with a female who is incapable of consent by reason of being mentally defective.
- (c) A person does not commit [this crime] if he does not know or has no reason to believe the female to be less than 16 years of age or to be mentally defective.

(2) Rape in the second degree is a Class C felony."

=== 1979 amendments: Act No. 79-471 ===
In 1979, the Alabama legislature enacted an Act (No. 79-471) originally introduced in the Alabama Senate by Senators Robertson and Finis St. John (who was then-President Pro Tem of the Senate) as S. 316.

The 1979 Act (No. 79-471) was intended to amend a few dozen sections of the 1977 Alabama Criminal Code (Act No. 607), including the section entitled Rape in the Second Degree.

The 1979 amendments to Rape in the Second Degree made the following changes (additions underlined; removals struck through):

"(1) A ~~male~~ person commits the crime of rape in the second degree if:

- (a) Being 16 years or older, he engages in sexual intercourse with a female less than 16 and more than 12 years old, provided, however, the actor is at least two years older than the female.
- (b) He engages in sexual intercourse with a female who is incapable of consent by reason of being mentally defective.
- ~~(c) A person does not commit [this crime] if he does not know or has no reason to believe the female to be less than 16 years of age or to be mentally defective.~~

(2) Rape in the second degree is a Class C felony."

=== 1987 amendments: Act No. 87-607 ===
In 1987, the Alabama legislature enacted an Act (No. 87-607) originally introduced in the Alabama House by Representatives Blakeney, McMillan, Mikell, Hooper, Breedlove, Layson, Haynes, and Black as H. 386. The Act was entitled "The Retarded Citizens Sexual Protection Act of 1987" and was intended "[t]o provide that the punishment for second degree rape be changed from a Class C to a Class B felony; to amend Code of Alabama, 1975 §13A-6-62(b) accordingly..." and to make similar edits to the Alabama Criminal Code section defining sodomy in the second degree. The Act was approved by the Governor on July 23, 1987 at 2:37 PM and came into effect 90 days later.

The 1987 amendments to Rape in the Second Degree made the following changes (additions underlined; removals struck through):

"(1) A ~~person~~ male commits the crime of rape in the second degree if:

- (a) Being 16 years or older, he engages in sexual intercourse with a female less than 16 and more than 12 years old, provided, however, the actor is at least two years older than the female.
- (b) He engages in sexual intercourse with a female who is incapable of consent by reason of being mentally defective.

(2) Rape in the second degree is a Class ~~C~~ B felony."

=== 1988 amendments: Act No. 88-339 ===
In 1988, the Alabama legislature enacted an Act (No. 88-339) originally introduced in the Alabama House by Representative Buskey (JE) as H. 46. The Act was intended "[t]o amend Section 13A-6-60, Code of Alabama 1975, so as to remove the exemption from criminal responsibility of the spouse for rape and redefine the term 'female' which excludes married victims." The Governor approved the Act on April 28, 1988 at 3:32 PM, and it came into effect immediately upon passage and approval.

The 1988 amendments to Definitions made the following changes (additions underlined; removals struck through):

"(a) ~~'Sexual intercourse'~~ SEXUAL INTERCOURSE. Such term has its ordinary meaning and occurs upon any penetration, however slight; emission is not required.

(b) ~~'Deviate sexual intercourse'~~ DEVIATE SEXUAL INTERCOURSE. ~~means a~~Any act of sexual gratification between persons not married to each other~~,~~ involving the sex organs of one person and the mouth or anus of another.

(c) ~~'Sexual contact'~~ SEXUAL CONTACT. ~~means a~~Any touching of the sexual or other intimate parts of a person not married to the actor, done for the purpose of gratifying the sexual desire of either party.

(d) ~~'Female'~~ FEMALE. ~~means aA~~ny female person. ~~who is not married to the actor. Persons living together in cohabitation are married for purposes of this chapter, regardless of the legal status of their relationship otherwise.~~

(e) ~~'Mentally defective'~~ MENTALLY DEFECTIVE. Such term means that a person suffers from a mental disease or defect which renders him incapable of appraising the nature of his conduct.

(f) ~~'Mentally incapacitated'~~ MENTALLY INCAPACITATED. Such term means that a person is rendered temporarily incapable of appraising or controlling his conduct owing to the influence of a narcotic or intoxicating substance administered to him without his consent, or to any other incapacitating act committed upon him without his consent.

(g) ~~'Physically helpless'~~ PHYSICALLY HELPLESS. Such term means that a person is unconscious or for any other reason is physically unable to communicate unwillingness to an act.

(h) ~~'Forcible compulsion'~~ FORCIBLE COMPULSION. ~~means~~ ~~p~~Physical force that overcomes earnest resistance or a threat, express or implied, that places a person in fear of immediate death or serious injury to himself or another person."

=== 2000 amendments: Act No. 2000-726 ===
In 2000, the Alabama legislature enacted an Act (No. 2000-726), which was originally introduced in the Alabama Senate by Senator Armistead as S.B. No. 415, "Criminal Code —Offenses Involving Danger to the Person —Sexual Offenses —Rape."

The Act was intended "[t]o amend Sections 13A–6–61 and 13A–6–62 of the Code of Alabama 1975; relating to the crimes of rape in the first or second degree; to provide that a female may commit the crimes...." The Governor approved the Act on April 23, 2000 at 4:33 PM, and it came into effect on the first day of the third month following passage and approval.

The 2000 amendments to Rape in the First Degree made the following changes (additions underlined; removals struck through):

"(~~1~~a) A ~~male~~ person commits the crime of rape in the first degree if:

- (~~a~~1) He or she engages in sexual intercourse with a ~~female~~ member of the opposite sex by forcible compulsion; or
- (~~b~~2) He or she engages in sexual intercourse with a ~~female~~ member of the opposite sex who is incapable of consent by reason of being physically helpless or mentally incapacitated; or
- (~~c~~3) He or she, being 16 years or older, engages in sexual intercourse with a ~~female~~ member of the opposite sex who is less than 12 years old.

(~~2~~b) Rape in the first degree is a Class A felony."

The 2000 amendments to Rape in the Second Degree made the following changes (additions underlined; removals struck through):

"(~~1~~a) A ~~male~~ person commits the crime of rape in the second degree if:

- (~~a~~1) Being 16 years or older, he or she engages in sexual intercourse with a ~~female~~ member of the opposite sex less than 16 and more than 12 years old, provided, however, the actor is at least two years older than the ~~female~~ member of the opposite sex.
- (~~b~~2) He or she engages in sexual intercourse with a ~~female~~ member of the opposite sex who is incapable of consent by reason of being mentally defective.

(~~2~~b) Rape in the second degree is a Class B felony."

== Proposed legislation: 2019 ==
The Alabama House of Representatives is currently considering H.B. 496 in its 2019 Regular Session, introduced on April 23, 2019 by Representative England. The House amended H.B. 496 on May 23, 2019, with the most significant edit being the removal of all mentions of, and the text of, Section 15-20A-5, which provided a list of all offenses thereafter defined as a "sex offense."

The changes that this Bill, in its current draft, would make to codified Alabama Rape Law are below:

Section 13A-6-60 "Definitions" (additions underlined; removals struck through):

"The following definitions apply in this article:

"~~(1)~~ (4) SEXUAL INTERCOURSE. Such term has its ordinary meaning and occurs upon any penetration, however slight; emission is not required.

"(3) SEXUAL CONTACT. Any touching of the sexual or other intimate parts of a person ~~not married to the actor,~~ done for the purpose of gratifying the sexual desire of either party. The term does not require skin to skin contact.

"~~(2)~~ (5) ~~DEVIATE SEXUAL INTERCOURSE. Any act of sexual gratification between persons not married to each other involving the sex organs of one person and the mouth or anus of another~~ SODOMY. Any sexual act involving the genitals of one person and the mouth or anus of another person.

"~~(4)~~ (2) ~~FEMALE. Any female person.~~ INCAPACITATED. ~~Such~~ The term includes any of the following:

"a. A person who suffers from a mental or developmental disease or disability which renders the person incapable of appraising the nature of his or her conduct.

"b. A person is temporarily incapable of appraising or controlling his or her conduct due to the influence of a narcotic, anesthetic, or intoxicating substance and the condition was known or should have been reasonably known to the offender.

"c. A person who is unable to give consent or who is unable to communicate an unwillingness to an act because the person is unconscious, asleep, or is otherwise physically limited or unable to communicate.

"~~(5) MENTALLY DEFECTIVE. Such term means that a person suffers from a mental disease or defect which renders him incapable of appraising the nature of his conduct.~~

"~~(6) MENTALLY INCAPACITATED. Such term means that a person is rendered temporarily incapable of appraising or controlling his conduct owing to the influence of a narcotic or intoxicating substance administered to him without his consent, or to any other incapacitating act committed upon him without his consent.~~

"~~(7) PHYSICALLY HELPLESS. Such term means that a person is unconscious or for any other reason is physically unable to communicate unwillingness to an act.~~

"~~(8)~~ (1) FORCIBLE COMPULSION. ~~Physical force that overcomes earnest resistance or a threat, express or implied, that places a person in fear of immediate death or serious physical injury to himself or another person~~ Use or threatened use, whether express or implied, of physical force, violence, confinement, restraint, physical injury, or death to the threatened person or to another person. Factors to be considered in determining an implied threat include, but are not limited to, the respective ages and sizes of the victim and the accused; the respective mental and physical conditions of the victim and the accused; the atmosphere and physical setting in which the incident was alleged to have taken place; the extent to which the accused may have been in a position of authority, domination, or custodial control over the victim; or whether the victim was under duress. Forcible compulsion does not require proof of resistance by the victim.

Section 13A-6-61 "Rape in the First Degree" (additions underlined; removals struck through):

"(a) A person commits the crime of rape in the first degree if he or she does any of the following:

"(1) ~~He or she engages~~ Engages in sexual intercourse with ~~a member of the opposite sex~~ another person by forcible compulsion~~; or~~.

"(2) ~~He or she engages~~ Engages in sexual intercourse with ~~a member of the opposite sex~~ another person who is incapable of consent by reason of being ~~physically helpless or mentally~~ incapacitated~~; or~~.

"(3) ~~He or she, being~~ Being 16 years old or older, engages in sexual intercourse with ~~a member of the opposite sex~~another person who is less than 12 years old.

"(b) Rape in the first degree is a Class A felony.

Section 13A-6-62 "Rape in the Second Degree" (additions underlined; removals struck through):

"(a) A person commits the crime of rape in the second degree if~~:~~,

"~~(1) Being~~ being 16 years old or older, he or she engages in sexual intercourse with ~~a member of the opposite sex~~another person who is 12 years old or older, but less than 16 years old ~~and more than 12 years old~~; provided, however, the actor is at least two years older than the ~~member of the opposite sex~~ other person.

"~~(2) He or she engages in sexual intercourse with a member of the opposite sex who is incapable of consent by reason of being mentally defective.~~

"(b) Rape in the second degree is a Class B felony.

== See also ==
- Rape in the United States
- Rape, Abuse & Incest National Network
- Statutory rape
