= Rainn =

Rainn or RAINN may refer to:

- Rainn Wilson (born 1966), American actor
- Rape, Abuse & Incest National Network
