= Controlling behavior in relationships =

Aspect of personal relationships

Controlling behavior in relationships are behaviors exhibited by an individual who seeks to gain and maintain control over another person. Abusers often utilize tactics such as intimidation or coercion, and may seek personal gain, personal gratification, and the enjoyment of exercising power and control. The victims of this behavior are often subject to psychological, physical, sexual, or financial abuse.

== Overview ==
Manipulators and abusers may control their victims with a range of tactics, including, but not limited to, positive reinforcement (such as praise, superficial charm, flattery, ingratiation, love bombing), negative reinforcement (taking away aversive tasks or items), intermittent or partial reinforcement, psychological punishment (such as silent treatment, threats, emotional blackmail, guilt trips) and traumatic tactics (such as verbal abuse, gaslighting, or explosive anger).

The vulnerabilities of the victim are exploited, with those who are particularly vulnerable being most often selected as targets. Traumatic bonding can occur between abusers and victims as the result of ongoing cycles of abuse in which the intermittent reinforcement of reward and punishment creates powerful emotional bonds (that are resistant to change) and a climate of fear. An attempt may be made to normalize, legitimize, rationalize, deny, or minimize the abusive behavior, or to blame the victim for it.

=== Personality disorders ===
In the study of abnormal psychology, certain personality disorders display characteristics involving the need to gain compliance or control over others: There are many different types of personality disorders and they are often characterized by 3 clusters. Individuals with cluster B personality disorders might be more prone to some negative behaviors related to having power and control over others. Cluster B includes narcissistic, histrionic, borderline, and antisocial personality disorder.

== Law ==
In England and Wales, the Serious Crime Act 2015 created a criminal offense for controlling or coercive behavior in an intimate or family relationship. For the purposes of this offense, the coercive behavior must have been engaged in "repeatedly or continuously". Another element of the offense is that it must have had, or have, a "serious effect" on the victim. One way this can be proved, is that the coercive behavior can be shown to have caused the victim to fear violence on at least two occasions, or for it to have had, or have, a "substantial adverse effect on the victims' day to day activities". The prosecution should be able to show that there was intent to control or coerce the targeted person in some manner. In 2019, the UK government made teaching about what coercive control was a mandatory part of the education syllabus on relationships.

In 2019, Ireland enacted the Domestic Violence Act 2018, which allowed for the practice of coercive control to be identifiable based upon its effects on the victim. On this basis, it was defined as 'any evidence of deterioration in the physical, psychological, or emotional welfare of the applicant or a dependent person which is caused directly by fear of the behavior of the respondent.'.

In the United States, to assist in preventing and stopping domestic violence against children, laws mandate report in specific professions, such as teacher, doctor, or care provider, of any suspected abuse happening in the home. Family law is mostly under the jurisdiction of state and local governments in the United States. As such, states are unequally tackling coercive control through legislation.

Jennifers' Law is a law in the U.S. state of Connecticut that expands the definition of domestic violence to include coercive control. The law is named for two women, both victims of domestic violence: Jennifer Farber Dulos and Jennifer Magnano. It became a law in 2021.

== See also ==
- Battered person syndrome
- Blackmail
- Bullying
- Child grooming
- Coercion
- Control freak
- Cycle of violence
- Domestic violence
- Elder abuse
- Extortion
- Institutional abuse
- Intimate partner violence
- Isolation to facilitate abuse
- Power and Control: Domestic Violence in America
- Psychological abuse
