= Lenore E. Walker =

American psychologist (born 1942)

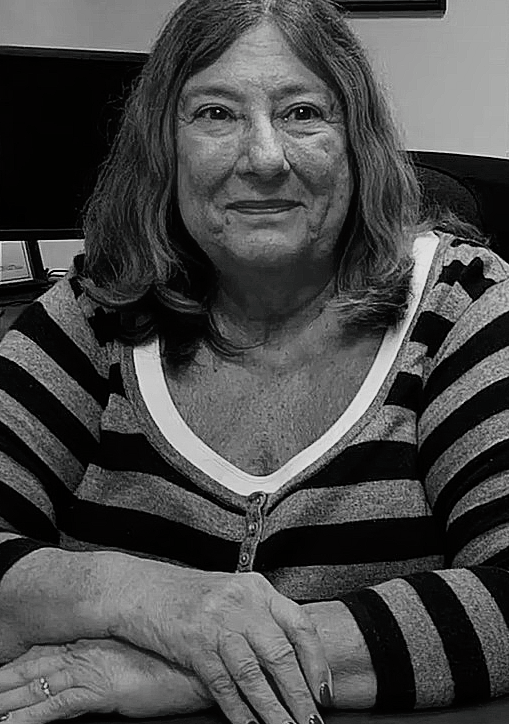
- Dr. Walker in 2016
- Born: Lenore Edna Walker; October 3, 1942 (age 83); New York City, U.S.
- Education: Hunter College of City University New York (B.A.); Nova Southeastern University (M.S.); Rutgers the State University of New Jersey (Ed.D.)
- Occupations: Psychologist, forensic researcher, educator
- Years active: 1964–present
- Notable work: The Battered Woman
- Website: drlenoreewalker.com

Lenore Edna Walker (born 3 October, 1942) is an American psychologist, educator, and author. She is known for her work in domestic violence and the psychology of women, particularly her groundbreaking research on battered women. Walker is a professor emerita at Nova Southeastern University.

Walker gained prominence after publishing the book The Battered Woman in 1979. She also founded the Domestic Violence Institute after helping victims of domestic violence during the 1970s. Walker is credited with introducing the concept of battered woman syndrome and the Cycle of Abuse model, which are widely applied in clinical, legal, and educational settings.

Walker was inducted into the Colorado Women's Hall of Fame in 1987. In 2023, she was awarded the APF Gold Medal for Impact in Psychology in recognition of her transformative contributions to psychology.

== Early life and career ==
Born on October 3, 1942 in New York City, she pursued her education in psychology with a strong devotion to understanding and addressing the social and psychological challenges faced by vulnerable populations. Walker earned her Bachelor's degree from Hunter College in 1964, followed by her Master's from City College of New York and an Ed.D. in school psychology from Rutgers University in 1972. In 2004 she received an M.S. in psychopharmacology from Nova Southeastern University.

After the early stage of her career, Walker directed her attention to the systemic issues surrounding domestic violence. Her work laid a foundation for modern understandings of intimate partner violence (IPV) and its psychological impacts. Walker's most notable contribution came in 1979 with the publication of her book The Battered Woman, where she introduced the concept of the Cycle of Abuse.

=== Battered Woman Syndrome ===
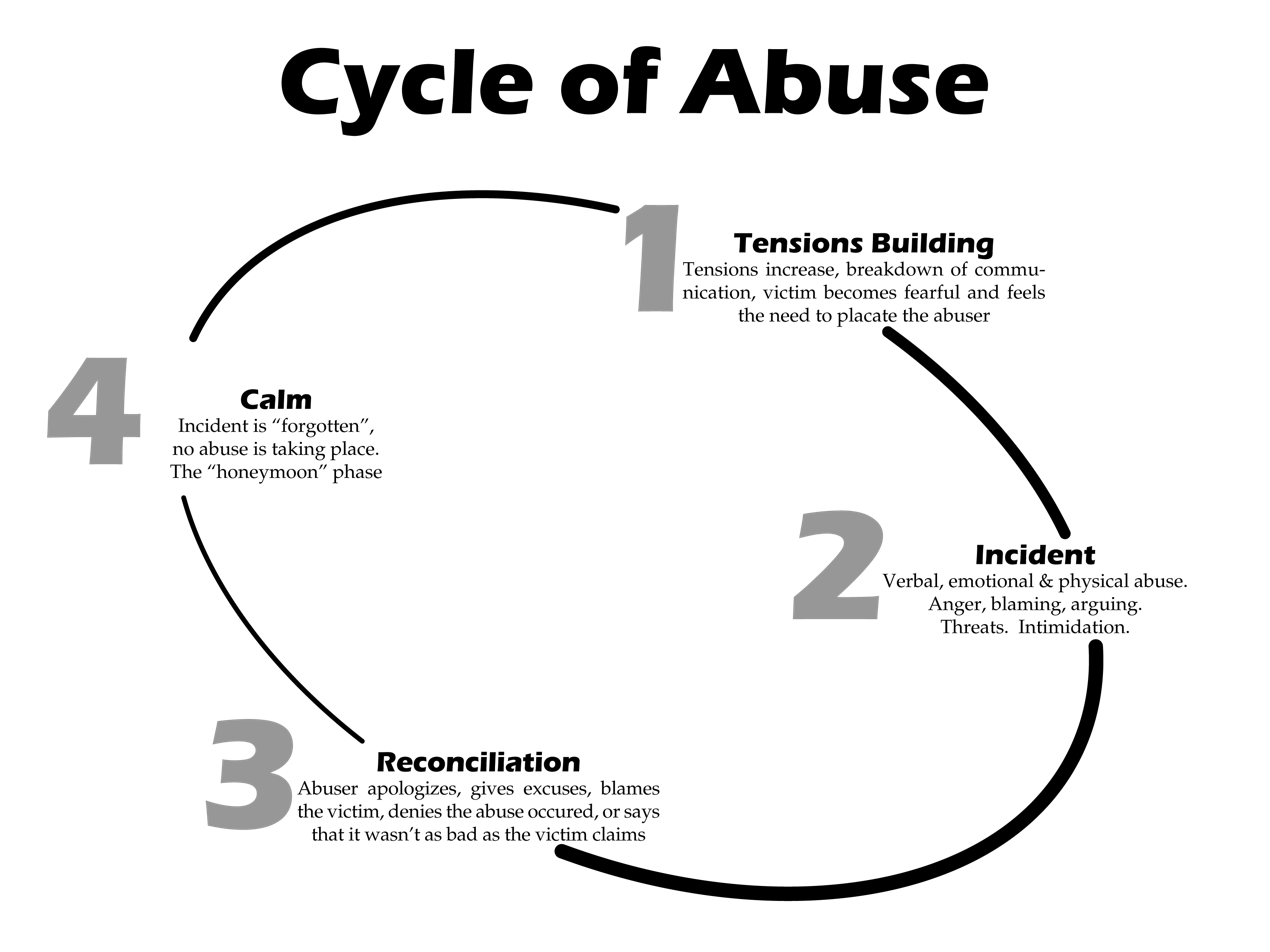
The four phases of the Cycle of Abuse.

Walker's work introduced the concept of Battered Woman Syndrome (BWS), a subset of post-traumatic stress disorder (PTSD), which gained recognition as a legal defense in some cases involving women who killed their abusers in self-defense, and the Cycle of Abuse model.

The Cycle of Abuse is a theoretical framework that identifies patterns in abusive relationships. It consists of four phases: tension-building, incident, reconciliation, and calm (later termed the "honeymoon phase"). In the tension-building phase, stress and conflict gradually escalate, leading to an explosive incident of abuse. Afterward, reconciliation occurs, where the abuser may apologize or attempt to minimize their actions, often coupled with affection or promises of change. This is followed by the calm phase, a period of relative peace that reinforces hope for improvement. However, the cycle typically repeats, creating a psychological trap for the victim. Walker's model highlighted the cyclical nature of abuse, explaining why victims often find it difficult to leave abusive relationships.

Walker's contributions extend beyond theory; she has worked as an advocate, educator, and clinician, striving to improve legal, social, and therapeutic responses to IPV. Her research has influenced laws and policies worldwide, including training for law enforcement and mental health professionals. Walker continues to be celebrated for her relentless efforts to raise awareness about domestic violence and empower survivors.

=== Murder trial of O. J. Simpson ===
Frequency tree of 100 000 battered American women showing the prosecutor's fallacy in OJ Simpson's murder trial, by CMG Le

In 1995, Walker offered to testify for O. J. Simpson during his trial for the murders of his ex-wife, Nicole Brown Simpson, and her friend, Ron Goldman. Since evidence of Simpson physically abusing Brown in the past had already been shown by the prosecution, to the point that he had once been arrested and pleaded no contest for spousal abuse, Walker's colleagues accused her of betraying her advocacy for financial gain. The National Coalition Against Domestic Violence wrote of Walker's assessment of Simpson, "[it] is absolutely the opposite of the assessment of most battered women's advocates in this country." During the subsequent civil trial, Walker testified against him instead and testified for the Goldmans.

=== Contemporary tenures ===
For a time, Walker lived and worked in Denver, Colorado, where she was a licensed psychologist and led in the area of study of domestic violence, serving as the president and chief executive officer of Walker & Associates.

Walker has conducted research on family violence and founded the Domestic Violence Institute. She has also testified as an expert witness in trials involving domestic abuse and had developed domestic violence training programs and drafted legislative reform. During her work, Walker interviewed 1,500 women who had been subject to domestic violence and found that there was a similar pattern of abuse, a cycle of abuse.

In 2016, Walker was awarded Professor of the Year at Nova Southeastern University. She is Professor Emeritus at Nova Southeastern University's College of Psychology.

== Honors and awards ==
- APF Gold Medal Award for Impact in Psychology, 2023
- Professor of the Year Award, 2016
- IVAT Lifetime Advocacy Award, 2013
- APA Presidential Citation, 2002
- APA Division 43 Family Psychologist of the Year, 2001
- APA Presidential Citation, 2000
- APA and National Women's Health Award, 1994
- Colorado Women's Hall of Fame, 1987
- Distinguished Media Award, 1979

== Books ==
- Women Who Kill: Violence, Trauma, and Forensic Psychology (2024)
- Madness to Murder (2021)
- Forensic Practice for the Mental Health Clinician (2019)
- Handbook on Sex Trafficking (2018)
- The Battered Woman Syndrome (2009)
- First Responder's Guide to Abnormal Psychology (2007)
- Abused Women And Survivor Therapy (1994)
- Terrifying Love: Why Battered Women Kill And How Society Responds (1989)
- The Battered Woman (1979)
