= Women's Center & Shelter of Greater Pittsburgh =

Aid organization for victims of domestic violence

- Abbreviation: WC&S Pittsburgh
- Formation: 1974
- Founder: Ellen Berliner and Anne Steytler
- Founded at: Pittsburgh, Pennsylvania, United States
- Type: Nonprofit organization
- Purpose: To create a community of safety, healing, and empowerment for children and adults affected by domestic violence
- Headquarters: Pittsburgh, Pennsylvania, United States
- Region served: Greater Pittsburgh area
- Website: www.wcspittsburgh.org
- Remarks: WC&S Pittsburgh is one of the first six domestic violence response and prevention centers established in the United States

The Women's Center & Shelter of Greater Pittsburgh was founded in 1974 in Pittsburgh, Pennsylvania, and provides services for victims of domestic violence. It was one of the first six centers for domestic violence that was established in the United States.

The Women's Center works in conjunction with Allegheny County, the City of Pittsburgh, and surrounding municipalities to provide support for victims of domestic abuse.

Nicole Molinaro has been the president and chief executive officer of the organization since 2018.

== History ==
Founded in 1974 by Ellen Berliner and Anne Steytler, the Women's Center & Shelter was one of the first six centers for domestic violence response and prevention to be established in the United States. Many of its board members and other volunteers over the years have been prominent members of the Pittsburgh community, including television news anchor Sally Wiggin and philanthropist Rachel Mellon Walton.

Originally situated in a small storefront in the Pittsburgh area, Berliner and Steytler founded the center to be a safe environment for women to meet after discovering the staggering prevalence of domestic violence committed against women in the United States.

Today, the Women's Center & Shelter is a resource for around 7,200 individuals per year; seeking refuge from domestic violence. The organization has resources available for women, men, gender non-conforming individuals, and children who have suffered abuse and is also positioned to provide a safe haven for individuals to heal from their trauma. The center is a resource for providing step-by-step legal guidance, dispute resolution, counseling, child-care, and child violence alternative programs.

Center staff and volunteers have also worked to educate civic and business leaders, healthcare providers, journalists, law enforcement officers, attorneys and judicial system personnel, teachers and school administrators, and members of the general public about the cycle of domestic violence and ways to safely interrupt or prevent that cycle. In 1993, "beatings [were] the leading cause of injury for women 15 to 44, and the second worst for women of all ages," according to United States Surgeon General Antonia Novello." That year, beatings caused more injuries to women than cancer and car accidents combined.

According to the National Domestic Violence Hotline, roughly four out of every five victims of intimate partner violence between 1994 and 2010 were female. "'We see as many upper-middle-class professional women as we see lower-income women,'" said Janet Scott, who was the community education and training director for the Women's Center & Shelter of Greater Pittsburgh during the early 1990s.

In 1994, Sylvia Choi, M.D. became a center volunteer. While still performing her medical residency, she developed and implemented a medical outreach initiative, which she subsequently expanded into a program that provided routine medical examinations and immunizations for the children of domestic violence victims.

In 1995, the Women's Center & Shelter of Greater Pittsburgh received a $250,000 grant from the Vera I. Heinz Endowment to create a violence prevention curriculum for early-grade elementary school students. That same year, it also received $49,188 from Pittsburgh's Federal Home Loan Bank toward the $731,659 estimated cost of rehabilitating twelve rental units that would be used to provide housing for domestic violence victims and their children.

In 1999, the center partnered with Blue Cross Blue Shield on a public service advertising campaign, "Some women need to know their place...this is it" to raise awareness among women about the domestic violence prevention and response services available to them. That same year, the center also began its partnership with Bell Atlantic Mobile to distribute cell phones to women at risk of harm from abusers. Each of the phones were pre-programmed to quickly reach an emergency service line by pressing one button that dialed 911.

== Programs and services ==
The Women's Center & Shelter has several departments and outreach programs that provide victims of domestic violence with free and confidential support. The organization provides a holistic-minded approach of healing; through supporting and empowering victims of domestic abuse.

Programs and resources provided through the Women's Center & Shelter include:

- 24-Hour Hotline
- Emergency Shelter
- Legal Advocacy
- Medical Advocacy
- Individual and Group Support Sessions
- Children's Counseling Center
- LGBTQIA+ Advocacy
