= Love bombing =

Attempt to influence others through displays of affection

While used for positive and negative purposes, love bombing is identified as a possible part of a cycle of abuse.

Love bombing is an attempt to influence a person by demonstrations of attention and affection. Psychologists have identified love bombing as a possible part of a cycle of abuse and have warned against it. Its use by cults has also been described as psychological manipulation to create a feeling of unity within a group against a society perceived as hostile. The technique is also often used by romance scammers and others with nefarious intentions who seek to manipulate a victim and create a feeling of trust and connection.

== Definition and analysis ==
The expression "love bombing" was coined by members of the Unification Church of the United States during the 1970s, and was also used by members of the Family International (previously known as Children of God). Psychology professor Margaret Singer reported on the concept. In her 1996 book Cults in Our Midst, she writes:

As soon as any interest is shown by the recruits, they may be love bombed by the recruiter or other cult members. This process of feigning friendship and interest in the recruit was originally associated with one of the early youth cults, but soon it was taken up by a number of groups as part of their program for luring people in. Love bombing is a coordinated effort, usually under the direction of leadership, that involves long-term members' flooding recruits and newer members with flattery, verbal seduction, affectionate but usually nonsexual touching, and lots of attention to their every remark. Love bombing—or the offer of instant companionship—is a deceptive ploy accounting for many successful recruitment drives.

== Abusive relationships ==
Modern social media can intensify the effect of love bombing since it gives the abuser nearly constant contact and communication with the victim. One of the signs of love bombing in the start of a relationship is intense attention during a short period of time and pressure for very rapid commitment. Psychiatrist Dale Archer identifies the phases of love bombing with the acronym IDD: "Intense Idealization, Devaluation, Discard (Repeat)", and the process of identifying this behavior pattern as SLL: "Stop, Look, and Listen", after which breaking off contact with the abuser can become more possible by also seeking support from family and friends.

Another sign of love bombing is being intensely showered with affection, gifts, and promises for the future with the predator so that the victim feels or is made to believe that all this is a sign of "love at first sight". Since such signs of affection and affirmation may meet felt needs and not look harmful at the surface, the excitement of such a new relationship often does not appear as cause for alarm. However, after the initial excitement, when the victim shows interest or care about anything beyond their new partner, the manipulator may show anger or passive-aggressive behavior, or accuse the victims of selfishness. If the victim does not comply with demands, the devaluation stage begins: the abuser withdraws all affection or positive reinforcement and instead punishes the victim with whatever they feel is appropriate—shouting, beratement, mind games, silent treatment, or even physical abuse. The expression has been used to describe the tactics used by pimps and gang members to control their victims.

== Benign occurrences ==
Excessive attention and affection does not constitute love bombing if there is no intent or pattern of further abuse. Archer explains:

The key to understanding how love bombing differs from romantic courtship is to look at what happens next, after two people are officially a couple. If extravagant displays of affection continue indefinitely, if actions match words, and there is no devaluation phase, then it's probably not love bombing. That much attention might get annoying after a while, but it's not unhealthy in and of itself.

British author and psychologist Oliver James recommended love bombing as a technique for parents to help their troubled children. He described it as "dedicating one-on-one time spoiling and lavishing your child with love, and, within reason, pandering to their every wish." In 2011 Heidi Scrimgeour, a reporter for The Daily Express, tried the technique with her son and reported:

It's not rocket science that showering a child with affection will impact positively on their behaviour but what surprised me was how much my behaviour changed. Love bombing enabled me to see my child through a fresh lens, my disposition towards him softened and he seemed to bask in the glow of positive attention.

== See also ==
- Brainwashing
- Emotional blackmail
- Honey trapping
- Love jihad
- Narcissism
- Sexual grooming
- Situationship
- Sycophancy
- Superficial charm
