= Rape in the United States =

Sexual violence in the United States

Rape is defined by the United States Department of Justice as "Penetration, no matter how slight, of the vagina or anus with any body part or object, or oral penetration by a sex organ of another person, without the consent of the victim." While definitions and terminology of rape vary by jurisdiction in the United States, the FBI revised its definition in 2013 to eliminate a requirement that the crime involve an element of force.

A 2013 study concluded that rape was grossly underreported in the United States. Another 2014 study found that police departments may remove or undercount rapes from official records in part to "create the illusion of success in fighting violent crime".

According to the 2013 National Crime Victimization Survey, the annual prevalence rate for all sexual assaults including rape was 0.1% (annual prevalence rate represents the number of victims each year, rather than the number of assaults since some are victimized more than once during the reporting period). The survey included males and females aged 12+. Since rapes are a subset of all sexual assaults, the prevalence of rape is lower than the combined statistic. Of those assaults, the Bureau of Justice Statistics stated that 34.8% were reported to the police, up from 29.3% in 2004.

== Definitions ==
In the United States, at the Federal level, the FBI's Uniform Crime Report (UCR) definitions are used when collating national crime statistics from states across the US. The UCR's definition of rape was changed on 1 January 2013 to remove the requirement of force against a female and to include a wider range of types of penetration. The new definition reads:

Penetration, no matter how slight, of the vagina or anus with any body part or object, or oral penetration by a sex organ of another person, without the consent of the victim.

For 80 years prior to the 2013 change, the UCR's definition of rape was "carnal knowledge of a female forcibly and against her will".

At the state level, there is no uniform legal definition of rape; instead, each state has their own laws. These definitions can vary considerably. Many U.S. states replaced the traditional legal term rape during widespread reforms in the 1970s and 1980s, instead using sexual assault, criminal sexual conduct, sexual abuse, sexual battery, etc.

One legal definition, which is used by the United States Armed Forces is found in the United States Uniform Code of Military Justice [Title 10, Subtitle A, Chapter 47X, Section 920, Article 120], defines rape as:

(a) Rape. — Any person subject to this chapter who commits a sexual act upon another person by —

(1) using unlawful force against that other person;

(2) using force causing or likely to cause death or grievous bodily harm to any person;

(3) threatening or placing that other person in fear that any person will be subjected to death, grievous bodily harm, or kidnapping;

(4) first rendering that other person unconscious; or

(5) administering to that other person by force or threat of force, or without the knowledge or consent of that person, a drug, intoxicant, or other similar substance and thereby substantially impairing the ability of that other person to appraise or control conduct;

is guilty of rape and shall be punished as a court-martial may direct.

== Statistics and data ==
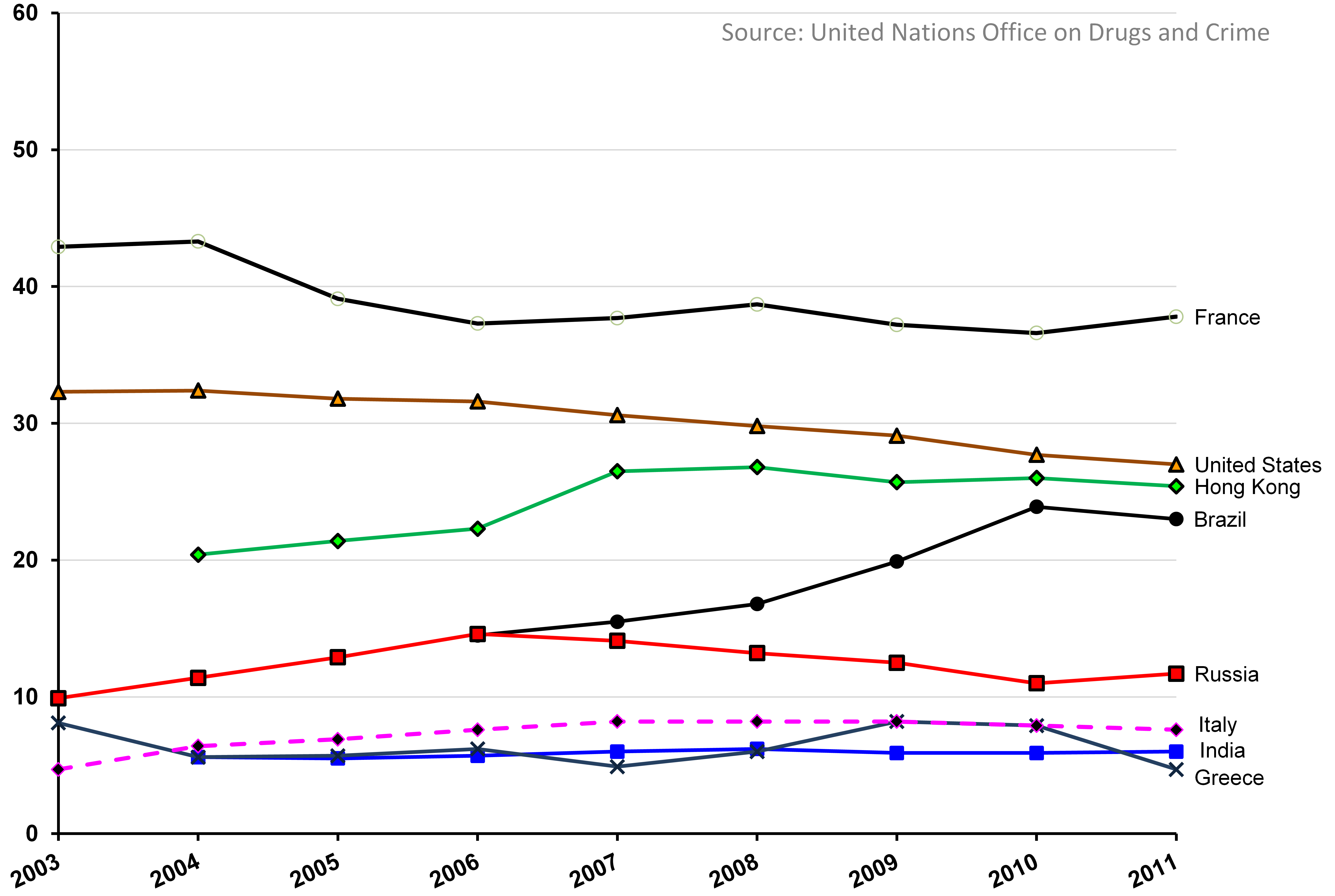
Annual rape and all forms of sexual assaults per 100,000 people, in various countries, 2003–2011

=== Prevalence and number of incidents ===
The National Violence Against Women Survey (NVAWS) stated that 300,000 women and 93,000 men were raped annually between November 1995 to May 1996. Rape prevalence among women in the U.S. (the percentage of women who experienced rape at least once in their lifetime so far) is in the range of 15–20% according to different studies (National Violence Against Women Survey, 1995, found 17.6% prevalence rate; a 2007 national study for the Department of Justice on rape found 18% prevalence rate.). According to a March 2013 report from the U.S. Department of Justice's Bureau of Justice Statistics, from 1995 to 2010, the estimated annual rate of female rape or sexual assault declined 58%, from 5.0 victimizations per 1,000 females age 12 or older to 2.1 per 1,000. Assaults on young women aged 12–17 declined from 11.3 per 1,000 in 1994–1998 to 4.1 per 1,000 in 2005–2010; assaults on women aged 18–34 also declined over the same period, from 7.0 per 1,000 to 3.7.

The 2018 Uniform Crime Report (UCR), which measures rapes that are reported to police, estimated that there were 139,380 rapes reported to law enforcement in 2018. The 2016 National Crime Victimization Survey (NCVS), which measures sexual assaults and rapes that may not have been reported to the police, estimated that there were 431,840 incidents of rape or sexual assault in 2015.

Other government surveys, such as the Sexual Victimization of College Women study, critique the NCVS on the basis it includes only those acts perceived as crimes by the victim, and report a much higher victimization rate. Estimates from other sources typically report much higher levels of both rape and sexual assault than either the NCVS or UCR. A 2010 study conducted by the Centers for Disease Control found that around 1 in 5 women and 1 in 71 men (an additional 1 in 21 men were 'made to penetrate' someone else) had experienced an attempted or completed rape in their lifetime. Differences in survey samples, definitions of rape and sexual assault, and the wording of survey questions likely contribute to these differences, and there is no consensus on the best way to measure rape and sexual assault. Both the NCVS and UCR are believed to significantly under-count the number of rapes and sexual assaults that occur.

Based on the available data, 21.8% of American rapes of female victims are gang rapes. RAINN, an American nonprofit anti-sexual assault organization, the largest in the United States, reported: every 68 seconds, an American is sexually assaulted.

According to the 2016/2017 National Intimate Partner and Sexual Violence Survey, 1 in 4 women and 1 in 26 men in the United States have experienced rape in their lifetime. Additionally, 1 in 9 men in the United States report being forced to penetrate someone during their lifetime.

A United States Department of Justice report, Sexual Victimization in Prisons and Jails Reported by Inmates, states that "In 2011–12, an estimated 4.0% of state and federal prison inmates and 3.2% of jail inmates reported experiencing one or more incidents of sexual victimization by another inmate or facility staff in the past 12 months or since admission to the facility, if less than 12 months." However, advocates dispute the accuracy of the numbers, saying they under-report the real numbers of sexual assaults in prison, especially among juveniles.

=== Shift in the form of crime ===
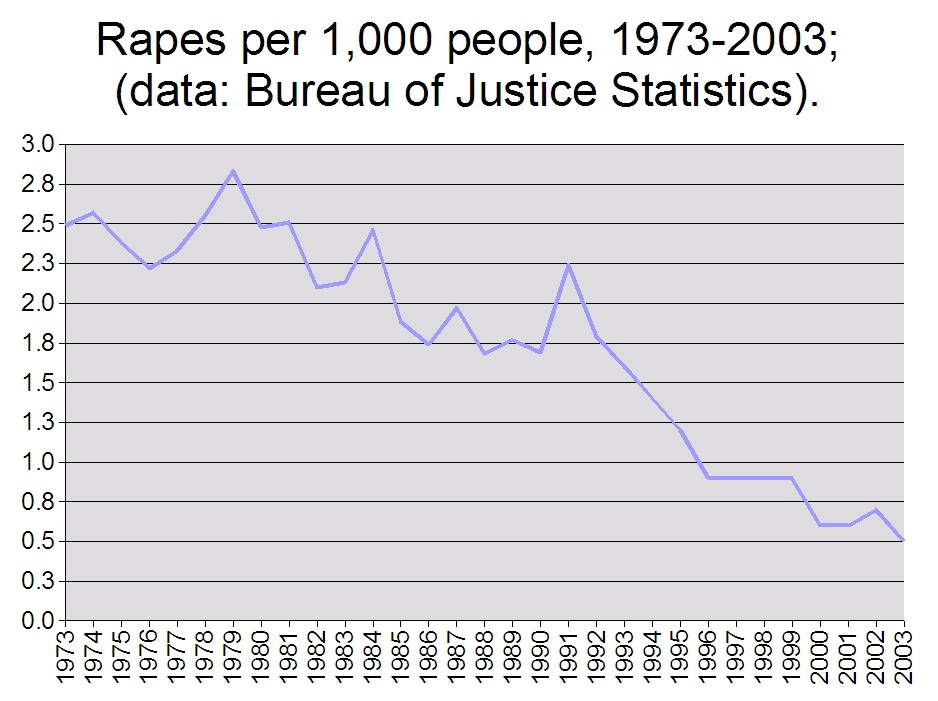

Over the last four decades, rape has been declining. According to the National Crime Victimization Survey, the adjusted annual per-capita victimization rate of rape has declined from about 2.4 per 1000 people (age 12 and above) in 1980 (that is, 2.4 persons from each 1000 people 12 and older were raped in 1980) to about 0.4 per 1000 people in 2003, a decline of about 85%. There are several possible explanations for this, including stricter laws and education on security for women.

=== Demographics of attackers and victims ===
The Federal Bureau of Investigation have also collected data cases involving victims and perpetrators of sex offenses:

Sex offense offenders and victims statistics (Data: FBI)
Year	Offenders			Victims		
Year	Male	Female	Unknown	Male	Female	Unknown
2012	65,071 (Forcible); 5,859 (Nonforcible)	3,853 (Forcible); 541 (Nonforcible)	1,517 (Forcible); 86 (Nonforcible)	11,471 (Forcible); 629 (Nonforcible)	61,486 (Forcible); 5,859 (Nonforcible)	175 (Forcible); 5 (Nonforcible)
2013	62,280 (Forcible); 5,396 (Nonforcible)	3,846 (Forcible); 530 (Nonforcible)	1,486 (Forcible); 77 (Nonforcible)	10,961 (Forcible); 643 (Nonforcible)	58,981 (Forcible); 5,511 (Nonforcible)	202 (Forcible); 9 (Nonforcible)
2014	62,393 (Forcible); 4,804 (Nonforcible)	4,034 (Forcible); 498 (Nonforcible)	1,678 (Forcible); 51 (Nonforcible)	10,821 (Forcible); 590 (Nonforcible)	59,875 (Forcible); 4,888 (Nonforcible)	232 (Forcible); 6 (Nonforcible)
2015	66,545 (Forcible); 4,712 (Nonforcible)	4,391 (Forcible); 473 (Nonforcible)	2,069 (Forcible); 52 (Nonforcible)	11,463 (Forcible); 520 (Nonforcible)	64,202 (Forcible); 4,836 (Nonforcible)	225 (Forcible); 3 (Nonforcible)
2016	73,249 (Forcible); 4,588 (Nonforcible)	4,580 (Forcible); 516 (Nonforcible)	2,174 (Forcible); 74 (Nonforcible)	12,146 (Forcible); 637 (Nonforcible)	71,180 (Forcible); 4,723 (Nonforcible)	285 (Forcible); 6 (Nonforcible)
2017	79,635 (Forcible); 4,859 (Nonforcible)	4,887 (Forcible); 516 (Nonforcible)	2,448 (Forcible); 69 (Nonforcible)	12,632 (Forcible); 682 (Nonforcible)	78,308 (Forcible); 4,922 (Nonforcible)	268 (Forcible); 9 (Nonforcible)
2018	91,838	6,002	3,024	14,365	91,219	324
2019	105,030	6,920	3,230	16,263	104,720	348
2020	109,421	7,286	3,591	16,426	110,412	423
2021	149,724	9,922	3,547	21,803	154,726	514
2022	170,491	12,318	3,653	27,235	176,157	663
2023	176,999	12,921	4,919	30,063	182,919	610
2024	182,111	13,936	4,842	32,253	186,314	699

Rape offenders and victims (Data: FBI)
Year	Offenders			Victims		
Year	Male	Female	Unknown/Not Specified	Male	Female	Unknown/Not Specified
2020	74,168	3,593	2,313/5,294	8,316	72,442	103
2021	103,556	4,827	2,210/8,848	11,432	102,818	134
2022	107,656	5,331	2,186/10,528	12,516	107,783	127
2023	108,461	5,515	2,548/11,481	13,706	108,692	132
2024	108,877	5,888	2,686/11,678	14,532	108,592	157

Most rape research and reporting to date has concentrated on male-female forms of rape. Male-male and female-male rape has not been as thoroughly researched, and almost no research has been done on female-female rape.

A 1997 report by the U.S. Bureau of Justice Statistics found that 91% of rape victims are female and 9% are male, and that 99% of arrestees for rape are male. However, these statistics are based on reports of "forced penetration". This number excludes instances where men were "made to penetrate" another person, which are assessed separately under "sexual violence". Denov (2004) states that societal responses to the issue of female perpetrators of sexual assault "point to a widespread denial of women as potential sexual aggressors that could work to obscure the true dimensions of the problem."

A 2014 study by the Bureau of Justice Statistics of college campus rape statistics from National Crime Victimization Survey data collected from 1995 to 2013, and show that rape in college are independent of race. The National Violence Against Women Survey found that 34% of American Indian female respondents had experienced attempted or completed rape in their lifetime. The rapist was more likely to be a non-Native than a Native.

The 2010 National Intimate Partner and Sexual Violence Survey found that 13.1% of lesbians, 46.1% of bisexual women, and 17.4% of heterosexual women have been raped, physically assaulted, or stalked.

The 2016/2017 National Intimate Partner and Sexual Violence Survey found that for female victims of rape, 83.4% reported being raped at least one time before the age of 25, with 49.0% reporting they were first raped before the age of 18. For male rape victims, 86.1% reported being raped at least one time before the age of 25, with 56.6% reporting they were first raped before the age of 18. For male victims who were forced to penetrate someone, 79.9% reported being forced to penetrate at least one time before the age of 25, with 41.1% reporting they were forced to penetrate someone before the age of 18.

Women with disabilities in the United States experience significantly higher rates of gender-based violence compared to women without disabilities. According to the U.S. Centers for Disease Control and Prevention (CDC), more than one in four women in the country has a disability. Both women and men with disabilities face increased risks of sexual violence and intimate partner violence. Data from the National Intimate Partner and Sexual Violence Survey (NISVS) indicate that a substantial proportion of female rape victims had a disability at the time of the assault. Advocacy and public health reports highlight several structural factors that increase vulnerability. Many women with disabilities rely on caregivers or personal assistants for daily living tasks, which can create power imbalances and opportunities for abuse. Such abuse may include physical or sexual violence, neglect, withholding of mobility aids or medication, or coercive control over reproductive and sexual decisions.

Workplace violence disproportionately affects women with disabilities. A 2023 poll by The 19th News found that nearly half of women with disabilities reported experiencing sexual harassment or assault in the workplace—significantly higher than the rate reported by women without disabilities.

Researchers warn that the true prevalence of violence against women with disabilities is likely underestimated due to barriers in reporting, communication challenges, and social isolation. Limited access to shelters, legal services, and accessible reporting mechanisms further restricts many survivors from receiving support or justice.

==== Relationship between attacker and victim ====
An examination of the relationships between the victim and their attacker indicates the following:

Relationship of victim to rapist before the incident
Current or former intimate partner	26%
Another relative	7%
Friend or acquaintance	38%
Stranger	26%

About four out of ten sexual assaults take place at the victim's own home.

U.S. Senator Martha McSally, an Arizona Republican, said during a Senate meeting on sexual assault in the military that she was raped by a superior officer in the U.S. Air Force. McSally was the first female combat pilot in the U.S. Air Force. She said that she never reported it because so many people did not trust the system, she blamed herself, she was ashamed and confused, and she thought she was strong but was made to feel powerless.

The 2016/2017 National Intimate Partner and Sexual Violence Survey found that among women who have been raped, most have been raped by an acquaintance (56.1%), followed by intimate partners (39.3%), family members (16.0%), strangers (12.1%), brief encounters (9.6%), and persons of authority (4.0%). For men who have been raped, most were raped by acquaintances (57.3%), followed by family members (16.0%), strangers (13.7%), brief encounters (12.8%), intimate partners (12.5%), and persons of authority (9.2%). For men who have been forced to penetrate someone, most were forced to penetrate by acquaintanced (62.2%), followed by intimate partners (26.3%), brief encounters (14.3%), strangers (10.4%), family members (5.9%), and persons of authority (5.9%).

=== Underreporting ===
A 2014 report by the Department of Justice estimated that 34.8% of cases of sexual assaults are reported to the authorities.

When sufficient DNA or injury evidence was procured from a woman's body, she was more likely to follow through with the legal process of prosecution as there was more confidence in a favorable outcome for her. Women who experienced forced sexual assault more frequently were less likely to follow through with the legal process than women who do not experience forced sexual assault frequently.

Reasons victims reported sexual violence to law enforcement (2005-2010)
28%	Protect household or victim from further crimes by the offender
25%	Stop an ongoing incident or prevent immediate recurrence or escalation
21%	Felt a duty to report or to improve police surveillance
17%	Catch or punish offender, prevent crimes against others
9%	Other or multiple reasons

Reasons victims did not report sexual violence to law enforcement (2005-2010)
20%	Feared retaliation
13%	Believed the police would not do anything to help
13%	Believed it was a personal matter
8%	Reported to non-law-enforcement official
8%	Believed it was not important enough to report
7%	Did not want to get the perpetrator in trouble
2%	Believed the police could not do anything to help
30%	Other or multiple reasons

=== Prosecution rate ===
According to FBI statistics, out of 127,258 rapes reported to police departments in 2018, 33.4 percent resulted in an arrest. Based on correlating multiple data sources, RAINN (Rape, Abuse, and Incest National Network) estimates that for every 1,000 rapes, 384 are reported to police, 57 result in an arrest, 11 are referred for prosecution, 7 result in a felony conviction, and 6 result in incarceration. This compares to a higher rate at every stage for similar crimes.

== College and university campuses ==
Definitions of rape can vary, and since not all rapes are reported, researchers instead rely on surveys of student and nonstudent populations to develop a more comprehensive understanding of the prevalence. Survey design including the questions and the sample quality and scope can also create wide ranges in rates. Research estimates anywhere from approximately 10% to 29% of women have been victims of rape or attempted rape since starting college. Methodological differences, such as the method of survey administration, the definition of rape or sexual assault used, the wording of questions, and the time period studied contribute to these disparities.

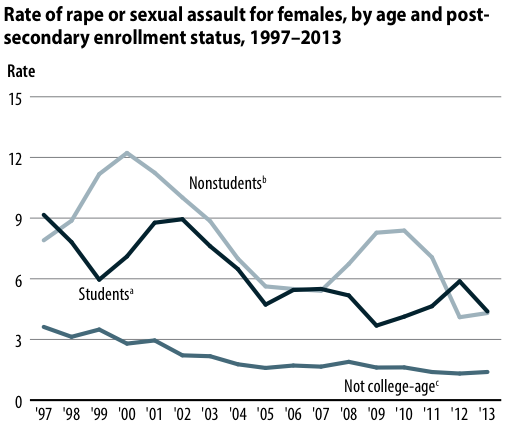
Rape, a subset of sexual assault, took place 3.1 times per 1,000 in females aged 18 to 24 in the year 2013.

One 2014 analysis, conducted by U.S. Department of Justice's Bureau of Justice Statistics, represents a longitudinal study of US women from 1995 to 2013. For the year 2013, the study found that there were more incidents of rape victimization among women aged 18–24 (4.3 per 1,000), compared to women outside that age range (1.4 per 1,000).

In an effort to prevent rape on campuses, the Obama administration instituted policies requiring schools to investigate rape cases and adjudicate rape cases under a "preponderance of the evidence" standard. These policies have been sharply criticized by civil libertarians concerned that they are eroding due process and will lead to wrongful convictions of the innocent. A number of lawsuits have been filed against colleges and universities by students claiming to have been wrongfully expelled for rape they did not commit. In 2016 the colleges with the highest rapes included Brown University and University of Connecticut tying for 43 rapes a year. Followed by Dartmouth College with 42, Wesleyan University with 35, University of Virginia with 35, Harvard with 33, University of North Carolina at Charlotte with 32, Rutgers in New Brunswick with 32, University of Vermont with 27 and ending with Stanford with 26 rapes per year.

Prevention programs vary across college campuses. Norms-based programs to inform students that they are not alone in knowledge of rape victims and perpetrators may encourage students to view sexual assault as a larger problem in their community. Additionally, creative campaigns on college campuses that market consent were found to be effective in raising awareness of campus sexual assaults and issues related to this problem.

=== Number of incidents ===
Rape or sexual assault victimization against females ages 18 to 24, by post-secondary enrollment status, 1995–2013
Categories	Student victim	Non-student victims
Total	31,302	65,668
Completed rape	10,237	26,369
Attempted rape	7,864	15,792
Sexual assault	9,714	18,260
Threat of rape or sexual assault	3,488	5,247

The mean annual population was 5,130,004 for students and 8,614,853 for non-students.

== Criminal punishment ==
Coercion-based law (all penetrative sex) Consent-based law (anal and oral sex) Consent-based law (vaginal, anal and oral sex) Mixed legislation; coerced sexual penetration treated as a separate, more severe crime

Coercion-based law (non-penetrative sex) Consent-based law (non-penetrative sex)

Green River College explanation of Washington state law on rape

The United States is composed principally of fifty states, each with its own criminal code, as well as the federal jurisdiction. Rape is prosecutable in all U.S. jurisdictions, as well as under the Uniform Code of Military Justice, although the terminology used varies by jurisdiction. Among the alternate names that may be used to prosecute a rape charge, the offense may be categorized as sexual assault, sexual battery, or criminal sexual conduct.

Some U.S. states (or other jurisdictions such as American Samoa) recognize penetrative sex without consent by the victim and without the use of force by the perpetrator as a crime (usually called 'rape'). Other states do not recognize this as a crime; their laws stipulate that the perpetrator must have used some kind of force or coercion (physical violence (that results in demonstrable physical injury), threats against the victim or a third party, or some other form of coercion) in order for such nonconsensual penetrative sex to amount to a crime.

Similarly, some states (or other jurisdictions such as the Military) recognize non-penetrative sex acts (contact such as fondling or touching a person's intimate parts, or exposure of a body or sexual activity) without consent by the victim and without the use of force by the perpetrator as a crime, while other states do not.

=== Jurisdiction ===
In the United States, the principle of dual sovereignty applies to rape, as to other crimes. If the rape is committed within the borders of a state, that state has jurisdiction. If the victim is a federal official, an ambassador, consul, or other foreign official under the protection of the United States, or if the crime took place on federal property or involved crossing state borders, or in a manner that substantially affects interstate commerce or national security, then the federal government also has jurisdiction.

If a crime is not committed within any state, such as in the District of Columbia or on a naval or U.S.-flagged merchant vessel in international waters, then federal jurisdiction is exclusive. In cases where the rape involves both state and federal jurisdictions, the offender can be tried and punished separately for each crime without raising issues of double jeopardy. When a state has jurisdiction over a rape case, as a matter of policy, federal prosecution will not be pursued for a rape charge unless the case presents a matter of federal interest, that interest was not adequately addressed by a state-level prosecution, and the government believes that a federal prosecution will be successful.

Jurisdiction issues also complicate the handling of campus rape, due in part to overlapping jurisdiction of campus and local law enforcement, and differences in how various police agencies and prosecutors handle sex offenses.

=== Federal law ===
Federal law does not use the term "rape". Rape is grouped with all forms of non-consensual sexual acts under chapter 109a of the United States Code (18 U.S.C. §§ 2241–2248).

Under federal law, the punishment for rape can range from a fine to life imprisonment. The severity of the punishment is based on the use of violence, the age of the victim, and whether drugs or intoxicants were used to override consent. If the perpetrator is a repeat offender the law prescribes automatically doubling the maximum sentence.

Whether the victim is an adult or of a child, the U.S. Supreme Court has held that the death penalty is not available as a possible penalty if the victim does not die and death was not intended by the defendant. Capital punishment remains available as a penalty where the victim dies, or where the defendant acts with intent to kill the victim but the victim survives.

Different categorizations and maximum punishments for rape under federal law
Description	Fine	Imprisonment (years)	Life imprisonment
Rape using violence or the threat of violence to override consent	unlimited	0 – unlimited	yes
Rape by causing fear in the victim for themselves or for another person to override consent	unlimited	0 – unlimited	yes
Rape by giving a drug or intoxicant to a person that renders them unable to give consent	unlimited	0–15	no
Statutory rape involving an adult perpetrator	unlimited	0–15	no
Statutory rape involving an adult perpetrator with a previous conviction	unlimited	0 – unlimited	yes
Statutory rape involving a perpetrator who is a minor	unlimited	0–15	no
When a person causes the rape by a third person	unlimited	0–10	no
When a person causes the rape of a child under 12 by a third person	unlimited	0 – unlimited	yes

== Investigations ==
Medical personnel in the United States of America typically collect evidence for potential rape cases commonly referred to as rape kits. Though normally collected, the rape kits are not always sent off for testing. Reasons given by the police for rape kits not being tested include cost (processing a kit can cost up to $1,500), decisions being made to not prosecute, and victims either recanting or declining to progress the case.

As identifying injury is an important part of identifying rape victims, particular attention must be given to examinations of patients with dark skin, particularly the thighs, labia majora, posterior fourchette, and fossa navicularis.

Newspaper Northern Virginia Sun drew national attention in the late 1970s when owner Herman J. Obermayer said the Sun would print the name of accusers in rape cases that came to trial, out of a sense of "fairness" between the two sides. Time magazine reported that Obermayer's policy was "hotly denounced by local feminists, police, prosecutors, hospital officials and nearly all the Sun readers who have written or telephoned Obermayer to comment." Time quoted Benjamin C. Bradlee, executive editor of the Washington Post, as saying, "It's wrong. It's misguided. We wouldn't do it."

It is important for lawyers selecting jury members to be aware of the stigmas surrounding rape victims and to be able to determine which jurors would be able to come to a guilty verdict according to the law, without being clouded by one's preconceived ideas of what a "typical" rape victim or perpetrator should look like.

== Treatment of rape victims ==
Insurance companies have denied coverage for rape victims, claiming a variety of bases for their actions. In one case, after a victim mentioned she had previously been raped 17 years before, an insurance company refused to pay for her rape exam and also refused to pay for therapy or medication for trauma, because she "had been raped before" – indicating a preexisting condition. Some insurance companies have allegedly denied sexual-assault victims mental-health treatment, stating that the service is not medically necessary.

The 2005 Violence Against Women Act requires states to ensure that victims receive access to a forensic examination free of charge regardless of whether the victim chooses to report a sexual assault to law enforcement or cooperate with the criminal justice system. All states must comply with the VAWA 2005 requirement regarding forensic examination in order to receive STOP Violence Against Women Formula Grant Program (STOP Program) funds. Under 42 U.S.C. § 3796gg-4, a State is not entitled to funds under the STOP Program unless the State or another governmental entity "incurs the full out-of-pocket cost of forensic medical exams ... for victims of sexual assault." This means that, if no other governmental entity or insurance carrier pays for the exam, states are required to pay for forensic exams if they wish to receive STOP Program funds. The goal of this provision is to ensure that the victim is not required to pay for the exam. The effect of the VAWA 2005 forensic examination requirement is to allow victims time to decide whether to pursue their case. Because a sexual assault is a traumatic event, some victims are unable to decide whether they want to cooperate with law enforcement in the immediate aftermath of a sexual assault. Because forensic evidence can be lost as time progresses, such victims should be encouraged to have the evidence collected as soon as possible without deciding to initiate a report. This provision ensures victims receive timely medical treatment.

Due to bureaucratic mismanagement in some areas, and various loopholes, the victim is sometimes sent a bill anyway, and has difficulty in getting it fixed.

== Historical context ==
=== Early American history ===
Rape and its prosecution have been present in America as early as its initial conception. Such is the case of Henry Bedlow and the raping of Lanah Sawyer in 1793 in the New York court. The evening started for Sawyer with socialization amongst friends, walks in the city, and evening going out for ice cream, but ended with Bedlow taking her to a brothel, and according to Sawyer, raping her. Bedlow was prosecuted for rape, a capital crime at the time. He was acquitted by an all-male jury. Lanah's social indulgence with the man led the jurors to believe she had consented. Rape in this era was pictured to take place in a dark alley, a random stranger attacking a woman. But in reality, the accused rape was often between women and men who knew each other. Private affairs, those between people who knew each other, did not require the same community intervention and surveillance that was demanded by more public attacks. Rapes that were reported and taken to trial did not result in a prosecution due to the fact it was different to the social understanding of what a rape could be, and consent by the woman purely based on social interaction was always assumed. Along with the misconception of strangers attacking women under cover of shadow and wielding a knife, black men, enslaved and free were often accused. Due to the social differences between white communities and black communities, black men were seen as more likely to commit the act of rape. This thought of violence was also perpetuated by the fact black men were outcasts in white societies and did not have the social means to coerce white women. Coercion was seen in white communities' as it is today, among people who are within each other's social circles.

During the era of slavery, enslaved women were frequently sexually abused and raped by slave owners, the sons of slave owners, and overseers. The sexual abuse of the enslaved that occurred prior to the Civil War was so prevalent that it strongly influenced the genetic make-up of the overwhelming majority of African Americans alive today. White men who raped black women were protected by impunity under Southern society, and children of such unions usually inherited the status of their mothers as enslaved peoples. Sexual assaults affected girls as young as 12 years old; a young enslaved girl named Celia was the frequent target of her master, Robert Newsom's abuse. After having three children with him in a relationship that began when she was only 14, Celia killed her master in self-defense after another attempt at sexual assault. She was found guilty in court and sentenced to death by hanging. Enslaved women were also subject to sexual abuse by slave traders and were routinely assaulted on slave ships; the perpetrators faced no legal punishment. The rape of enslaved women was also done by masters to result in a substantial growth of their enslaved people as property and increase profit. Slave owners would attempt to justify the abuse of black women during slavery through the stereotype of the Jezebel, a seductive woman who wanted to submit to them. According to authors Judith Worell and Pamela Remer, because "African American women were sexually exploited during slavery" and because of stereotypes originating from slavery such as the Jezebel, black women "are not viewed as credible complainants, and are stereotyped (e.g., as promiscuous) in ways that blame them for their rapes."

Before and during the American Civil War when slavery was widespread, laws against rape were focused primarily on instances of black men raping white women, real or imagined, as opposed to other instances. Black women who were raped by any man were not protected by the law. In some states during the 1950s, a white woman having consensual sex with and a black man was considered rape. and is related to lynchings, racial violence, rapes targeting African-Americans (Such as the Tulsa race massacre) that occurred under the suspicion of rape or consensual sex between a black man and white woman.

Native American women were also raped by white men during European colonization.

Sexual violence directed at and scapegoated upon Black men also constitutes a significant element of rape culture in the United States. Its roots can be traced back to slavery, which employed sexual violence and other forms of power-based violence as mechanisms to uphold a racial hierarchy founded on white supremacy. Numerous scholars have examined the representation of the African American male body during this era and have concluded that it contributed to the hypersexualization of Black masculinity. Enslaved black males were frequently depicted as partially clothed in popular cultural representations. This depiction, along with the systemic objectification of enslaved people, fostered a culture that fixated on Black bodies and facilitated sexual violence against them. For enslaved Black men, this manifested in various forms of sexual violence, including forced coupling and the sexual assault of female slaves aimed at producing more slaves, sexual assault as a form of punishment, and sexual violence inflicted by white women on plantations. Sexual violence and rape is deeply embedded in the foundation of the United States, and its intersection with race is equally significant. When Christopher Columbus colonized what is now the United States in 1492, sexual violence served as a crucial means of control used to dominate Native American women. Columbus and his white associates not only committed acts of sexual violence against Indigenous women and gender-diverse individuals but also trafficked them to others for the purpose of rape, establishing a system of sex trafficking. Many of the Indigenous survivors of this violence were as young as nine to ten years old.

=== Civil Rights Movement ===
During the Jim Crow era that led into the Civil Rights Movement, sexual violence against African American women were tied to unequal justice and discrimination. During the time, these issues were often times unaddressed by the legal system. Juries refused to charge white men, law enforcement ignored the cases, and Black women were often denied legal protection. African Americans were experiencing extreme racial violence and injustice long before the Civil Rights Movement. As early as 1922 The Black Dispatch] Newspaper was reporting on rape cases and weaknesses in the legal system, and demanding justice.

In At the End of the Dark Street, historian, Danielle L. McGuire, aruged that resistance to sexual violence against African American women prompted community organzing and helped shape early civil rights activism. Black communities organized campaigns, formed advocacy groups, and mobilized grassroots efforts to demand justice. The violence these women experienced were tools of control and terrorization used by white men. Black women and communities actively resisted, but their efforts were not always successful. For example, in the case of Recy Taylor, a Black woman who was abducted and raped by six white men, she and many other community members, including Rosa Parks, fought for the men to get arrested and jailed, but none of the men were ever convicted of the crime.

While earlier histories focused on voting rights, protests, and laws, contemporary historians have also examined the role that sexual violence played in the Civil Rights Movement. Jane Dailey's review of At the Dark End of the Street examined how sexual violence was central to activism in the movement, and how Black women's experiences were often overlooked.

=== Contemporary history ===
Prior to the 1970s, in many US states a rape conviction could be punishable by death. The 1977 Supreme Court case of Coker v. Georgia held that the Eighth Amendment to the United States Constitution forbade the death penalty for the crime of rape of an adult woman. The court held that "Life is over for the victim of the murderer; for the rape victim, life may not be nearly so happy as it was, but it is not over, and normally is not beyond repair". Peggy Reeves Sanday, a professor at University of Pennsylvania, described the US as probably being "in all likelihood one of the most rape-prone societies in the world."

Feminism politicized and publicized rape as an institution in the late 20th century.

New York Radical Feminists held a Rape Speak Out, where women discussed rape as an expression of male violence against women, and organized women to establish rape crisis centers and work towards reforming existing rape laws. This was the first attempt to focus political attention on the issue of rape.

Feminist writings on rape include Against Our Will: Men, Women, and Rape, by Susan Brownmiller. Concepts such as date rape and marital rape were brought to public attention.

The murder of Megan Kanka, which occurred in 1994 in New Jersey, when the seven-year-old girl was raped and murdered by her neighbor, has led to the introduction of Megan's Law, which are laws which require law enforcement to disclose details relating to the location of registered sex offenders.

Several developments in regard to rape legislation have occurred in the 21st century. Following the intensely publicized case of the 2005 murder of Jessica Lunsford, a nine-year-old girl from Florida who was kidnapped, raped and murdered by a man with prior convictions for sexual attacks, states have started enacting laws referred to as Jessica's Law, which typically mandate life imprisonment with a mandatory minimum sentence of 25 years in prison, and lifetime electronic monitoring, for adults convicted of raping children under 12 years. Furthermore, US sex offender registries contain other sanctions, such as housing and presence restrictions.

== See also ==
- Combined DNA Index System
- Debbie Smith Act
- Extremities, a play (and later film with Farrah Fawcett) in which a would-be rape victim and her roommates, given the complexities of the judicial system, debate reporting the attack
- Marital rape in the United States
- National Clearinghouse on Marital and Date Rape (defunct)
- Paul Martin Andrews, an American rape victim and an advocate for other rape victims.
- Prison rape in the United States
- Rape, Abuse & Incest National Network (RAINN)
- Rape law in Alabama
- Rape laws in the United States
- Sexual assault in the U.S. military
- Tailhook scandal
- 2003 United States Air Force Academy sexual assault scandal
- Vanderbilt rape case
