= Lanah Sawyer =

Lanah Sawyer was born in New York City about 1776. In 1793, when she was seventeen and working as a seamstress, she charged the twenty-six-year-old gentleman Henry Bedlow (1767-1838) with rape. A grand jury indicted Bedlow and he was tried for rape, then a capital crime. After a trial of some fifteen hours, according to the published account of the trial, the all-male jury acquitted him after deliberating for fifteen minutes. Protests following the trial incited debate about upper-class privilege and gender bias in the American court system. The trial is cited by many authors as evidence of the sexual double standard that existed in Revolutionary America. After a subsequent civil trial, Bedlaw had to pay substantial damages to Sawyer's family.

== Rape and trial ==
Lanah Sawyer, who was from a family of modest circumstances, reported that while on a walk in Lower Manhattan with Harry Bedlow, a gentleman from a wealthy family (who had given her a false name to obscure his bad reputation), forced her into a brothel and, despite her protests and struggles, tore off her clothes and raped her. Sawyer reported the assault; Bedlow was indicted, tried, and, after a dramatic trial in which he was represented by no less than six attorneys, acquitted. Bedlow's lawyers argued, among other things, that Sawyer's agreement to go for a walk with Bedlow was implied consent. This belief stemmed from a change in the perception of female sexuality, which had developed over the course of the 18th century. Gone was the Puritan perception of women as reserved, non-sexual beings. In its place surfaced a stereotype of a female temptress, developed from the abundance of literature, both poems and novels, published during the 18th century, which featured female characters actively pursuing men with a permissive attitude towards sex. This new perception of women spawned a new attitude towards rape as well. In the 17th century women who made claims of rape were more often than not automatically believed since it was thought that a woman would not be so bold as to falsely accuse a man or dare to actively pursue sexual activity on her own, therefore she must have been raped. By the late 18th century however, this new perception of women as sexually uncontrollable made the claim of rape less believable, making trials like Lanah Sawyer's, in which rapists got off uncharged, much more common.

This dismissal of female claims was made worse by the fact that women were also not considered full citizens at the time of Sawyer's rape. In her trial, Sawyer's female neighbor testified in defense of Sawyer's character, corroborating the opinion that Sawyer would not willingly go to bed with a man prior to marriage, however the neighbor's testament was ignored due to the fact that she was a woman too, and could therefore not be trusted to have a sound legal opinion. It was argued that putting the life of a citizen in the hands of a woman was not proper, a statement that resonated with the male jury, allowing ultimately for Bedlow's acquittal.

== Significance and aftermath ==
Bedlow's acquittal sparked a series of protests including riots that destroyed the brothel in which the rape occurred and a number of other bawdy houses run by women. Outrage at the trial stemmed in part from sympathy with Lanah Sawyer, but also from class resentments among the city’s working men who felt disparaged by the elitist arguments of Bedlow’s lawyers during the trial. The city’s leaders disparaged the rioters as low-class white men, apprentices, boys, and “Negroes."

There was also a vigorous newspaper debate about the trial and the subsequent riots—including an anonymous letter written to one of the city's newspapers under the pseudonym "Justitia", which featured a searing criticism of the outcome of the trial, as well as condemnation of the entire institution of brothels and their male patrons. The points brought up in the letter were thoroughly ignored by the public however, which attacked the author of the letter with questions of her own moral character and honor.

Sawyer's stepfather subsequently sued Bedlow in civil court for "seduction". A jury awarded Sawyer's family $4,500 in damages, a huge amount that forced Bedlow into debtor's prison.

History professor John Wood Sweet wrote a 2022 book about the case, The Sewing Girl's Tale: A Story of Crime and Consequences in Revolutionary America.
