= Rape, Abuse & Incest National Network =

American nonprofit organization

Rape, Abuse & Incest National Network (RAINN)
- Abbreviation: RAINN
- Founded: June 8, 1994; 32 years ago
- Founder: Scott Berkowitz
- Type: 501(c)(3)
- Tax ID no.: 52-1886511
- Legal status: Nonprofit organization
- Purpose: To help survivors and their loved ones and run programs to prevent rape and hold perpetrators accountable.
- Location: Washington, D.C., United States
- Region served: United States
- President: Scott Berkowitz
- Chair: Reagan Burke
- Treasurer: Katharine Miller
- Secretary: Traci Sefi
- Key people: Regan Burke, Christina Ricci, Tori Amos
- Revenue: $15,833,865 (2020)
- Expenses: $11,618,798 (2020)
- Employees: 258 (2019)
- Volunteers: 4,000 (2019)
- Website: www.rainn.org

The Rape, Abuse & Incest National Network (RAINN) is an American nonprofit anti-sexual assault organization, the largest in the United States. RAINN operates the National Sexual Assault Hotline, as well as the Department of Defense Safe Helpline, and carries out programs to prevent sexual assault, help survivors, and ensure that perpetrators are brought to justice through victim services, public education, public policy, and consulting services.

RAINN was founded in 1994 by Scott Berkowitz, with initial funding from The Atlantic Group and Warner Music Group. Tori Amos was the organization's first spokesperson. Christina Ricci has been the national spokesperson since April 25, 2007, and she is a member of its National Leadership Council.

== History ==
RAINN was founded in 1994 by Scott Berkowitz. In 2006, its National Sexual Assault Hotline received its one-millionth caller.

After the Senate unanimously reauthorized the Debbie Smith Act in May 2019, RAINN gathered 32,000 signatures from online petitions in hopes to push Senate Bill 820 toward House passage. The Debbie Smith Act, which aims to eliminate the backlog of untested DNA and rape kit evidence by allocating $151 million annually to state and local labs, was passed by the House in December 2019.

In February 2022, RAINN supported the EARN IT Act, which removes blanket immunity for violations of laws related to online child sexual abuse material (CSAM). U.S. Senators Richard Blumenthal and Lindsey Graham introduced bipartisan legislation to incentivize tech companies to remove child sexual abuse imagery on their platforms. Also in February, RAINN partnered with Congresswoman Deborah Ross and Congressman Dave Joyce on the Sexual Assault Nurse Examiners (SANEs) Act, which is designed to address the nationwide shortage of Sexual Assault Nurse Examiners (SANEs) and improve care for survivors of sexual violence. The SANEs Act was also endorsed by the American Nurses Association and the National Network to End Domestic Violence.

In April 2022, Insider published an article about RAINN's workplace culture in which 22 current and former staff members alleged racism and sexism. A rape survivor story by a higher-ranked Navy physician was chosen to be published on RAINN's web site, but later was not published due to Berkowitz not wanting to jeopardize RAINN's $2 million contract with the United States Department of Defense. When The Lily interviewed a woman for International Women's Day, she said she was tired of the homophobic lies about the LGBTQ community, which risk the murder of black trans women. The interview noted the woman was employed at RAINN. RAINN's vice president of communications said the interview was "too controversial" and might jeopardize RAINN's contract with the Department of Defense, and the employee was fired later that day. Six of RAINN's executives resigned soon after Insider published its investigation.

RAINN supported the PROTECT Our Children Act of 2022, which passed the United States Senate on November 15, 2022, as well as Congress on December 6, 2022. The act reauthorizes funding for the Internet Crimes Against Children Task Force (ICAC) and provides support to investigate and arrest perpetrators of sex offenses against children.

In December 2022, RAINN collaborated with HBO on an original documentary series titled Unveiled: Surviving La Luz Del Mundo, which tells the story of child sexual abuse within the La Luz del Mundo church.

=== National Sexual Assault Hotline ===
The National Sexual Assault Hotline is a 24-hour, toll-free phone service that routes callers to the nearest local sexual assault service provider. More than 1,000 local partnerships are associated with RAINN to provide sexual assault victims with free, confidential services. Since 2008, RAINN has provided anonymous, on-line crisis support through its National Sexual Assault Online Hotline via instant messaging.

Professional wrestler and writer Mick Foley is a member of RAINN's national leadership council and has worked as a volunteer on its online hotline. He became involved with the charity through his friendship with Tori Amos, his favorite musician. During a 15-month period ending in April 2011, Foley logged more than 550 hours talking to victims online. The same month, he offered to mow anyone's lawn who donated up to a certain amount to the organization, saying, "If you want to help survivors of sexual assault, or just want to see a big guy with long hair mowing your lawn in front of your friends, please take part..."

During the Depp v. Heard trial, RAINN noted an increase in hotline calls. RAINN says it provided help to 28% more people in May 2022 than in May 2021, and, on verdict day, it served 35% more people than on average. Following the premiere of Surviving R. Kelly III: The Final Chapter, calls to RAINN's National Sexual Assault Hotline increased by 46%.

=== RAINN Day ===
RAINN sponsors an annual campaign geared toward raising awareness and educating students about sexual violence, bystander intervention, and recovery resources on college campuses. Since 2018, RAINN Day is held every April to coincide with Sexual Assault Awareness and Prevention Month (SAAPM).

== Public positions ==
RAINN has published press releases in support of multiple survivors facing media scrutiny, including Christine Blasey Ford.

RAINN's president, Scott Berkowitz, has also issued multiple public statements, including his belief that arguing against the Keystone pipeline's expansion as a potential conduit of sexual violence is "unusual":

I've not heard this one before as an argument against the expansion of commerce, said Scott Berkowitz, president of Rape, Abuse & Incest National Network. Workplace-related violence is not terribly unusual, but I think that as an argument for or against a pipeline it's a little unusual.

When a former staff assistant in Joe Biden's U.S. Senate office alleged that Biden had sexually assaulted her in 1993, RAINN tweeted,

We appreciate Vice President Biden finally addressing Tara Reade's allegations. These allegations deserve a rigorous investigation, and we urge Vice President Biden to release any and all records that may be relevant, including those housed at the University of Delaware, in addition to any Senate records housed at the National Archives. We urge him, his campaign, and former staff to cooperate fully and provide complete transparency.

== Controversies ==
In 2014, RAINN attracted controversy for its criticism of the concept of rape culture and its promotion of primarily criminal justice system solutions in its recommendations to the White House Task Force to Protect Students from Sexual Assault. In response, Zerlina Maxwell created the hashtag "#RapeCultureIsWhen". Wagatwe Wanjuki, Amanda Marcotte, Jessica Valenti, and others asserted that rape culture exists and denounced relying on the criminal justice system to prevent sexual violence on college campuses.

In February 2025, journalist Mady Castigan noted that RAINN had recently removed references to trans people and trans survivors of sexual violence from their website as well as their entire "inclusion policy" on which groups they intend to serve. Castigan speculated that the change was related to the second Trump administration's restrictions on funding trans-supportive organizations. RAINN also prohibited employees and volunteers answering phone calls and text chats from recommending specialized resources for the LGBTQ community and other marginalized groups.

== See also ==
- Post-assault treatment of sexual assault victims
- Rape in the United States
