= Cycle of abuse =

Social cycle theory explaining patterns of behavior in an abusive relationship

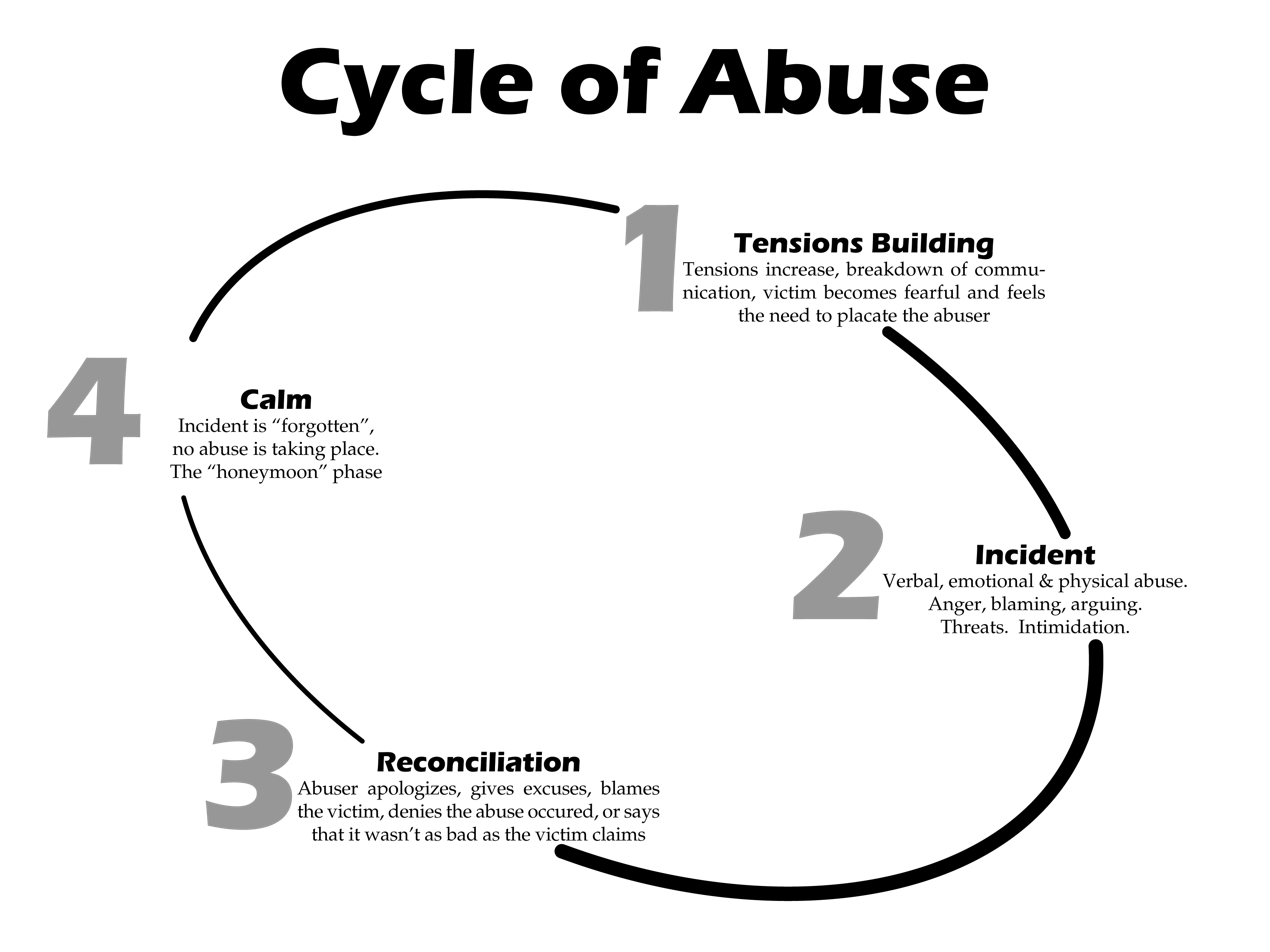
The four phases of the cycle of abuse

The cycle of abuse is a social cycle theory developed in 1979 by Lenore E. Walker to explain patterns of behavior in an abusive relationship. The phrase is also used more generally to describe any set of conditions which perpetuate abusive and dysfunctional relationships, such as abusive child rearing practices which tend to get passed down. Walker used the term more narrowly, to describe the cycling patterns of calm, violence, and reconciliation within an abusive relationship. Critics suggest the theory was based on inadequate research criteria, and cannot therefore be generalized upon.

== Overview ==
Lenore E. Walker interviewed 1,500 women who had been subject to domestic violence and found that there was a similar pattern of abuse, called the "cycle of abuse". Initially, Walker proposed that the cycle of abuse described the controlling, patriarchal behavior of men who felt entitled to abuse their wives to maintain control over them. She used the terms the battering cycle and battered woman syndrome. Terms like cycle of abuse have been used instead for different reasons: to maintain objectivity; because the cycle of abuse does not always lead to physical abuse; because symptoms of the syndrome have been observed in men and women, and are not confined to marriage and dating. Similarly, Dutton (1994) writes, "The prevalence of violence in homosexual relationships, which also appear to go through abuse cycles is hard to explain in terms of men dominating women."

The cycle of abuse concept is widely used in domestic violence programs, particularly in the United States. Critics have argued the theory is flawed as it does not apply as universally as Walker suggested, does not accurately or completely describe all abusive relationships, and may emphasize ideological presumptions rather than empirical data.

== Phases ==
The cycle usually goes in the following order, and will repeat until the conflict is stopped, usually by the survivor entirely abandoning the relationship or some form of intervention. The cycle can occur hundreds of times in an abusive relationship, the total cycle taking anywhere from a few hours to a year or more to complete. However, the length of the cycle usually diminishes over time so that the "reconciliation" and "calm" stages may disappear, violence becomes more intense and the cycles become more frequent.

=== 1: Tension building ===
Stress builds from the pressures of daily life, like conflict over children, marital issues, misunderstandings, or other family conflicts. It also builds as the result of illness, legal or financial problems, unemployment, or catastrophic events, like floods, rape or war. During this period, the abuser feels ignored, threatened, annoyed or wronged. The feeling lasts on average several minutes to hours, although it may last as long as several months.

To prevent violence, the victim may try to reduce the tension by becoming compliant and nurturing. Alternatively, the victim may provoke the abuser to get the abuse over with, prepare for the violence or lessen the degree of injury.

=== 2: Incident ===
During this stage, the abuser attempts to dominate their victim. Outbursts of violence and abuse occur which may include verbal abuse and psychological abuse.

In intimate partner violence, children are negatively affected by having witnessed the violence, and the partner's relationship degrades as well. The release of energy reduces the tension, and the abuser may feel or express that the victim "had it coming" to them.

=== 3: Reconciliation ===
The perpetrator may begin to feel remorse, guilty feelings, or fear that their partner will leave or call the police. The victim feels pain, fear, humiliation, disrespect, confusion, and may mistakenly feel responsible.

Characterized by affection, apology, or, alternatively, ignoring the incident, this phase marks an apparent end of violence, with assurances that it will never happen again, or that the abuser will do their best to change. During this stage the abuser may feel or claim to feel overwhelming remorse and sadness. Some abusers walk away from the situation with little comment, but most will eventually shower the survivor with love and affection. The abuser may use self-harm or threats of suicide to gain sympathy and/or prevent the survivor from leaving the relationship. Abusers are frequently so convincing, and survivors so eager for the relationship to improve, that survivors (who are often worn down and confused by longstanding abuse) stay in the relationship.

=== 4: Calm ===
During this phase (which is often considered an element of the honeymoon/reconciliation phase), the relationship is relatively calm and peaceful. During this period the abuser may agree to engage in counselling, ask for forgiveness, and create a normal atmosphere. In intimate partner relationships, the perpetrator may buy presents or the couple may engage in passionate sex. Over time, the abuser's apologies and requests for forgiveness become less sincere and are generally stated to prevent separation or intervention. However, interpersonal difficulties will inevitably arise, leading again to the tension building phase. The effect of the continual cycle may include loss of love, contempt, distress, and/or physical disability. Intimate partners may separate, divorce or, at the extreme, someone may be killed.

== Critiques ==
Walker's cycle of abuse theory was regarded as a revolutionary and important concept in the study of abuse and interpersonal violence, but as a useful model that may be simplistic. Scott Allen Johnson developed a 14-stage cycle that broke down the tension-building, acting-out and calm stages further. In his model, there are six stages in the "escalation" or tension building stage. These lead up to the assault by acting out the revenge plan, self-destructive behavior, victim grooming and the actual physical and/or sexual assault. This is followed by a sense of relief, fear of consequences, distraction, and rationalization of abuse.

Donald Dutton and Susan Golant agree that Walker's cycle of abuse describes the cyclically abusive relationships they studied. Nonetheless, they also note that her initial research was based almost entirely on anecdotal data from a rather small set of women who were in violent relationships. Walker herself wrote, "These women were not randomly selected and they cannot be considered a legitimate data base from which to make specific generalizations."

== See also ==
- Abusive power and control
- Adverse childhood experiences
- Culture of fear
- Domestic violence
- Gaslighting
- Idealization and devaluation
- Intermittent reinforcement
- Love bombing
- Narcissistic abuse
- Psychological manipulation
- Relational disorder
- Traumatic bonding
