= Sexual Violence: Opposing Viewpoints =

2003 book

- Editor: Helen Cothran
- Language: English
- Subject: Sexual violence
- Publisher: Greenhaven Press
- Publication date: 2003
- Publication place: United States
- Media type: Print (hardcover and paperback)
- Pages: 218
- ISBN: 0-7377-1240-6 (hardback); 0-7377-1239-2 (paperback)

Sexual Violence: Opposing Viewpoints is a 2003 book edited by Helen Cothran. It presents selections of contrasting viewpoints on four central questions about sexual violence: what causes it; whether it is a serious problem; how society should address it; and how it can be reduced. The book is part of the Opposing Viewpoints series.

== Contents ==
Chapter	Viewpoint	Author	Notes
Why Consider Opposing Viewpoints?
Introduction
Chapter 1: What Causes Sexual Violence?	1. Rape Is a Natural Biological Act	Randy Thornhill and Craig T. Palmer	Excerpt from A Natural History of Rape: Biological Bases of Sexual Coercion (MIT Press, 2000, hardcover, ISBN 0-262-20125-9; 2001, paperback, ISBN 0-262-70083-2).
Chapter 1: What Causes Sexual Violence?	2. Rape Is Not a Natural Biological Act	Barbara Ehrenreich	From "How 'Natural' Is Rape? Despite a Daffy New Theory, It's Not Just a Guy in Touch with His Inner Caveman", Time, January 31, 2000.
Chapter 1: What Causes Sexual Violence?	3. Pornography Causes Sexual Violence	Fear Us	From "Pornography", 2001, FearUs.org.
Chapter 1: What Causes Sexual Violence?	4. Pornography Does Not Cause Sexual Violence	American Civil Liberties Union	Reprint of "Why the ACLU Opposes Censorship of 'Pornography'", December 11, 1994.
Chapter 1: What Causes Sexual Violence?	5. Traditional Male/Female Roles Promote Sexual Violence	Alyn Pearson	Excerpt from "Rape Culture: It's All Around Us", off our backs, vol. 30, August 2000.
Chapter 1: What Causes Sexual Violence?	6. Rape Is Frequently Used as a Weapon of War	Barbara Crossette	Reprint of "An Old Scourge of War Becomes Its Latest Crime", The New York Times, June 14, 1998.
Chapter 1: What Causes Sexual Violence?	7. Schools Often Contribute to Child Sexual Abuse	Economist	Excerpt from "Passing the Trash: Sex Offenders", The Economist, April 6, 2002.
Chapter 2: Is Sexual Violence a Serious Problem?	1. Rape Is a Serious Problem	Mary P. Koss	Excerpt from "Acquaintance Rape: A Critical Update on Recent Findings with Application to Advocacy", 2000, Community Assessment Tool.
Chapter 2: Is Sexual Violence a Serious Problem?	2. The Prevalence of Rape Has Been Exaggerated	Neil Gilbert	Excerpt from "Realities and Mythologies of Rape", Society, vol. 35, January/February 1998, p. 356-7.
Chapter 2: Is Sexual Violence a Serious Problem?	3. Child Sexual Abuse Is a Serious Problem	Rebecca M. Bolen and Maria Scannapieco	From "Prevalence of Child Sexual Abuse: A Corrective Metanalysis", Social Service Review, vol. 73, September 1999, p. 281.
Chapter 2: Is Sexual Violence a Serious Problem?	4. Some Professionals Exaggerate the Problem of Child Sexual Abuse	Thomas D. Oellerich	Excerpt from "Identifying and Dealing with 'Child Savers'", Issues in Child Abuse Accusations, vol. 10, 1998, pp. 1–5, 7.
Chapter 2: Is Sexual Violence a Serious Problem?	5. Child Sexual Abuse By Priests Is Widespread	Andrew Sullivan	Reprint of "They Still Don't Get It: How Can a Church That Judges So Many Faithful Cover Up Its Own Offenses?", Time, vol. 159, March 4, 2002, p. 55.
Chapter 2: Is Sexual Violence a Serious Problem?	6. Child Sexual Abuse By Priests Is Not Widespread	Wilton D. Gregory	Reprint of "We Must Be Ceaselessly on Guard", National Catholic Reporter, vol. 28, March 1, 2002, p. 15.
Chapter 3: How Should Society Address Sexual Victimization?	1. Women Should Tell Their Stories of Sexual Victimization	Martha T. McCluskey	From "Transforming Victimization", Tikkun, vol. 9, March/April 1994, pp. 54–57.
Chapter 3: How Should Society Address Sexual Victimization?	2. Women Should Avoid Claiming Status as Victims	Katie Roiphe	Excerpt from The Morning After: Sex, Fear, and Feminism (Little Brown & Co., 1993, hardcover, ISBN 0-316-75431-5; Back Bay Books, 1994, paperback, ISBN 0-316-75432-3).
Chapter 3: How Should Society Address Sexual Victimization?	3. Repressed Memories of Sexual Abuse Are Valid	James Lein	Excerpt from "Recovered Memories: Context and Controversy", Social Work, vol. 44, September 1999, 481–499.
Chapter 3: How Should Society Address Sexual Victimization?	4. Repressed Memories of Sexual Abuse Are a Hoax	Rael Jean Isaac	Excerpt from "Sex, Lies, and Audiotapes", Women's Quarterly, Summer 2001, p. 7.
Chapter 3: How Should Society Address Sexual Victimization?	5. Battered Woman Syndrome Is a Valid Defense	Douglas A. Orr	Excerpt from "Weiand v. State and Battered Spouse Syndrome", Florida Bar Journal, vol. 74, June 2000, p. 14.
Chapter 3: How Should Society Address Sexual Victimization?	6. Battered Woman Syndrome Is Not a Valid Defense	Joe Wheeler Dixon	Reprint of "Battered Woman Syndrome", January 2002.
Chapter 4: How Can Sexual Violence Be Reduced?	1. Chemical Castration Can Help Reduce Sexual Violence	Christopher Meisenkothen	Reprint of "Chemical Castration — Breaking the Cycle of Paraphiliac Recidivism", Social Justice, vol. 26, Spring 1999, pp. 139–54.
Chapter 4: How Can Sexual Violence Be Reduced?	2. Chemical Castration Is Unconstitutional and Often Ineffective	Larry Helm Spalding	Excerpt from "Florida's 1997 Chemical Castration Law: A Return to the Dark Ages", Florida State University Law Review, 1998.
Chapter 4: How Can Sexual Violence Be Reduced?	3. Community Notification Laws Can Help Reduce Sexual Violence	Alan D. Scholle	Excerpt from "Sex Offender Registration", The FBI Law Enforcement Bulletin, vol. 69, July 2000, p. 17.
Chapter 4: How Can Sexual Violence Be Reduced?	4. Community Notification Laws May Be Ineffective	Joshua Wolf Shenk	Reprint of "Do 'Megan's Laws' Make a Difference?", U.S. News & World Report, vol. 124, March 9, 1998, p. 27.
Chapter 4: How Can Sexual Violence Be Reduced?	5. Rape Shield Laws Are Necessary	Mary E. Bahl	Reprint of "Rape Shield Laws: Who Really Needs Protecting?", Impact Press, 2000.
Chapter 4: How Can Sexual Violence Be Reduced?	6. Rape Shield Laws Are Unfair	Cathy Young	Reprint of "Don't Shield Juries from the Truth in Sex Cases", The Wall Street Journal, April 20, 1998, p. A19.
For Further Discussion
Organizations to Contact
Bibliography of Books
Index

== See also ==
- Sociobiological theories of rape
