= Against Our Will =

1975 book by Susan Brownmiller

Against Our Will: Men, Women and Rape
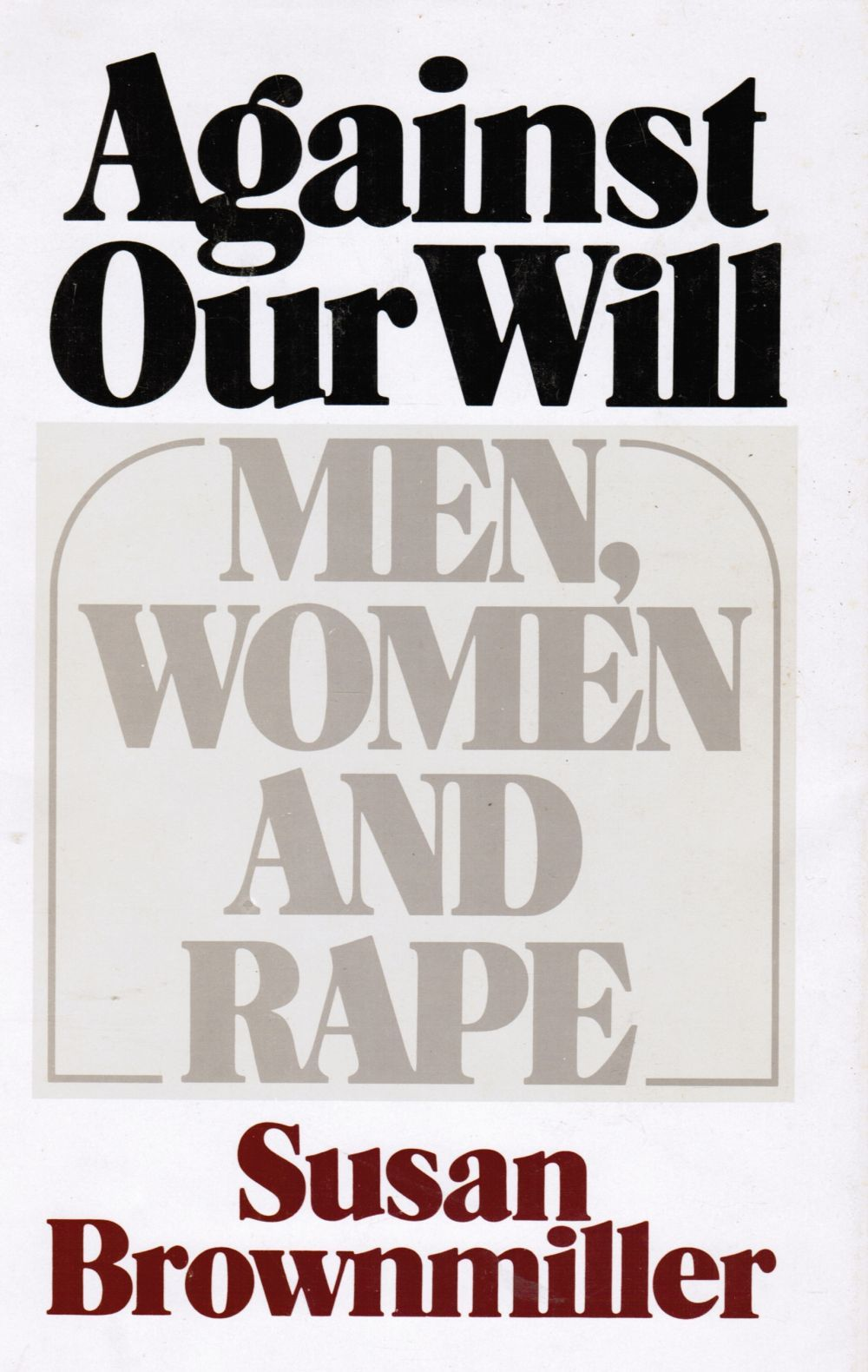
- Cover of the first edition
- Author: Susan Brownmiller
- Language: English
- Subject: Rape
- Publisher: Simon & Schuster
- Publication date: 1975
- Publication place: United States
- Media type: Print (hardcover and paperback)
- Pages: 472
- ISBN: 0-671-22062-4

Against Our Will: Men, Women and Rape is a 1975 book about rape by Susan Brownmiller, in which the author argues that rape is "a conscious process of intimidation by which all men keep all women in a state of fear."

== Summary ==
Brownmiller criticizes authors such as Richard von Krafft-Ebing, Sigmund Freud, Karl Marx, and Friedrich Engels for what she considers their oversights on the subject of rape. She defines rape as "a conscious process of intimidation by which all men keep all women in a state of fear". She writes that, to her knowledge, no zoologist has ever observed that animals rape in their natural habitat. Brownmiller sought to examine general belief systems that women who were raped deserved it, as discussed by Clinton Duffy and others. She discusses rape in war, challenges the Freudian concept of women's rape fantasies, and compares it to the gang lynchings of African Americans by white men. This comparison was used to show how lynching was once considered acceptable by communities, and then attitudes changed, followed by changed laws; Brownmiller hoped the same would happen with rape.

== Reception ==
Against Our Will is credited by some with changing the public outlook and attitudes about rape. It is cited as having influenced changes in law regarding rape, such as state criminal codes that required a corroborating witness to a rape, and that permitted a defendant's lawyer to introduce evidence in court regarding a victim's prior sexual history. Mary Ellen Gale wrote in The New York Times Book Review that Against Our Will "deserves a place on the shelf next to those rare books about social problems which force us to make connections we have too long evaded, and change the way we feel about what we know." Time magazine described Brownmiller's thesis as "startling," and called Against Our Will a "convincing and awesome portrait of men's cruelty to women." The book was included in the "Women Rise" category of the New York Public Library's Books of the Century. The critic Christopher Lehmann-Haupt gave the book a mostly positive review in The New York Times, noting that Brownmiller "organized an enormous body of information into a multipurposed tool" that gave a program for modernizing rape laws while considering the treatment of rape in war overly detailed and numbing.

Others have taken a more critical view of the work. Scholar John Lauritsen dismissed Against Our Will, calling it "a shoddy piece of work from start to finish: ludicrously inaccurate, reactionary, dishonest, and vulgarly written."

Angela Davis was highly critical of Against Our Will, writing that, "It can't be denied that Brownmiller's book is a pioneering scholarly contribution to the contemporary literature on rape. Yet many of her arguments are pervaded with racist ideas," including “the resuscitation of the old racist myth of the Black rapist,” and the reinterpretation of the lynching of Emmett Till to claim that the young victim and his killers were "exclusively concerned about their rights of possession over women,” and that Till himself was “a guilty sexist, almost as guilty as his white racist murderers.” Davis further argued that Brownmiller disregarded the part that black women played in the anti-lynching movement.

Brownmiller's conclusions about rapists' motivations have been criticized by the anthropologist Donald Symons in The Evolution of Human Sexuality (1979), and by Randy Thornhill and Craig T. Palmer in A Natural History of Rape (2000). The historian Peter Gay wrote that Against Our Will "deserves pride of place among (rightly) indignant" feminist discussions of rape, but that Brownmiller's treatment of Sigmund Freud is unfair.

The critic Camille Paglia called Against Our Will well-meaning, but nevertheless dismissed it as an example of "the limitations of white middle-class assumptions in understanding extreme emotional states or acts." The behavioral ecologist John Alcock wrote that while Brownmiller claimed that no zoologist had ever observed animals raping in their natural habitat, there was already "ample evidence" of forced copulations among animals in 1975, and that further evidence has accumulated since then.
