= Money burning =

Deliberate burning of money for effect

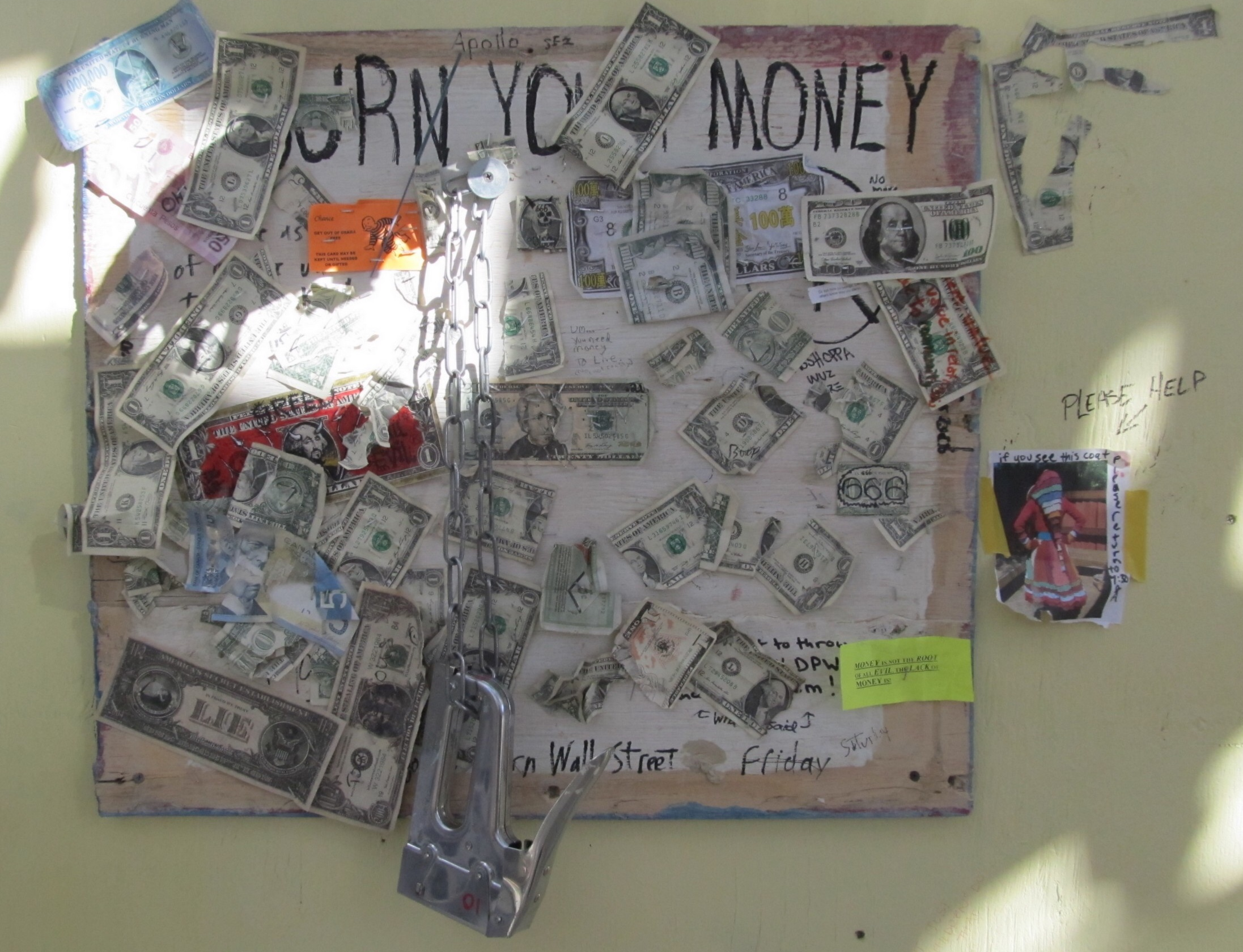
Burn Your Money, an interactive artwork at Center Camp, Burning Man, was later burned at the Burn Wall Street artwork on the playa.

Money burning or burning money is the purposeful act of destroying money. In the prototypical example, banknotes are destroyed by setting them on fire. Burning money decreases the wealth of the owner without directly enriching any particular party. It also reduces the money supply and (very slightly) slows down the inflation rate.

Money is usually burned to communicate a message, either for artistic effect, as a form of protest, or as a signal. The burning of money is illegal in some jurisdictions. Burning may also occur in cryptocurrency, when tokens are permanently removed from a blockchain's circulating supply, typically by sending them to an address with no private key, making them permanently inaccessible.

== Macroeconomic effect ==
For the purposes of macroeconomics, burning money is equivalent to removing the money from circulation, and locking it away forever; the salient feature is that no one may ever use the money again. Burning money shrinks the money supply, and is therefore a special case of contractionary monetary policy that can be implemented by anyone. In the usual case, the central bank withdraws money from circulation by selling government bonds or foreign currency. The difference with money burning is that the central bank does not have to exchange any assets of value for the money burnt. Money burning is thus equivalent to gifting the money back to the central bank (or other money issuing authority). If the economy is at full employment equilibrium, shrinking the money supply causes deflation (or decreases the rate of inflation), increasing the real value of the money left in circulation.

Assuming that the burned money is paper money with negligible intrinsic value, no real goods are destroyed, so the overall wealth of the world is unaffected. Instead, all surviving money slightly increases in value; everyone gains wealth in proportion to the amount of money they already hold. Economist Steven Landsburg proposes in The Armchair Economist that burning one's fortune (in paper money) is a form of philanthropy more egalitarian than deeding it to the United States Treasury. In 1920, Thomas Nixon Carver wrote that dumping money into the sea is better for society than spending it wastefully, as the latter wastes the labor that it hires.

=== Opposites ===
Central banks routinely collect and destroy worn-out coins and banknotes in exchange for new ones. This does not affect the money supply, and is done to maintain a healthy population of usable currency. The practice raises an interesting possibility. If an individual can steal the money before it is incinerated, the effect is the opposite of burning money; the thief is enriched at the expense of the rest of society. One such incident at the Bank of England inspired the 2001 TV movie Hot Money and the 2008 film Mad Money.

Another, more common near-opposite is the creation of counterfeit money. Undetected counterfeit decreases the value of existing money—one of the reasons why attempting to pass it is illegal in most jurisdictions and is aggressively investigated. Another way to analyze the cost of forgery is to consider the effects of a central bank's monetary policy. Taking the United States as an example, if the Federal Reserve decides that the monetary base should be a given amount, then every $100 bill forged is a bill the Fed cannot print and use to buy Treasury bonds. The interest earnings (after expenses) on those bonds is turned over to the US Treasury, so any lost interest must be made up by U.S. taxpayers, who therefore bear the cost of counterfeiting.

== Rationales ==
Behaviorally speaking, burning money is usually seen as a purely negative act. The cognitive impact of burning money can even be a useful motivational tool: patients who suffer from nail biting may be trained to burn a dollar bill every time they engage in the habit. One study found this form of suppression training by self-punishment to be effective compared to control groups, although not as effective as substitution training.

On the other hand, there are some situations where burning money might not be so unreasonable. It is said that the ancient Greek philosopher Aristippus was once on a ship at sea when he was threatened by pirates; he took out his money, counted it, and dropped it into the sea, commenting, "Better for the money to perish because of Aristippus than vice versa." Cicero would later cite this episode as an example of a circumstance that must be considered in its full context: "...it is a useless act to throw money into the sea; but not with the design which Aristippus had when he did so."

Since around 2015, the UK has experienced a surge of interest in money burning. This has been noted in both the book The Mysterium and in a Kindred Spirit article that is reprinted in International Times. An annual Mass Burn Event - where people are invited to burn money - is held at the Cockpit Theatre in London every autumn.

=== Symbolism ===
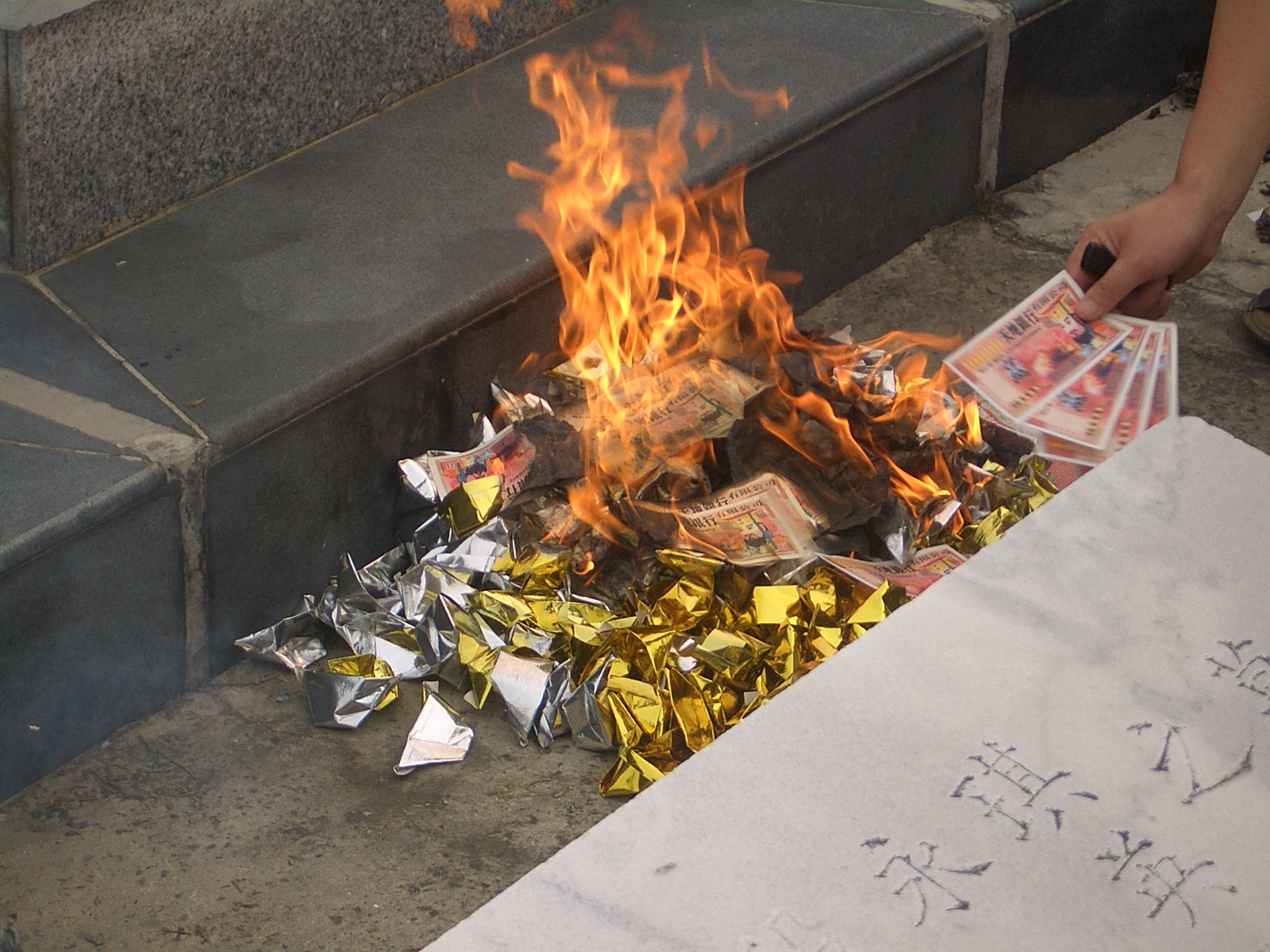
Joss paper burned near the time of the Ghost Festival as an offering to the departed

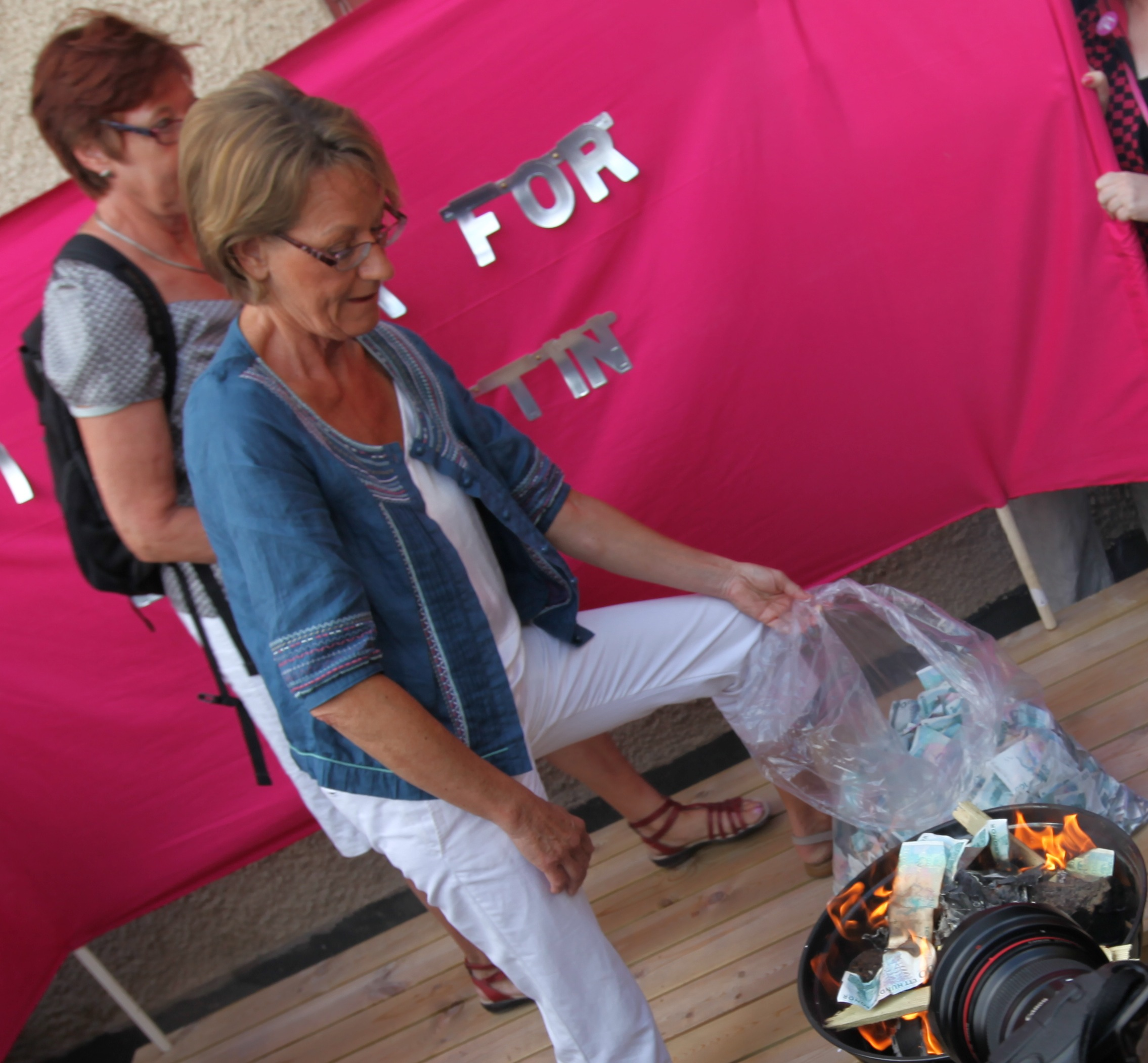
Swedish politician Gudrun Schyman burning money to protest inequality

Publicly burning money can be an act of protest or a kind of artistic statement. Often the point is to emphasize money's intrinsic worthlessness.

In 1984, Serge Gainsbourg burned a 500 French franc note on television to protest against heavy taxation.

On 23 August 1994, the K Foundation (an art duo consisting of Bill Drummond and Jimmy Cauty) burned one million pounds sterling in cash on the Scottish island of Jura. This money represented the bulk of the K Foundation's funds, earned by Drummond and Cauty as The KLF, one of the United Kingdom's most successful pop groups of the early 1990s. The duo have never fully explained their motivations for the burning.

In the 1995 film Dead Presidents, the title sequence directed by Kyle Cooper features close shots of burning U.S. bills; it took two days of shooting and experimenting with the paper to get the effect right.

In the early 18th century, New York City courts would publicly burn the counterfeit bills they gathered, to show that they were both dangerous and worthless.

In traditional Chinese and Vietnamese ancestor veneration, imitation money in the form of joss paper are ceremonially burned, with the aspiration that the dead may use the money to finance a more comfortable afterlife.

In 2010, the spokesperson for the Swedish Feminist Initiative, Gudrun Schyman, burned SEK 100,000 during a speech about the inequality in wages for men and women.

In 2018, a collective of artists called Distributed Gallery have created a machine named Chaos Machine which burns banknotes and turns them into cryptocurrencies while playing music.

=== Game theory ===
In game theory, a threat to burn money can affect the strategies of the players involved; a classic example is the situation described as 'battle of the sexes', where the ability to burn money allows the player to achieve the desired equilibrium without actually having to burn money.

=== For commodity value ===
Fiat money can sometimes be destroyed by converting it into commodity form, rather than completely forfeiting the value of the money. Sometimes, currency intended for use as fiat money becomes more valuable as a commodity, usually when inflation causes its face value to fall below its intrinsic value. For example, in India in 2007, Rupee coins disappeared from the market when their face value dropped below the value of the stainless steel from which they were made. Similarly, in 1965, the US government had to switch from silver to copper-nickel clad quarter coins because the silver value of the coins had exceeded their face value and were being melted down by individuals for profit. The same occurred to 5-franc coins of Switzerland, which up to the year 1969 were minted using a silver alloy. At the peak of hyperinflation in the Weimar Republic, people burned banknotes for warmth, as their face value had fallen below their value as fuel.

== Legality ==
The legality of money burning varies with jurisdiction.

=== Australia ===
Section 16 of the Crimes (Currency) Act 1981 prohibits deliberate damage and destruction of Australian money without a relevant legal permit. The law covers both current Australian money and historical coins and notes. Breaking this law can lead to detention or a fine.

According to this law, even writing words on a banknote can be punished.

=== Brazil ===
In Brazil, whether it is illegal for a person to burn their own money is a controversial topic. It is not mentioned explicitly in Brazilian law. João Sidney Figueiredo Filho, has affirmed that "when money is inside the Central Bank, then it is the property of the National Treasury. When it leaves, it is not." But the chief of police Jéferson Botelho Pereira has concluded that "whoever rips money is committing a crime against the property of the Union".

The production of paper money by the State Bank is under the exclusive authority of the Central Bank, and is issued by the Brazilian Union. By that reasoning, the paper on which the money is printed is the property of the State, and its intrinsic value belongs to the person. Articles 98 and 99 of the New Brazilian Civil Code give "money" its own definition. This is because a banknote cannot become a common good, if the owner himself decides to keep it in his possession indefinitely. This makes money different from other state assets such as rivers, seas, streets, roads and piazzas, which are all immobile.

=== Canada ===
The Currency Act states that "no person shall melt down, break up or use otherwise than as currency any coin that is legal tender in Canada." Similarly, Section 456 of The Criminal Code of Canada says: "Every one who (a) defaces a current coin, or (b) utters a current coin that has been defaced, is guilty of an offence punishable on summary conviction."

However neither the Currency Act nor Criminal Code mention paper currency. It therefore remains legal to completely destroy paper currency.

=== Eurozone ===
According to the European Commission's Recommendation dated 22 March 2010, "Member states must not prohibit or punish the complete destruction of small quantities of Euro coins or notes when this happens in private. However they must prohibit the unauthorised destruction of large amounts of Euro coins or notes." Also, "Member states must not encourage the mutilation of Euro notes or coins for artistic purposes, but they are required to tolerate it. Mutilated coins or notes should be considered unfit for circulation."

The European Union defines "falsifying or fraudulently altering money in any way" as a crime. Also, according to the EU ruling 1210/2010, "all money that is unfit for circulation must be delivered to the relevant national authority". EU countries must remove the currency from circulation and reimburse the holder", no matter what the country of issue.

The European Central Bank has established that "Member states may refuse to reimburse Euro money that has been deliberately rendered unfit for circulation, or where it has been caused by a process that would predictably have led to the money becoming unfit. The exception to this is money collected for charitable purposes, such as coins thrown into a fountain". The ECB legal department also states "the ECB will refuse to replace money that has been stamped for advertising purposes".

The European Union provides an obligation at the community level to retire "neutralized" notes from circulation, or those rendered unfit for security systems.

=== New Zealand ===
Section 154 of the Reserve Bank of New Zealand Act 2021 makes it an offence to wilfully deface, disfigure, or mutilate any bank note in New Zealand. The penalty is a fine of up to NZ$1,000.

=== Philippines ===
By Presidential Decree No. 247, willful mutilation of coins or notes is punishable by a fine of up to ₱20,000, imprisonment up to 5 years, or both.

=== Singapore ===
Singapore's Currency Act states that any person who mutilate, destroy, deface, or causes any change (to diminish value/utility of) currency note or coin is fined up to $2,000.

=== Sri Lanka ===
The Central Bank of Sri Lanka Act No.16 of 2023 makes mutilation of bank notes an offence punishable by imprisonment, a fine, or both.

=== Taiwan ===
Intentionally damaging coins or notes, and rendering them unusable, is fined up to 5 times the nominal value of such coins or notes.

=== Turkey ===
In Turkey, defacement or destruction of banknotes can be punished with fines or with prison sentences.

=== United Kingdom ===
The Currency and Bank Notes Act 1928 is an Act of the Parliament of the United Kingdom relating to banknotes. Among other things, it makes it a criminal offence to deface a banknote (but not to destroy one). Under Section 10 of the Coinage Act 1971 "No person shall, except under the authority of a licence granted by the Treasury, melt down or break up any metal coin which is for the time being current in the United Kingdom or which, having been current there, has at any time after 16th May 1969 ceased to be so." As the process of creating elongated coins does not require them to be melted nor broken up, however, Section 10 does not apply and coin elongation is legal within the UK with penny press machines.

=== United States ===
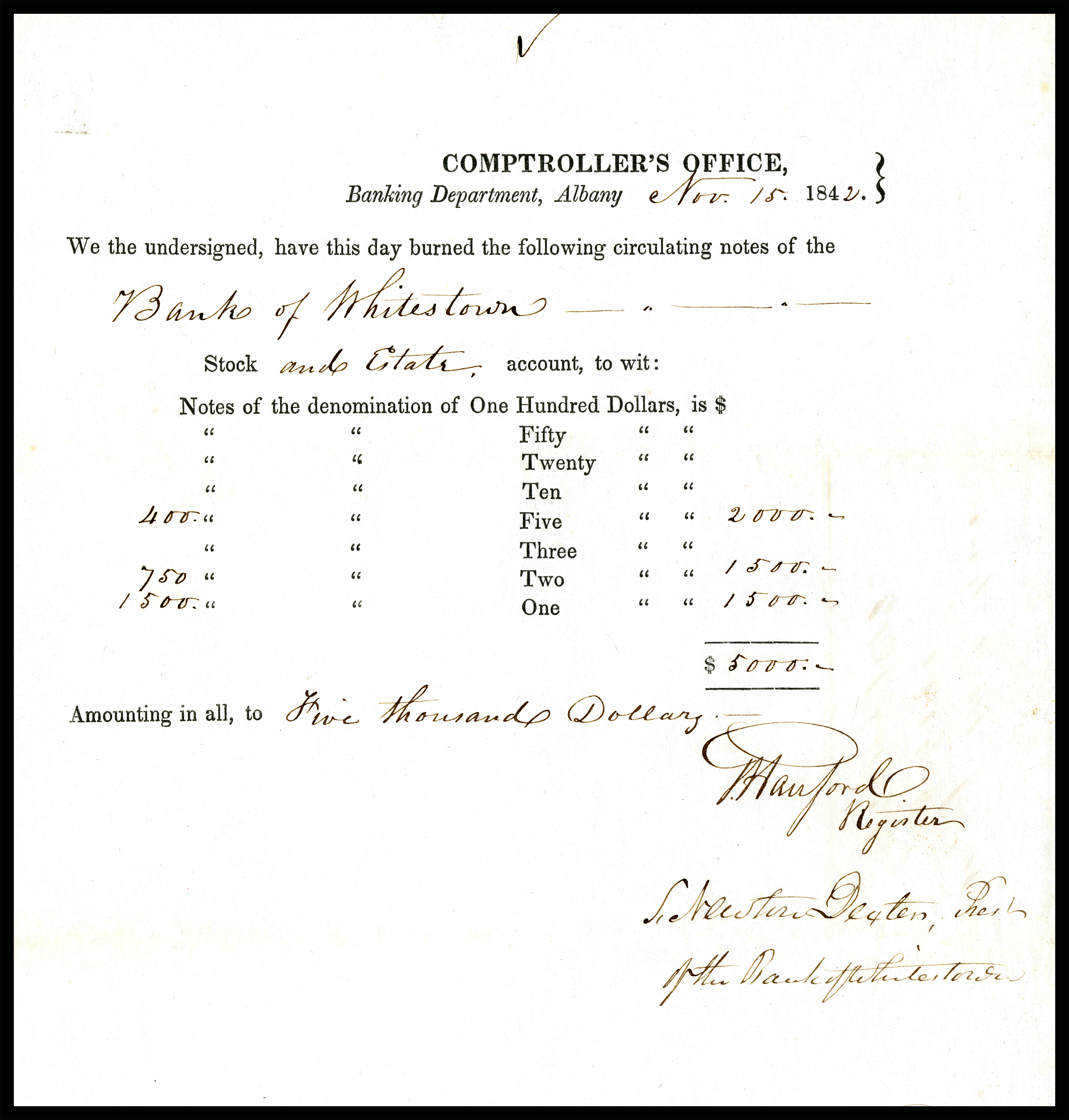
A receipt from the Albany, New York Comptroller's Office certifying that $5,000 from the Bank of Whitestown had been legally destroyed by burning on 15 November 1842

In the United States, burning banknotes is prohibited under 18 U.S.C. § 333: Mutilation of national bank obligations, which includes "any other thing" that renders a note "unfit to be reissued". In an amicus brief for Atwater v. City of Lago Vista, Solicitor General Seth Waxman writes that arresting an individual who removes the corner dollar values "may expose a counterfeiting operation". It is unclear if the statute has ever been applied in response to the complete destruction of a bill. Certainly people have publicly burned small amounts of money for political protests that were picked up by the media — Living Things at South by Southwest, Larry Kudlow on The Call, both in 2009 — without apparent consequence.

The question of legality has been compared to the much more politically charged issue of flag desecration. It can be argued that the desecration of the flag is comparable to the desecration of a photograph of Legal Tender (provided it was modified as to not violate counterfeiting laws). In 1989, in a Senate Judiciary Committee hearing on the Flag Protection Act, William Barr testified that any regulation protecting something purely for its symbolic value would be struck down as unconstitutional. The Senate report recommending passage of the Act argued that Barr's theory would render 18 U.S.C. § 333 unconstitutional as well. In a dissent in Smith v. Goguen, Justice Rehnquist counted 18 U.S.C. § 333 in a group of statutes in which the Government protects its interest in some private property which is "not a traditional property interest". On the other hand, the Government's interest in protecting circulating currency might not be purely symbolic; it costs the Bureau of Engraving and Printing approximately 5 cents to replace a note.

Legal Tender, a 1996 telerobotic art installation by Ken Goldberg, Eric Paulos, Judith Donath, and Mark Pauline, was an experiment to see if the law could instill a sense of physical risk in online interactions. After participants were advised that 18 U.S.C. § 333 threatened them with up to six months in jail, they were given the option of remotely defacing small portions of a pair of "purportedly authentic" $100 bills over the web. A crime may be occurring — but "only if the bills are real, the web site is authentic, and the experiment actually performed." In fact, one bill was real and the other counterfeit. Almost all of the participants reported that they believed the experiment and the bills to be faked.

The destruction of money is also bound by the same laws that govern the destruction of other personal property. In particular, one cannot empower the executor of one's estate to burn one's money after one dies.

== See also ==
- Crop burning
- Fireproof banknote
- K Foundation Burn a Million Quid – 1994 work of performance art
- Money to Burn – 2010 work of performance art
