= Joel John Bailey =

Canadian association football player (born 1980)

Joel Bailey
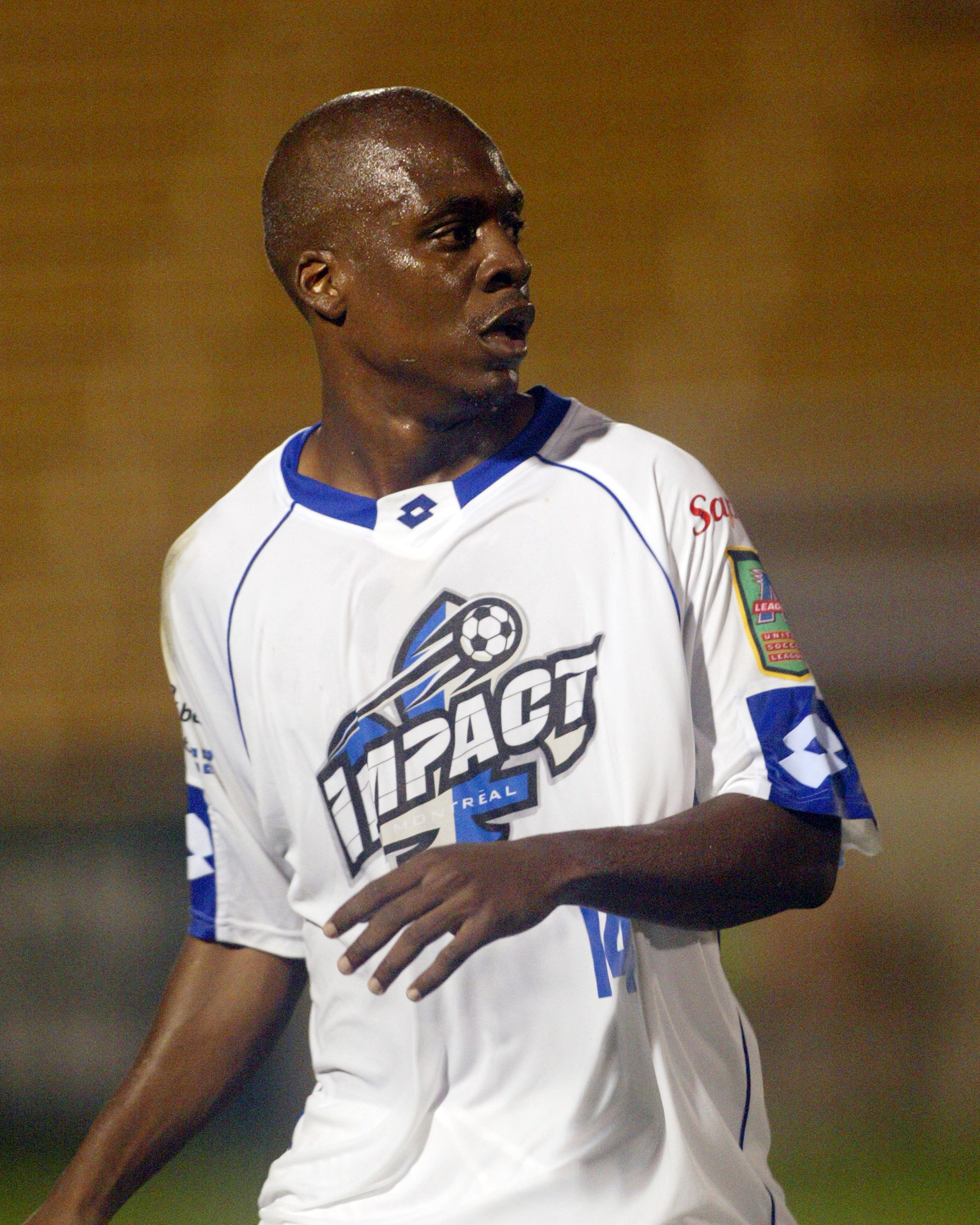

Personal information
- Full name: Joel John Bailey
- Date of birth: 17 February 1980 (age 46)
- Place of birth: San Fernando, Trinidad and Tobago
- Height: 5 ft 11 in (1.80 m)
- Position: Forward

College career
Years	Team	Apps	(Gls)
- Wheeling Jesuit Cardinals

Senior career*
Years	Team	Apps	(Gls)
2003–2005	Cleveland Force (indoor)	40	(14)
2004–2006	Montreal Impact	43	(6)
2005–2006	Baltimore Blast (indoor)	33	(12)
2007	Vancouver Whitecaps	14	(0)
2007	Carolina RailHawks	6	(1)
Total		136	(33)

International career
2007	Trinidad and Tobago	4	(0)
- * Club domestic league appearances and goals

Joel John Bailey (born February 17, 1980) is a Canadian forward who last played for the Carolina RailHawks of the USL First Division. He played three seasons in Major Indoor Soccer League.

== Club career ==
=== Indoor ===
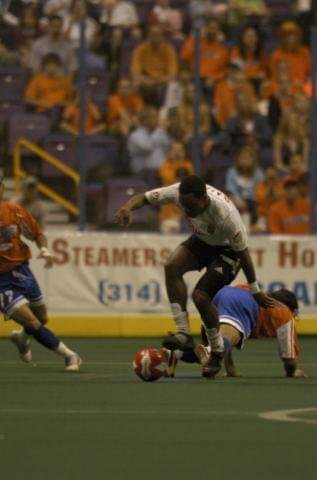

Bailey began his indoor soccer career in 2003 with the now defunct Cleveland Force of Major Indoor Soccer League. On March 29, 2005, the Force traded Bailey and Sipho Sibiya to the Baltimore Blast for Neil Gilbert and Allen Eller. During the 2005–2006 season, Bailey played twenty-nine games with the MISL championship winning Blast and he left indoor soccer at the end of the season.

=== Outdoor ===
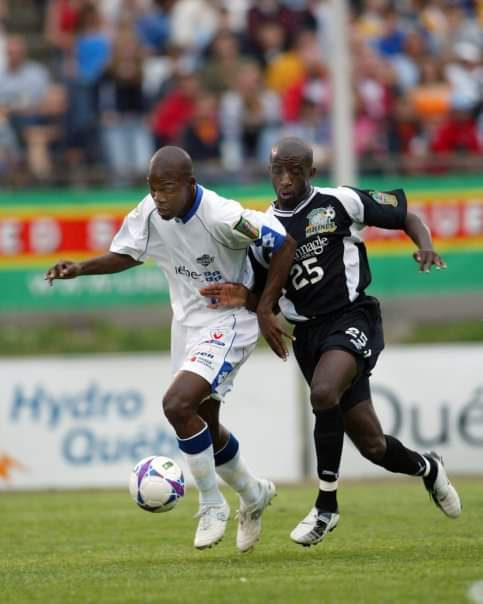

He began his outdoor career with the Montreal Impact in 2004 where he finished fourth in scoring and helped the Impact win the championship. In 2005, he signed a two-year contract, but was waived at the end of the 2006 season.

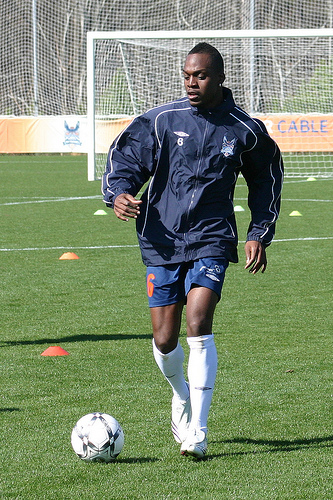

He signed with the Vancouver Whitecaps in 2007, and was traded mid-season to the RailHawks in exchange for Sola Abolaji.

== International career ==
Bailey made his debut for Trinidad and Tobago in a January 2007 CONCACAF Gold Cup qualifying match against Martinique, coming on as a substitute for Darryl Roberts. He has earned a total of 4 caps.
