= The Death Penalty: Opposing Viewpoints =

1986 non-fiction book

- Editor: Mary E. Williams
- Series: Opposing Viewpoints series
- Publisher: Greenhaven Press
- ISBN: 978-1565105096

The Death Penalty: Opposing Viewpoints is a book in the Opposing Viewpoints series. It presents selections of contrasting viewpoints on the death penalty: first surveying centuries of debate on it; then questioning whether it is just; whether it is an effective deterrent; and whether it is applied fairly. It was edited by Mary E. Williams.

Now in its sixth edition, it was published by Greenhaven Press of San Diego in 2006. Earlier editions were published in 1986, 1991, 1997, 1998, and 2002.

== Contents of the 2002 edition ==
Chapter	Viewpoint	Author	Notes
Why Consider Opposing Viewpoints?
Introduction
Chapter 1: Three Centuries of Debate on the Death Penalty	1. The Death Penalty Will Discourage Crime (1701)	Paper presented before the English parliament	Excerpt from Hanging Not Punishment Enough for Murtherers, High-way Men, and House-Breakers (Transaction Publishers, 1990, hardcover ISBN 0-88738-369-6 and paperback ISBN 0-88738-858-2).
Chapter 1: Three Centuries of Debate on the Death Penalty	2. The Death Penalty Will Not Discourage Crime (1764)	Cesare Beccaria	Excerpt from An Essay on Crimes and Punishments .
Chapter 1: Three Centuries of Debate on the Death Penalty	3. Society Must Retain the Death Penalty for Murder (1868)	John Stuart Mill	Excerpt from "Speech In Favor of Capital Punishment," in Hansard's Parliamentary Debate.
Chapter 1: Three Centuries of Debate on the Death Penalty	4. The Death Penalty Is State-Sanctioned Murder (1872)	Horace Greeley	Excerpt from Hints Toward Reforms: In Lectures, Addresses, and Other Writings (Fowlers and Wells, 1853; Elibron Classics, 2005, paperback, ISBN 1-4021-7271-0).
Chapter 1: Three Centuries of Debate on the Death Penalty	5. Capital Punishment Is a Safeguard for Society (1925)	Robert E. Crowe	Excerpt from "Capital Punishment Protects Society," The Forum, February 1925.
Chapter 1: Three Centuries of Debate on the Death Penalty	6. Capital Punishment Will Not Safeguard Society (1928)	Clarence Darrow	Excerpt from "The Futility of the Death Penalty," The Forum, September 1928.
Chapter 2: Is the Death Penalty Just?	1. The Death Penalty Is Unjust	Progressive	From "The Case Against the Death Penalty," editorial, The Progressive, February 2000.
Chapter 2: Is the Death Penalty Just?	2. THE Death Penalty Is Just!	Ernest van den Haag	Excerpt from "Justice, Deterrence, and the Death Penalty," chapter 5 of America's Experiment With Capital Punishment: Reflections on the Past, Present, and Future of the Ultimate Penal Sanction, edited by James R. Acker, Robert M. Bohm, and Charles S. Lanier (Carolina Academic Press, 1998, ISBN 0-89089-651-8; 2003, ISBN 0-89089-064-1).
Chapter 2: Is the Death Penalty Just?	3. The Death Penalty Violates the Sanctity of Life	John Kavanaugh	From "Killing Persons, Killing Ethics," America, July 19–26, 1997.
Chapter 2: Is the Death Penalty Just?	4. The Death Penalty Affirms the Sanctity of Life	Michael D. Bradbury	Reprint of "The Death Penalty Is an Affirmation of the Sanctity of Life," Los Angeles Times, 24 September 2000.
Chapter 2: Is the Death Penalty Just?	5. The Death Penalty is Cruel and Unusual Punishment	Peter L. Berger	From "Beyond the 'Humanly Tolerable'," National Review, July 17, 2000.
Chapter 2: Is the Death Penalty Just?	6. The Death Penalty Is Not Cruel and Unusual Punishment	Michael Scaljon	Reprint of "Liberals, Death-Penalty Protesters Endanger Society," Daily Texan, July 2, 1998.
Chapter 2: Is the Death Penalty Just?	7. Executions Deliver Reasonable Retribution	Pat Buchanan	Reprint of "Death Penalty Is Act of Retribution, Not Revenge," Conservative Chronicle, February 18, 1998.
Chapter 2: Is the Death Penalty Just?	8. Executions Do Not Deliver Reasonable Retribution	Marvin E. Wolfgang	Excerpt from "We Do Not Deserve to Kill," Crime and Delinquency, January 1989.
Chapter 3: Is the Death Penalty an Effective Deterrent?	1. The Death Penalty Deters Crime	Jay Johansen	Reprint of "Does Capital Punishment Deter Crime?," March 29, 1998.
Chapter 3: Is the Death Penalty an Effective Deterrent?	2. The Death Penalty Does Not Deter Crime	Christine Notis and Edward Hunter	Part I: Reprint (minus endnotes) of "Is the Death Penalty an Effective Deterrent?," 1997. Part II: "Experts Agree: Death Penalty Not a Deterrent to Violent Crime", January 15, 1997.
Chapter 3: Is the Death Penalty an Effective Deterrent?	3. The Death Penalty Increases the Violent Crime Rate	Paul H. Rosenberg	Reprint of "Bush, Gore Both Wrong on Death Penalty Deterrence." 18 October 1999.
Chapter 3: Is the Death Penalty an Effective Deterrent?	4. Executions Deter Felony Murders	William Tucker	Reprint of "The Chair Deters," National Review, July 17, 2000.
Chapter 3: Is the Death Penalty an Effective Deterrent?	5. A High Conviction Rate Is a Stronger Deterrent Than the Death Penalty	Steven E. Landsburg	Reprint of "Does Crime Pay? Yes, for Those Who Don't Wince at the Small Chance of a Big Punishment," Slate, December 8, 1999.
Chapter 4: Is the Death Penalty Applied Fairly?	1. Wrongful Executions are Unlikely	Eugene H. Methvin	Reprint of "Death Penalty Is Fairer Than Ever," Wall Street Journal, May 10, 2000.
Chapter 4: Is the Death Penalty Applied Fairly?	2. Wrongful Executions are Likely	Clarence Page and Richard Cohen	Part I: From "'System Works'? Whose System?," Liberal Opinion Week, February 22, 1999. Part II: "The Vain Search for Deadly Accuracy," The Washington Post, April 20, 2000.
Chapter 4: Is the Death Penalty Applied Fairly?	3. DNA Evidence Reveals the Fallibility of Death Penalty Trials	Washington Post National Weekly Edition	Reprint of "Another DNA Exoneration," editorial, The Washington Post, January 25, 2001.
Chapter 4: Is the Death Penalty Applied Fairly?	4. DNA Evidence Will Increase Public Confidence in Death Penalty Trails	Gregg Easterbrook	Excerpt from "The Myth of Fingerprints: DNA and the End of Innocence," The New Republic, July 31, 2000.
Chapter 4: Is the Death Penalty Applied Fairly?	5. The Death Penalty Is Discriminatory	Mark Costanzo and Friends Committee on National Legislation	Part I: Reprint of "How Murderers Can Avoid the Executioner," The San Diego Union-Tribune, January 14, 1998. Part II: "The Death Penalty: Is It Arbitrary, Capricious, and Racially Skewed?," editorial in FCNL Washington Newsletter, June 20, 2000.
Chapter 4: Is the Death Penalty Applied Fairly?	6. The Death Penalty Is Not Discriminatory	Dudley Sharp	Reprint of "The Death Penalty in Black and White," June 24, 1999.
Chapter 4: Is the Death Penalty Applied Fairly?	7. The Retarded Should Not Receive the Death Penalty	Rodney Ellis and Joseph Fiorenza	Reprint of "Criminal to Be Executing Mentally Retarded Inmates," Houston Chronicle, May 3, 1999.
Chapter 4: Is the Death Penalty Applied Fairly?	8. The Retarded Should Not Be Exempt From the Death Penalty	Cathleen C. Herasimchuk	Reprint of "Keep Inmates' IQs Out of Death Penalty Decisions," Houston Chronicle, May 21, 1999.
For Further Discussion
Organizations to Contact
Bibliography of Books
Index
