= Money to Burn (performance art) =

2010 work of performance art

Coordinates: 40°42′25″N 74°00′40″W

Money To Burn
- Artist: Dread Scott
- Year: 2010
- Type: Money burning
- Website: www.dreadscott.net/portfolio_page/money-to-burn/

Money to Burn was a work of performance art executed on June 22, 2010, in which Dread Scott burned $171 in US dollar bills in front of the New York Stock Exchange.

Scott filmed himself repeatedly singing "money to bur-rn, money to burn" while burning one bill at a time with a Zippo lighter, both from the $250 in small bills attached to his clothes, and from bills solicited from passers-by.

Describing the performance, Scott said "I did the one thing you shouldn't do with money: burn it. Burning it is the one thing that everyone thinks is just crazy. But I was doing in extremely small form what happens on the stock exchange daily on a much grander scale."

After 25 minutes, the New York Police Department intervened and issued Scott a summons for disorderly conduct, which he fought in court.

== See also ==
- K Foundation Burn a Million Quid
