= Crop destruction =

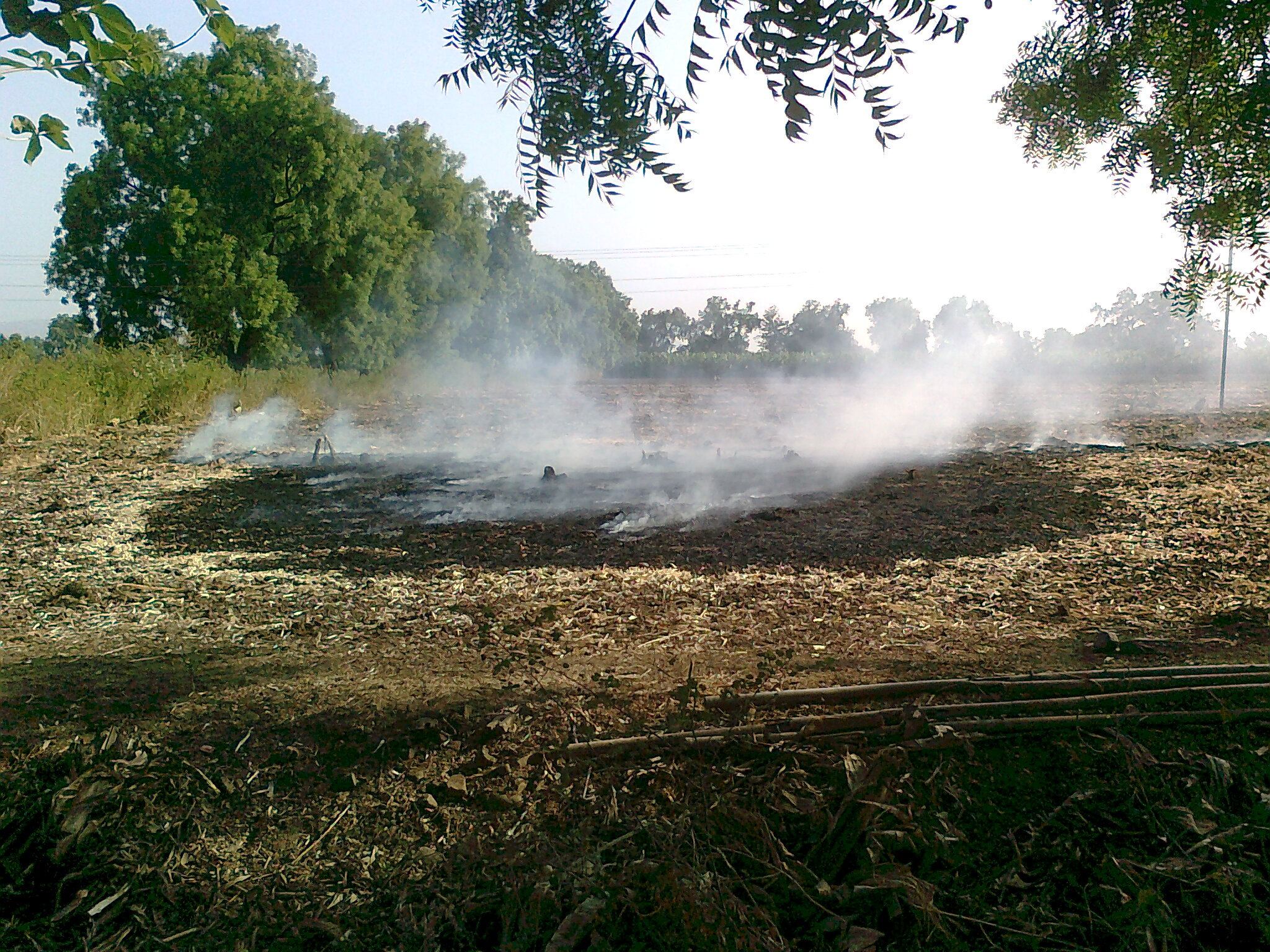
Burning of crop waste

Crop destruction is the deliberate destruction of crops or agricultural products to render it useless for consumption or processing. It can be made by burning, grinding, dumping into water, or application of chemicals. It should not be confused with crop residue burning, which burns non-edible parts of the crop.

Related to crop destruction is alternate, low-price use of agricultural products. A large portion of the European Union wine surplus has been converted to industrial ethanol.

There can be numerous reasons for crop destruction. In a scorched-earth strategy, crops and other useful materials are destroyed to prevent the enemy from gaining hold of them. The strategy of destroying the food supply of the civilian population in an area of conflict has been banned under Article 54 of Protocol I of the 1977 Geneva Conventions, though it continues to be used as a weapon of war.

In government-regulated agriculture, farmers can be required to destroy crops that exceed their production quota. Crops can also be dumped in the street during a public protest; this custom has been common in the European Union. Also, illegal crops, such as opium and cannabis, can be destroyed by law enforcement.

Note that this term does not apply to the burning of crops which are or can be usefully harvested by this means, such as sugar cane.

== In culture ==
The Grapes of Wrath by John Steinbeck dramatizes the irony of destruction of oranges, potatoes, pig carcasses and other agricultural products during the Great Depression juxtaposed with widespread hunger. This crop destruction was implemented by the Agricultural Adjustment Act as an economic measure to benefit farmers, and was harshly criticized, although the book does not mention the cause.

== See also ==
- Agent Orange – Chemical herbicide and defoliant
- Burning money – Deliberate burning of money for effect
- Crop circle – Pattern in a crop field
- Parable of the broken window – Parable by French economist Frédéric Bastiat
- Running through fields of wheat – 2017 quote by Theresa May
- Thinning – Removal of some plants to improve the growth of other plants
- War on Drugs § Aerial herbicide application
