= Susan Brownmiller =

American journalist, author and activist (1935–2025)

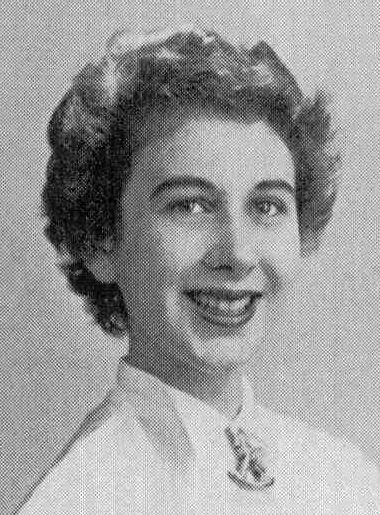
- Brownmiller (née Warhaftig) in 1952
- Born: Susan Warhaftig; February 15, 1935; New York City, U.S.
- Died: May 24, 2025 (aged 90); New York City, U.S.
- Education: Cornell University
- Occupations: Journalist; author; activist
- Notable work: Against Our Will (1975)

Susan Brownmiller (born Susan Warhaftig; February 15, 1935 – May 24, 2025) was an American journalist, author and feminist activist, best known for her 1975 book Against Our Will: Men, Women, and Rape, which was selected by The New York Public Library as one of the 100 most important books of the 20th century.

== Early life and education ==
Susan Brownmiller was born in Brooklyn, New York City, on February 15, 1935, to Mae and Samuel Warhaftig, a lower-middle-class Jewish couple. She was raised in Brooklyn and was the only child of her parents. Her father emigrated from a Polish shtetl and became a salesman in the Garment Center and later a vendor in Macy's department store, and her mother was a secretary in the Empire State Building. She later took the pen name Brownmiller, legally changing her name in 1961.

As a child Brownmiller was sent to the East Midwood Jewish Center for two afternoons a week to learn Hebrew and Jewish history. She would later comment, "It all got sort of mishmashed in my brain except for one thread: a helluva lot of people over the centuries seemed to want to harm Jewish people. ... I can argue that my chosen path – to fight against physical harm, specifically the terror of violence against women – had its origins in what I had learned in Hebrew School about the pogroms and The Holocaust."

She had "a stormy adolescence", attending Cornell University for two years (1952 to 1954) on scholarships, but not graduating. She later studied acting in New York City. She appeared in two off-Broadway productions.

== Activism ==
Brownmiller was a worker in progressive Democrat Mark Lane's successful 1960 campaign for the New York Assembly and his unsuccessful 1962 congressional campaign. They began a relationship which lasted for three years. Brownmiller said of Lane after his death in 2016 that "Mark was a crucial person in my life for a few years. This was before feminism. My ambition was to latch myself to Mark's career and be the Evita of Gracie Mansion".

Brownmiller also participated in civil rights activism, joining CORE and SNCC during the sit-in movement in 1964. Brownmiller volunteered for Freedom Summer in 1964, wherein she worked on voter registration in Meridian, Mississippi. According to her own account:

Jan Goodman and I were in the second batch of volunteers for Mississippi Freedom Summer....When no one else at the Memphis orientation session volunteered for Meridian, Jan and I accepted the assignment. Between us, we had a good ten years of organizing experience, hers in Democratic primaries and presidential campaigns, mine in CORE, the Congress of Racial Equality, and both of us together in voter registration drives in East Harlem. The night we arrived in Meridian, a field secretary called a meeting, asking to see the new volunteers. Proudly we raised our hands. 'Shit!' he exploded. 'I asked for volunteers and they sent me white women.'

She first became involved in the Women's Liberation Movement in New York City in 1968, by participating in a consciousness-raising group in the newly formed New York Radical Women organization, where she stated: "I've had three illegal abortions."

Brownmiller went on to coordinate a sit-in against Ladies' Home Journal in March 1970. As the informal leader of the West Village-1 brigade within the New York Radical Feminists (formed in late 1969), by February 1970 she began to mount a challenge to Shulamith Firestone's leadership, which eventually split the organisation and prompted Firestone's departure in late May/early June 1970.

She began work on her book Against Our Will after a New York Radical Feminists speak-out on rape in 1971, and then spent four years researching and writing in the New York Public Library.

In 1972, Brownmiller signed her name to the Ms. campaign “We Have Had Abortions” which called for an end to "archaic laws" limiting reproductive freedom; they encouraged women to share their stories and take action.

In 1977, Brownmiller became an associate of the Women's Institute for Freedom of the Press (WIFP). WIFP is an American nonprofit publishing organization. The organization works to increase communication between women and connect the public with forms of women-based media. She attended a feminist anti-pornography conference in 1978. She co-founded Women Against Pornography in 1979.

== Career ==
Brownmiller's path into journalism began with an editorial position at a "confession magazine". She went on to work as an assistant to the managing editor at Coronet (1959–60), as an editor of the Albany Report, a weekly review of the New York State legislature (1961–1962), and as a national affairs researcher at Newsweek. In the mid-1960s, Brownmiller continued her career in journalism with positions as a reporter for NBC-TV in Philadelphia, staff writer for The Village Voice, and as a network news writer for ABC-TV in New York City.

Beginning in 1968, she worked as a freelance writer; her book reviews, essays, and articles appeared regularly in publications including The New York Times, Newsday, The New York Daily News, Vogue, and The Nation. In 1968, she signed the "Writers and Editors War Tax Protest" pledge, vowing to refuse tax payments in protest against the Vietnam War.

In New York, she began writing for The Village Voice and became a network TV newswriter at the American Broadcasting Company, a job she held until 1968. In her later years, she continued to write and speak on feminist issues, including a memoir and history of Second Wave radical feminism titled In Our Time: Memoir of a Revolution (1999).

== Against Our Will ==
Against Our Will (1975) is a feminist book in which Brownmiller argues that rape "is nothing more or less than a conscious process of intimidation by which all men keep all women in a state of fear." In order to write the book, after having helped to organize the New York Radical Feminists Speak-Out on Rape on January 24, 1971, and the New York Radical Feminists Conference on Rape on April 17, 1971, she spent four years researching rape. She studied rape throughout history, from the earliest codes of human law up into modern times. She collected clippings to find patterns in the way in which rape is reported in various types of newspapers, analyzed portrayals of rape in literature, films, and popular music, and evaluated crime statistics.

Brownmiller's book received criticism from feminists, including bell hooks and Angela Davis, who wrote that Brownmiller's discussion of rape and race became an "unthinking partisanship which borders on racism".

After the book was published, Brownmiller was named as one of the Time magazine people of the year. In 1995, the New York Public Library selected Against Our Will as one of the 100 most important books of the 20th century.

== Personal life and death ==
Brownmiller described herself as "a single woman", even though "I was always a great believer in romance and partnership." "I would like to be in close association with a man whose work I respect," she told an interviewer in 1976, attributing her unmarried status to the fact that she was "not willing to compromise." She never married.

Brownmiller died from a long illness at a hospital in New York City, on May 24, 2025, at the age of 90. Her papers have been archived at Harvard, in the Arthur and Elizabeth Schlesinger Library on the History of Women in America.

== Books ==
- Shirley Chisholm: A Biography (Doubleday, 1970)
- Against Our Will: Men, Women, and Rape (Simon and Schuster, 1975/Fawcett Columbine 1993)
- Femininity (Linden Press/Simon & Schuster, 1984)
- Waverly Place (Grove Press, 1989)
- Seeing Vietnam: Encounters of the Road and Heart (HarperCollins, 1994)
- In Our Time: Memoir of a Revolution (Dial Press, 1999)
- My City High Rise Garden (Rutgers University Press, 2017)

== Honors ==
Brownmiller won an Alicia Patterson Journalism Fellowship in 1973 to research and write about the crime of rape. She was named as one of 12 Women of the Year by Time magazine in 1975.

She is featured in the feminist history film She's Beautiful When She's Angry (2014).
