= Parasite-stress theory =

Theory of human evolution

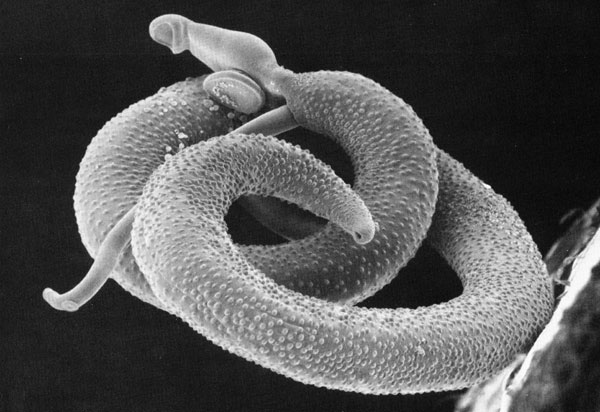
Schistosoma mansoni, an endoparasite that lives in human tissue

Parasite-stress theory, or pathogen-stress theory, is a theory of human evolution proposing that parasites and diseases encountered by a species shape the development of species' values and qualities, proposed by researchers Corey Fincher and Randy Thornhill.

The differences in how parasites and diseases stress people's development is what leads to differences in their biological mate value and mate preferences, as well as differences across culture. Parasites causing diseases pose potential ecological hazards and, subsequently, selection pressures can alter psychological and social behaviours of humans, as well as have an influence on their immune systems.

== Theories of parasite-mediated mate choice ==
Several hypotheses have attempted to explain how parasite load influences female mate choice, as certain traits are thought to be costly and the expression of such traits may be indicative of genetic quality.

=== Hamilton–Zuk hypothesis ===
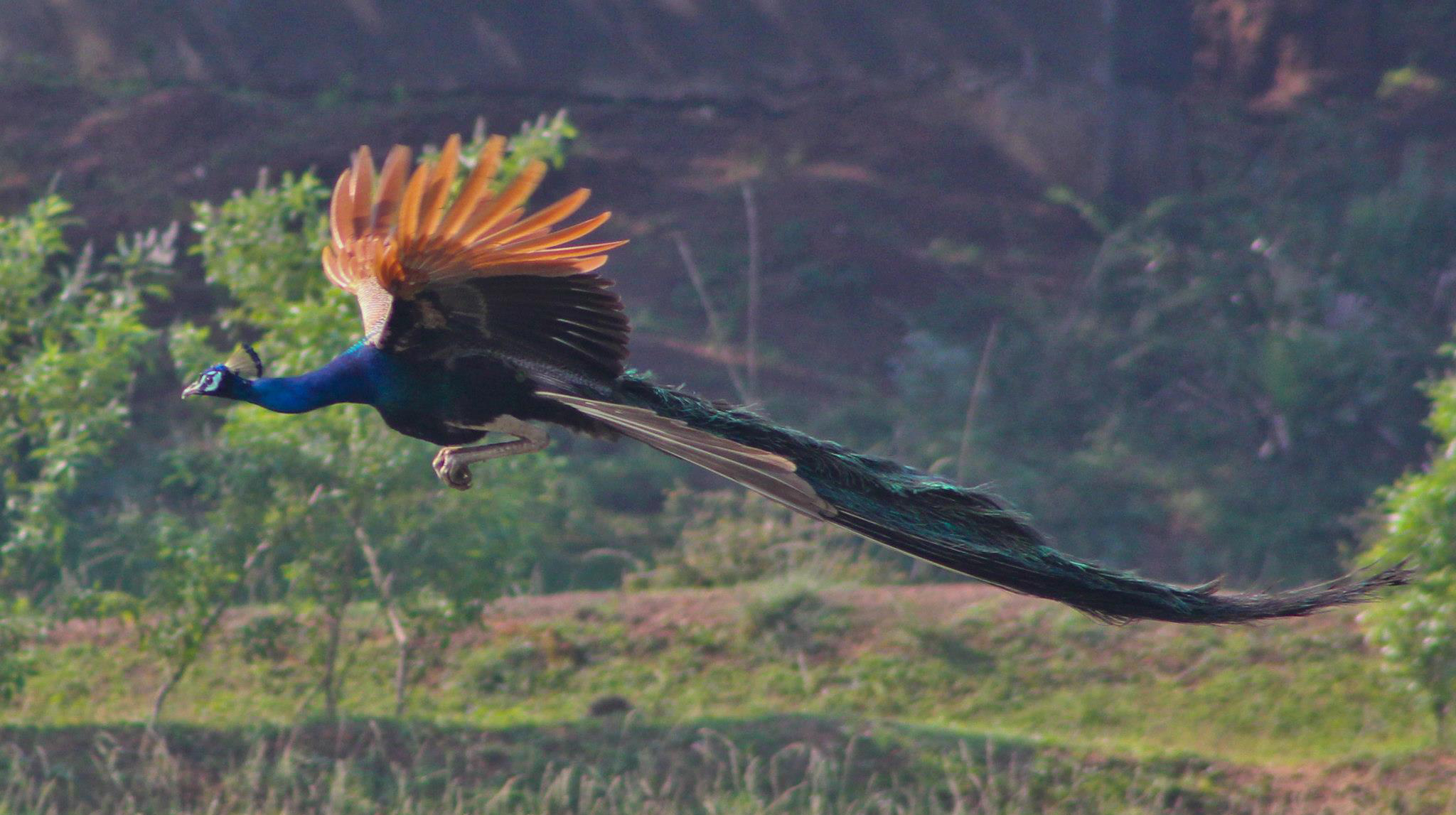
The peacock's large tail could be a cost: the tail requires energy as it weighs the male down during flight.

According to the Hamilton–Zuk hypothesis, female mate choice is based on the extent to which male secondary sexual characteristics are expressed, as these are thought to be indicative of a heritable resistance to pathogens. A meta-analysis reviewed studies exploring the magnitude of the relationship between expression of secondary sexual characteristics and parasite intensity, as well as level of host immune functioning. Consistent with the hypothesis proposed by Hamilton and Zuk, the meta-analysis revealed that males with the fewest parasites and/or the strongest immune systems typically had the most extravagant secondary sexual characteristics. With regards to parasite-stress theory, these findings would be interpreted as those men who have encountered more parasites – or are naturally less capable of dealing with parasites – are also less desirable mates to females, due to a lower genetic quality for the potential offspring.

=== Immunocompetence handicap hypothesis ===
This hypothesis extends Zahavi's handicap principle in suggesting that testosterone is responsible for the production of male secondary sexual traits while also suppressing the immune system. It therefore proposes that these traits are honest signals of mate quality because only males with 'good genes' should be able to fully express them without being vulnerable to parasite attack. Males will, therefore, demonstrate their high genetic quality by developing more attractive honest signals in substitute for their immune system's strength. These honest signals require testosterone, which simultaneously suppresses the immune system.

A meta-analysis revealed that evidence for a direct effect of testosterone on the expression of sexual traits and the suppression of immunocompetence was weak. It was found, however, that increased testosterone influenced parasite loads, indicating an indirect role of the hormone in immune function.

== Parasite-mediated domestication ==
According to the parasite-mediated domestication hypothesis, proposed by Skok in 2023, parasites (specifically endoparasites: helminths and protozoa) could play an important mediating role in the process of domestication, with a 'parasite effect' primarily involved in the emergence of the domesticated state (proto-domestication). The hypothesis states that parasites indirectly influence literally all of the main processes that otherwise underlie the domestication syndrome (abnormalities in the functioning of the neuro-neuroendocrine system, a developmental disruption of neural crest cell input to the affected phenotypic traits, etc.). The hypothesis predicts that the frequency of domestication syndrome traits such as tameness, depigmentation and mottling, floppy ears, short and curled tail, and reduced size of the adrenal glands from the wild population increases with decreasing genetic resistance to parasites and with increasing parasite load. The hypothesis further suggests that the features of the domestication syndrome may be genetically linked to genes related to resistance or tolerance to parasites, the role of miRNA in the process of epigenetic inheritance or the transgenerational inheritance of stress pathology.

== Interactions with developmental instability ==
Developmental instability is the inability of an organism to produce its optimal phenotype, due to genetic limitations and environmental stresses (such as parasite load).

=== Fluctuating asymmetry ===
Fluctuating asymmetry is the extent to which an organism deviates from perfect body symmetry. Asymmetry, an indicator of development, is exhibited by all organisms and is thus considered by scientists to be a reliable measure of developmental instability.

Research in a Dominican village, which measured the prevalence of protozoa and worm parasites in over 300 children, found a positive correlation between gut parasites and fluctuating asymmetry. This finding is indicative of how parasites negatively impact peoples' development and act as environmental stress factors.

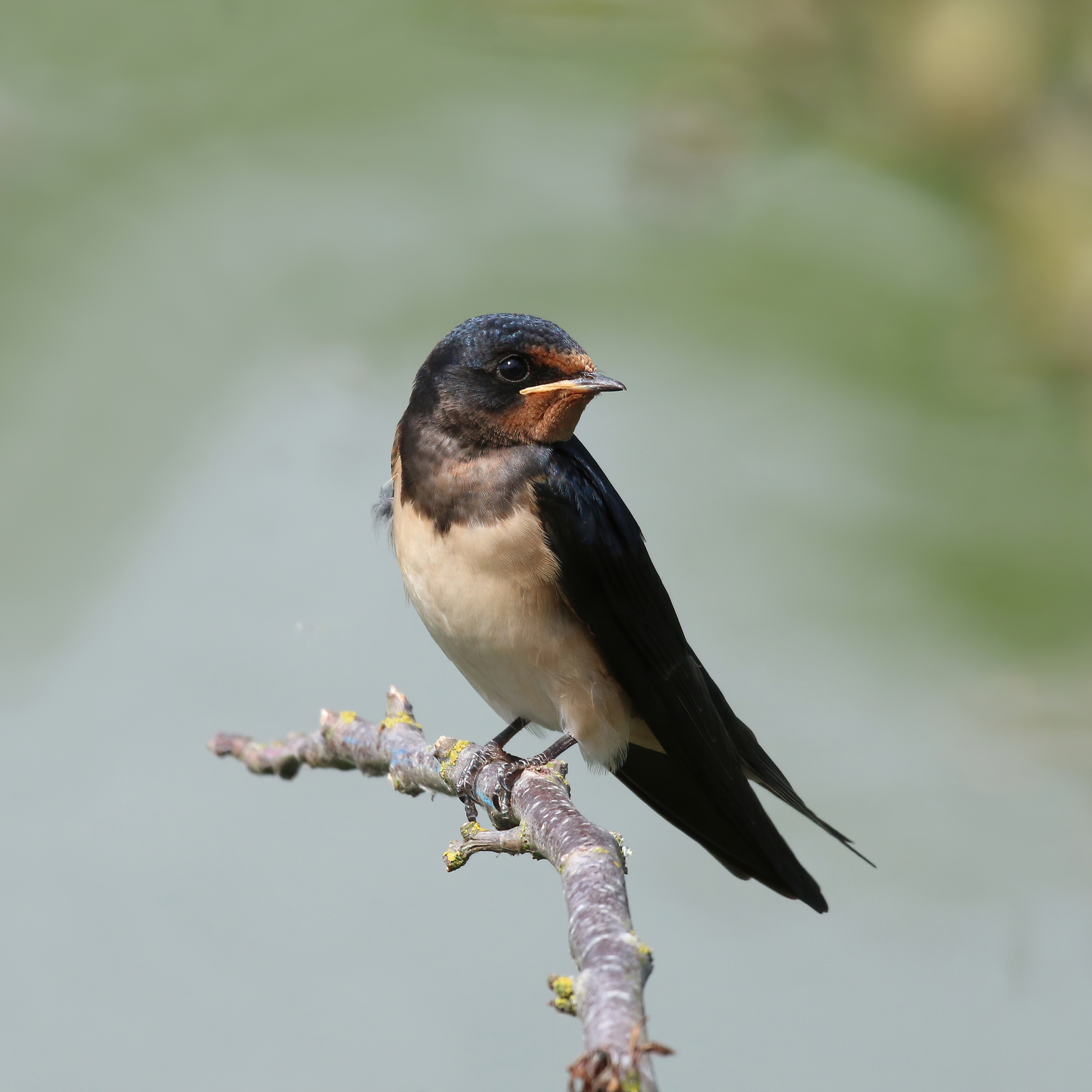
A barn swallow

A literature review summarising more than 100 different studies in the field found that, among other variables, immunocompetence (the ability of an organism to produce a normal immune response to an antigen) had a significant relationship with fluctuating asymmetry. In other words, individuals who had a better ability to defend themselves against threats, such as parasites, were also lower in fluctuating asymmetry.

=== Waist-hip ratio ===
A woman's waist-hip ratio is an indicator of her age, health and fertility, as well as being a good indicator of other people's judgements of attractiveness, with a lower waist-hip ratio being optimal.

Higher waist-hip ratio has been linked with mobility disability and cardiovascular disease. Also, within parasite-stress theory itself, women with higher waist-hip ratio's also had a higher incidence of toxoplasmosis, another incidence in which parasitism contributes to developmental instability.

=== Mate choice ===
Mate choosers prefer mates who are lower in developmental instability, meaning that they choose those who display lower fluctuating asymmetry.

In barn swallows, the length of the male's tail is used as a signal of mate quality: males with longer tails are preferred to those with shorter tails. Research has found that, in a population of barn swallows infested by the parasite Ornithonyssus bursa, male barn swallows with fewer mites also had longer tails.

== Variations across cultures ==
When discussing cross-cultural differences between societies, scientists will more often than not make a distinction between individualism and collectivism.

=== Collectivist ===
Research has suggested that collectivism exists to defend against infectious diseases. Therefore, cultures that have a higher rate of infections will be more likely to become collectivist. This has been based on a number of observations. Firstly, collectivists place a lot of emphasis on their in-group, caring for one another and hence protecting each other from the negative effects of contagion. This is likely due to the fact that one's immune system works to defend the body from local parasites; however, this still allows for the risk of unfamiliar infections resulting in illness as the immune system has not been able to evolve in response to these novel parasites. Hence, ensuring that those in the in-group are not affected by a novel disease will subsequently result in a reduced risk of encountering a novel parasite from an exposed person an individual remains in close proximity with.

Secondly, collectivist cultures are untrusting of those outside of their in-group, which may serve as a protective behaviour against interactions with those in groups that may harbour novel diseases. In similar vein to the explanation presented with one's protective nature of their in-group members, one's immune system is well adapted to local parasites and will be unable to effectively protect against unfamiliar pathogens. Therefore, avoidance of those outside of one's inner circle will aid in the prevention of being exposed to novel and dangerous pathogens that the immune system is unable to defend against.

Thirdly, it has been observed that collectivist groups exhibit strong negative attitudes when an individual goes against their social norms. A relevant example is deviating from the way that food is prepared, which could result in a higher possibility of exposure to new and threatening pathogens. Hence, this strong social norm, is effectively in place to prevent group members from being negligent and becoming ill with a novel parasite – which then could pass onto other members of the group.

=== Individualist ===
Individualist societies, however, are very different to collectivist through their promotion of looking out for oneself, rather than worrying about the needs of the group. This is partly due to these cultures being predominantly in geographical locations which are under a lot less danger from parasite invasions. Unlike collectivists, individualists make much less of a distinction between in-groups and out-groups. A clear distinction, that individualism shows from collectivism, comes from the active encouragement individualist cultures place upon individuals straying from the current social norms.

=== Criticism ===
Some authors have pointed out that parasite stress is a misleading term because the described phenomenon includes viruses. A virus does not fit the definition of a parasite because a parasite is defined as an organism, and a virus is not an organism. Some authors use the name pathogen-stress theory instead.

Several scientists have criticized the theory that pathogen stress can explain differences in collectivism versus individualism, suggesting that the observed correlations were spurious. Anthropologist Daniel Hruschka and human biologist Joseph Henrich have proposed an alternative explanation of the observed cultural differences. In colonial times, European colonizers established efficient social institutions in countries with low mortality. In places where mortality was high due to infectious diseases, they set up extractive systems with less settling of Europeans. The more-efficient government institutions inherited from colonial times in low mortality countries can explain the observed differences in cultural values.

=== Parasite influence on food preference across cultures ===
This difference in culture due to pathogen avoidance has also been seen in the contrast of food preferences between cultures. Research investigated the possibility that individuals will have a preference for spices in their cooking to defend against food-borne human parasites. This was tested through measuring the types and numbers of spices used in recipes across various regions across the world – it was found that temperature was a good predictor of the use of anti-pathogen spices. This finding makes sense when considering that temperature is a breeding ground for parasites.

== See also ==
- Life history theory
