= Euthanasia: Opposing Viewpoints =

Book about issues regarding euthanasia

- Editor: James D. Torr
- Subject: Euthanasia
- Publisher: Greenhaven Press
- Publication date: 1 September 2000
- Media type: Print
- Pages: 208
- ISBN: 0-7377-0127-7
- Dewey Decimal: 179.7 21
- LC Class: R726 .E7924 2000

Euthanasia: Opposing Viewpoints is a book in the Opposing Viewpoints series, published by Greenhaven Press. A year 2000 edition was edited by James D. Torr, while the previous 1989 and 1995 editions were edited by Neal Bernard and Carol Wekesser respectively.

== Contents ==
It presents selections of contrasting points of view on four central questions about euthanasia: whether it is ethical; whether it should be legalized; whether legalizing it would lead to involuntary killing; and whether physicians should assist in suicide.
