= Opposing Viewpoints series =

Opposing Viewpoints is a series of books on current issues which seeks to explore the varying opinions in a balanced pros/cons debate. The series attempts to encourage critical thinking and issue awareness by providing opposing views on contentious issues. The online versions are managed by Cengage Gale and the print versions are available through Rosen publishing.

Each book features black and white illustrations and cartoons, bibliographies, glossaries, chronologies, indexes, activities, and discussion questions. They are published by Greenhaven Press and are heavily used in both school and public library collections.

A review of the online database, Opposing Viewpoints Resource Center, reads, "The print series has long been a staple in secondary school and young adult collections for research and debate preparation on hot topics in social studies and science."

Christine Nasso of Greenhaven Press told Booklist, "When we learned our customers wanted series content to be made available in a fully searchable database, we responded with the Opposing Viewpoints Resource Center".

In 2017, Gale offered a Chrome extension to help students identify its Opposing Viewpoints in Context results in Google searches.

== Books in the series ==
- Abortion: Opposing Viewpoints (2002) edited by Mary E. Williams (ISBN 0-7377-0777-1, ISBN 0-7377-0778-X)
- Addiction: Opposing Viewpoints (2005) edited by Louise I. Gerdes (ISBN 0-7377-2216-9, ISBN 0-7377-2217-7)
- Adoption: Opposing Viewpoints (2002) edited by Roman Espejo (ISBN 0-7377-0789-5, ISBN 0-7377-0790-9)
- Africa: Opposing Viewpoints (2005) edited by Laura K. Egendorf (ISBN 0-7377-2218-5, ISBN 0-7377-2219-3)
- An Aging Population: Opposing Viewpoints (2002) edited by Laura K. Egendorf (ISBN 0-7377-0782-8, ISBN 0-7377-0781-X)
- AIDS: Opposing Viewpoints (2003) edited by Tamara L. Roleff (ISBN 0-7377-1136-1, ISBN 0-7377-1135-3)
- Alcohol: Opposing Viewpoints (2004) edited by Karen Balkin (ISBN 0-7377-1216-3, ISBN 0-7377-1215-5)
- America’s Youth: Opposing Viewpoints (2003) edited by Roman Espejo (ISBN 0-7377-1218-X, ISBN 0-7377-1217-1)
- Animal Experimentation: Opposing Viewpoints (2002) edited by Helen Cothran (ISBN 0-7377-0902-2, ISBN 0-7377-0903-0)
- Animal Rights: Opposing Viewpoints (1989) edited by Andrew Harnack (ISBN 9781565103993)
- Atheism: Opposing Viewpoints (2009) edited by Beth Rosenthal (ISBN 9780737741933)
- Biological Warfare: Opposing Viewpoints (2004) edited by William Dudley (ISBN 0-7377-1671-1, ISBN 0-7377-1672-X)
- Biomedical Ethics: Opposing Viewpoints (2003) edited by Roman Espejo (ISBN 0-7377-1220-1, ISBN 0-7377-1219-8)
- The Breakup of the Soviet Union: Opposing Viewpoints (1994) edited by William Barbour (ISBN 1-5651-0067-0)
- Censorship: Opposing Viewpoints (2002) edited by Tamara L Roleff (ISBN 1-56510-957-0, ISBN 1-56510-956-2)
- Chemical Dependency: Opposing Viewpoints (2003) edited by Laura K. Egendorf (ISBN 0-7377-1221-X, ISBN 0-7377-1222-8)
- Child Abuse: Opposing Viewpoints (2004) edited by Louise I. Gerdes (ISBN 0-7377-1674-6, ISBN 0-7377-1673-8)
- Constructing a Life Philosophy: Opposing Viewpoints (2002) (ISBN 0-7377-1263-5)
- Civil Liberties: Opposing Viewpoints (2004) edited by Auriana Ojeda (ISBN 0-7377-1675-4, ISBN 0-7377-1676-2)
- The Creation of the Constitution: Opposing Viewpoints (1995) edited by William Dudley (ISBN 1565102215)
- Crime and Criminals: Opposing Viewpoints (2005) edited by James D. Torr (ISBN 0-7377-2222-3, ISBN 0-7377-2223-1)
- Criminal Justice: Opposing Viewpoints (2004) edited by Tamara L. Roleff (ISBN 0-7377-1678-9, ISBN 0-7377-1677-0)
- Culture Wars: Opposing Viewpoints (2004) edited by Mary E. Williams (ISBN 0-7377-1679-7, ISBN 0-7377-1680-0)
- Death and Dying: Opposing Viewpoints (2003) edited by James Haley (ISBN 0-7377-1224-4, ISBN 0-7377-1223-6)
- The Death Penalty: Opposing Viewpoints (2002) edited by Mary E Williams (ISBN 0-7377-0792-5, ISBN 0-7377-0791-7)
- Discrimination: Opposing Viewpoints (2003) edited by Mary E. Williams (ISBN 0-7377-1225-2, ISBN 0-7377-1226-0)
- Domestic Violence: Opposing Viewpoints (2005) edited by David M. Haugen (ISBN 0-7377-2224-X, ISBN 0-7377-2225-8)
- Drug Abuse: Opposing Viewpoints (2005) edited by Tamara L. Roleff (ISBN 0-7377-2226-6, ISBN 0-7377-2227-4)
- Education: Opposing Viewpoints (2005) edited by Mary E. Williams (ISBN 0-7377-2228-2, ISBN 0-7377-2229-0)
- Endangered Oceans: Opposing Viewpoints (2004) edited by Louise I. Gerdes (ISBN 0-7377-2275-4, ISBN 0-7377-2274-6)
- Energy Alternatives: Opposing Viewpoints (2002) edited by Helen Cothran (ISBN 0-7377-0904-9, ISBN 0-7377-0905-7)
- Energy Alternatives: Opposing Viewpoints (2006) edited by Barbara Passero (ISBN 978-0-7377-3351-8)
- Ethics: Opposing Viewpoints (2011) edited by Roman Espejo (ISBN 978-0-73774-767-6)
- Euthanasia: Opposing Viewpoints (2000) edited by James D. Torr (ISBN 0-7377-0127-7)
- The Environment: Opposing Viewpoints (2005) edited by Laura K. Egendorf (ISBN 0-7377-2230-4, ISBN 0-7377-2231-2)
- Extremist Groups: Opposing Viewpoints (2001) edited by Tamara L. Roleff (ISBN 0-7377-0656-2, ISBN 0-7377-0655-4)
- Extremist Groups : Opposing Viewpoints (2005) edited by Karen Balkin (ISBN 0-7377-2232-0, ISBN 0-7377-2233-9)
- The Family: Opposing Viewpoints (2003) edited by Auriana Ojeda (ISBN 0-7377-1228-7, ISBN 0-7377-1227-9)
- Gambling: Opposing Viewpoints (2002) edited by James D. Torr (ISBN 0-7377-0906-5, ISBN 0-7377-0907-3)
- Gangs: Opposing Viewpoints (2005) edited by William Dudley and Louise I. Gerdes (ISBN 0-7377-2234-7, ISBN 0-7377-2235-5)
- Garbage and Recycling: Opposing Viewpoints (2003) edited by Helen Cothran (ISBN 0-7377-1229-5, ISBN 0-7377-1230-9), (2007) edited by Mitchell Young
- Genetic Engineering: Opposing Viewpoints (2005) edited by Louise I. Gerdes (ISBN 0-7377-2236-3, ISBN 0-7377-2237-1)
- Global Resources: Opposing Viewpoints (2004) edited by Helen Cothran (ISBN 0-7377-1681-9, ISBN 0-7377-1682-7)
- Global Warming: Opposing Viewpoints (2002) edited by James Haley (ISBN 0-7377-0909-X, ISBN 0-7377-0908-1)
- Gun Control: Opposing Viewpoints (2003) edited by Helen Cothran (ISBN 0-7377-0747-X, ISBN 0-7377-0746-1)
- Hate Groups: Opposing Viewpoints (1999) edited by Tamara L. Roleff (ISBN 1-56510-943-0, ISBN 1-56510-942-2)
- Hate Groups: Opposing Viewpoints (2004) edited by Mary E. Williams (ISBN 0-7377-2280-0, ISBN 0-7377-2281-9)
- Health: Opposing Viewpoints (2004) edited by Auriana Ojeda (ISBN 0-7377-1683-5, ISBN 0-7377-1684-3)
- Health Care: Opposing Viewpoints (2000) edited by James D. Torr (ISBN 0-7377-0128-5, ISBN 0-7377-0129-3)
- Health Care: Opposing Viewpoints (2004) edited by Karen Balkin (ISBN 0-7377-1685-1, ISBN 0-7377-1686-X)
- The Homeless: Opposing Viewpoints (2002) edited by Jennifer A. Hurley (ISBN 0-7377-0749-6, ISBN 0-7377-0750-X)
- Homosexuality: Opposing Viewpoints (1993) edited by William Dudley (ISBN 0-89908-456-7, ISBN 0-89908-481-8)
- Homosexuality: Opposing Viewpoints (1999) edited by Mary E. Williams (ISBN 0-7377-0053-X, ISBN 0-7377-0052-1)
- Homosexuality: Opposing Viewpoints (2004) edited by Auriana Ojeda (ISBN 0-7377-1687-8, ISBN 0-7377-1688-6)
- Human Rights: Opposing Viewpoints (2004) edited by Laura K. Egendorf (ISBN 0-7377-1690-8, ISBN 0-7377-1689-4)
- Immigration: Opposing Viewpoints (2004) edited by Mary E. Williams (ISBN 0-7377-1691-6, ISBN 0-7377-1692-4)
- India and Pakistan: Opposing Viewpoints (2003) edited by William Dudley (ISBN 0-7377-1762-9, ISBN 0-7377-1763-7)
- The Information Revolution: Opposing Viewpoints (2004) edited by Laura K. Egendorf (ISBN 0-7377-1694-0, ISBN 0-7377-1693-2)
- Cothran, Helen, ed. (2002). The Internet: Opposing Viewpoints. ISBN 0-7377-0779-8.
- Interracial America: Opposing Viewpoints (2001) (ISBN 0-7377-0657-0)
- Iraq: Opposing Viewpoints (2004) edited by William Dudley (ISBN 0-7377-2286-X, ISBN 0-7377-2287-8)
- Islam: Opposing Viewpoints (2005) edited by William Dudley (ISBN 0-7377-0514-0, ISBN 0-7377-0513-2, ISBN 0-7377-2238-X, ISBN 0-7377-2239-8)
- Israel: Opposing Viewpoints (2005) edited by John Woodward (ISBN 0-7377-2589-3, ISBN 0-7377-2590-7)
- Japan: Opposing Viewpoints (1989) edited by William Dudley (ISBN 0-89908-444-3, ISBN 0-89908-419-2)
- Juvenile Crime: Opposing Viewpoints (2002) edited by Auriana Ojeda (ISBN 0-7377-0784-4, ISBN 0-7377-0783-6)
- Legal System: Opposing Viewpoints (2003) (ISBN 0-7377-1231-7)
- Male/Female Roles: Opposing Viewpoints (2005) edited by Auriana Ojeda (ISBN 0-7377-2240-1, ISBN 0-7377-2241-X)
- Mass Media: Opposing Viewpoints (2005) edited by William Dudley (ISBN 0-7377-2242-8, ISBN 0-7377-2243-6)
- Media Violence: Opposing Viewpoints (2004) edited by Louise I. Gerdes (ISBN 0-7377-2011-5, ISBN 0-7377-2012-3)
- Medicine: Opposing Viewpoints (2003) edited by Laura K. Egendorf (ISBN 0-7377-1234-1, ISBN 0-7377-1233-3)
- The Middle East: Opposing Viewpoints (2004) edited by William Dudley (ISBN 0-7377-1806-4, ISBN 0-7377-1805-6)
- National Security: Opposing Viewpoints (2003) (ISBN 978-0-7377-1695-5)
- The New World Order: Opposing Viewpoints (1991) edited by Matthew Polesetsky (ISBN 0-89908-183-5, ISBN 0-89908-158-4)
- North and South Korea: Opposing Viewpoints (2003) edited by William Dudley (ISBN 0-7377-1236-8, ISBN 0-7377-1235-X)
- Opposing Viewpoints in American History, Volume I (ISBN 1-5651-0347-5)
- Opposing Viewpoints in American History, Volume II (ISBN 1-5651-0349-1)
- Paranormal Phenomena: Opposing Viewpoints (2003) edited by Mary E. Williams (ISBN 0-7377-1238-4, ISBN 0-7377-1237-6)
- The Political Spectrum: Opposing Viewpoints (1981) edited by David L. Bender and Bruno Leone (ISBN 0-89908-300-5), ISBN 0-89908-325-0)
- Pornography: Opposing Viewpoints (2002) edited by James D. Torr (ISBN 0-7377-0761-5, ISBN 0-7377-0760-7)
- Pornography: Opposing Viewpoints (1997) Edited by Carol Wekesser (ISBN 1-56510-517-6, ISBN 978-1-56510-518-8)
- Race Relations: Opposing Viewpoints (2005) edited by James D. Torr (ISBN 0-7377-2955-4, ISBN 0-7377-2956-2)
- Religion in America: Opposing Viewpoints (2001) (ISBN 1-5651-0002-6)
- Sexual Violence: Opposing Viewpoints (2003) edited by Helen Cothran (ISBN 0-7377-1240-6, ISBN 0-7377-1239-2)
- Science and Religion: Opposing Viewpoints (1988) edited by Janelle Rohr (ISBN 0-89908-406-0)
- Students' Rights: Opposing Viewpoints (2005) edited by Jamuna Carroll (ISBN 0-7377-3089-7)
- The Soviet Union: Opposing Viewpoints (1987) edited by Neal Bernards (ISBN 0-8990-8404-4)
- Sports and Athletes: Opposing Viewpoints (2005) edited by James D. Torr (ISBN 0-7377-2244-4, ISBN 0-7377-2245-2)
- Suicide: Opposing Viewpoints (2003) edited by Roman Espejo (ISBN 0-7377-1242-2, ISBN 0-7377-1241-4)
- Technology and Society: Opposing Viewpoints (2002) edited by Auriana Ojeda (ISBN 0-7377-0912-X, ISBN 0-7377-0913-8
- Teen Dating: Opposing Viewpoints (2013) edited by Louise I. Gerdes (ISBN 978-0-7377-6344-7, ISBN 978-0-7377-6345-4)
- Teenage Pregnancy: Opposing Viewpoints (2003) edited by Auriana Ojeda (ISBN 0-7377-1243-0, ISBN 0-7377-1244-9)
- Teens at Risk: Opposing Viewpoints (2004) edited by Auriana Ojeda (ISBN 0-7377-1915-X, ISBN 0-7377-1916-8)
- Terrorism: Opposing Viewpoints (2000) edited by Laura K. Egendorf. (ISBN 0-7377-0137-4)
- Terrorism: Opposing Viewpoints (2004) edited by Laura K. Egendorf (ISBN 0-7377-2247-9, ISBN 0-7377-2246-0)
- Third World: Opposing Viewpoints (2000) (ISBN 0-7377-0353-9)
- Tobacco and Smoking: Opposing Viewpoints (2005) edited by Karen Balkin (ISBN 0-7377-2248-7, ISBN 0-7377-2249-5)
- Violence: Opposing Viewpoints (2002) edited by Laura K. Egendorf (ISBN 0-7377-0660-0, ISBN 0-7377-0659-7)
- War: Opposing Viewpoints (2005) edited by Louise I. Gerdes (ISBN 0-7377-2591-5, ISBN 0-7377-2592-3)
- The War on Drugs: Opposing Viewpoints (2004) edited by Tamara L. Roleff (ISBN 0-7377-2285-1, ISBN 0-7377-2284-3)
- The War on Terrorism: Opposing Viewpoints (2005) edited by Karen Balkin (ISBN 0-7377-2336-X, ISBN 0-7377-2337-8)
- World War I: Opposing Viewpoints (1998) edited by William Dudley (ISBN 1-56510-702-0, ISBN 1-56510-703-9)
- Weapons of Mass Destruction: Opposing Viewpoints (2005) edited by James D. Torr (ISBN 0-7377-2250-9, ISBN 0-7377-2251-7)
- Welfare: Opposing Viewpoints (2003) edited by James Haley (ISBN 0-7377-1246-5, ISBN 0-7377-1245-7)
- Illegal Immigration: Opposing Viewpoints (2006) edited by Margaret Haerens (ISBN 0-7377-3357-8)
