= A Natural History of Rape =

2000 book by Randy Thornhill and Craig T. Palmer

A Natural History of Rape: Biological Bases of Sexual Coercion
- Cover of the first edition
- Authors: Randy Thornhill; Craig T. Palmer
- Language: English
- Subject: Rape
- Publisher: MIT Press
- Publication date: 2000
- Publication place: United States
- Media type: Print (Hardcover and Paperback)
- Pages: 251
- ISBN: 0-262-20125-9

A Natural History of Rape: Biological Bases of Sexual Coercion is a 2000 book by biologist Randy Thornhill and anthropologist Craig T. Palmer.

== See also ==
- Sexual coercion
- Sexual Violence: Opposing Viewpoints
- Sociobiological theories of rape
