= The Armchair Economist =

Book by Steven Landsburg

The Armchair Economist: Economics and Everyday Life
- Author: Steven Landsburg
- Language: English
- Subject: Economics
- Publisher: The Free Press
- Publication date: 27 September 1993 (1st edition); 1 May 2012 (revised edition)
- Publication place: United States
- Media type: Print (Hardback, Paperback)
- Pages: 241(1993), 336(2012)
- ISBN: 978-0-02-917776-1
- OCLC: 32900184

The Armchair Economist: Economics and Everyday Life is an economics book written by Rochester professor of economics Steven Landsburg. The first edition appeared in 1993. A revised and updated edition appeared in May 2012. The underlying theme of the book, as Landsburg states on the first page, is that "[m]ost of economics can be summarized in four words: People respond to incentives." With this apparently innocuous observation, Landsburg discusses some unexpected effects of various policies such as automobile safety legislation and environmental policies. The rest of the book includes expositions on a wide range of topics, including budget deficit, unemployment, economic growth, and cost–benefit analysis.

Chapter 4 covers the "Indifference Principle".

Chapter 9 covers the Coase Theorem of professor Ronald Coase.

The book is also recommended reading by the departments of economics at several universities.

== Background ==
Landsburg received a Master of Arts degree from the University of Rochester in 1974, along with a Doctor of Philosophy degree from the University of Chicago. The now Rochester Professor of Economics released his first book, Price Theory and Applications in 1989 and followed it up in 1993 with the first edition of The Armchair Economist. Since then he has written for many different publications such as Slate, The Wall Street Journal as well as releasing numerous other books surrounding the topic of Economics.

In 2012 Landsburg released a "revised and updated" version of the original work, aiming to present the same ideas within a 21 century context. He achieved this by rewriting some chapters while also adding over 80 pages bringing the book into the contemporary age.

== See also ==
- Freakonomics
- The Undercover Economist
