= Randy Thornhill =

American entomologist and evolutionary biologist (born 1944)

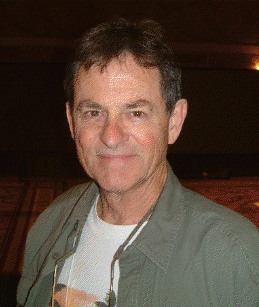
- Born: Albert Randolph Thornhill; December 7, 1944 (age 81); Decatur, Alabama, United States
- Education: Auburn University; University of Michigan
- Known for: A Natural History of Rape; The Evolution of Insect Mating Systems
- Spouses: Nancy Thornhill (divorced); Joy Thornhill (divorced)
- Children: Sophie Thornhill; Reed Thornhill; Aubri Thornhill; Margo Thornhill; Patrick Thornhill
- Awards: Humboldt Prize (1989)
- Scientific career
- Fields: Evolutionary psychology; entomology
- Thesis: Evolutionary Ecology of the Mecoptera (Insecta) (1974)
- Website: biology.unm.edu/people/faculty/profile/thornhill_randy.html

Randy Thornhill (born 1944) is an American entomologist and evolutionary biologist. He is a professor of biology at the University of New Mexico, and was president of the Human Behavior and Evolution Society from 2011 to 2013. He is known for his evolutionary explanation of rape as well as his work on insect mating systems and the parasite-stress theory.

== Life ==
Thornhill was born in Alabama in 1944. When he was 12, his mother introduced him to Charles Darwin's The Descent of Man, and Selection in Relation to Sex, which encouraged his later interest in human evolution.

He received a BS in Zoology from Auburn University in 1968, an MS in entomology from Auburn University in 1970, and a PhD in Zoology from the University of Michigan in 1974. His doctoral thesis discussed the evolutionary ecology of Mecoptera insects. He was formerly married to fellow researcher Nancy Thornhill.

== Work ==
Thornhill's interests lie in the evolution and ecology of animal social psychology and behavior, as well as human behavioral ecology and evolutionary psychology. In 1983, Thornhill published The Evolution of Insect Mating Systems, a book that journalist Ethan Watters described as "groundbreaking". He considers this his most important work. As of 2014, he has published four books and over 150 papers, which have been cited more than 17,000 times. His work has been featured in many newspapers, magazines, television shows and radio programs, including an interview on The Today Show.

Together with anthropologist Craig T. Palmer, Thornhill authored A Natural History of Rape in 2000. Thornhill and Palmer proposed that rape should be understood through evolutionary psychology, and criticized the argument that rape is not sexually motivated. They argue that the capacity for rape is either an adaptation or a byproduct of adaptive traits such as sexual desire and aggressiveness. The work provoked a major controversy. Thornhill received several death threats, and was assigned a campus police officer to escort him to and from class. A compendium of academic criticism was published, to which Thornhill responded.

Since 2005, Thornhill has proposed that many human values evolved to protect against pathogens. He believes that morality, political systems and religion are all influenced by regional variations in pathogen levels. In particular, Thornhill and colleagues have suggested that collectivism and xenophobia serve to ward off infectious disease. In support of this, they reported that collectivist cultures had a higher prevalence of pathogens than individualist ones. Thornhill has also suggested that pathogen defense could help explain civil and ethnic warfare, homicide, patriarchal family structures, and social suppression of female sexuality.

In 2021, Thornhill appeared as a guest on episode 38 of season 4 of the Jordan B. Peterson Podcast entitled: Death, Disease, and Politics. There, he discussed his research and views with the host (Peterson) about a range of topics, including attractiveness, Thornhill's parasite-stress theory, and the “critical role that infectious disease plays in humanity, IQ, sex, religion, and conservatism”.
