= Neil Gilbert =

American social policy scholar

- Born: September 18, 1940 (age 86); Brooklyn, New York, U.S.
- Known for: Four-dimensional framework for social welfare policy analysis; the "enabling state"
- Awards: Doctor honoris causa, UNED (2026); Fellow, American Academy of Social Work and Social Welfare (2014)

Academic background
- Education: Brooklyn College (BA, 1963); University of Pittsburgh (MSW, 1965; PhD, 1968)

Academic work
- Discipline: Social welfare
- Sub-discipline: Social policy
- Institutions: University of California, Berkeley
- Main interests: Social welfare policy, comparative welfare states, family policy, child welfare
- Notable works: Capitalism and the Welfare State (1983); A Mother's Work (2008); Never Enough (2017)

Neil Gilbert (born September 18, 1940) is an American social policy scholar and author. He is a Distinguished Professor and the Milton and Gertrude Chernin Professor of Social Welfare and Social Services at the School of Social Welfare, University of California, Berkeley. His work centers on social welfare policy, comparative welfare states, family policy, and child welfare, and he is known for a four-dimensional framework for analyzing social welfare policy and for his account of the shift from the welfare state to what he calls the "enabling state".

Gilbert is the author of 15 books, 20 edited volumes, and more than 145 articles. Beyond his welfare-state scholarship, he is most known for challenging progressive assumptions about poverty and inequality. He is the founder of the Family Welfare Research Group at Berkeley and directs its Center for Comparative Welfare State Research. He is a fellow of the American Academy of Social Work and Social Welfare and a recipient of an honorary doctorate from the Universidad Nacional de Educación a Distancia in Madrid.

== Education and career ==
Gilbert was associated for three years with the research and planning for the Mayor's Committee on Human Resources, Pittsburgh's Community Action Agency. At the University of California, Berkeley, he served as the School of Social Welfare's acting dean from 1994 to 1996 and as chair of the doctoral program for a five-year period. His university service included posts as vice-chair and chair of the Berkeley Senate Faculty's Graduate Council.

Gilbert is a Distinguished Professor and the Milton and Gertrude Chernin Professor of Social Welfare and Social Services. He directs the Center for Comparative Welfare State Research and founded the Family Welfare Research Group. He held three Fulbright awards, two in London and one in Israel.

== Research and work ==
Gilbert's publications include 15 books, 20 edited volumes, and more than 145 articles, several of them translated into Chinese, Japanese, Korean, and Italian.

=== Clients or Constituents (1970) ===
Clients or Constituents: Community Action in the War on Poverty was published in 1970. It was a study of the community action programs of the War on Poverty. The book drew on his research with the Pittsburgh Mayor's Committee on Human Resources to examine the "democratization of social welfare" through increasing the influence of poor people over the institutions serving them.

Reviewing it in the Monthly Labor Review, Robinson Hollister praised the book's compact treatment of community action theory. She also wrote positively about its account of the recruitment problems facing professional organizers, but she felt the single Pittsburgh case was too thin to test the broader theories. She also questioned the sharp opposition its title draws between clients and constituents. Writing in International Social Work, G. Hendriks judged the study valuable and recommended that similar projects be undertaken in other countries. He noted Gilbert's finding that the Pittsburgh program pursued the democratization of welfare only weakly, and left the poor with little influence over the institutions that served them.

=== Dimensions of Social Welfare Policy ===
Gilbert's textbook Dimensions of Social Welfare Policy was written first with Harry Specht and in later editions with Paul Terrell. The book sets out his four-dimensional framework for analyzing the design of social welfare policy across four areas: benefit allocation, social provision, service delivery, and financing. The framework has been used by scholars to classify and compare the design and outcomes of social welfare policies across different countries. Reviewing an early edition for Social Work, Bernard M. Shiffman described it as concise and information-packed. However, he thought the book's title misleading, since the book works more as an introduction to how policies are developed than as an analysis of policy "dimensions". Writing in Social Casework, Leonard M. Bloksberg called it an important and conceptually significant contribution that brought order to social welfare policy analysis. He recommended it as essential reading for social work practitioners beginning to study the field.

=== Capitalism and the Welfare State (1983) ===
Capitalism and the Welfare State: Dilemmas of Social Benevolence was published in 1983. The book examines how the American welfare state changed after 1960. In it, Gilbert traces the commercialization of social services as public funding increasingly supported private provision and profit-making firms entered the sector. He argued that these trends made the programs more coherent, but pushed the poor and dependent to the margins. In the book, he calls for a renewed vision of welfare capitalism that balances the social and economic markets.

The book was generally well received. However, reviewers pointed out the limits of its scope. It was included in the New York Times New & Noteworthy paperbacks. In The New York Times, Robert B. Reich called Gilbert's thesis plausible and well documented. However, he pointed out that the book traced the erosion of a welfare ideal it never clearly defined. Edward J. Harpham, reviewing the book in the American Journal of Sociology, called it sensitively argued but pointed out its failure to weigh the expansion of major social-insurance programs. John Tropman, in the Journal of Policy Analysis and Management, called it "provocative but uneven". The book was reviewed by Terry Bamford in the British Journal of Social Work who found it a readable and thoughtful treatment. Writing in Library Journal, Harry Frumerman praised its fresh material and sharp insights. However, he found the text to be dense and best suited to academic libraries.

=== The Enabling State (1989) ===
The Enabling State: Modern Welfare Capitalism in America (Oxford University Press, 1989) was co-authored with Barbara Gilbert. The book contends that while the US followed a traditional model of welfare state between the New Deal and the 1970s when the state funded and provided social provisions, over the next decades an "enabling state" has developed where public action was redefined in terms of financing services in the private market and promoting private responsibility.

Reception was mixed. In his review in Society, William A. Donohue praised it as the most mature account then available and a model of social science research. He appreciated its sober treatment of an ideologically charged subject. However, he questioned the authors' treatment of tax expenditures as equivalent to direct transfers. Larry W. Isaac, in the American Journal of Sociology, was impressed with its data on privatization. However, he criticized its thin theorizing and its uncritical acceptance of the public/private distinction.

=== With the Best of Intentions (1991) ===
With the Best of Intentions: The Child Sexual Abuse Prevention Movement (Guilford Press, 1991), co-authored with Jill Duerr Berrick, evaluates school-based child sexual abuse prevention programs in California and questions both their measured effectiveness and the assumptions underlying them; it followed the authors' earlier study of preschool prevention curricula, Protecting Young Children from Sexual Abuse: Does Preschool Training Work? (1989).

The book was the subject of a symposium in Children and Youth Services Review. Kathleen Coulborn Faller of the University of Michigan sharply criticized it as an unbalanced account that understated evidence of the programs' value while emphasizing their limitations; the symposium also carried a more favorable review by Douglas J. Besharov and Lisa A. Laumann, who credited Berrick and Gilbert with performing a valuable service by evaluating a program that had been treated as beyond criticism and called the book a warning to administrators, professionals, and parents that abuse-prevention programs needed to be better designed and run.

=== Welfare Justice (1995) ===
Welfare Justice: Restoring Social Equity (Yale University Press, 1995) collects essays contending that social welfare should rest on "equity", a social contract of reciprocal responsibilities between citizen and state, rather than on equality as the rationale for redistribution.

The book drew mixed to favorable reviews. Randi Mandelbaum, in the UC Law SF Journal on Gender and Justice, called its treatment of social equity admirable while criticizing pervasive internal inconsistencies. David Stoesz, in Social Work, wrote that the book should provoke debate over the retreat from federal responsibility for welfare, though he considered it undercut by having been written before the 1994 Republican takeover of Congress. Brigitte Berger, in The Wall Street Journal, praised it as a timely and thoughtfully argued book and welcomed Gilbert's call to rebalance benefits and obligations and to disclose the hidden middle-class subsidies of the welfare state, while faulting his characterization of the welfare debate.

=== Combatting Child Abuse (1997) ===
Gilbert edited the book entitled Combatting Child Abuse: International Perspectives and Trends, which was published in 1997 by Oxford University Press. The book brings together a series of country studies of the United States, Canada, England, and several European nations, each following a common framework covering the definition of child abuse. Gilbert draws a central distinction between "child protection" systems, which are legalistic, and adversarial, and "family service" systems, which are therapeutic and built on partnership.

The reviews praised the book while pointing out missed opportunities. Writing in Social Service Review, Brenda D. Smith wrote that the book is a rich source of comparative data whose potential was only partly realized because its concluding analysis left much of that material unexplored. Rachael Hetherington, in International Social Work, viewed it as a welcome and substantial contribution to the comparative literature on child welfare. However, she felt its coverage was shaped by the particular countries included.

=== Activating the Unemployed (2001) ===
With Rebecca A. Van Voorhis, Gilbert co-edited Activating the Unemployed: A Comparative Appraisal of Work-Oriented Policies. The book is based on national studies of the effects of work-oriented "activation" policies across nine countries. In his review of book in Contemporary Sociology, Jon Kvist welcomed the volume as a useful overview of current trends in work-oriented policy. He recommended it to scholars and policymakers, but also wrote that its country chapters were uneven and that the editors refrained from drawing large-scale comparisons.

=== Transformation of the Welfare State (2004) ===
In this book, Gilbert extended the argument of his book The Enabling State, and argued that that advanced welfare states are converging on a market-oriented model he calls the "enabling state." According to him, this model promotes paid work and privatizes the financing and delivery of services.

Amitai Etzioni wrote the foreword for the book and praised it while flagging unresolved questions about the balance of rights and responsibilities. Daniel Béland wrote a review of the book in Perspectives on Politics, calling it accessible and concise but wanting a systematic model of policy change. In Social Forces, Jason Beckfield praised its comparative evidence on retrenchment. However, it criticized the book's tone of inevitability. European reviewers were also favorable. Željko Šević, in Comparative Sociology, called it an interesting and ideologically balanced study. Ivan Grgurić, in Revija za socijalnu politiku, described it as a valuable account of change in the modern welfare state.

=== A Mother's Work (2008) ===
Gilbert's book A Mother's Work: How Feminism, the Market, and Policy Shape Family Life was published in 2008. It examines how women navigate the competing demands of paid employment and motherhood. It further analyzes how capitalism and public policy impact those choices. Gilbert proposes a typology of women's family commitments: traditional, neo-traditional, modern, and postmodern. He argues that conventional "family-friendly" benefits can reinforce the devaluation of motherhood. He recommends that measure should be taken such as a home-care allowance so that economic value would be attached to caregiving.

Reception was mixed. The book was reviewed by Jennifer Lynn Heller in the Journal of Family and Economic Issues. She welcomed its analysis of the pressures facing women but felt it overlooked the social rewards of paid work. Judith Kleinfeld reviewed the book in Gender Issues and wrote that she found the analysis and its international comparisons valuable. However, she doubted that a home-care allowance could achieve Gilbert's aims. In Journal of Policy Practice, Jaimie Page praised its data and policy ideas but criticized its narrow focus on largely white families. Cheryl Hyde, in the Journal of Sociology & Social Welfare, praised the book's insight and its questioning of the assumption that economic necessity drives mothers into the labor force, but felt feminism functioned as a "straw woman" in the argument and that the book overlooked the role of men's choices. Sandra Tsing Loh's Atlantic essay pairing the book with Linda Hirshman's Get to Work was selected for The Best American Magazine Writing 2009.

=== Child Protection Systems (2011) ===
Gilbert co-edited with Marit Skivenes and Nigel Parton the book Child Protection Systems: International Trends and Orientations. It compares the social policies and professional practices surrounding child maltreatment across ten European and North American countries. The book builds on Gilbert's earlier distinction between child-protection and family-service orientations and charts the emergence of a child-focused orientation.

The volume was well received. In the British Journal of Social Work, Lucy Rai wrote a review in which she called in "essential reading" and a valuable springboard for discussion. James K. Whittaker, in Social Service Review, praised its clarity and concluded that it succeeded on several levels. Ingrid Höjer wrote a review of the book in International Social Work. She found it useful and richly informative with reservations only about the structure of its chapters.

=== Never Enough (2017) ===
Never Enough: Capitalism and the Progressive Spirit (Oxford University Press, 2017) challenges what Gilbert regards as progressive orthodoxy on four questions (poverty, inequality, social mobility, and the scope of the welfare state), arguing that each has been overstated. In its place he advocates a "progressive conservatism" of incremental, empirically grounded, and largely means-tested policies.

The response was divided. Reviewing the book Hedva Sarfati wrote in the International Social Security Review that she found its issues substantively argued and its historical perspective useful to policymakers. Mark R. Rank was more critical. He wrote in Social Service Review that the book leaned on cherry-picked evidence and lapsed into psychoanalyzing its opponents.

== Other work ==
Beyond his major monographs and comparative volumes, Gilbert has written on advocacy research. In work including his article "Advocacy Research and Social Policy" (1997), he argued that research produced to advance a cause is prone to data distortion and to methodological flaws that can exaggerate the scale of social problems. His Public Interest article "The Phantom Epidemic of Sexual Assault" (1991), which contended that prominent estimates of date rape had been methodologically distorted, drew protests at Berkeley and national press coverage.

With Harry Specht, Gilbert also edited Planning for Social Welfare: Issues, Models, and Tasks (Prentice-Hall, 1977), a collection of readings on social welfare planning organized into sections on whether to plan, models of planning, planning as a socio-political process, and its technical aspects.

With Richard P. Barth and Jill Duerr Berrick, Gilbert co-edited the two-volume Child Welfare Research Review (Columbia University Press, 1994 and 1997), collecting empirical studies on child neglect, kinship care, foster family care, and family reunification.

With Kyungbae Chung, Gilbert co-edited The Korean Welfare State: Social Investment in an Aging Society (Oxford University Press, 2024), a nine-chapter volume examining South Korea's welfare state as a case of the "social investment state".

Gilbert chairs the International Editorial Council of the International Journal of Social Welfare, co-edited the Prentice Hall Series in Social Welfare, the Praeger Series on the Social Services, and the Oxford University Press Series on International Policy Exchange. Gilbert is Co-Editor-in-Chief of the Oxford University Press Library on International Social Policy and served as the U.S. Delegate to Oxford University Press for Social Work and Sociology. He has served on the board of trustees of the Head-Royce School and as board chair of the Seneca Family of Agencies.

Gilbert appeared in Generation Baby Buster (2012), a documentary film by Terra Renton on declining birth rates and the choices women face over motherhood; the film was an official selection of the Calgary International Film Festival.

== Awards and honors ==
- 1981 Fulbright Senior Research Scholar, National Institute for Social Work, London
- 1982 Fulbright Lecturer, Tel Aviv University and Haifa University
- 1987 Fulbright Western European Research Fellowship, London School of Economics and University of Stockholm
- 2007 Sidney Ball Lecture, Oxford University
- 2014 Fellow, American Academy of Social Work and Social Welfare
- 2026 Doctor honoris causa, Universidad Nacional de Educación a Distancia, Madrid

== Bibliography ==
=== Selected books ===
- Gilbert, Neil (1970). Clients or Constituents: Community Action in the War on Poverty. San Francisco: Jossey-Bass.
- Gilbert, Neil; Specht, Harry, eds. (1977). Planning for Social Welfare: Issues, Models, and Tasks. Prentice-Hall.
- Gilbert, Neil; Gilbert, Barbara (1989). The Enabling State: Modern Welfare Capitalism in America. Oxford University Press. ISBN 9780195058949.
- Berrick, Jill Duerr; Gilbert, Neil (1991). With the Best of Intentions: The Child Sexual Abuse Prevention Movement. Guilford Press.
- Barth, Richard P.; Berrick, Jill Duerr; Gilbert, Neil, eds. (1994). Child Welfare Research Review, Volume 1. Columbia University Press.
- Berrick, Jill Duerr; Barth, Richard P.; Gilbert, Neil, eds. (1997). Child Welfare Research Review, Volume 2. Columbia University Press. ISBN 9780231106528.
- Gilbert, Neil; Van Voorhis, Rebecca, eds. (2003). Changing Patterns of Social Protection. New Brunswick, NJ: Transaction Publishers.
- Gilbert, Neil (2004). Transformation of the Welfare State: The Silent Surrender of Public Responsibility. Oxford University Press. ISBN 9780195140743.
- Gilbert, Neil; Terrell, Paul (2005). Dimensions of Social Welfare Policy. Pearson Allyn and Bacon. ISBN 9780205408108.
- Gilbert, Neil (2008). A Mother's Work: How Feminism, the Market and Policy Shape Family Life. New Haven: Yale University Press.
- Gilbert, Neil (2017). Never Enough: Capitalism and the Progressive Spirit. New York: Oxford University Press.
- Gilbert, Neil (2023). Combatting Child Abuse: International Perspectives and Trends. Oxford University Press. ISBN 9780197742167.
- Daly, Mary; Pfau-Effinger, Birgit; Gilbert, Neil; Besharov, Douglas, eds. (2023). Oxford International Handbook of Family Policy: A Life Course Perspective. New York: Oxford University Press.
- Berrick, Jill; Gilbert, Neil; Skivenes, Marit, eds. (2023). International Handbook of Child Protection Systems. New York: Oxford University Press.
- Chung, Kyungbae; Gilbert, Neil, eds. (2024). The Korean Welfare State: Social Investment in an Aging Society. New York: Oxford University Press. ISBN 9780197644928.

=== Selected articles ===
- Gilbert, Neil (1977). "The Transformation of Social Services". Social Service Review. 51 (4): 624–641. doi:10.1086/643557.
- Gilbert, Neil (1997). "Advocacy Research and Social Policy". Crime and Justice. 22: 101–148. doi:10.1086/449261.
- Guo, Jing; Gilbert, Neil (2007). "Welfare State Regimes and Family Policy: A Longitudinal Analysis". International Journal of Social Welfare. 16 (4): 307–313. doi:10.1111/j.1468-2397.2006.00480.x.
- Gilbert, Neil (2005). "The Enabling State? From Public to Private Responsibility for Social Protection: Pathways and Pitfalls". OECD Employment and Migration Working Papers (26).
- Gilbert, Neil (2009). "European Measures of Poverty and Social Exclusion: Material Deprivation, Consumption and Satisfaction". Journal of Policy Analysis and Management. 28 (4). doi:10.1002/pam.20471.
- Gilbert, Neil (2012). "A Comparative Study of Child Welfare Systems: Abstract Orientations and Concrete Results". Children and Youth Services Review. 34 (3): 532–536. doi:10.1016/j.childyouth.2011.10.014.
- Gilbert, Neil (2016). "Institutionalized Discontent". Society. 53 (4): 391–397. doi:10.1007/s12115-016-0033-5. PMC 4923080. PMID 27429498.
- Gilbert, Neil (January 5, 2017). "Prosperity, Not Upward Mobility, Is What Matters". The Atlantic.
