= Sociobiological theories of rape =

Theories about how evolutionary adaptation influences the psychology of rapists

Sociobiological theories of rape are theories that posit that, by studying animal and plant sexual behaviors, rape by humans can be explained as a biological drive for genetic fitness.

Most sociobiologists describe rape in human populations as a cost-benefit analysis in reproductive fitness to claim that the primary motivation for rape is biological. This is a heavily disputed and controversial claim, as it goes directly against the current consensus that rape is emotionally and culturally motivated. Sociobiological theories of rape became more common as the women's rights movements increased in relevance during the 1970s, which implies that the popularity of the area may be political in nature.

Research in the field is often accused of cherry picking their subjects, anthropomorphistic fallacies, moralizing animal behavior, and conflating the meaning of scientific terms that use common words, such as selfishness, with their vernacular meaning.

== Conceptualizations of "rape" in non-human beings ==
Animals are not truly capable of rape, as they lack the discernment to provide or deny consent. Sociobiologists will often use the word "rape" to describe an array of sexual animal practices. Those include forceful sex, but also mating plugs or cuckoldry in fish. The word "rape" has been ascribed to many species in nature, including geese and dolphins, but also to insects and flowers.

Thornhill posits that, in scorpionflies, a species in which the male presents the female with food before mating, a male scorpionfly that forcefully copulates with a female scorpionfly without doing so "rapes" the insect. In so doing, he conflates the highly rigid courtship dances of insects with human relationship norms, such as dating. Hummingbirds also have a mating ritual involving the exchange of food to the female. Larry Wolf, calls the females of hummingbirds "prostitutes" for accepting this exchange even outside their fertile window, but do not call them "prostitutes" if they do so during their mating season. Critics have pointed so that, by following this logic, a human prostitute would not be considered so if they got pregnant during their services.

Observations of forced sex in animals are uncontroversial; controversial are the interpretation of these observations and the extension of theories based on them to humans. In sociobiology, male animals are presented as active spreader of genes while females take on a more passive role. Because behaviors sociobiologists define as "rape" increases reproductive success they have been analysed comparatively by sociobiologists with rape in humans to the conclusion that rape confers evolutionary advantages to the aggressor, particularly if he is in the bottom of the social ladder. This goes in opposition with feminist theory, positing that rape is an act of violence motivated by feelings of anger and the desire for power.

== Rape in human society ==
Thornhill and Palmer write that "In short, a man can have many children, with little inconvenience to himself; a woman can have only a few, and with great effort." Females thus tend toward selectivity with sexual partners. They point to several other factors indicating that rape may be a reproductive strategy. Most rapes occur during prime childbearing years. Rapists usually use no more force than necessary to subdue, argued to be since physically injuring victims would harm reproduction. Moreover, "In many cultures rape is treated as a crime against the victim's husband."

Anthropologist Edward H. Hagen states in his Evolutionary Psychology FAQ from 2002 that he believes there is no clear evidence for the hypothesis that rape is adaptive. He believes the adaptivity of rape is possible, but claims there is not enough evidence to be certain one way or the other. However, he encourages such evidence to be obtained: "Whether human males possess psychological adaptations for rape will only be answered by careful studies seeking evidence for such cognitive specializations. To not seek such evidence is like failing to search a suspect for a concealed weapon." He also describes some conditions in the ancestral environment during which the reproductive gains from rape may have outweighed the costs:

- "High status males may have been able to coerce matings with little fear of reprisal."
- "Low status women (e.g., orphans) may have been particularly vulnerable to being raped because males need not have feared reprisals from the woman's family."
- "During war, raping enemy women may have had few negative repercussions."
- "Men who were low status, who were likely to remain low status, and who had few opportunities to invest in kin may have realized reproductive benefits that outweighed the considerable costs (e.g., reprisal by the woman's family)."

McKibbin et al. (2008) argue that there may be several different types of rapists or rape strategies. One is rape by disadvantaged men who cannot get sex otherwise. Another is "specialized rapists" who are more sexually aroused from rape than from consensual sex. A third type is opportunistic rapists who switch between forced and consensual sex depending on circumstances. A fourth type is psychopathic rapists. A fifth type is partner rape due to sperm competition when the male suspects or knows that the female has had sex with another male. There are varying degrees of empirical support for the existence of each of these types. More generally they mention research finding that at least one-third of males "admit they would rape under specific conditions" and that other surveys find that many men state having coercive sexual fantasies. They, as have others, "propose that rape is a conditional strategy that may potentially be deployed by any man."

=== Women's defenses ===
Women may have developed several defenses against and strategies to avoid rape. One is a partner preference for men that are effective bodyguards against other men such as physically and socially dominant men (although there may also be other evolutionary reasons for such a preference). Another is great psychological pain which according to some research is greatest during the childbearing years. Other researchers have argued that the emotional pain may cause the women to focus on the social circumstances that enabled the rape with the aim to prevent future rapes.

Other research has found that during the fertile phase of the menstrual cycle women perform fewer behaviors that may increase the risk of an assault. Studies have also found that sensitivity for potential coercive behaviors in males as well as handgrip strength (but only in a simulated coercive situation) increase during the fertile phase of the menstrual cycle. On the other hand, a 2003 study found that the frequency of pregnancy from rape is significantly higher than that of pregnancy in non-coercive intercourse, and advanced the hypothesis that male rapists disproportionately target women exhibiting biological indications of fertility.

=== Naturalistic fallacy ===
Thornhill and Palmer write that "Rape is viewed as a natural, biological phenomenon that is a product of the human evolutionary heritage". They further state that by categorizing a behavior as "natural" and "biological" they do not in any way mean to imply that the behavior is justified or even inevitable. "Biological" means "of or pertaining to life," so the word applies to every human feature and behavior. But to infer from that, as many critics assert that Thornhill and Palmer do, that what is biological is somehow right or good, would be to fall into the so-called appeal to nature. They make a comparison to "natural disasters as epidemics, floods and tornadoes". This shows that what can be found in nature is not always good and that measures should be and are taken against natural phenomena. They further argue that a good knowledge of the causes of rape, including evolutionary ones, are necessary in order to develop effective preventive measures.

Evolutionary psychologists McKibbin et al. argue that the claim that evolutionary theories are justifying rape is a fallacy in the same way that it would be a fallacy to accuse scientists doing research on the causes of cancer that they are justifying cancer. Instead, they say that understanding the causes of rape may help create preventive measures.

Wilson et al. (2003) argue that evolutionary psychologists like Thornhill and Palmer use the naturalistic fallacy inappropriately to forestall legitimate discussion about the ethical implications of their theory. According to Thornhill and Palmer, a naturalistic fallacy is to infer ethical conclusions (e.g., rape is good) from (true or false) statements of fact (e.g., rape is natural). Wilson et al. point out that combining a factual statement with an ethical statement to derive an ethical conclusion is standard ethical reasoning, not a naturalistic fallacy, because the moral judgment is not deduced exclusively from the factual statement. They further argue that if one combines Thornhill and Palmer's factual premise that rape increases the fitness of a woman's offspring with the ethical premise that it is right to increase fitness of offspring, the resulting deductively valid conclusion is that rape has also positive effects and that its ethical status is ambiguous. Wilson et al. state that Thornhill and Palmer dismiss all ethical objections with the phrase 'naturalistic fallacy' although "it is Thornhill and Palmer who are thinking fallaciously by using the naturalistic fallacy in this way".

=== Preventing rape ===
Thornhill and Palmer (2000) suggest a number of possible strategies for preventing rape. One example is explaining to males that they may have predispositions to misread the female invitation of sex. They believe that viewing rape as being due to a desire for domination, and not related to sexual desire, is generally harmful. One example given is the claim that the way women dress will not affect the risk of rape. They argue that the much greater societal freedom of dating without supervision, and removal of many barriers between males and females, have created an environment that has also removed many earlier societal controls against rape. It is recommended that "men and women interact only in public places during the early stages of their relationships".

=== Victim counseling ===
Counseling of rape victims may also be improved by evolutionary considerations, according to Thornhill and Palmer, and they argue that the view that rape is due to a domination desire, cannot explain to the victim why the rapist seemed to be sexually motivated.

Evolutionary considerations can also help explain the emotional pain felt, as well as the form it takes. They may also help the rape victim understand why the rape victim's partner may see the rape as a form of infidelity. They also argued that the victim's partner may be helped by such understanding, and be more able to change his or her reaction.

=== Edge cases ===
In sociobiological theory, rape is always and only an act of vaginal penetration with ejaculation. By posing rape as a reproductive strategy of low-status males, critics pose that sociobiology fails to explain a range of cases such as rape. Those include rape by wealthy, high-status and married males, rapes of women too young or old to reproduce, murder-rapes, homosexual rape, oral and anal rape and rape with contraception.

== Criticism ==
The 2003 book Evolution, Gender, and Rape, written in response to A Natural History of Rape, compiles the views of twenty-eight scholars in opposition to sociobiological theories of rape. One contributor, Michael Kimmel, criticizes Thornhill and Palmer's argument that female rape victims tend to be sexually attractive young women, rather than children or older women, contrary to what would be expected if rapists selected victims based on inability to resist. Kimmel argues that younger women are the least likely to be married and the most likely to be out on dates with men, and therefore are the most likely to be raped because of opportunity arising from social exposure and marital status. Palmer and Thornhill responded to these critics in an article in the journal Evolutionary Psychology.

Smith et al. (2001) criticized Thornhill and Palmer's hypothesis that a predisposition to rape in certain circumstances is an evolved psychological adaptation. They developed a fitness cost/benefit mathematical model and populated it with estimates of certain parameters (some parameter estimates were based on studies of the Aché in Paraguay). Their model suggested that generally only men with a future reproductive value of one-tenth or less of a typical 25-year-old man would have a net positive cost/benefit fitness ratio from committing rape. On the basis of their model and parameter estimates, they suggested that this would make it unlikely that rape generally would have net fitness benefits for most men.

While defending the evolutionary psychology theory of rape against its more vehement critics, Vandermassen (2010) provides a critique of some aspects of the view. She characterises the view of Thornhill and Palmer as "extreme" (p. 736), as they fail to allow for the influence of any non-sexual motivations in the crime of rape. Vandermassen also notes two problems with the data cited by Thornhill and Palmer regarding the psychological trauma caused by the violence associated with rape: firstly, the data is inaccurately and confusingly presented in the book, often obscuring the fact that they do not support Thornhill and Palmer's "counterintuitive hypothesis" (p. 744) that more physical violence during rape is associated with less psychological pain. Secondly, more recent research has failed to support this hypothesis. A more moderate position, integrating the evolutionary psychology and feminist theories on rape, is presented by Vandermassen, based in part on the work of feminist evolutionary researcher Barbara Smuts.

Hamilton (2008) has criticized Thornhill and Palmer's definition of rape as the coerced vaginal penetration of women of reproductive age. He has suggested that the exclusion of male rape, rape of women outside the reproductive age range, murderous rape, and non-vaginal forms of rape virtually guaranteed the confirmation of their hypothesis that rape is an evolved reproductive strategy and not a crime of violence. Hamilton has argued that evolutionary psychology fails to explain rape because, by evolutionary psychology's own criteria, an adaptation to rape children or men, or non-vaginal rape, would have been eliminated in the course of evolution because it did not confer reproductive advantage on our ancestors.

Evolutionary psychologist David Buss states that clear-cut evidence for or against rape as an adaptation is lacking. He states that rape may instead be a non-adaptive by-product of other evolved mechanisms, such as desire for sexual variety and for sex without investment, sensitivity to sexual opportunities, and a general capacity for physical aggression.

== See also ==
- Anthropomorphism
- Animal sexual behaviour: coercive sex
- Sexual selection
- Violence against women
