= Steven Landsburg =

American professor of economics

Steven E. Landsburg
- Born: February 24, 1954 (age 72)

Academic background
- Influences: Ronald Coase

Academic work
- Discipline: Economics
- School or tradition: Chicago school of economics
- Institutions: University of Rochester

Steven E. Landsburg (born February 24, 1954) is an American professor of economics at the University of Rochester in Rochester, New York. From 1989 to 1995, he taught at Colorado State University. Landsburg is also an outspoken commentator on economic, legal, and political issues whose comments have sometimes been regarded as controversial.

== Education ==
Landsburg was an undergraduate at the University of Rochester. He received a PhD in mathematics from the University of Chicago in 1979.

== Writings and work ==
=== Commentary and opinions ===
Landsburg wrote a column on "everyday economics" for Slate magazine from 1996 to 2008. The subjects of the columns were diverse and often drew on current affairs. In them, Landsburg discussed the national debt, the obesity crisis, payments to Hurricane Katrina evacuees in New Orleans and salary caps in the NFL. Landsburg also discussed recent research in micro-economics and its implications, as in an article on the value of mobile phones and driving, the (career) cost of motherhood, and whether or not daughters (as opposed to sons) cause divorce.

Landsburg also addressed legal issues: in a Slate column from 2003, he proposed punishing jurors when a jury's decision is later "proven" to be wrong, such as when an acquitted defendant later admits to committing the crime. If a jury's judgment is later "proven" to be right, Landsburg suggested the jurors should be financially rewarded.

Landsburg has been particularly critical of mainstream environmentalism, having devoted both Slate columns and book chapters (in The Armchair Economist) to criticize environmentalist principles. As a self-described "hardcore libertarian", Landsburg emphasizes the importance of individual choice. This position extends to healthcare and his view that those who choose no insurance should not receive potentially life-saving treatment. This position was asserted partly as a response to an article published by Daily Kos.

Landsburg supports free trade and opposes protectionism, and his writings in the topic have appeared in various newspapers and magazines, including The New York Times and The Washington Post. Landsburg's comparison of protectionism to racism in Forbes magazine prompted a response from Pat Buchanan. On April 8, 2005, Landsburg debated protectionism and free trade with John Gibson on the Fox News Channel's The Big Story. Before the 2004 presidential election Landsburg stated that he planned to vote against John Kerry because of his belief that John Edwards, Kerry's running mate, was a "xenophobe" due to his opposition to free trade. He compared Edwards' views to David Duke's racism.

He has also reviewed popular economics books Freakonomics and The Undercover Economist for the Wall Street Journal.

Landsburg has spoken at many distinguished events and in February 2012 he spoke at Warwick Economics Summit and the Adam Smith Institute in the United Kingdom.

In March 2012, Landsburg supported some of pop radio personality Rush Limbaugh's attacks against a Georgetown University student Sandra Fluke. Fluke spoke before Congress advocating mandating birth control coverage in some insurance programs, citing their use in preventing ovarian cysts. "There are really good arguments for subsidizing and bad arguments for subsidizing [birth control]," Landsburg said during an interview with WHAM-TV. "However, [Fluke] didn't bother to make any. She made no argument. She simply said she wanted it subsidized." On his blog, Landsburg discussed Limbaugh's calling Fluke a "slut", and said "A far better word might have been 'prostitute' (or a five-letter synonym therefor), but that's still wrong because Ms. Fluke is not in fact demanding to be paid for sex...The right word for that is something much closer to 'extortionist'." Landsburg's comments drew a rebuke from University of Rochester President Joel Seligman, who said he was "outraged that any professor would demean a student in this fashion", and a silent protest from thirty UR students who formed a line between him and his students during one of his classes.

In a blog post from March 20, 2013, titled "Censorship, Environmentalism and Steubenville," Landsburg spawned controversy when discussing principles on which to justify what is legal. He proposed as a second attempt that "You can do anything you want as long as you're not causing anybody direct physical harm"; he proceeds to conduct an argument by demonstrating that "it would also allow you to rape an unconscious victim if there were no physical consequences". This outcome, in obvious violation of common sense, is then evidence against the second principle.

A petition calling on the university to censure Landsburg received several hundred signatures; this petition, along with a student-led protest outside Landsburg's classroom, attracted national media attention. In response, Landsburg issued an apology in which he said that he had assumed all of his regular blog readers would know that he found rape repugnant, and that the point of the post was to illustrate the paradoxes that arise when trying to prove such obvious conclusions from first principles.

=== Academic writings ===
Landsburg's articles in academic journals have dealt with many fields, including algebraic K-theory, module patching, philosophy of science and, moral philosophy.

=== Teaching ===
Landsburg teaches intermediate and advanced microeconomics at the University of Rochester. He was promoted from adjunct associate professor to professor during the 2005–2006 academic year and in 2007 he received the university's Professor of the Year in Social Sciences award.

== Personal ==
For several years, Landsburg served on the board of directors of Hutchinson Technology, a manufacturer of suspension assemblies for disk drives.

Landsburg lives in Rochester, NY. He has one daughter, named Cayley, who was featured in his book Fair Play.

He has eastern European Jewish heritage. Landsburg is an atheist.

== Books ==
- Price Theory and Applications (1989)
- The Armchair Economist (1993)
- Macroeconomics (1996)
- Fair Play (1997)
- More Sex is Safer Sex, The Unconventional Wisdom of Economics (2007)
- The Big Questions: Tackling the Problems of Philosophy with Ideas from Mathematics, Economics and Physics (2009)
- Can You Outsmart an Economist? (2018)
