= Stacey Kabat =

American anti-domestic violence activist

- Born: 1962 or 1963 (age 62–63)
- Education: Bates College; Simmons College (BSN)
- Occupation: Nurse
- Known for: Defending Our Lives

Stacey Kabat (born 1962/1963) is a human rights activist and filmmaker known for her advocacy for victims of domestic violence. She was one of the three co-producers of the Academy Award-winning short documentary film, Defending Our Lives.

== Early life and education ==
Kabat was born to Mary Beth (Kimberly) Kabat and grew up in a suburb of Detroit. She was raised in a violent home, having a mother and grandmother who were beaten by their husbands. She graduated from Bates College in 1985. She got her Bachelor of Science in Nursing from Simmons College in 2001.

== Career ==
Kabat had spent time working with refugees in Gaza for Amnesty International. She later returned to the US to work with women in a women's shelter and felt there were parallels between women fleeing an abusive home and the plight of refugees, that they were both human rights issues. She started a Boston-area group called Battered Women Fighting Back! (which later changed its name to Peace at Home) which was a community-based task force of volunteers that under to advocate for addressing domestic violence, a problem which Kabat called a "national emergency." Part of this work involved putting together a legal team who would work for women who needed legal support. Part of it involved telling the stories of domestic abuse to the media, putting names and faces to the problem that people would not discuss. She began to receive media coverage for these women and for their predicaments.

Kabat felt that it was important for women to tell these stories and through her work at Framingham State Prison as a substance abuse and domestic violence counselor. She created a support group for women who had killed their intimate partners, a group which eventually became known as the Framingham Eight. This group lobbied the Commonwealth of Massachusetts for commutations of their sentences in 1993 and were mostly successful.

Kabat met filmmakers Margaret Lazarus and Renner Wunderlich at a political demonstration in 1990. When Defending Our Lives won the Academy Award, Kabat ignored the acceptance speech guidance she'd been given and said "Domestic violence is the leading cause of injury to women in the United States... Please, we need all your help to stop this." from the awards podium. After winning the Academy Award, Kabat traveled the country speaking and showing the film for a few years. The film is used on courses on domestic violence law. She co-produced two other films with Lazarus and Wunderlich: Strong at the Broken Places: Turning Trauma to Recovery (1998) and Women's Rights, Human Rights (1999).

In 2001 she became a maternal/child health nurse and a lactation consultant at Mass General Hospital.

== Honors and awards ==
- Reebok Human Rights Award for her efforts with abused women, including her work founding the nonprofit Peace At Home. (1992)
- Clara Barton Award from the American Red Cross’s New England chapter for her work against domestic violence.
- BWFB! named one of America's Best Run Charities by Financial World (1993)
