= 66th Academy Awards =

- Official poster by Saul Bass
- Date: March 21, 1994
- Site: Dorothy Chandler Pavilion; Los Angeles, California, U.S.
- Hosted by: Whoopi Goldberg
- Produced by: Gil Cates
- Directed by: Jeff Margolis

Highlights
- Best Picture: Schindler's List
- Most awards: Schindler's List (7)
- Most nominations: Schindler's List (12)

TV in the United States
- Network: ABC
- Duration: 3 hours, 18 minutes
- Ratings: 46.26 million 31.86% (Nielsen ratings)

The 66th Academy Awards ceremony, organized by the Academy of Motion Picture Arts and Sciences (AMPAS), honored films released in 1993 and took place on March 21, 1994, at the Dorothy Chandler Pavilion in Los Angeles beginning at 6:00 p.m. PST / 9:00 p.m. EST. During the ceremony, AMPAS presented Academy Awards (commonly referred to as Oscars) in 23 categories. The ceremony, televised in the United States by ABC, was produced by Gil Cates and directed by Jeff Margolis. Actor Whoopi Goldberg hosted the show for the first time. Nearly a month earlier in a ceremony held at The Beverly Hilton in Beverly Hills, California on February 26, the Academy Awards for Technical Achievement were presented by host Laura Dern.

Schindler's List won seven awards, including Best Picture. Other winners included Jurassic Park and The Piano with three awards, Philadelphia with two, and The Age of Innocence, Belle Époque, Defending Our Lives, The Fugitive, I Am a Promise: The Children of Stanton Elementary School, Mrs. Doubtfire, Schwarzfahrer, and The Wrong Trousers with one. The telecast was watched by more than 46 million viewers in the United States.

== Winners and nominees ==
The nominees for the 66th Academy Awards were announced on February 9, 1994, at the Samuel Goldwyn Theater in Beverly Hills, California, by Academy president Arthur Hiller and actress Christine Lahti. Schindler's List led all nominees with twelve nominations; The Piano and The Remains of the Day tied for second with eight.

The winners were announced during the awards ceremony on March 21, 1994. Best Director nominee Jane Campion became the second woman to be nominated in that category. Holly Hunter and Emma Thompson's nominations in both lead and supporting acting categories marked the first, and so far, only occurrence that two performers earned double acting nominations in the same year. Best Supporting Actress winner Anna Paquin became the first Millennial member to win an Academy Award and, at age 11, the second youngest winner of a competitive acting Oscar, behind Tatum O'Neal, who won at age 10 for Paper Moon (1973).

=== Awards ===
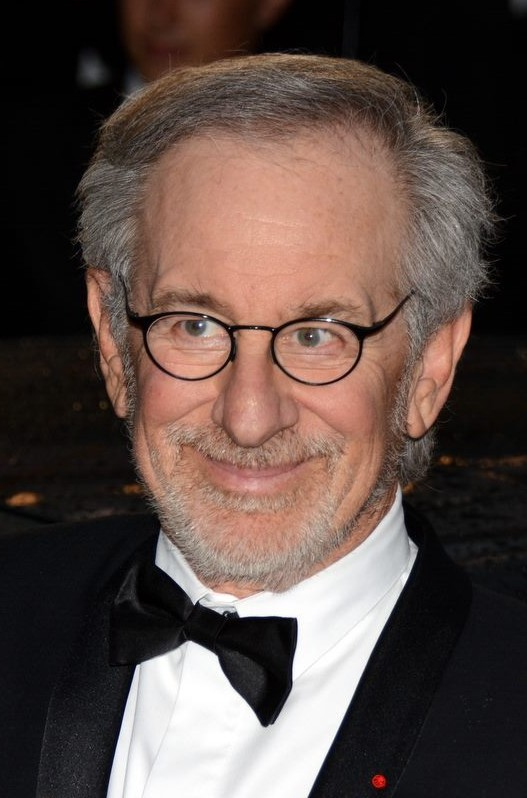
Steven Spielberg, Best Picture co-winner and Best Director winner

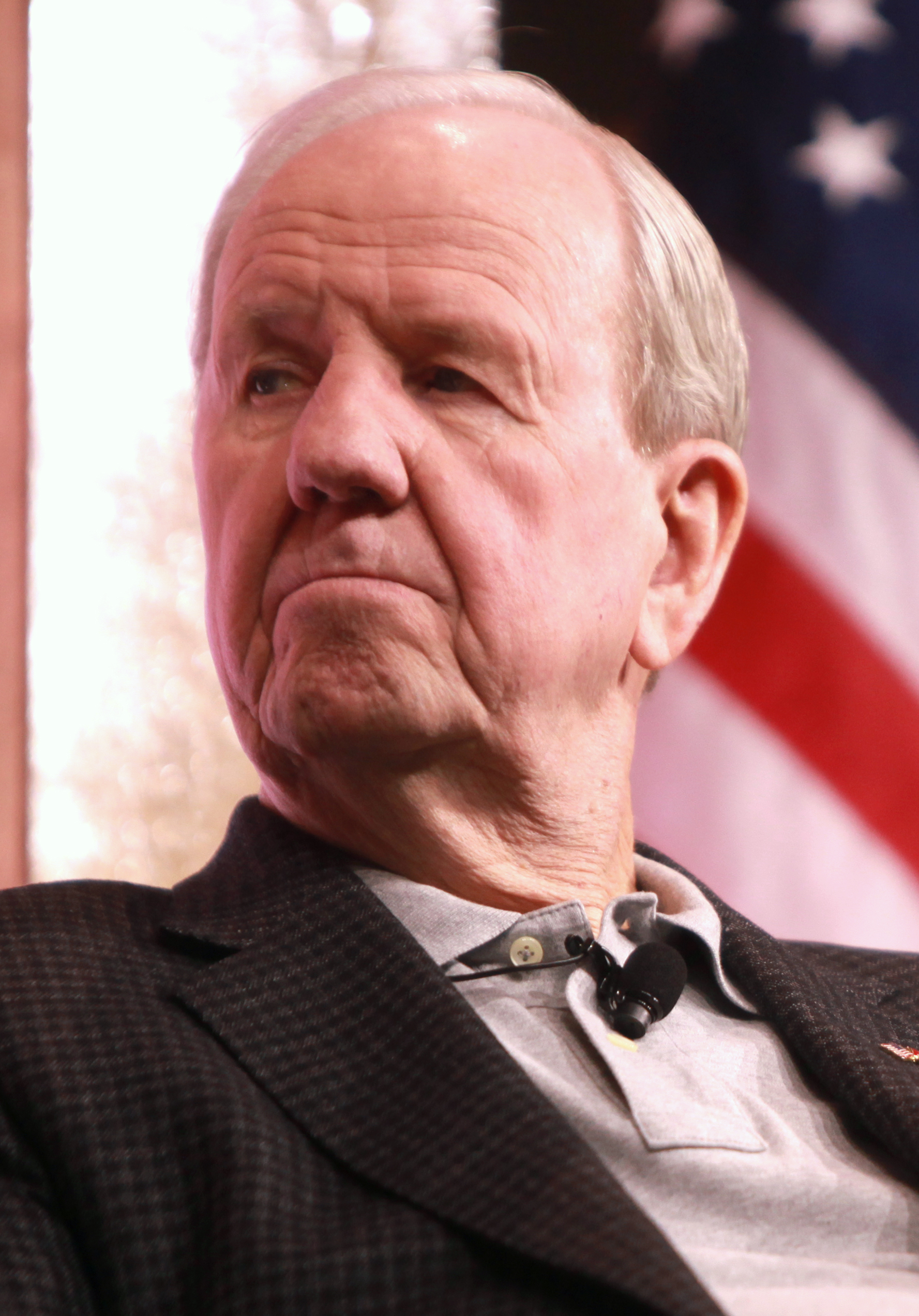
Gerald R. Molen, Best Picture co-winner

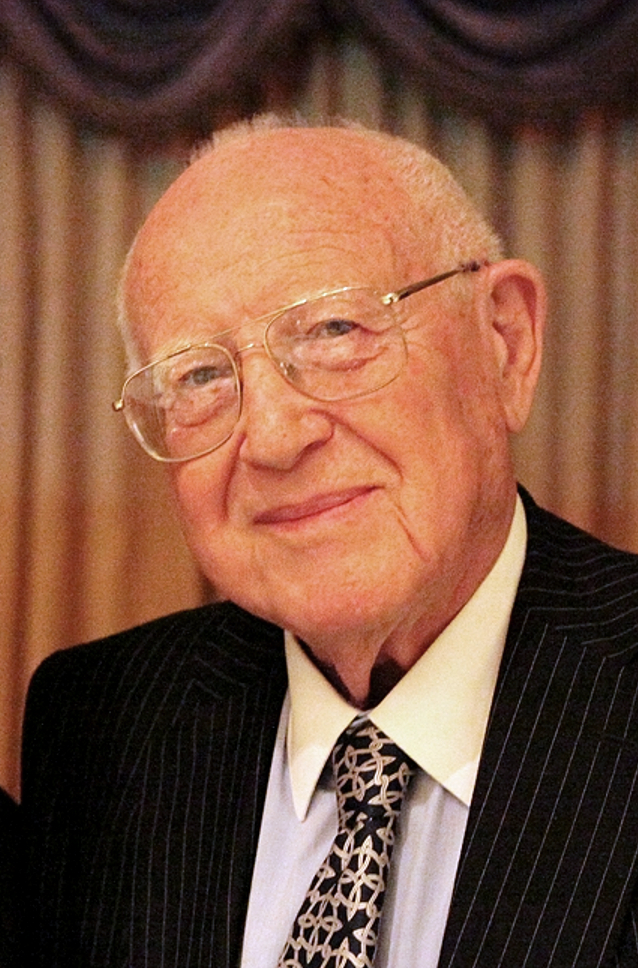
Branko Lustig, Best Picture co-winner

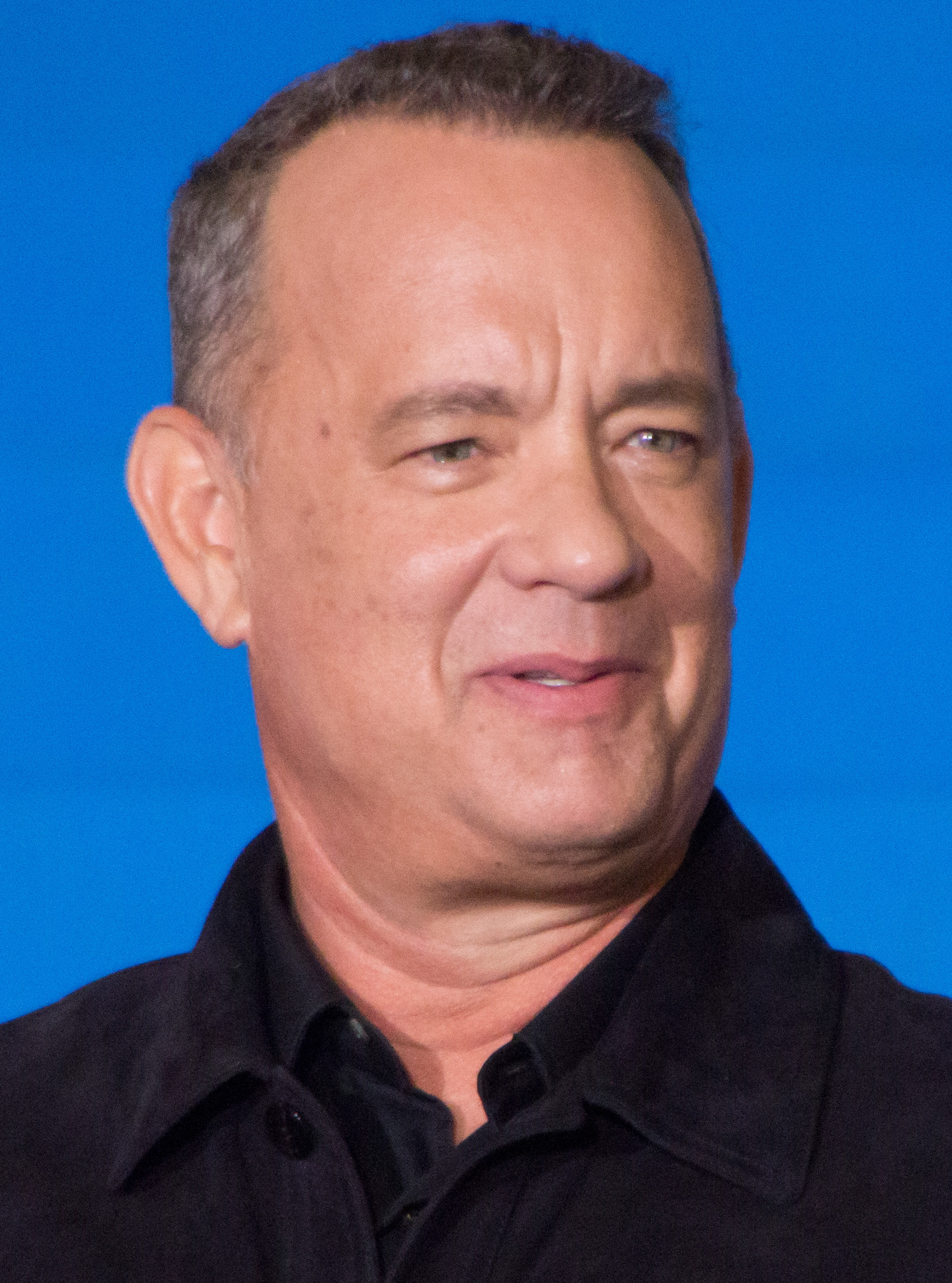
Tom Hanks, Best Actor winner

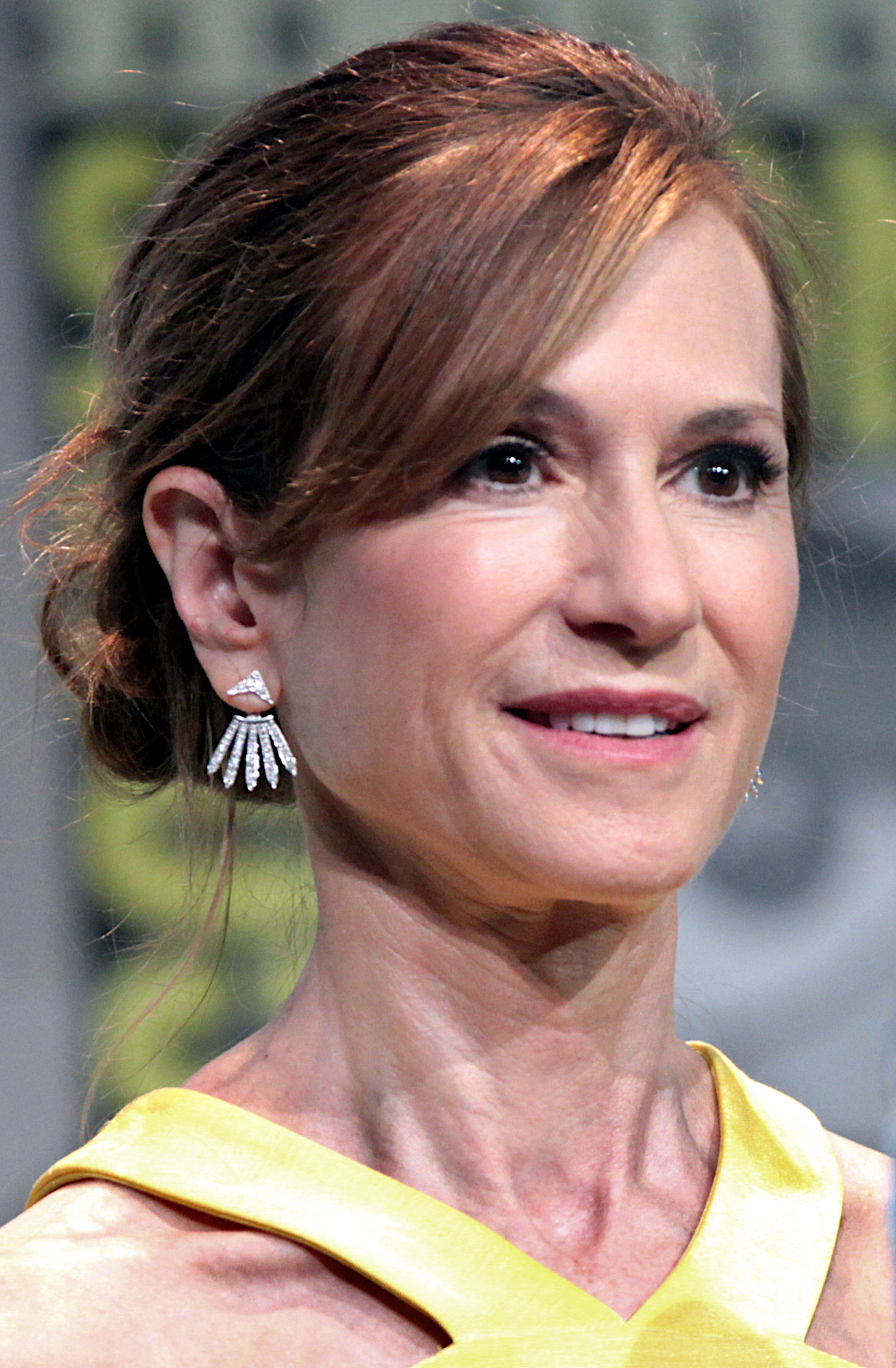
Holly Hunter, Best Actress winner

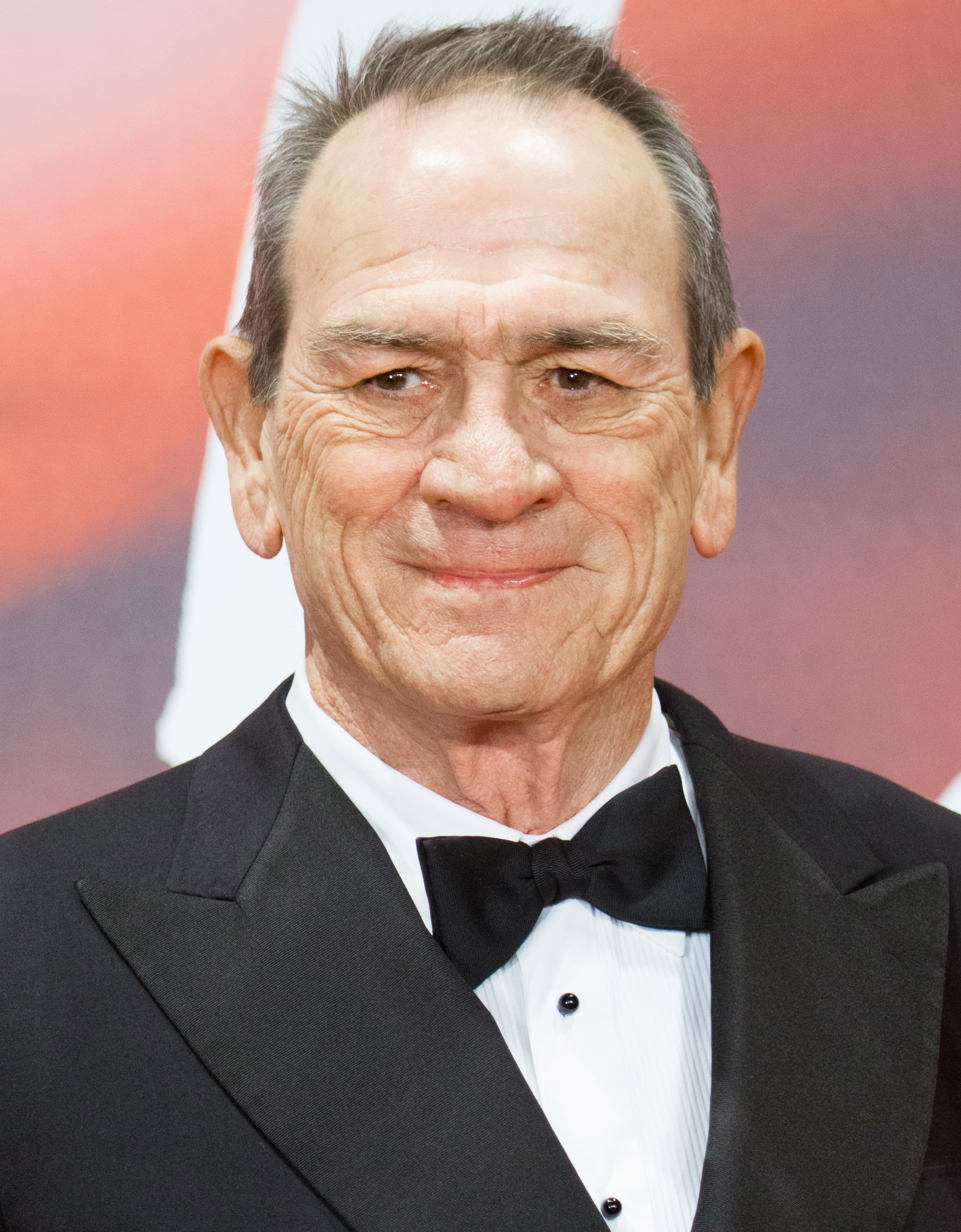
Tommy Lee Jones, Best Supporting Actor winner

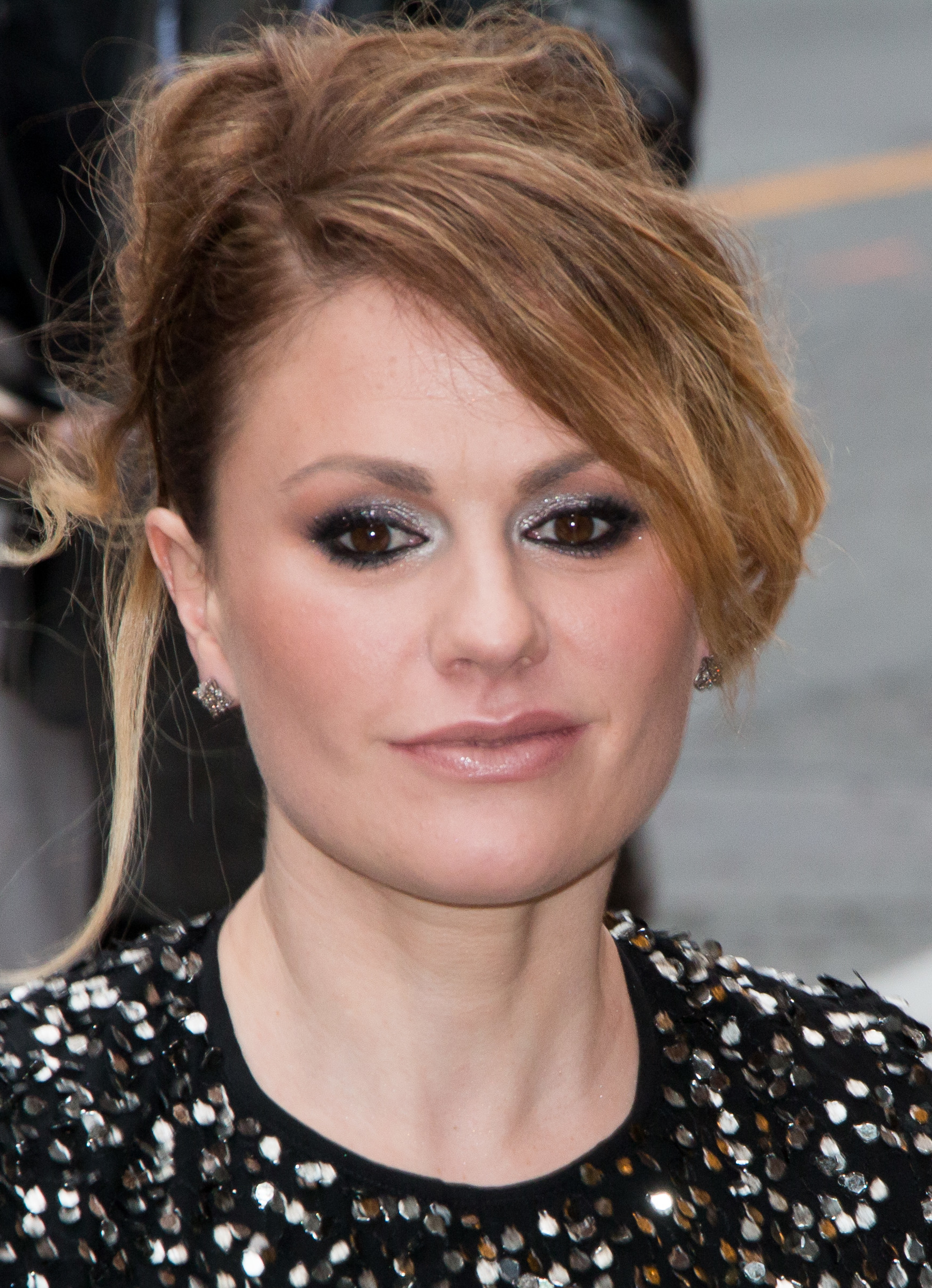
Anna Paquin, Best Supporting Actress winner

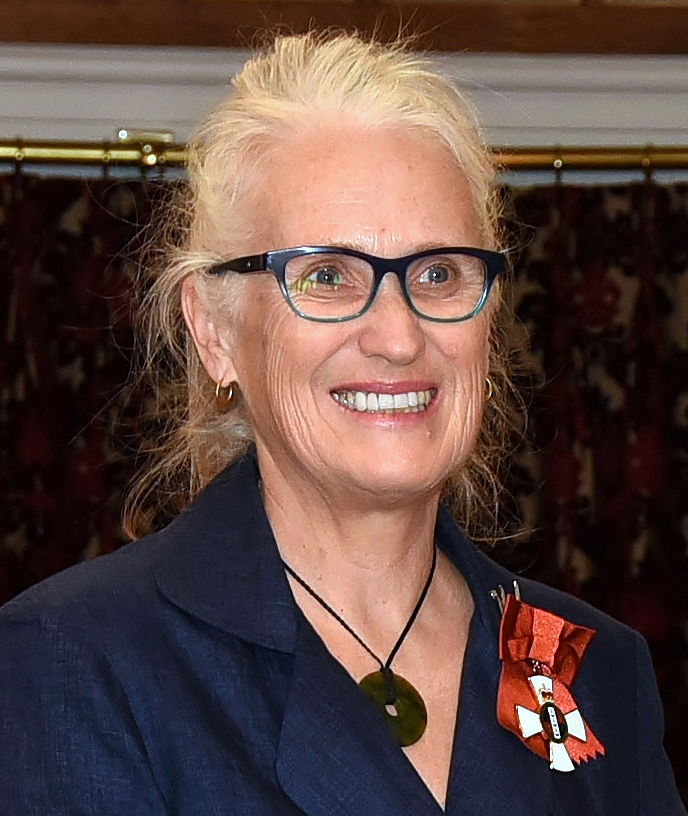
Jane Campion, Best Original Screenplay winner

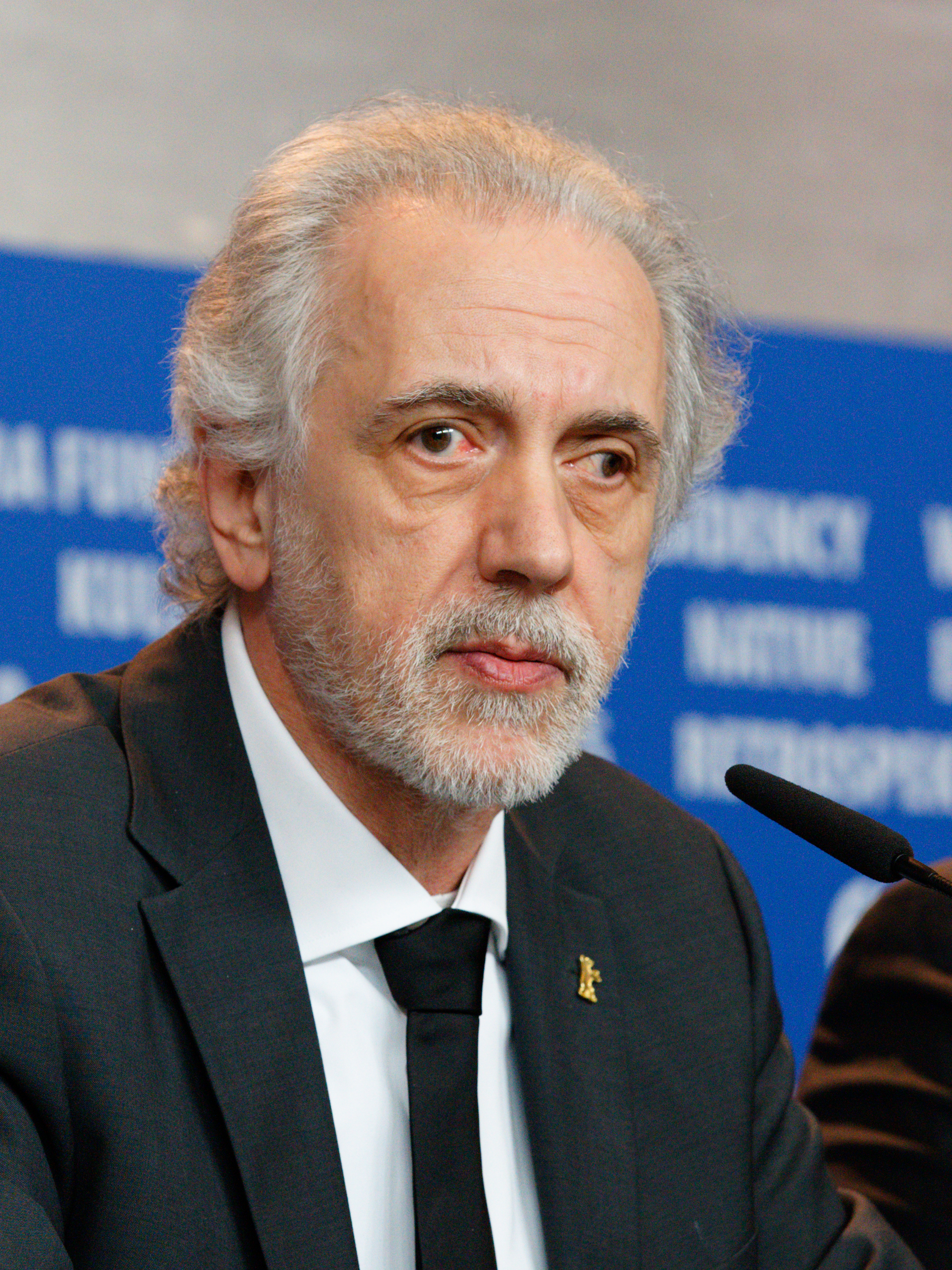
Fernando Trueba, Best Foreign Language Film winner

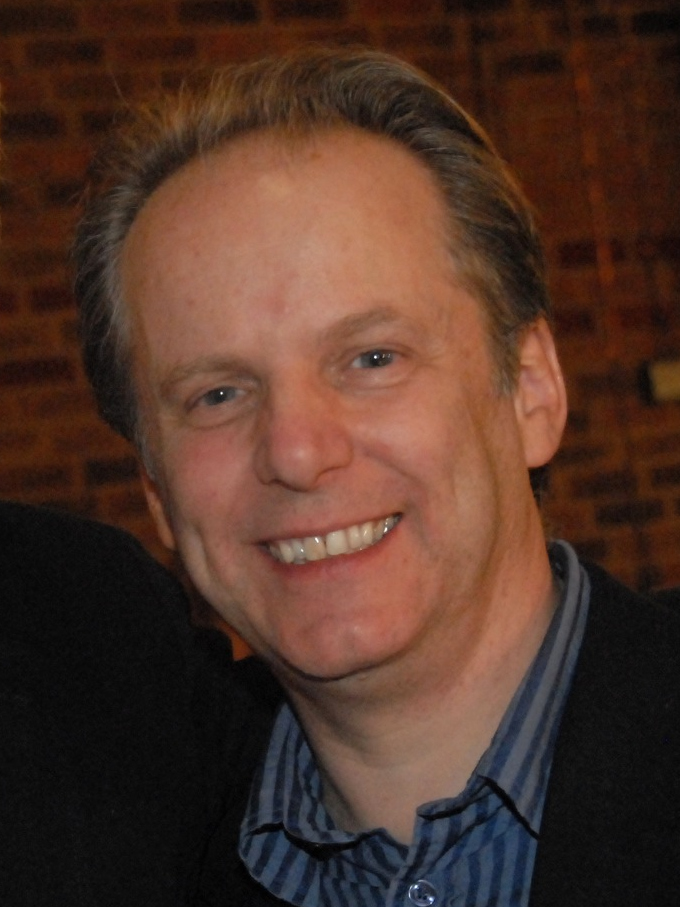
Nick Park, Best Animated Short Film winner

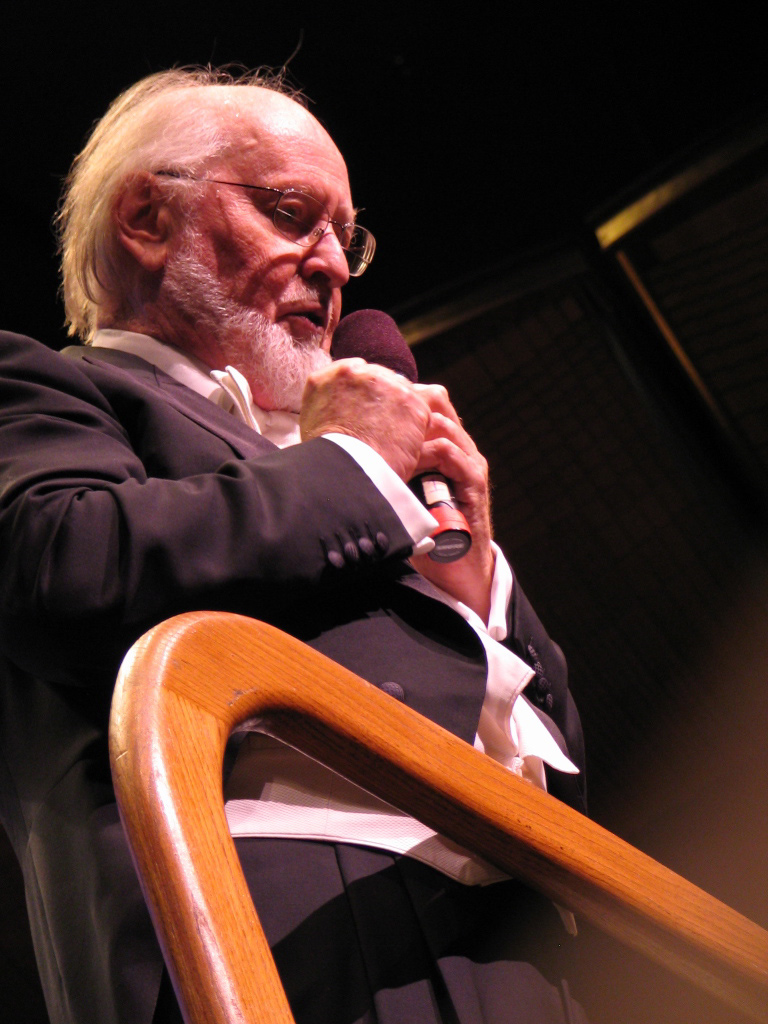
John Williams, Best Original Score winner

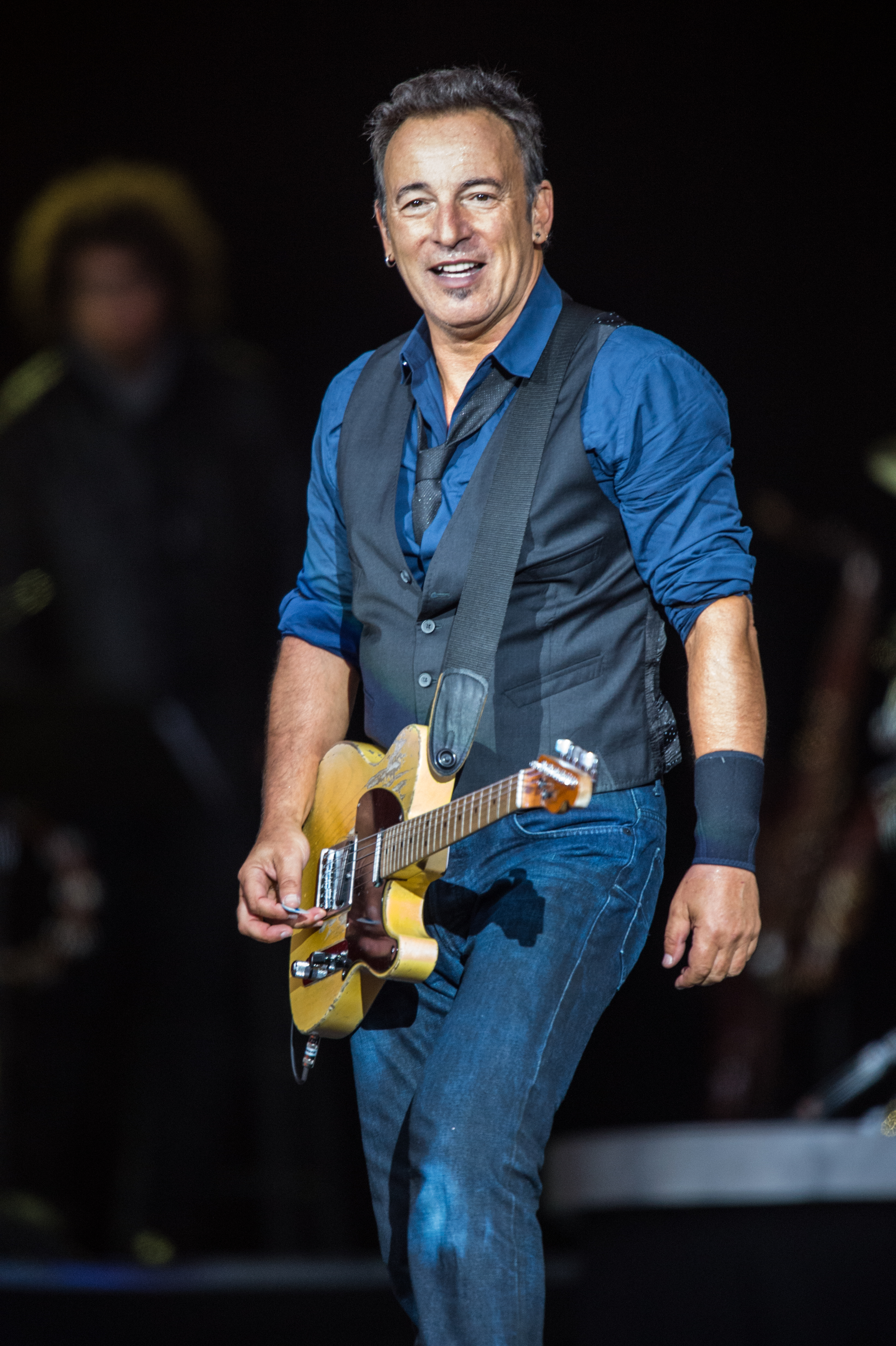
Bruce Springsteen, Best Original Song winner

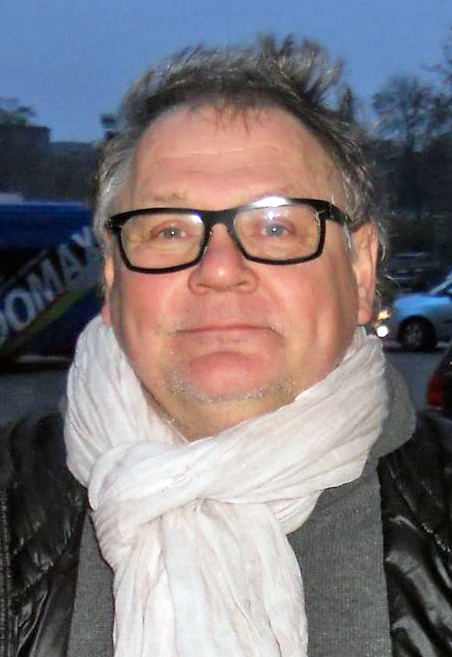
Janusz Kamiński, Best Cinematography winner

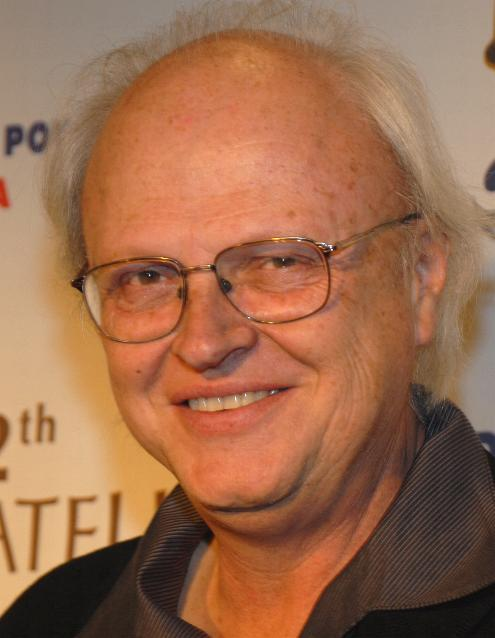
Dennis Muren, Best Visual Effects co-winner

Winners are listed first, highlighted in boldface, and indicated with a double-dagger (‡).

**Best Picture**: **Schindler's List – Steven Spielberg, Gerald R. Molen, and Branko Lustig, producers**‡; The Fugitive – Arnold Kopelson, producer; In the Name of the Father – Jim Sheridan, producer; The Piano – Jan Chapman, producer; The Remains of the Day – John Calley, Mike Nichols, and Ismail Merchant, producers	**Best Directing**: **Steven Spielberg – Schindler's List**‡; Jim Sheridan – In the Name of the Father; Jane Campion – The Piano; James Ivory – The Remains of the Day; Robert Altman – Short Cuts
**Best Actor in a Leading Role**: **Tom Hanks – Philadelphia as Andrew Beckett**‡; Daniel Day-Lewis – In the Name of the Father as Gerry Conlon; Laurence Fishburne – What's Love Got to Do with It as Ike Turner; Anthony Hopkins – The Remains of the Day as James Stevens; Liam Neeson – Schindler's List as Oskar Schindler	**Best Actress in a Leading Role**: **Holly Hunter – The Piano as Ada McGrath**‡; Angela Bassett – What's Love Got to Do with It as Tina Turner; Stockard Channing – Six Degrees of Separation as Ouisa Kittredge; Emma Thompson – The Remains of the Day as Sarah "Sally" Kenton; Debra Winger – Shadowlands as Joy Davidman
**Best Actor in a Supporting Role**: **Tommy Lee Jones – The Fugitive as U.S. Marshal Samuel Gerard**‡; Leonardo DiCaprio – What's Eating Gilbert Grape as Arnold "Arnie" Grape; Ralph Fiennes – Schindler's List as Amon Göth; John Malkovich – In the Line of Fire as Mitch Leary; Pete Postlethwaite – In the Name of the Father as Giuseppe Conlon	**Best Actress in a Supporting Role**: **Anna Paquin – The Piano as Flora McGrath**‡; Holly Hunter – The Firm as Tamara "Tammy" Hemphill; Rosie Perez – Fearless as Carla Rodrigo; Winona Ryder – The Age of Innocence as May Welland; Emma Thompson – In the Name of the Father as Gareth Peirce
**Best Writing (Screenplay Written Directly for the Screen)**: **The Piano – Jane Campion**‡; Dave – Gary Ross; In the Line of Fire – Jeff Maguire; Philadelphia – Ron Nyswaner; Sleepless in Seattle – Nora Ephron, David S. Ward, and Jeff Arch	**Best Writing (Screenplay Based on Material Previously Produced or Published)**: **Schindler's List – Steven Zaillian based on the book by Thomas Keneally**‡; The Age of Innocence – Martin Scorsese and Jay Cocks based on the novel by Edith Wharton; In the Name of the Father – Jim Sheridan and Terry George based on the autobiographical book Proved Innocent by Gerry Conlon; The Remains of the Day – Ruth Prawer Jhabvala based on the novel by Kazuo Ishiguro; Shadowlands – William Nicholson based on his play
**Best Foreign Language Film**: **Belle Époque (Spain) in Spanish – Fernando Trueba, director**‡; Farewell My Concubine (Hong Kong) in Mandarin Chinese – Chen Kaige, director; Hedd Wyn (United Kingdom) in Welsh – Paul Turner, director; The Scent of Green Papaya (Vietnam) in Vietnamese – Anh Hung Tran, director; The Wedding Banquet (Taiwan) in Mandarin Chinese – Ang Lee, director	**Best Documentary (Feature)**: **I Am a Promise: The Children of Stanton Elementary School – Susan Raymond and Alan Raymond**‡; The Broadcast Tapes of Dr. Peter – David Paperny and Arthur Ginsberg; Children of Fate: Life and Death in a Sicilian Family – Susan Todd and Andrew Young; For Better or for Worse – David Collier and Betsy Thompson; The War Room – D. A. Pennebaker and Chris Hegedus
**Best Documentary (Short Subject)**: **Defending Our Lives – Margaret Lazarus and Renner Wunderlich**‡; Blood Ties: The Life and Work of Sally Mann – Steven Cantor and Peter Spirer; Chicks in White Satin – Elaine Holliman and Jason Schneider	**Best Short Film (Live Action)**: **Schwarzfahrer – Pepe Danquart**‡; Down on the Waterfront – Stacy Title and Jonathan Penner; The Dutch Master – Susan Seidelman and Jonathan Brett; Partners – Peter Weller and Jana Sue Memel; The Screw (La vis) – Didier Flamand
**Best Short Film (Animated)**: **The Wrong Trousers – Nick Park**‡; Blindscape – Stephen Palmer; The Mighty River – Frédéric Back and Hubert Tison; Small Talk – Bob Godfrey and Kevin Baldwin; The Village – Mark Baker	**Best Music (Original Score)**: **Schindler's List – John Williams**‡; The Age of Innocence – Elmer Bernstein; The Firm – Dave Grusin; The Fugitive – James Newton Howard; The Remains of the Day – Richard Robbins
**Best Music (Original Song)**: **"Streets of Philadelphia" from Philadelphia – Music and Lyrics by Bruce Springsteen**‡; "Again" from Poetic Justice – Music and Lyrics by Janet Jackson and Jimmy Jam and Terry Lewis; "The Day I Fall in Love" from Beethoven's 2nd – Music and Lyrics by Carole Bayer Sager, James Ingram, and Clif Magness; "Philadelphia" from Philadelphia – Music and Lyrics by Neil Young; "A Wink and a Smile" from Sleepless in Seattle – Music by Marc Shaiman; Lyrics by Ramsey McLean	**Best Sound**: **Jurassic Park – Gary Rydstrom, Gary Summers, Shawn Murphy, and Ron Judkins**‡; Cliffhanger – Michael Minkler, Bob Beemer, and Tim Cooney; The Fugitive – Donald O. Mitchell, Michael Herbick, Frank A. Montaño, and Scott D. Smith; Geronimo: An American Legend – Chris Carpenter, Doug Hemphill, Bill W. Benton, and Lee Orloff; Schindler's List – Andy Nelson, Steve Pederson, Scott Millan, and Ron Judkins
**Best Sound Effects Editing**: **Jurassic Park – Gary Rydstrom and Richard Hymns**‡; Cliffhanger – Wylie Stateman and Gregg Baxter; The Fugitive – John Leveque and Bruce Stambler	**Best Art Direction**: **Schindler's List – Art Direction: Allan Starski; Set Decoration: Ewa Braun**‡; Addams Family Values – Art Direction: Ken Adam; Set Decoration: Marvin March; The Age of Innocence – Art Direction: Dante Ferretti; Set Decoration: Robert J. Franco; Orlando – Art Direction: Ben Van Os and Jan Roelfs; The Remains of the Day – Art Direction: Luciana Arrighi; Set Decoration: Ian Whittaker
**Best Makeup**: **Mrs. Doubtfire – Greg Cannom, Ve Neill, and Yolanda Toussieng**‡; Philadelphia – Carl Fullerton and Alan D'Angerio; Schindler's List – Christina Smith, Matthew W. Mungle, and Judith A. Cory	**Best Costume Design**: **The Age of Innocence – Gabriella Pescucci**‡; Orlando – Sandy Powell; The Piano – Janet Patterson; The Remains of the Day – Jenny Beavan and John Bright; Schindler's List – Anna B. Sheppard
**Best Cinematography**: **Schindler's List – Janusz Kamiński**‡; Farewell My Concubine – Gu Changwei; The Fugitive – Michael Chapman; The Piano – Stuart Dryburgh; Searching for Bobby Fischer – Conrad Hall	**Best Film Editing**: **Schindler's List – Michael Kahn**‡; The Fugitive – Dennis Virkler, David Finfer, Dean Goodhill, Don Brochu, Richard Nord, and Dov Hoenig; In the Line of Fire – Anne V. Coates; In the Name of the Father – Gerry Hambling; The Piano – Veronika Jenet
**Best Visual Effects**: **Jurassic Park – Dennis Muren, Stan Winston, Phil Tippett, and Michael Lantieri**‡; Cliffhanger – Neil Krepela, John Richardson, John Bruno, and Pamela Easley; The Nightmare Before Christmas – Pete Kozachik, Eric Leighton, Ariel Velasco-Shaw, and Gordon Baker

=== Honorary Award ===
- To Deborah Kerr, in appreciation for a full career's worth of elegant and beautifully crafted performances.

=== Jean Hersholt Humanitarian Award ===
- Paul Newman

=== Films with multiple nominations and awards ===
The following 16 films had multiple nominations:

Nominations	Film
12	Schindler's List
8	The Piano
8	The Remains of the Day
7	The Fugitive
7	In the Name of the Father
5	The Age of Innocence
5	Philadelphia
3	Cliffhanger
3	In the Line of Fire
3	Jurassic Park
2	Farewell My Concubine
2	The Firm
2	Orlando
2	Shadowlands
2	Sleepless in Seattle
2	What's Love Got to Do with It

The following four films received multiple awards:

Awards	Film
7	Schindler's List
3	Jurassic Park
3	The Piano
2	Philadelphia

== Presenters and performers ==
The following individuals, listed in order of appearance, presented awards or performed musical numbers:

=== Presenters ===
Name(s)	Role
Les Marshak	Announcer for the 66th annual Academy Awards
Arthur Hiller (AMPAS president)	Gave opening remarks welcoming guests to the awards ceremony
Tom Hanks	Presenter of the award for Best Art Direction
Elijah Wood	Presenter of the award for Best Visual Effects
Jeff Bridges	Presenter of the film The Fugitive on the Best Picture segment
Marisa Tomei	Presenter of the award for Best Supporting Actor
Joan Chen; Val Kilmer	Presenters of the award for Best Makeup
Liam Neeson	Presenter of the award for Best Sound Effects Editing
Glenn Close	Presenter of the Honorary Academy Award to Deborah Kerr
Rosie O'Donnell	Presenter of the awards for Best Animated Short Film and Best Live Action Short Film
Richard Dreyfuss	Presenter of the film Schindler's List on the Best Picture segment
Nicolas Cage; Shirley MacLaine	Presenters of the award for Best Sound
Gene Hackman	Presenter of the award for Best Supporting Actress
Laura Dern	Presenter of the segment of the Academy Awards for Technical Achievement and the Gordon E. Sawyer Award
Johnny Depp	Introducer of the performance of Best Original Song nominee "Philadelphia"
Alec Baldwin	Presenter of the film The Remains of the Day on the Best Picture segment
Sharon Stone	Presenter of the award Best Costume Design
Nicole Kidman; Christian Slater	Presenters of the awards for Best Documentary Short Subject and Best Documentary Feature
Goldie Hawn	Introducer of the special dance number to the tune of the Best Original Score nominees and presenter of the award for Best Original Score
Jack Valenti	Presenter of the "Film cinematography" montage and introducer of presenter Kirk Douglas
Kirk Douglas	Presenter of the award for Best Cinematography
Madeleine Stowe	Presenter of the film The Piano on the Best Picture segment
Tom Cruise	Presenter of the Jean Hersholt Humanitarian Award to Paul Newman
Anthony Hopkins	Presenter of the award for Best Foreign Language Film
Geena Davis	Presenter of the award for Best Film Editing
Antonio Banderas	Introducer of the performance of Best Original Song nominee "Streets of Philadelphia"
Whitney Houston	Presenter of the award for Best Original Song
Jeremy Irons	Presenters of the awards for Best Screenplay Written Directly for the Screen and Best Screenplay Based on Material Previously Produced or Published
Glenn Close	Presenter of the In Memoriam tribute
Emma Thompson	Presenter of the award for Best Actor
Donald Sutherland	Presenter of the film In the Name of the Father on the Best Picture segment
Al Pacino	Presenter of the award for Best Actress
Clint Eastwood	Presenter of the award for Best Director
Harrison Ford	Presenter of the award for Best Picture

=== Performers ===
Name(s)	Role	Performed
Bill Conti	Musical arranger	Orchestral
Bernadette Peters	Performer	"Putting It Together" from Sunday in the Park with George during the opening number
Janet Jackson	Performer	"Again" from Poetic Justice
Neil Young	Performer	"Philadelphia" from Philadelphia
James Ingram; Dolly Parton	Performers	"The Day I Fall in Love" from Beethoven's 2nd
Les Ballets Africains; National Ballet of Canada; Central Ballet of China; Cuban National Ballet; Dance Theatre of Harlem; Garth Fagan Dance Inc. Paris Opera Ballet; Shanghai Ballet Troupe	Performers	Performed dance number synchronized with selections from Best Original Score nominees
Keith Carradine	Performer	"A Wink and a Smile" from Sleepless in Seattle
Bruce Springsteen	Performer	"Streets of Philadelphia" from Philadelphia

== Ceremony information ==
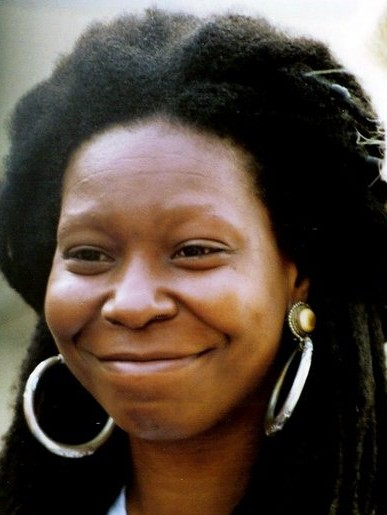
Whoopi Goldberg hosted the 66th Academy Awards.

Due to the negative reception received from the preceding year's ceremony, actor Billy Crystal announced that after overseeing four consecutive Oscar ceremonies, he would not be hosting the 1994 telecast. In a statement released by his publicist, he stated, "After three Grammys, four Oscars and six Comic Reliefs, I'm going to take a break from my hosting duties. I always felt honored to host the show and did my best to carry on the tradition of Bob Hope and Johnny Carson. I hope the new host has as good a time as I did." With Crystal absent to host the Oscars, many media outlets wondered whom producer Gil Cates would hire to emcee the program. Film columnist Jack Matthews suggested that actor Tom Hanks, who would eventually win Best Actor for Philadelphia, should host the show writing that he "has charm, dignity, wit, intelligence and, it's worth mentioning, he's a movie star!" Cates also offered the role to performers Steve Martin, Bette Midler, and Johnny Carson, but they all turned down the opportunity.

After several days of speculation, Cates announced that he hired Oscar-winning actress and comedian Whoopi Goldberg to host the festivities for the first time. By virtue of her selection, Goldberg became both the first African American to host as well as the first woman to host the telecast solo. In an interview with the Los Angeles Times, Cates explained the decision to hire her saying, "She is a highly recognizable star who has millions of fans." He also addressed the media's concerns regarding Goldberg's raunchy and outspoken humor stating, "Some people may think she's potentially dangerous, and she says things that come to her mind. It's going to be exciting for me. The main thing is she wants to do it and she's smart. Whatever she says will be appropriate." Goldberg expressed that she was thrilled to be selected to emcee the 1994 ceremony commenting, "To go from watching to winning to hosting in one lifetime is major."

As with previous ceremonies he produced, Cates centered the show around a theme. This year, he christened the show with the theme "People Behind the Camera" commenting that "It will be a salute to those unseen men and women who make what we see on the screen, the artist and craftspeople responsible for the magic of the movies." In tandem with the theme, the ceremony's opening number featured a montage produced by Chuck Workman saluting the many individuals such as directors, editors, and composers who are involved in moviemaking. During that segment, singer Bernadette Peters performing a modified version of Stephen Sondheim's song "Putting It Together" from his musical Sunday in the Park with George. Filmmaker and editor Carol A. Streit assembled another montage featuring a salute to the work of cinematographers and their contributions to film.

Several other people and elements were also involved with the production of the ceremony. Production designer Roy Christopher designed a new stage for the ceremony which prominently featured five giant Oscar statues each flanked inside metal cones that were illuminated recurrently throughout the show. Film composer and musician Bill Conti served as musical director of the ceremony. Dancer Debbie Allen choreographed a dancer number showcasing the Best Original Score nominees featuring eight prestigious ballet and dance troupes from around the world.

An in memoriam segment was introduced for the first time during the ceremony. In subsequent years, it became the permanent element of the Oscars.

=== Box office performance of nominees ===
At the time of the nominations announcement on February 9, the combined gross of the five Best Picture nominees at the US box office was $261 million, with an average of $52.2 million per film. The Fugitive was the highest earner among the Best Picture nominees with $179 million in domestic box office receipts. The film was followed by Schindler's List ($29.6 million), The Piano ($25.7 million), The Remains of the Day ($19.5 million), and finally In the Name of the Father ($6.5 million).

Of the top 50 grossing movies of the year, 36 nominations went to 14 films on the list. Only The Fugitive (3rd), The Firm (4th), Sleepless in Seattle (6th), In the Line of Fire (7th), Dave (13th), Philadelphia (29th), What's Love Got to Do With It (38th), and The Age of Innocence (49th) were nominated for directing, acting, screenwriting, or Best Picture. The other top 50 box office hits that earned nominations were Jurassic Park (1st), Mrs. Doubtfire (2nd), Cliffhanger (9th), The Nightmare Before Christmas (24th), Addams Family Values (25th), and Beethoven's 2nd (27th).

=== Critical reviews ===
The show received a positive reception from most media publications. The New York Times film critic Janet Maslin raved that the telecast had "less silliness and less small talk, with more emphasis on cleverly chosen film clips and the bona fide Hollywood magic being celebrated." She also praised host Goldberg saying that she "sustained a tone of levity, which became particularly important as the sweep by Schindler's List threatened to bring out great ponderousness in some quarters." Pittsburgh Post-Gazette television critic Robert Bianco commended Goldberg's performance writing that "She never acted like she was too smart or to hip for the show she was hosting; she never smirked like there was a joke she alone was cool enough to get." He also extolled producer Cates by commenting, "In place of the extraneous jokes and terrible production numbers, he gave us a theme that worked and a generous selection of clips to back it up." Anne Thompson of Entertainment Weekly lauded Goldberg by stating, "Her elegant appearance (at least during the first half), her uncharacteristic restraint (she didn't cuss), and her ability to make it funny (despite the very somber speeches) made the ho-hum telecast worth watching."

Some media outlets were more critical of the show. Television critic Howard Rosenberg of the Los Angeles Times lamented that Goldberg's humor "wilted in a blessedly brief 3-hour-and-18-minute telecast." He also wrote that compared with Billy Crystal, her hosting skills were "balmy". Orlando Sentinel film critic Jay Boyar bemoaned that "this year's Oscarcast was only a little more exciting than a wine snob droning on about his favorite vintages." Harold Schindler of The Salt Lake City Tribune remarked that Whoopi's preference for "insider" jokes "left the audience murmuring and most viewers probably scratching their heads." He also added the biggest letdown of the telecast was "Goldberg's seeming ineptness at understanding the moment"

=== Ratings and reception ===
The American telecast on ABC drew in an average of 46.26 million people over its length, which was a 1% increase from the previous year's ceremony. However, the show drew lower Nielsen ratings compared to the previous ceremony with 31.86% of households watching over a 49.28 share. It also drew a lower 18–49 demographic rating with a 19.73 rating over a 40.53 share among viewers in that demographic.

In July 1994, the ceremony presentation received seven nominations at the 46th Primetime Emmys. Two months later, the ceremony won one of those nominations for Outstanding Technical Direction/Camera/Video for a Miniseries or Special (Averill Perry, Jim Ralston, Kenneth R. Shapiro, Bill Pope, Hector Ramirez, Larry Heider, Dave Levisohn, Blair White, Bill Philben, Ralph Alcocer, Larry Stenman, Bud Holland, David Irete, Tom Geren, Dale Carlson, David Plakos, Ted Ashton, Jeff Mydoc, Chuck Pharis, Jean M. Mason).

== "In Memoriam" ==
The first annual "In Memoriam" tribute was presented by actress Glenn Close. The montage featured an excerpt of the main title of Terms of Endearment composed by Michael Gore.

- Lillian Gish
- Myrna Loy
- Joseph Cotten
- Spanky McFarland
- Ruby Keeler
- Telly Savalas
- Melina Mercouri
- Cesar Romero
- Ted Haworth – Production Designer
- Vincent Price
- Stewart Granger
- Samuel Bronston – Producer
- River Phoenix
- Raymond Burr
- Cantinflas
- Alexis Smith
- Joseph L. Mankiewicz – Writer/Director
- Irene Sharaff – Costume Designer
- Helen Hayes
- John Candy
- Sammy Cahn – Songwriter
- Ray Sharkey
- Federico Fellini – Writer/Director
- Hervé Villechaize
- Don Ameche
- Audrey Hepburn
- Brandon Lee
- Dinah Shore
- Fred Gwynne
- Vincent Gardenia

== See also ==
- 14th Golden Raspberry Awards
- 36th Grammy Awards
- 46th Primetime Emmy Awards
- 47th British Academy Film Awards
- 48th Tony Awards
- 51st Golden Globe Awards
- List of submissions to the 66th Academy Awards for Best Foreign Language Film

== Bibliography ==
- Wiley, Mason; Bona, Damien (1996). Inside Oscar: The Unofficial History of the Academy Awards (5 ed.). New York, United States: Ballantine Books. ISBN 0-345-40053-4. OCLC 779680732.
- Levy, Emanuel (2003). All About Oscar: The History and Politics of the Academy Awards. New York, United States: Continuum International Publishing Group. ISBN 0-8264-1452-4.
- Pond, Steve (2005). The Big Show: High Times and Dirty Dealings Backstage at the Academy Awards. New York, United States: Faber and Faber. ISBN 0-571-21193-3.
- Terrance, Vincent (2013). Television Specials: 5,336 Entertainment Programs, 1936–2012 (5 ed.). Jefferson, North Carolina, United States: Ballantine Books, McFarland & Company. ISBN 978-1-4766-1240-9. OCLC 844373010.
