= Framingham Eight =

Eight women in Massachusetts who received clemency on their prison sentences

The Framingham Eight were a group of eight women who were incarcerated in Framingham, Massachusetts for killing an abusive spouse or partner. Seven of the eight women received commutation of their sentences in the 1990s. Their legal struggle became the basis of an Academy Award-winning short documentary film, Defending Our Lives.

== History ==
The Framingham Eight met while serving their sentences at MCI Framingham. Lisa Grimshaw was sentenced for 18–20 years for having her husband killed and was defended by her lawyer Nancy Gertner. Gertner was able to successfully argue that Grimshaw should be found guilty of manslaughter, not murder, using the battered woman defense.

Grimshaw met another woman in MCI Framingham serving a life sentence for stabbing her boyfriend. They, along with other women, began meeting in a weekly support group led by Stacey Kabat, calling itself Battered Women Fighting Back. Susan Howards, the lawyer for Eugenia Moore, coined the term "Framingham Eight" to try to galvanize support for all of the women asking for reduced or suspended sentences as part of a larger national movement.

== Petitions for Clemency ==
In 1992, the women and their legal teams, assembled by Battered Women Fighting Back, presented petitions to Massachusetts Lieutenant Governor Paul Celucci, with many of the lawyers working pro bono. The petitions claimed that the women's sentences should be commuted because the women were acting in self defense and the judges in the cases did not allow evidence of prior abuse or battered women's syndrome. Massachusetts Governor William Weld had relaxed standards of conditions under which women who killed their abusers could request clemency during the previous year.

Governor Weld agreed that the Framingham Eight could present their stories to the Advisory Board of Pardons. Massachusetts legislators introduced a bill allowing battered women's syndrome to be admissible in court, which met with resistance, with detractors like Massachusetts State Representative Douglas Stoddart claiming it would give women "almost a license to kill."

After the Advisory Board of Pardons heard testimony and gave Weld their recommendations, Weld commuted seven of the sentences; with the eighth not being commuted because it was under appeal.

== Aftermath ==
The Framingham Eight had very high visibility after the sentence commutations, with The New York Times calling them "the victim-heroines of the hour".

They became an incorporated entity, Framingham Eight Inc., and several went on the lecture circuit raising awareness about domestic violence. Many of the women had a difficult time rebuilding their lives, often having no job skills and a history of substance use disorder. A few of them became incarcerated again for other offenses. A 1998 Boston Globe article reported that the women found it challenging to be lifted "...into a martyred celebrity, filled with the expectations of domestic violence activists who had found eight symbols for their cause".

The story was the subject of several short documentary films. Defending Our Lives by Margaret Lazarus and Renner Wunderlich came out in 1994, featuring four of the women. It won the Academy Award for short documentary. Shannon Booker watched the Oscar telecast from MCI Framingham. Defending Our Lives also won Outstanding Independent Film of the Year from the New England Film & Video Festival in 1994. Framingham 8: The Women Who Fought Back was produced by ABC News in 2016 and received accolades for raising awareness about domestic violence, but The New York Times review criticized for being a "prime-time variation on afternoon-show psycho-sentimentalizing."

== The Eight ==
- Patricia Allen
- Shannon Booker
- Patricia Hennessey
- Elaine Hyde
- Lisa Becker Grimshaw
- Eugenia Moore
- Debra Reid
- Meekah Scott
