= Holy Land: A Year in the West Bank =

Documentary about the West Bank

- Directed by: Peter Cohn
- Written by: Peter Cohn
- Produced by: Peter Cohn; Babak Rassi; Tal Pesses
- Cinematography: Tal Pesses
- Edited by: David Cohen; Babak Rassi
- Music by: Ted Reichman
- Production company: Hillcrest Films
- Distributed by: New Day Films
- Release date: 2014
- Running time: 70 minutes

Holy Land: A Year in the West Bank is a documentary film that was written and directed by Peter Cohn. The film chronicles a year in the West Bank.

== Synopsis ==
Holy Land follows both Israelis and Palestinians over a period of a year in the West Bank. The Palestinian subjects include a young Palestinian activist in the village of Nabi Saleh and the mayor of Beit Omar, a Palestinian town near Hebron. Israeli subjects include a settler living in Esh Kodesh, a small enclave deemed an "illegal outpost;" an anti-settlement activist from Peace Now, and Menachem Froman, a settler rabbi known for his advocacy of Israeli-Palestinian reconciliation. The film also chronicles the political and legal battle over the fate of the settlement (outpost) of Migron, which was evacuated in 2012 after several appeals to the Supreme Court of Israel were rejected.

== Cast ==
- Menachem Froman
- Aron Kastof
- Hagit Ofran
- Nasri Sabarna
- Mohammad Tamimi

== Production ==
Cohn began planning the project after completing Power and Control: Domestic Violence in America, as he "began thinking about the West Bank, the issues raised by Israeli settlement expansion and also the impact of the Arab Spring on the conflict." In August 2011 Cohn traveled to Israel and the West Bank with his son Ben; this marked the first time the director had traveled to this area or had become involved with any aspect of the Arab-Israeli conflict. While there, Cohn noted that he could "see and feel a film on the way". Cohn returned several more time for filming, for a total of six trips between 2011 and 2012.

== Release ==
The film premiered in the US at the 2014 San Francisco Jewish Film Festival and in the UK at the UK Jewish Film Festival.

== Reception ==
Reception for the film has been generally positive. David Lewis reviewed Holy Land for the SF Gate, stating that Cohn assembled an "interesting cast of character" and that the director "avoids making any judgments about any of these folks." The film also received reviews from Booklist, Library Journal, and the Seattle Met, the last of which wrote that "To his credit, Cohn never settles on a position, but is constantly shifting his focus in order to empathize with the diverse sentiments of those most affected by Israeli’s settlement policy."
