= Peter Cohn (director) =

American film director

Peter Charles Cohn is an American film director, producer and writer.

== Career ==
Cohn's debut film, Drunks, is about an Alcoholics Anonymous meeting. It starred Richard Lewis, Faye Dunaway, Dianne Wiest, Parker Posey and other New York City actors.

Stephen Holden of the New York Times reviewed the movie saying "the movie is so superbly realized by an ensemble of well-known actors that it is impossible not to be moved by their stories". Drunks premiered with a one-time cable TV presentation on Showtime, and was awarded the 1997 entertainment industry Prism Award as one of the "...outstanding efforts by the entertainment industry to portray drug abuse and related violence accurately in films and television programs."

Cohn's subsequent films have been documentaries on relevant social issues. Golden Venture (2006) recounts the story of the Chinese immigrants aboard the freighter Golden Venture that ran aground off a New York City beach in 1993. The film premiered at the Tribeca Film Festival in 2006.

Power and Control: Domestic Violence in America (2010) tells the story of a domestic violence survivor in Duluth, Minnesota. It is set against the broader story of the battered women's movement and the Duluth model, describing the legal and community response to domestic violence.

Holy Land: A Year in the West Bank (2014) follows a group of disparate Israelis and Palestinians in the West Bank over the course of a year, recounting their stories and experiences.

== Personal life ==
His father, Sam Cohn, was a major Hollywood agent who helped create ICM Partners. Cohn and his wife, Ski Cohn, a finance professor, live in the Park Hill neighborhood of Yonkers, New York.

== Filmography ==
- Drunks (1995)
- Golden Venture (2006)
- Power and Control: Domestic Violence in America (2010)
- Holy Land: A Year in the West Bank (2014)
