= Defending Our Lives =

1993 film

- Directed by: Margaret Lazarus; Renner Wunderlich
- Produced by: Margaret Lazarus; Stacey Kabat; Renner Wunderlich
- Production company: Cambridge Documentary Films
- Distributed by: Cambridge Documentary Films
- Release date: 1993
- Running time: 30 minutes
- Country: United States
- Language: English

Defending Our Lives is a 1993 American short documentary film directed by Margaret Lazarus, Stacey Kabat and Renner Wunderlich. It won an Oscar at the 66th Academy Awards in 1994 for Documentary Short Subject. The movie details the legal struggle of four members of the Framingham Eight who tried to get their criminal sentences commuted.

== See also ==
- Domestic Violence Documentaries
- The Conspiracy of Silence, a Public Broadcasting Station (PBS) documentary
- Power and Control: Domestic Violence in America, a documentary about domestic violence and the community-based Duluth Model to reduce domestic violence
- Silent Voices, a United Kingdom documentary
- Sin by Silence, a documentary
