= The Conspiracy of Silence =

- Directed by: Neal Marshad; Donna Olson
- Written by: Neal Marshad; Donna Olson
- Produced by: Neal Marshad; Donna Olson
- Narrated by: Kathleen Turner
- Cinematography: Neal Marshad
- Edited by: Neal Marshad; Donna Olson
- Distributed by: Public Broadcasting Service/Pyramid Media
- Release date: 1995
- Running time: 50 minutes
- Country: United States
- Language: English

The Conspiracy of Silence is a 1995 television documentary that outlines the problem of domestic violence in the United States, and describes some solutions. The title refers to an unspoken pact in an abusive relationship, in which the abuser expects the victim never to disclose the abuse, and the abused complies in the hope of avoiding further violence. The documentary is presented on camera and narrated by Kathleen Turner, with appearances by Denise Brown (sister of Nicole Brown Simpson), Southampton judge Deborah Kooperstein, and others.

Neal Marshad and Donna Olson, who co-wrote and co-directed the film, sought to show that domestic violence is not limited to one culture or social class, and that there is no standard profile for an abuser or an abused person. To this end, they focus on The Retreat, a women's shelter in affluent East Hampton, New York that helps battered women and their children obtain safe shelter and counselling.

The US Public Broadcasting Service (PBS) broadcast The Conspiracy of Silence three times between 1995 and 1996. The film won a Silver Award in the Women's Issues category at WorldFest-Houston International Film Festival in 1996, and an Honorable Mention at the 1996 Columbus International Film & Animation Festival, in the Health & Medicine category.

The New York Times published an article about the documentary on October 22, 1995.

== See also ==
- Domestic Violence Documentaries
- Defending Our Lives (1993), a short American documentary about battered women who are in prison for killing their abusers
- Power and Control: Domestic Violence in America (2010), a documentary about domestic violence and the community-based Duluth Model to reduce domestic violence
- Silent Voices (2005), a British docudrama based on more than 100 interviews conducted by the writer
- Sin by Silence (2009), a US documentary about women who killed their abusive husbands
