= Sin by Silence =

- Directed by: Olivia Klaus
- Produced by: Olivia Klaus
- Starring: Brenda Clubine, Glenda Crosley, Joanne Marchetti, LaVelma Byrd, Glenda Virgil, Rosemary Dyer
- Cinematography: Clark Severson
- Edited by: Ann-Caryn Cleveland
- Music by: Desha Dunnahoe
- Distributed by: Women Make Movies
- Release date: 2009
- Running time: 49 minutes
- Country: United States
- Language: English

Sin by Silence is a domestic violence documentary film by Olivia Klaus about women who have killed their abusive husbands. Based on the first inmate-initiated and led support group in the entire United States prison system, the film reveals the history and stories of the members of the group Convicted Women Against Abuse created by inmate Brenda Clubine in 1989. By following five women's abusive experiences that led to their incarceration, the film take viewers on their journeys from victim to survivors, reveals the history of the Battered Women Syndrome in the state of California, and shatters misconceptions. This documentary is a production of Quiet Little Place Productions.

The film premiered at the Cleveland International Film Festival 2009, and went on to screen nationally as part of the grassroots tour, entitled Stop the Violence, that took the film to over 40 communities in 10 states through the United States.

In 2011, the film had its television premiere on Investigation Discovery to over 2.2 million viewers.

In 2012, Assemblywoman Fiona Ma introduced AB 1593 and AB 593, The Sin by Silence Bills, inspired by the documentary. AB 593 seeks to clarify Penal Code 1473.5 to include the domestic violence victims that were unintentionally denied their original writ of habeas corpus due to limited expert testimony evidence. AB 1593 seeks to provide victims of domestic violence who have suffered Intimate Partner Battering (IPB) a chance to present their evidence in an effective way during the parole process. Both bills were signed into law by Governor Brown on September 30, 2012 to ensure the path to freedom for over 7,000 domestic violence survivors currently serving time in California prisons.

== Press ==
Press Coverage of Sin by Silence

- NPR "All Things Considered" - Domestic Abuse Victims Get Chance At Freedom
- HLN, Dr Drew on Call - Women tell Dr. Drew why they killed their partner
- The Daily Beast - Women Who Kill the Men They Love
- Fox News - Film explores world of abused women put behind bars

== See also ==
- Domestic Violence Documentaries
- The Conspiracy of Silence, a Public Broadcasting Station (PBS) documentary
- Defending Our Lives, a short documentary
- Power and Control: Domestic Violence in America, a documentary about domestic violence and the community-based Duluth Model to reduce domestic violence
- Silent Voices, a United Kingdom documentary
