= George Martin (American actor) =

American actor (1929–2010)

- Martin as the hotel receptionist in Léon: The Professional
- Born: George N. Martin; August 15, 1929; New York City, New York, U.S.
- Died: June 1, 2010 (aged 80); Providence, Rhode Island, U.S.
- Occupation: Actor
- Years active: 1976–2005
- Known for: Hotel Receptionist in Léon: The Professional
- Spouse: Katherine Helmond (m. 1957; div. 1962)

George N. Martin (August 15, 1929 – June 1, 2010) was an American television, stage, and movie actor who is known for his role as the hotel receptionist in Léon: The Professional. A regular at Providence's Trinity Repertory Company, he was nominated for a Tony Award in 1983 for his role in David Hare's Plenty.

== Filmography ==
| Title | Year | Role | Notes |
|---|---|---|---|
| The Scarlet Letter | 1979 | Reverend Wilson | TV miniseries |
| The Dark End of the Street | 1981 | Salvucci | |
| The Royal Romance of Charles and Diana | 1982 | John Spencer, 8th Earl Spencer | TV movie |
| License to Kill | 1984 | Steve | TV movie |
| C.H.U.D. | 1984 | Wilson | |
| The Beniker Gang | 1984 | Judge Pink | |
| Falling in Love | 1984 | John Trainer | |
| The Purple Rose of Cairo | 1985 | Movie Audience | |
| The Man with One Red Shoe | 1985 | Senate Chairman | |
| Crossing Delancey | 1988 | Lionel | |
| Rocket Gibraltar | 1988 | Dr. Bonacker | |
| Dead Poets Society | 1989 | Dr. Hager | |
| Awakenings | 1990 | Frank | |
| He Said, She Said | 1991 | Mr. Bryer | |
| Dying Young | 1991 | Malachi | |
| Dave | 1993 | President's Physician | |
| The Man Without a Face | 1993 | Sam the Barber | |
| Assault at West Point: The Court-Martial of Johnson Whittaker | 1994 | President Rutherford B. Hayes | TV movie |
| Léon: The Professional | 1994 | Receptionist | |
| Quiz Show | 1994 | Chairman | |
| Drunks | 1995 | Marty | |
| The Associate | 1996 | Walter Manchester | |
| One Fine Day | 1996 | Smith Leland | |
| Outside Providence | 1996 | Dean Mort | |
