= Factors associated with being a victim of sexual violence =

Sexual Violence and Victimization
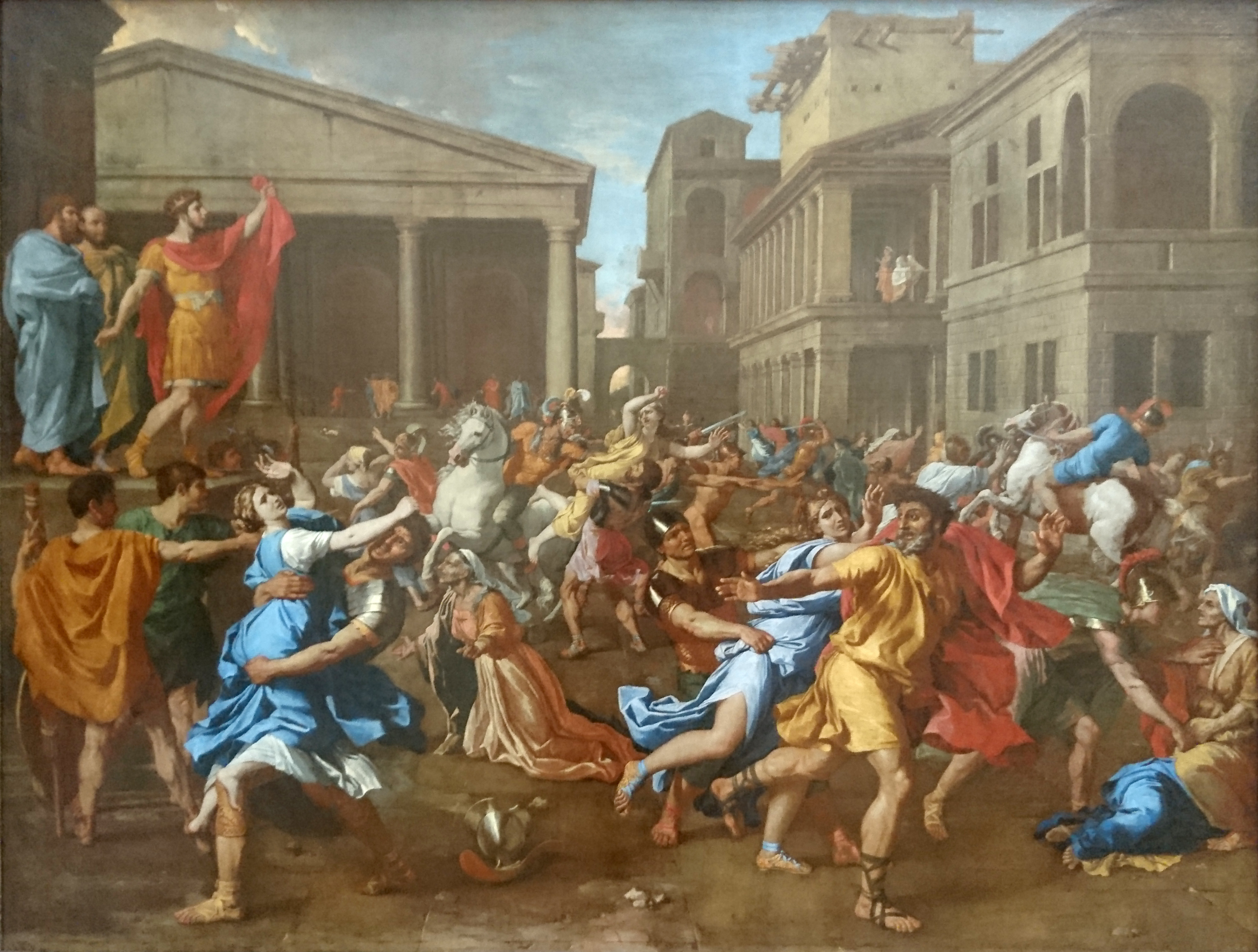

Specific Offenses
- Rape · Statutory Rape · Incest
- Sexual Assault · Domestic violence
- Sexual Abuse · Child sexual abuse
- Sexual Harassment · Pimping
- Attempted rape · Genital mutilation
- Deviant sexual intercourse

Forms of Violence and Victimization
- Types of rape · War rape · Sexual slavery
- Spousal Rape · Prison rape
- Date rape · Date rape drug
- Human trafficking · Prostitution

Victimization of Children
- Child pornography · Child trafficking
- Prostitution of children
- Commercial exploitation

Sociological Theories
- Sociobiological theories of rape
- Motivation for rape · Victim blaming
- Misogyny · Misandry · Aggression
- Pedophilia · Effects and aftermath
- Rape Trauma Syndrome

Social and Cultural Aspects
- Rape culture · History of rape
- raptio · Comfort women ·

Policy
- Laws about rape · Rape shield law
- Laws regarding child sexual abuse
- Rape crisis centre · Honour killing
- Anti-rape female condom · Rape statistics

Portals: Law

One of the most common forms of sexual violence around the world is that which is perpetrated by an intimate partner, leading to the conclusion that one of the most important risk factors for people in terms of their vulnerability to sexual assault is being married or cohabiting with a partner. Other factors influencing the risk of sexual violence include:

- being a girl/woman;
- being young;
- being a sex worker;
- being poor or homeless;
- having a substance use disorder;
- being autistic;
- having been previously raped or sexually abused;
- having multiple sex partners or engaging in risky sexual behavior;
- being incarcerated / institutionalised;
- being mentally ill or intellectually disabled;
- becoming more educated and economically empowered, at least where sexual violence perpetrated by an intimate partner is concerned;
- being part of LGBTQIA+ communities

== Age ==
Young women are usually found to be more at risk of rape than older women. According to data from justice systems and rape crisis centres in Chile, Malaysia, Mexico, Papua New Guinea, Peru, and the United States, between one-third and two-thirds of all victims of sexual assault are aged 15 years or less. Certain forms of sexual violence, for instance, are very closely associated with a young age, in particular violence taking place in schools and colleges, and trafficking in women for sexual exploitation.

Percentage of adolescents reporting forced sexual initiation, selected population-based surveys, 1993—1999
Country or area	Study population	Year	Sample size	Sample age group (years)	Percentage reporting first sexual intercourse as forced (%) female	Percentage reporting first sexual intercourse as forced (%) male
Cameroon	Bamenda	1995	646	12-25	37.3	29.9
Caribbean	Nine countries	1997–1998	15695	10-18	47.6	31.9
Ghana	Three urban towns	1996	750	12-24	21.0	5.0
Mozambique	Maputo	1999	1659	13-18	18.8	6.7
New Zealand	Dunedin	1993–1994	935	Birth cohort	7.0	0.2
Peru	Lima	1995	611	16-17	40.0	11.0
South Africa	Transkei	1994–1995	1975	15-18	28.4	6.4
United Republic of Tanzania	Mwanza	1996	892	12-19	29.1	6.9
United States	National	1995	2042	15-24	9.1	

== Alcohol and drug consumption ==
Increased vulnerability to sexual violence also stems from the use of alcohol and other drugs. Consuming alcohol or drugs makes it more difficult for people to protect themselves by interpreting and effectively acting on warning signs. Drinking alcohol may also place a person in settings where his or her chances of encountering a potential offender are greater.

== Having previously been raped or sexually abused ==
There is some evidence linking experiences of sexual abuse in childhood or adolescence with patterns of victimization during adulthood. A national study of violence against women in the United States found that women who were raped before the age of 18 years were twice as likely to be raped as adults, compared with those who were not raped as children or adolescents (18.3% and 8.7%, respectively).

The effects of early sexual abuse may also extend to other forms of victimization and problems in adulthood. For instance, a case control study in Australia on the long-term impact of abuse reported significant associations between child sexual abuse and experiencing rape, sexual and mental health problems, domestic violence and other problems in intimate relationships even after accounting for various family background characteristics. Those who had experienced abuse involving intercourse had more negative outcomes than those suffering other types of coercion.

== Educational level ==
Women are at increased risk of sexual violence, as they are of physical violence by an intimate partner, when they become more educated and thus more empowered. Women with no education were found in a national survey in South Africa to be much less likely to experience sexual violence than those with higher levels of education. In Zimbabwe, women who were working were much more likely to report forced sex by a spouse than those who were not. The likely explanation is that greater empowerment brings with it more resistance from women to patriarchal norms, so that men may resort to violence in an attempt to regain control. The relationship between empowerment and physical violence is an n-shape with greater empowerment conferring greater risk up to a certain level, beyond which it starts to become protective. It is not known, though, whether this is also the case for sexual violence.

== Poverty ==
Poor women and girls may be more at risk of rape in the course of their daily tasks than those who are better off, for example when they walk home on their own from work late at night, or work in the fields or collect firewood alone. Children of poor women may have less parental supervision when not in school, since their mothers may be at work and unable to afford child care. The children themselves may, in fact, be working and thus vulnerable to sexual exploitation. Poverty forces many women and girls into occupations that carry a relatively high risk of sexual violence, particularly sex work. It also creates enormous pressures for them to find or maintain jobs, to pursue trading activities and, if studying, to obtain good grades, all of which render them vulnerable to sexual coercion from those who can promise these things. Poorer women are also more at risk of intimate partner violence, of which sexual violence is often a manifestation.

== LGBTQIA+ ==
Members of LGBTQIA+ communities have historically been targets of sexual violence. In many societies such as in New York, queer activism gained visibility during the 1960s and beyond in political spaces. In areas where queer visibility was more prominent, there was also more heavy policing. Due to the incarceration and criminalization of queer people brought into detention centers, a space was created where guards could sexually abuse queer individuals. Additionally, members of queer and transgender communities have experienced disproportionate rates of poverty due to a lack of job access and discrimination. Because of the lack of economic opportunity, individuals resort to jobs that involve an increased risk of sexual violence such as sex work. Sexual violence has commonly impacted members of queer communities where drug addiction and poverty may also be present due to the systemic association that correlates unemployment and low education levels with an increase in drug use.

== See also ==
- Female homicides in Ciudad Juárez
- Thordis Elva - Rape survivor who later collaborated with her assailant to author a book about the experience
