= Ellen Pence =

American sociologist and activist

Ellen Louise Pence (April 15, 1948 – January 6, 2012) was an American scholar and a social activist. She co-founded the Duluth Domestic Abuse Intervention Project, an inter-agency collaboration model used in all 50 states in the U.S. and over 17 countries. A leader in both the battered women's movement and the emerging field of institutional ethnography, she was the recipient of numerous awards including the Society for the Study of Social Problems Dorothy E. Smith Scholar Activist Award (2008) for significant contributions in a career of activist research.

== Background ==
Born in Minneapolis, Minnesota, Pence graduated from St. Scholastica in Duluth with a B.A. in arts. She was active in institutional change work for battered women since 1975, and helped found the Domestic Abuse Intervention Project in 1980.

She is credited with creating the Duluth Model of intervention in domestic violence cases, Coordinated Community Response (CCR), which uses an interagency collaborative approach involving police, probation, courts and human services in response to domestic abuse. The primary goal of CCR is to protect victims from ongoing abuse.

She earned her Ph.D. in sociology from the University of Toronto in 1996. She used institutional ethnography as a method of organizing community groups to analyze problems created by institutional intervention in families. She founded Praxis International in 1998 and was the chief author and architect of the Praxis Institutional Audit, a method of identifying, analyzing and correcting institutional failures to protect people drawn into legal and human service systems because of violence and poverty.

== Activism and research ==
Pence's focus was on legislative efforts, legal reform projects, shelter and advocacy program development, and training programs for judges, probation officers, law enforcement officers, and human service providers. Pence was the author of several educational manuals and curricula for classes for battered women, men who batter, and law enforcement officers. She co-authored two books: Educational Groups for Men Who Batter: The Duluth Model and Coordinated Community Response to Domestic Violence: Lessons from the Duluth Model.

Until late 2011 she was the executive director of Praxis International. and worked with a national team of experts to run an advocacy learning center to strengthen advocacy programs' skills and capacities in their work toward ending violence against women.

== Death ==
Pence died of breast cancer on January 6, 2012, aged 63, in St. Paul, Minnesota.
