= Drunks (film) =

1995 American film

- Directed by: Peter Cohn
- Written by: Gary Lennon
- Starring: Richard Lewis; Faye Dunaway; Spalding Gray; Amanda Plummer; Dianne Wiest
- Cinematography: Peter Hawkins
- Edited by: Hughes Winborne
- Music by: Joe Delia
- Production companies: BMG Independents; Northern Lights Entertainment
- Distributed by: Shooting Gallery Film Series
- Release date: August 23, 1995 (Boston Film Festival)
- Running time: 90 minutes
- Country: United States
- Language: English

Drunks is a 1995 American drama film starring Richard Lewis and directed by Peter Cohn.

== Plot ==
A group of alcoholics and addicts attend an Alcoholics Anonymous meeting held in a church basement in Times Square. At the beginning of the meeting, Jim (Richard Lewis), reluctantly tells the story of his drug and alcohol abuse and subsequent sobriety, but gets upset and abruptly leaves the meeting.

The movie proceeds to alternate between scenes of Jim's futile attempts to resist the temptation to drink that same night, intermixed with scenes of the remaining attendees of the meeting recounting their own struggles with addiction. Some of the meeting's attendees include Becky (Faye Dunaway), a mother who worries about the effect of her drinking on her teenage son; Rachel (Dianne Wiest), a doctor who worries that she is replacing her alcohol and pill addiction with workaholism; Louis (Spalding Gray), a man who claims he came to the AA meeting in error, thinking it was choir practice; Shelly (Amanda Plummer), a neurotic woman dealing with a domineering mother; Debbie (Parker Posey), a party girl who idolizes Janis Joplin and has replaced her alcoholism with an addiction to football; Marty (George Martin), a clergyman and the meeting's chairperson; Joseph (Howard Rollins), a man who lost his marriage and nearly lost his son due to a drunk driving crash; Brenda (LisaGay Hamilton), an HIV-positive former heroin addict.

== Cast ==
- Richard Lewis as Jim
- Faye Dunaway as Becky
- Dianne Wiest as Rachel
- Spalding Gray as Louis
- Amanda Plummer as Shelly
- Parker Posey as Debbie
- George Martin as Marty
- Howard Rollins as Joseph
- Lisa Gay Hamilton as Brenda
- Christopher Lawford as Rich
- Sam Rockwell as Tony
- Calista Flockhart as Helen
- Anna Thomson as Tanya
- Liam Ahern as Billy
- Kevin Corrigan as Cam
- Julie Halston as Carol
- Oscar Koch as Dennis
- Zach Grenier as Al
- Margaret Devine as Terry

== Production ==
The film marked Peter Cohn's directorial debut and Richard Lewis's first dramatic role as an actor. Cohn is the son of the famed talent agent Sam Cohn of ICM, who helped his son in getting client Dianne Wiest to join the film's cast.

The screenplay was written by Gary Lennon and was adapted from a play he wrote called Blackout. In the original screenplay, Jim's character was of Irish descent, but his backstory was changed to make the character Jewish in order to better suit actor Richard Lewis, who is himself Jewish. The film's budget was small, reportedly under $500,000, with the cast working for scale. Many of the characters' monologues were improvised and filmed in one take.

According to the Austin American-Statesman, Drunks was the last feature film to have been shot in Times Square prior to the intersection's redevelopment in the 1990s under the mayorship of Rudy Giuliani.

== Release ==
The film had its premiere at the Boston Film Festival on August 23, 1995. It was shown on Showtime on November 10, 1995. The film saw a wider theatrical release in the US and Canada in 1997.

== Critical reception ==
Reception of the film was mostly positive overall, particularly the individual performances of many of the actors, including comedian Richard Lewis's first appearance in a dramatic role. At the same time, some were critical of the dramatic elements of the film.

Jay Carr of The Boston Globe wrote: "Drunks isn't afraid to make its characters seem like people you'd run into on the subway. Most of the notes it strikes are convincing. We'll be hearing more from Cohn."

Gary Kamiya of the San Francisco Examiner wrote: "There's enormous drama in the stories told by the recovering alcoholics in this movie, but very little drama – except melodrama – in the movie itself," but also added, "Still Drunks is worth seeing for its exceptional acting and the empathy it brings to the damaged lives of its courageous characters."

Carrie Rickey of The Philadelphia Inquirer wrote: "Lewis, who resembles a debauched Al Pacino (if that's not redundant), is impressive in a dramatic turn. Likewise Wiest, Rollins and Posey, and likewise Spalding Gray... Yet while each character's confession is profoundly moving, Drunks finally lacks the cumulative impact we expect in a drama. Like a war movie in which an element of suspense is which character will be killed, the only element of suspense in Drunks is which character will backslide."

Stephen Holden of The New York Times wrote: "Although Drunks...has its moments of staginess, the actors' understated characterizations go a long way toward keeping the movie from turning into a series of speeches. Mr. Lewis is especially impressive in the way he takes a role that many actors would be tempted to shout to the rafters and lets his panicky wide eyes convey the character's desperation."

Susan Kirr of the Austin American-Statesman wrote: "While the monologues (many of them improvised and shot in one long take) are often pointed and touching, others fall flat, showing the mechanism unfolding clumsily. After several of these confessions, the film starts to resemble A Chorus Line, as one painful story after another is contrasted with an all-out attempt to break through and succeed."

Kevin Thomas of The Los Angeles Times wrote: "Allowing for a certain theatricality, Drunks is totally persuasive in its account of recovering alcoholics helping one another in a painful and often desperate struggle for sobriety. Although Drunks is an ensemble endeavor sprinkled with distinguished names, comedian Richard Lewis, in his first leading dramatic role, is undeniably its star and a commanding one at that."
