= Rape Culture (film) =

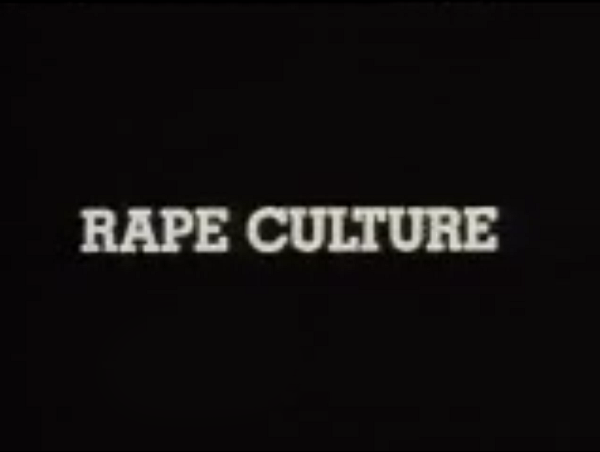
- Opening title
- Produced by: Margaret Lazarus; Renner Wunderlich
- Production company: Cambridge Documentary Films
- Release date: 1975

Rape Culture is a 1975 film by Cambridge Documentary Films, produced by Margaret Lazarus and Renner Wunderlich. It was updated in 1983.

In January 1975, Judy Norsigan outlined how the film illustrated "rape culture", through the voices of men and women, including rapists, victims, prisoners, rape crisis workers, and the media.

The film featured prisoners of Lorton Reformatory, Virginia, "Prisoners Against Rape Inc" (PAR), a not-for-profit organization founded by William Fuller and Larry Cannon on September 9, 1973, in conjunction with women fighting rape. The prison administration "approved" self-help status.

PAR was set up after Fuller wrote to the DC Rape Crisis Center in 1973 and asked for assistance. The DC Rape Crisis Center had opened in 1972 in response to the high incidence of rape against women of color. Fuller acknowledged his history of rape, murder, and prison rape. He wanted to stop being a rapist. This resulted in a cooperative effort.

The women from the DC Rape Crisis Center who initiated work with PAR were Loretta Ross, Yulanda Ward and Nkenge Touré. Ross has said that whilst the relationship was seen initially as controversial, it was one of the more interesting aspects of her work at the DC Rape Crisis Center in the 1970s and 80s. In an interview with Joyce Follet, Ross observed that in the work of the DC Rape Crisis Center they could bandage up women all they wanted to, but if they did not stop rape what was the point? Margaret Lazarus, the film's producer, said of this relationship that the work was "groundbreaking".

The film featured Mary Daly, radical feminist philosopher, academic, and theologian, and Author and Artist Emily Culpepper. They discussed rapism as an intellectual concept, and phallocentric morality and "its 'unholy trinity of rape, genocide and war.'".

Doreen McDowell, a rape victim, talked of her experience, how sex fantasies play a part in rape, and how male identified behavior in women maintained a "state of siege". statistical evidence, refuting rape myths, law enforcement and legislative views of rape were presented by Joanna Morris, author and statistical coordinator for rape crisis centers across the USA.

The film also looked closely at the mass media, how filmmakers, songwriters, writers and magazines perpetuated the attitudes to rape, which accepted it and even perpetuated rape myths and stereotypical behavior around rape. Gone with the Wind, Alfred Hitchcock's film Frenzy, and Hustler magazine were some of the media used to illustrate the acceptance of rape.

In describing the film, the producers say that it attempts to give real and accurate limits to rape and expand society's narrow and sexist concepts of rape.

Lazarus has said of the film's title that it came from long discussion about what the film was trying to illustrate. She has also expressed the view that the film is the first time "rape culture" was used in its widest accepted sense. A mention of the film in the Congressional Record in January 1978 is the first known occurrence of the term 'rape culture' in national-level American politics.

== See also ==
- Rape culture
- Duma (2011 film)
