= Richard Felson =

- Born: October 10, 1950 (age 75); Cincinnati, Ohio, United States
- Occupations: Professor of Crime Law and Justice and Sociology The Pennsylvania State University
- Known for: Sociology
- Scientific career
- Workplaces: The Pennsylvania State University

Richard Felson (born 10 October 1950, in Cincinnati) is a professor of Crime, Law, and Justice and Sociology at The Pennsylvania State University. He is also adjunct professor of Sociology at State University of New York at Albany.

== Research on Aggression and Coercive Actions ==
In 1994 Felson co-authored the controversial book "Violence, Aggression and Coercive Actions: A Social-Interactionist Perspective" with James Tedeschi. This book challenged the theory that rape was a crime motivated by an aggressive desire to dominate the victim. Felson and Tedeschi argued that sexual fulfillment was a motive of rapists.

This book drew widespread criticism from academic circles. Robert Prentky the clinical director of Philadelphia's Joseph J. Peters Institute argued that in a small number of cases sexual fulfillment was the motive. However the overriding motive was dominance of the victim. Felson has stated that he believes rape is a terrible crime and that the motive does not excuse the actions of the perpetrator.

Felson has written about intimate partner violence as well as sexual assault in his book "Violence and Gender Reexamined." In this book he argues that one gains a better understanding of violence against women by comparing it to violence against men.

Most of Felson's research is concerned with other aspects of violence. He has studied, for example, the role of alcohol and drugs, the role of guns, and race and regional differences.

In 2012, Felson was selected to deliver the annual Bruce Mayhew Lecture at the University of South Carolina. His lecture is entitled "Sexual Assault as a Crime Against Teenagers."
