= I Am a Promise: The Children of Stanton Elementary School =

I Am a Promise
- Directed by: Susan Raymond
- Produced by: Alan Raymond; Susan Raymond
- Cinematography: Alan Raymond
- Music by: Tom Verlaine
- Production company: Video Verite Films
- Distributed by: HBO
- Release date: 1993
- Running time: 88 minutes
- Country: United States
- Language: English

I Am a Promise: The Children of Stanton Elementary School is a 1993 American documentary film about the pupils at Stanton Elementary School, an inner city school in Philadelphia. It was aired on HBO as part of its America Undercover series.

== Accolades ==
The film won the Academy Award for Best Documentary Feature for producers Alan and Susan Raymond. It also was the recipient of the Primetime Emmy Award for Best Informational Special and a 1995 Alfred I. duPont–Columbia University Award

== Production ==
The husband and wife documentarians were also the cinematographer and editor (Alan) as well as director and narrator (Susan) for the film.

== See also ==
- The Police Tapes (1977)
- The War Room - D.A. Pennebaker documentary nominated alongside I Am a Promise for same Oscar category
