= Power and Control: Domestic Violence in America =

- Directed by: Peter Cohn
- Produced by: Peter Cohn
- Cinematography: Dominic Howes
- Edited by: Dara Kell; Thavisouk Phrasavath
- Music by: Rick Baitz
- Release date: April 18, 2010 (St. Paul International Film Festival)
- Running time: 51 minutes
- Country: United States
- Language: English

Power and Control: Domestic Violence in America is a documentary film released in 2010 that depicts the issue of domestic violence in the U.S. as told through the personal story of Kim Mosher, a mother of three from Wabasha, Minnesota, and victim of physical and emotional abuse. Finally leaving her husband in 2008 and facing an uncertain future, she succeeds in re-building much of her life, seeking refuge at a women's shelter and forming deep friendships with other victims.

Detailing the problems dealt with by the multi-disciplinary anti-abuse effort known as the "Duluth model", it has received a variety of supportive critical reviews from publications such as the City Pages and The Minnesota Post.

== Background and film contents ==
The film looks at the story of Kim Mosher and her suffering at the hands of both physical and emotional abuse. The Wabasha, Minnesota, mother wanted to keep her ten-year marriage and family together, yet, once her husband began to physically abuse their children as well, she left her home with her children in 2008 for the Safe Haven battered women's shelter in Duluth where she began to build a new life for them as well as her. The film shows her struggles as she searches for a job, seeks child care services, looks out for affordable housing, and otherwise attempts to raise her children safely.

The documentary specifically explores the Domestic Abuse Intervention Project, often called the 'Duluth model', which was the first multi-disciplinary program designed to coordinate the actions of a variety of agencies in Duluth, Minnesota, dealing with domestic violence for a more effective outcome. This organizational effort has become a test case looked at for programs in many other U.S. jurisdictions. A nationwide study published in 2002, sponsored by the federal government, found that batterers who complete programs based on the model are less likely to repeat acts of domestic violence than those who do not complete any batterers intervention program.

== Reception ==
The movie made its world premiere at the Minneapolis-St. Paul International Film Festival in April 2010. Upon wide release, it has received critical praise from several publications. For example, City Pages writer Ira Booker found the film a "stark reminder that this kind of violence is all around us." The Minnesota Post ran an article referring to it as "a purely harrowing story" and "highly recommended.” As well, the Buffalo, New York web-project Educational Media Reviews Online endorsed the film.

== See also ==
- Domestic Violence Documentaries
- Abusive power and control
- Epidemiology of domestic violence
- The Conspiracy of Silence, a Public Broadcasting Station (PBS) documentary
- Defending Our Lives, a short documentary
- Silent Voices, a United Kingdom documentary
- Sin by Silence, a documentary
