= Massachusetts Correctional Institution – Framingham =

Prison in Framingham, Massachusetts

Coordinates: 42°16′01.34″N 71°24′25.22″W

Massachusetts Correctional Institution- Framingham
- Interactive map of Massachusetts Correctional Institution- Framingham
- Location: Framingham, Massachusetts
- Status: Operational
- Security class: Medium/ Awaiting Trial Unit-Maximum
- Capacity: Operational Capacity: 572 Operational Occupancy: 30%
- Opened: 1877
- Managed by: Massachusetts Department of Correction
- Director: Superintendent Ryan Donlon

Massachusetts Correctional Institution – Framingham (MCI-Framingham) is the Massachusetts Department of Correction's institution for female offenders. It is located in Framingham, Massachusetts, a city located midway between Worcester and Boston. The prison was once known as "Framingham State Prison". However, MCI-Framingham is its official name and is favored. As of May 2022 there are approximately 190 inmates in general population beds.

== History ==
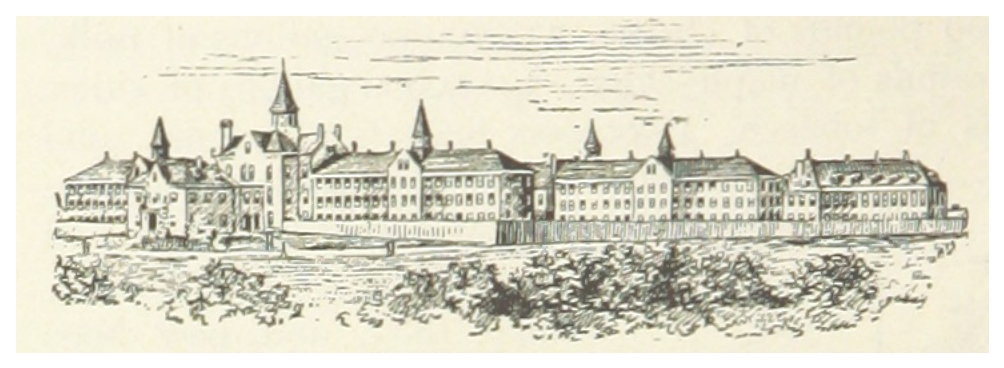
Sherborn Reformatory Prison for Women

MCI-Framingham was proposed in 1872 as a reform to incarcerate women and men in different prisons in Massachusetts. The prison opened in 1877 and was the second prison for women opened in the U.S. Several references note it as the oldest female correctional institution (of those still in operation) in the United States. Its original name was the Sherborn Reformatory for Women, because at the time of its establishment it was located in that town. In 1924, the town of Framingham acquired 565 acres in Sherborn, including the prison and its grounds.

=== Prison Reform ===
MCI-Framingham has been the site of many reform efforts throughout its history. The reformatory aimed to engage incarcerated people in work and other productive activities as a form of rehabilitation. The women worked a large farm and in later years work transitioned other trades and manufacturing including flag-making. Visitors came to learn from the practices of the reformatory and its leaders. The prison also employed female guards and physicians, and included both men and women among its board of visitors.

In 1973 the Department of Correction moved some incarcerated men from other prisons to MCI-Framingham in a pilot program for incarcerating men and women together in the same prison. This program lasted until the early 1980s before the prison returned to exclusively incarcerating people designated as women. The goal of this pilot was to try to reduce incidence of same-sex relationships among incarcerated people and to create an environment more similar to life outside of prison.

Several of its superintendents were well-known prison reformers including Ellen Cheney Johnson (1884–1899), Jessie Donaldson Hodder (1911–1932), and Miriam Van Waters (1932–1957). The prison's best-known superintendent, however, was Clara Barton, who served for eight months during a leave from her work with the Red Cross.

=== Notable people ===
Among the women who served time at Framingham were the 19th century bandits from the Oklahoma Territory known as Little Britches and Cattle Annie, depicted in the 1981 film, Cattle Annie and Little Britches. Bettine Masserelli was the first woman in Massachusetts to be convicted of armed robbery. The Framingham Eight met while incarcerated at Framingham in the 1990s. British au pair Louise Woodward was held at Framingham for 279 days in 1997 during her much publicized trial at the end of which she was sentenced to time served and was released.

== Covid cases ==
Pursuant to the Supreme Judicial Court’s April 3, 2020 Opinion and Order in the Committee for Public Counsel Services v. Chief Justice of the Trial Court, SJC-12926 matter, as amended on April 10, April 28 and June 23, 2020 (the “Order”), the Special Master posts weekly reports which are located on the SJC website here for COVID testing and cases for each of the correctional facilities administered by the Department of Correction and each of the county Sheriffs’ offices. The SJC Special master link above has the most up to date information reported by the correctional agencies and is posted for the public to view.

== MCI-Framingham today ==
MCI-Framingham is currently a medium-security correctional facility for female offenders. The prison houses both state and county offenders, as well as those awaiting sentencing. There are prisoners of a variety of classification levels. Sixty-three percent of the inmates are there for non-violent offenses, most often involving drugs.
