= Renner Wunderlich =

American documentary filmmaker

Renner Wunderlich (born May 5, 1947) is an American film producer/film director known for his work in documentary film. He and his partner, Margaret Lazarus, received an Oscar in 1993 for their documentary Defending Our Lives about the Framingham Eight, battered women who were in prison for killing their abusers. Renner Wunderlich was born in St Louis Missouri, son of a Navy captain and an employee of National Geographic Society. He was born in St. Louis, Missouri to Erlynne Renner Wunderlich and Harry Joseph Wunderlich. He graduated from Boston College and has a Masters in Social Work.

He is an independent licensed social worker with a specialty in the mental health needs of creative clients in the arts and those of veterans. He has worked with homeless veterans, returning veterans from the Iran and Afghanistan wars, wounded veterans including those with post traumatic stress and substance abuse. He worked at the Veterans Administration and US Army Wounded Warrior Program, and was a member of the Massachusetts Governors Council on Veterans Affairs.

In 1974, he co-founded with Margaret Lazarus the non-profit organization, Cambridge Documentary Films, and to date has produced and directed many films about social justice and women's issues: Including films on rape, Rape is and Rape culture, films on body image and media culture, BirthMarkings, Killing Us Softly, and Still Killing Us Softly, and films on labor history, Eugene Debs and the American Movement. In addition to the Academy Award, his films have won numerous awards and prizes, and have been screened at many of the major film festivals around the world and in the United Nations General Assembly, the White House, the Office of the Vice President, the US Senate and House of Representatives. He worked for twenty years as a freelance editor, sound and cameraman for the majors networks, public television and educational institutions. He is a private pilot who built and flew his own aircraft.

== Filmography ==
- 1970 "A Question of Values"
- 1972 "Mr. Goodman"
- 1974 “Taking Our Bodies Back: The Women’s Health Movement”
- 1975 “Rape Culture”
- 1977 “Eugene Debs and the American Movement”
- 1979 “Killing Us Softly”
- 1981 “Calling the Shots: Advertising Alcohol”
- 1982 “Pink Triangles: A film about Homophobia”
- 1984 “Hazardous Inheritance: Workplace Hazards to Reproductive Health”
- 1986 “Last Empire: US Intervention”
- 1987 “Still Killing Us Softly”
- 1988 “Not Just a Job”
- 1989 “Advertising Alcohol”
- 1991 “Life’s Work”
- 1993 “Defending Our Lives”
- 1998 “Strong at the Broken Places”
- 1999 “Women’s Rights, Human Rights”
- 2000 “Beyond Killing Us Softly”
- 2001 “The Strength to Resist: Media’s Impact on Women and Girls”
- 2003 “Rape Is”
- 2005 “Healing the Wounds" (producer only)
- 2010 “BirthMarkings” (producer only)
