= Cambridge Documentary Films =

Cambridge Documentary Films is a non profit organization established in Massachusetts in 1974. The purpose of the organization is to create new perspectives on important social issues and give voice to groups and individuals whose perspectives are ignored by mainstream media. Cambridge Documentary Films produces and distributes award-winning documentaries to thousands of universities, community organizations, schools, libraries and public interest organizations throughout the United States and the world. These films have won numerous awards, including an Academy Award and have been screened at the UN General Assembly, The White House, the Office of the Vice President, the US Congress and numerous state houses. The subjects include: advertising's image of women, domestic violence, trauma, rape, eating disorders, self-esteem, media literacy, homophobia, the labor movement, gender roles, career counseling, nuclear war, reproductive health hazards, the women's health movement, gay and lesbian parenting and other social issues.

== Cambridge Documentary Film titles ==
- 1974 - Taking Our Bodies Back: The Women’s Health Movement
- 1975 - Rape Culture
- 1977 - Eugene Debs and the American Movement]
- 1979 - Killing Us Softly
- 1982 - Pink Triangles: A film about Homophobia
- 1984 - Hazardous Inheritance: Workplace Hazards to Reproductive Health
- 1986 - Last Empire: US Intervention
- 1987 - Still Killing Us Softly
- 1988 - Not Just a Job
- 1991 - Life’s Work
- 1993 - Defending Our Lives
- 1998 - Strong at the Broken Places
- 2000 - Beyond Killing Us Softly
- 2001 - The Strength to Resist: Media’s Impact on Women and Girls
- 2003 - Rape Is
- 2005 - Healing the Wounds
- 2010 - BirthMarkings
