= Margaret Lazarus =

American film producer

Margaret Lazarus (born January 22, 1949) is an American film producer and director known for her work in documentary film. She and her partner, Renner Wunderlich, received an Oscar in 1993 for their documentary Defending Our Lives about the Framingham Eight, battered women who were in prison for killing their abusers.

== Biography ==
Margaret Lazarus was born in New York City in January 1949 to Leon Lazarus, a painter, art teacher and assistant principal in the New York City schools and Paula Lazarus, an elementary school teacher and school librarian. She graduated with honors from Vassar College in 1969 and received a master's degree in Broadcasting and Film from Boston University College of Communication, and to date has produced and directed 20 films about social justice and women's issues. She began her career as a producer writer for a weekly public affairs program on the CBS affiliate in Boston.

In 1974, she co-founded with Wunderlich the non-profit organization, Cambridge Documentary Films, and to date has produced and directed 20 films about social justice and women's issues: Including films on rape, "Rape is" and "Rape Culture", a phrase which Margaret and her team were first to use publicly.

Cambridge Documentary Films has also produced films on body image and media culture, "BirthMarkings", "The Strength to Resist","Killing Us Softly", and "Still Killing Us Softly", on trauma and recovery, "Strong at the Broken Places", and films on labor history, "Eugene Debs and the American Movement". Other films include "Pink Triangles: A Film about Homophobia", "Not Just a Job", "Strong at the Broken Places", "Women's Rights, Human Rights", and "Healing the Wounds".

In addition to the Academy Award, her films have won numerous awards and prizes and have been screened at festivals throughout the world, such as London, Melbourne, Chicago, Denver, Leipzig, Edinburgh, Seattle, Washington DC, Vancouver, FullFrame/DoubleTake, and many other . She is currently the Executive Director of Cambridge Documentary Films. Her films about rape, domestic violence and body image are some of the most widely distributed short documentaries in the United States.

Throughout her career she has combined documentary filmmaking and political activism. In 1999 she produced and directed a series of short films on women, violence and human rights for UNIFEM, which were screened at the UN General Assembly. She is one of the co-authors of the chapter on Violence Against Women, in four of the editions of Our Bodies Ourselves.

As a Senior Fellow she taught "Producing Films for Social Change" at Tufts University from 2006 to 2009. She has served as a member of the executive committee of the documentary branch of the Academy of Motion Picture Arts and Sciences.

Her installation "Affinity" with video and live dance is scheduled to premiere at the Santa Barbara Museum of Fine Arts.

== Filmography ==
- 1974 "Taking Our Bodies Back: The Women's Health Movement"
- 1975 "Rape Culture"
- 1977 "Eugene Debs and the American Movement"
- 1979 "Killing Us Softly"
- 1981 "Calling the Shots: Advertising Alcohol"
- 1982 "Pink Triangles: A film about Homophobia"
- 1984 "Hazardous Inheritance: Workplace Hazards to Reproductive Health"
- 1986 "Last Empire: US Intervention"
- 1987 "Still Killing Us Softly"
- 1988 "Not Just a Job"
- 1989 "Advertising Alcohol"
- 1991 "Life's Work"
- 1993 "Defending Our Lives"
- 1998 "Strong at the Broken Places"
- 1999 "Women's Rights, Human Rights"
- 2000 "Beyond Killing Us Softly"
- 2001 "The Strength to Resist: Media's Impact on Women and Girls"
- 2003 "Rape Is"
- 2005 "Healing the Wounds" (producer only)
- 2010 "BirthMarkings"
- 2020 "Affinity 2020"
