= Duluth model =

Programme to reduce domestic violence against women

The Duluth model is a protocol for coordinated intervention of community resources against intimate partner violence (IPV). While it remains the primary means of addressing such violence in many American states, the evidence about its effectiveness is mixed. Although it seems to decrease physical and verbal aggression, some legal, social, and academic critics consider it less effective compared to other protocols, or biased because it incorrectly categorically rejects women's violence, violence within same-sex relationships, and bidirectional abuse. Academics have argued that it is an extreme, negative, and polarized model.

The Domestic Abuse Intervention Project (DAIP) devised the protocol to bring law enforcement, family law, and social work agencies together in a "Coordinated Community Response" ("CCR") to purportedly reduce violence against women and rehabilitate perpetrators of domestic violence. The DAIP developed the curriculum in Duluth, Minnesota, hence its name. The model describes coordinating community agencies to provide a consistent response to female victims of Intimate Partner Violence that has three primary goals:

1. Ensuring survivor safety.
2. Providing a way to hold offenders/abusive partners accountable for their violence.
3. Changing the climate of tolerance for this form of violence.

Part of this model is the men's behavior change program Creating a Process of Change for Men who Batter: The Duluth Curriculum. The curriculum is the most common batterer intervention program used in the United States. Advocates of the Duluth model claim it is successful because it is grounded in the experience of female victims, helps offenders and society change, and pulls the whole community together to respond.

The Duluth Model Coordinated Community Response has received multiple awards for its grassroots efforts to end intimate partner violence, including the World Future Council's Future Policy Award in 2014. It has been criticized by mental health professionals who focus on individual behaviour and reject a social model of battering. Edward Gondolf critiques the narrow forms of evidence used to evaluate interventions, arguing that the biomedical research model is inappropriate for evaluating the effectiveness of psychosocial interventions.

== Origin and theory ==
The feminist theory underlying the Duluth model is that men use violence within relationships to exercise abusive power and control. The curriculum "is designed to be used within a community using its institutions to diminish the power of batterers over their victims and to explore with each abusive man the intent and source of his violence and the possibilities for change through seeking a different kind of relationship with women”. This is illustrated by the "Power and Control Wheel," a graphic typically displayed as a poster in participating locations. According to the Duluth model, "women and children are vulnerable to violence because of their unequal social, economic, and political status in society." Treatment of abusive men is focused on re-education, as "we do not see men’s violence against women as stemming from individual pathology, but rather from a socially reinforced sense of entitlement."

The program's philosophy is intended to help batterers work to change their attitudes and personal behavior so they would learn to be nonviolent in any relationship. The Domestic Abuse Intervention Project was the first multi-agency program designed to address the issue of domestic violence. This experimental program, conducted in Duluth in 1981, coordinated the actions of a variety of agencies dealing with domestic conflict. The Duluth model curriculum was developed by a "small group of activists in the battered women’s movement", with five battered women and four men as subjects. The program has become a model for programs in other jurisdictions seeking to deal more effectively with domestic violence.

== Effectiveness ==
An early U.S. government sponsored study found that batterers who complete programs based on the Duluth Model are less likely to repeat acts of domestic violence than those who do not complete any batterers' intervention program. A 2003 study conducted by the U.S. National Institute of Justice found the Duluth Model to have "little or no effect". This study had considerable shortfalls, and the National Institute of Justice said in its introduction that "response rates were low, many people dropped out of the program, and victims could not be found for subsequent interviews. The tests used to measure batterers' attitudes toward domestic violence and their likelihood to engage in future abuse were of questionable validity."

A 2003 longitudinal, four-year evaluation by E. W. Gondolf, covering four cities, shows clear deescalation of reassault and other abuse, with 80% of men reaching sustained non-violence. A 2005 study led by Larry Bennett, a professor of social work at the University of Illinois at Chicago and an expert on batterer intervention programs, found that of the 30 batterer intervention programs in Cook County, Illinois, 15 percent of batterers who completed the programs were rearrested for domestic violence, compared with 37 percent of those who dropped out of the programs. Bennett said the studies are largely meaningless because they lacked a proper control group. He added that participants who complete domestic violence programs are likely to be more motivated than others to improve behavior and would be less inclined to offend again.

A 2011 review of the effectiveness of batterers intervention programs (BIP), primarily the Duluth model, found that "there is no solid empirical evidence for either the effectiveness or relative superiority of any of the current group interventions," and that "the more rigorous the methodology of evaluation studies, the less encouraging their findings." That is, as BIPs in general, and Duluth model programs in particular are subject to increasingly rigorous review, their success rate approaches zero. A 2014 news report reported zero percent recidivism within five years for a batterers intervention program based on Nonviolent Communication, and contrasted this with a recidivism rate of 40 percent within five years for a batterers intervention program based on the Duluth model as reported by the Domestic Abuse Intervention Project.

== Criticism ==
Criticism of the Duluth model has centered on the program's sexist insistence that men are perpetrators who are violent because they have been socialized in a patriarchy that condones male violence, and that women are victims who are violent only in self-defense. Some critics argue that "programs based on the Duluth Model may ignore research linking domestic violence to substance abuse and psychological problems, such as attachment disorders, traced to childhood abuse or neglect, or the absence of a history of adequate socialization and training."

Others criticize the Duluth model as being overly confrontational rather than therapeutic, focusing solely on changing the abuser's actions and attitudes rather than dealing with underlying emotional and psychological issues. Donald Dutton, a psychology professor at the University of British Columbia who has studied abusive personalities, states: "The Duluth Model was developed by people who didn't understand anything about therapy." Dutton also observes that "lesbian battering is more frequent than heterosexual battering". Philip W. Cook comments that in the case of homosexual domestic violence, the patriarchy is absent: there is no male dominance of women in same-sex relationships, and in fact female on female abuse is reported more than twice as frequently as male on male abuse. Furthermore, some critics argue that the model ignores the reality that women can be the perpetrators of domestic violence in heterosexual relationships. Its proponents counter that the Duluth model is effective and makes best use of scarce resources. Ellen Pence, co-founder of the DAIP, writes:

By determining that the need or desire for power was the motivating force behind battering, we created a conceptual framework that, in fact, did not fit the lived experience of many of the men and women we were working with. The DAIP staff ... remained undaunted by the difference in our theory and the actual experiences of those we were working with ... It was the cases themselves that created the chink in each of our theoretical suits of armor. Speaking for myself, I found that many of the men I interviewed did not seem to articulate a desire for power over their partner. Although I relentlessly took every opportunity to point out to men in the groups that they were so motivated and merely in denial, the fact that few men ever articulated such a desire went unnoticed by me and many of my coworkers. Eventually, we realized that we were finding what we had already predetermined to find.

The Duluth model is featured in the documentary Power and Control: Domestic Violence in America with commentary from its authors, as well as its main critics, such as Dutton.

== See also ==
- Abusive power and control
- Outline of domestic violence
- Rape shield law
- Relationship counseling
- Relationship education
- Violence Against Women Act
