= Noreen (given name) =

Noreen is an Irish given name, anglicised from Nóirín. It is also an Arabic name with the forms Nourine, Noureen, and Noorin. Another spelling is Norene, Norine and Norinne. Notable people with the given name include:

- Nourine Abouseada (born 1996), Egyptian singer and actor
- Noreen Ackland (1921–2013), British film editor
- Noreen Sher Akbar, Pakistani applied mathematician
- Norene Arnold (1927–1987), American player in the All-American Girls Professional Baseball League
- Noreen Branson (1910–2003), British communist historian and activist
- Noreen Coen (born 1993), Irish camogie player
- Noreen Connell (born 1947), American feminist organizer, writer and editor
- Noreen Corcoran (1943–2016), American actress, dancer and singer
- Noreen Culhane (born 1950), American businesswoman
- Noureen DeWulf, American actress and comedian
- Noreen Evans (born 1955), American lawyer and politician
- Norene Forbes (1914–2004), American swimmer
- Norene Gilletz (1940–2020), Canadian Jewish cookbook writer, food consultant and food writer
- Noreen Goldman, American social scientist
- Noreen Green, American conductor and educator
- Noreen Hay (born 1951), Australian politician
- Noreen A. Hynes, American infectious disease physician
- Noreen Kershaw (born 1950), British actress and director
- Noreen Kokoruda (1947–2022), American politician
- Noreen Masud, British writer and literary scholar
- Noreen Morioka (born 1965), American graphic designer
- Noreen Motamed (born 1967), Iranian-American artist and painter
- Noreen Murray (1935–2011), English molecular geneticist
- Noreen Nash (1924–2023), American actress
- Noreen Oliver (born 1960), British businesswoman
- Noreen Riols (1926–2025), British novelist
- Noorin Shereef, Indian actress
- Noreen Stevens (born 1962), Canadian cartoonist
- Noreen Young (1939–2025), Canadian puppeteer and puppet builder

== See also ==
- Noreen (surname)
- Noorin TV, a former Afghan TV network
