= Noreen =

Noreen may refer to:

- Noreen (given name)
- Noreen (surname)
- Noreen (cipher machine), used in the UK and Canada from the 1960s to 1990
- Noreen, original name of a wooden trawler acquired by the United States Navy as USS Heath Hen for World War II

== See also ==
- Norene, Tennessee, United States, an unincorporated community
