= Rape culture =

Society in which rape is pervasive and normalised

Reported rape statistics according to UNODC, 2025

Composite index about rape of women in 2018 according to WomanStats Project

Rape culture is a setting, as described by some sociological theories, in which rape is pervasive and normalized due to that setting's attitudes about gender and sexuality. Behaviors commonly associated with rape culture include victim blaming, slut-shaming, sexual objectification, trivialization of rape, denial of widespread rape, refusal to acknowledge the harm caused by sexual violence, or some combination of these. It has been used to describe and explain behavior within social groups, including prison rape and in conflict areas where war rape is used as psychological warfare. Entire societies have been alleged to be rape cultures.

The notion of rape culture was developed by second-wave feminists, primarily in the United States, beginning in the 1960s. Critics of the concept dispute its existence or extent, arguing that the concept is too narrow or that although there are cultures where rape is pervasive, the very idea of rape culture can imply that it is not only the rapist who is at fault, but also society as a whole that enables rape. Critics of that line of criticism have disputed the notion that only one party needs to be at fault, noting that the perpetrator can be the primary wrongdoer, those who help cover it up or harass the victim acting as accomplices, and that thus, also according to them, the wider society and culture can still be blamed for its collective influence on these individuals.

Two movements have addressed what they either fully or partially perceive as being rape culture or a role being played by rape culture, i.e. SlutWalk and Me Too. Though their rationale for claiming and including that the role of rape culture as being party to the particular social blights and crimes that they are fighting can vary, these movements have helped spread people's stories through hashtags and provide an online space where victims of different types of sexual violence can confide in each other.

== Origins and usage ==
The term "rape culture" was first used in the 1970s by second-wave feminists in the United States and applied to contemporary American culture as a whole. During the 1970s, feminists had begun to engage in consciousness-raising efforts designed to educate the public about the prevalence of rape. Previously, according to Canadian psychology professor Alexandra Rutherford, most Americans assumed that rape, incest, and wife-beating were rare. The concept of rape culture posited that rape was common and normal in American culture and that it was an extreme manifestation of pervasive societal misogyny and sexism. Rape was redefined as a violent crime rather than a sex crime, and its motive redefined from desire for sexual pleasure to male domination, intimidation and control. Rape also began to be reexamined through the eyes of the victims rather than the perpetrators.

The first published use of the term appears to have been in 1974 in Rape: The First Sourcebook for Women, edited by Noreen Connell and Cassandra Wilson as a project of New York Radical Feminists. In the book, the group wrote, "our ultimate goal is to eliminate rape and that goal cannot be achieved without a revolutionary transformation of our society". This book and Susan Brownmiller's 1975 Against Our Will: Men, Women and Rape were among the earliest to include first-person accounts of rape. Their authors intended to demonstrate that rape was much more common than previously believed. In the book, Brownmiller comments that women never talk about rape because they do not want to be open about a "crime against their physical integrity", which explains public ignorance of rape's prevalence. Brownmiller, a member of the New York Radical Feminists, argued that both academia and the public ignore incidents of rape. She helped psychologists begin observing and studying what sparked this "rape supportive culture". Against Our Will is considered a landmark work on feminism and sexual violence and one of the pillars of modern rape studies.

Sociology professor Joyce E. Williams traces the first usage of the term "rape culture" to the documentary film Rape Culture, released in 1975. Produced and directed by Margaret Lazarus and Renner Wunderlich for Cambridge Documentary Films, the film, Williams said, "takes credit for first defining the concept". The film discusses rape of both men and women in the context of a larger cultural normalization of rape. The film featured the work of the DC Rape Crisis Center in cooperation with Prisoners Against Rape, Inc., and includes interviews with rapists and victims, as well as prominent anti-rape activists such as feminist philosopher and theologian Mary Daly and author and artist Emily Culpepper. The film explored how mass media and popular culture have perpetuated attitudes toward rape.

In their 1992 Journal of Social Issues paper "A Feminist Redefinition of Rape and Sexual Assault: Historical Foundations and Change", Patricia Donat and John D'Emilio suggest that the term originated as "rape-supportive culture" in Against Our Will. By the mid-1970s, the phrase began to be used more widely across various media.

== Overview ==
Feminists and gender activists conceptualize rape culture as a cultural environment that encourages gender violence, as well as perpetuating rape myths, ranging from treating rape as merely "rough sex" to blaming the victim for inviting rape.

Michael Parenti believes that rape culture manifests through the acceptance of rapes as an everyday occurrence and even a male prerogative. It can be exacerbated by police apathy in handling rape cases, as well as victim blaming, reluctance by authorities to go against patriarchial cultural norms, as well as fears of stigmatization suffered by rape victims and their families. Other sociologists posit that rape culture links non-consensual sex to the cultural fabric of a society, where patriarchial worldviews, laced with misogyny and gender inequality, are passed from generation to generation, leading to widespread social and institutional acceptance of rape.

One explanation for the commonality of these myths is that only certain "bad" or "misbehaved" women are raped. This creates a category of women separated from the general population which encourages an "otherness" and reduces the idea that anyone is vulnerable to being raped. One common rape myth is that no event is random. This promotes the idea that the women who are raped were not raped for no reason, but that they deserved it. If women believe that they were the cause of the rape, they may not go to authorities. Society also uses the stereotype of men being aggressive as an excuse for their actions. This justifies and normalizes rape. Society creates these myths, scaring women before they are even raped. Another reason for the acceptance of rape culture is the "just-world" fallacy, the cognitive bias that leads some people to believe that what happens to an individual in life is inherently tied to their actions and thus seen as justly deserved. People who believe in this theory would also be more likely to believe women who are raped deserve it in some way. Finally, rape can be attributed to ways women were treated historically, as a factor used to oppress and create control over women.

Brownmiller, in Against Our Will, discusses three ideas that helped bring awareness to some clearly defined rape myths of the early to mid 20th century. First, any woman can be a rape victim regardless of age, size, shape, ethnicity, or status. Second, any man can be a rapist, not just "evil" or "mentally ill" men as thought in previous decades. Finally, rape can occur in many different forms besides the stereotype of a violent, forceful rape done by a stranger.

The idea any women could be raped was a new proposition that called attention to the notion of victim blaming. Now that rape could affect anyone, there would not be a proper way for men and women to avoid it. Some rape myths that were widely accepted on the basis of what kind of women would be raped were ideas that the victim was always "young, careless [and] beautiful" or they are "loose" women who "invite rape" by provoking men. Although Brownmiller's idea about victim blaming was supposed to expose rape myths thus eradicating victim-blaming, blaming the victim in rape circumstances is still a common practice.

Rape culture can manifest when third parties separate the sexual violence of select individuals and cast them off as deviant perverts rather than acknowledging that anyone can be capable of rape. In the 1960s, rapists were often seen as mentally ill or deviants in society, and this view persisted among some people into the 1990s.

Rape cases in which both parties previously knew one another has been coined as "acquaintance rape", a term first used in print in 1982 by feminist writer and activist Diana Russell. A book by Robin Warshaw, I Never Called It Rape was published in 1988 which provided the first in depth discussion on the subject. The term has subsequently been used by prominent academics such as Mary P. Koss.

Chris O'Sullivan asserts that acts of sexism are commonly employed to validate and rationalize normative misogynistic practices. For instance, sexist jokes may be told to foster disrespect for women and an accompanying disregard for their well-being, or a rape victim might be blamed for being raped because of how she dressed or acted. O'Sullivan examines rape culture and fraternities, identifying the socialization and social roles that contribute to sexual aggression, and looks at "frat life" and brotherhood ideals of competition and camaraderie. In these groups, sex is viewed by young men as a tool of gaining acceptance and bonding with fellow "brothers", as they engage in contests over sex with women. In O'Sullivan's article, sexualized violence towards women is regarded as part of a continuum in a society that regards women's bodies as sexually available by default.

To some, the root cause of rape culture is the "domination and objectification of women". However, academic theory holds that rape culture does not necessarily have a single cause, and causes may be localized based on other social aspects of culture. Rape culture is a fluid and always-changing entity that is socially produced and socially legitimated, so throughout time and place its definitions will change. Reasoning about rape and rape culture is also influenced by gender and heterosexuality norms. For example, in South Africa the overriding "war culture", which emphasized masculinity and violence, led to a culture in which rape was normalized. A University of California Davis public document alleged that major causes of rape were the enforcement of women having to follow social rules and the conditioning of gender roles. Others say in a rape culture women are conditioned to assume responsibility for male sexuality, and gender roles are socially constructed and enforced on women through fear.

Since the late 20th century, researchers and activists have repeatedly returned to the issue of rape culture on university campuses, especially in the United States, Canada, and the U.K. Often, victims are dissuaded from reporting sexual assaults because of universities' and colleges' ambivalent reactions to rape reports and desire to suppress bad news. Victims may not want to risk stigmatization and scrutiny in their lives, especially in campus society. Victim-hood is a social creation, and is associated with stigma. Definitions of what counts as "rape" and who is treated as a "genuine victim" are constructed in discourse and practices that reflect the social, political, and cultural conditions of society. For instance, rape victims may not be considered as such if it appears they did not struggle or put up a fight. Their emotional responses are observed and reported during investigations to aid in deciding if the victim is lying or not. In addition, college administration officials have sometimes questioned accounts of victims, further complicating documentation and policing of student assaults, despite such preventive legislation as the Clery Act, which requires colleges to report on crimes.

Rape culture is closely related to slut-shaming and victim blaming, in which rape victims are considered at fault for being raped. Scholars argue that this connection is made due to a culture that shames all female sexuality that is not for the purpose of reproduction in a hetero-normative married household. That some victims do not report rapes to the police due to fear of not being believed is often cited as a symptom of a rape culture. An analysis of American survey data from 1992 to 1994 found that 6% of women who did not report rape said it was because of fear of not being believed by police.

Victim blaming is part of a phenomenon known as 'Rape Myth Acceptance', a term coined by researcher Martha Burt in the 1980s. It is defined as "prejudicial, stereotyped or false beliefs about rape, rape victims, and rapists" which can range from trivializing rape, denial of widespread rape, labeling an accuser as a liar, stating that most rape accusations are false, refusing to acknowledge the harm caused by some forms of sexual violence, or accepting that the victim "deserved it" because she was defined as a slut. Another cause of victim blaming has been the vague understanding of what constitutes rape in the scenario of a victim wanting to have sex with the perpetrator. If a victim wants to have sex but refuses to consent to sex and the perpetrator continues, the situation would be considered rape; however, it becomes easier for others to blame the victim for the situation because he or she did "want to have sex".

Feminists frequently link rape culture to the widespread distribution of pornography, which is seen as an expression of a culture that objectifies women, reducing the female body to a commodity. Accounts of rapists often feature fusion of several pornographic motifs.

Prison rape is a topic about which jokes are abundant. Linda McFarlane, director of Just Detention International, states "Humor is part of the cultural attitude that (prison) is the one place where rape is okay."

=== Sexualization ===
Sexualization and sexual objectification are practices that contribute to the normalization of hyper-sexualized perceptions of women, which is a theme in rape culture. Hyper-sexualized or pornographic media is often attributed with perpetuating aggressive behaviors and attitudes supporting violence against women. Media depictions of violent sexual activity are also noted to increase behavioral aggression. Sexualizing imagery surfaces and reinforces misogynistic beliefs in some instances. This media can come in forms of movies, music, advertising, video games and more.

=== Victim blaming ===
Victim blaming is the phenomenon in which a victim of a crime is partially or entirely attributed as responsible for the transgressions committed against them. For instance, a victim of a crime (in this case rape or sexual assault) is asked questions by the police, in an emergency room, or in a court room that suggest that the victim was doing something, acting a certain way, or wearing clothes that may have provoked the perpetrator, therefore making the transgressions against the victim their own fault.

Victim blaming may also occur among a victim's peers, and college students have reported being ostracized if they report a rape against them, particularly if the alleged perpetrator is a popular figure or noted athlete. Also, while there is generally not much general discussion of rape facilitated in the home, schools, or government agencies, such conversations may perpetuate rape culture by focusing on techniques of "how not to be raped" (as if it were provoked), vs "how not to rape." This is problematic due to the stigma created and transgressed against the already victimized individuals rather than stigmatizing the aggressive actions of rape and the rapists. It is also commonly viewed that prisoners in prison deserve to be raped and is a reasonable form of punishment for the crimes they committed. Another factor of victim blaming involves racism and racial stereotypes. Victim blaming has serious consequences as it helps further perpetuate a pervasive rape culture. Victims who receive negative responses when disclosing sexual violence tend to experience greater distress and are therefore less likely to report future incidents if they occur.

In the UK, victim blaming is a systemic problem in many regional police forces. This is especially apparent in regard to failing to properly protect victims of 'grooming gangs'. These gangs typically repeatedly abuse and rape the same person over a prolonged period of time, and often over years. According to former detective, and child and women's safety campaigner Maggie Oliver, 'It's extremely typical to criminalise the victim. To investigate a very organised gang of perhaps 20 men is very labour-intensive. It's far easier to dismiss the victims as being drunk or as being guilty of public order offences.'

=== Slut shaming ===
Slut shaming may be considered as similar to victim blaming in that there is condemnation of someone who has been involved in a sexual event or events. The key difference is that victim blaming involves the person being condemned for being a victim who has provoked their attacker (e.g. because they wore more revealing clothing they are condemned for being coerced or physically forced into being involved in a sexual event), and slut shaming is based upon the person being condemned for their willing participation in a sexual event. Slut shaming describes the way people are made to feel guilty or inferior for certain sexual behaviors or desires that deviate from traditional or orthodox gender expectations. A study of college women from sociologists at the University of Michigan and the University of California found that slut-shaming had more to do with a woman's social class than it did with their activity. Slut shaming can create a double standard between men and women and discrimination. The SlutWalk movement aims to challenge victim blaming, slut shaming and rape culture.

== Effects ==
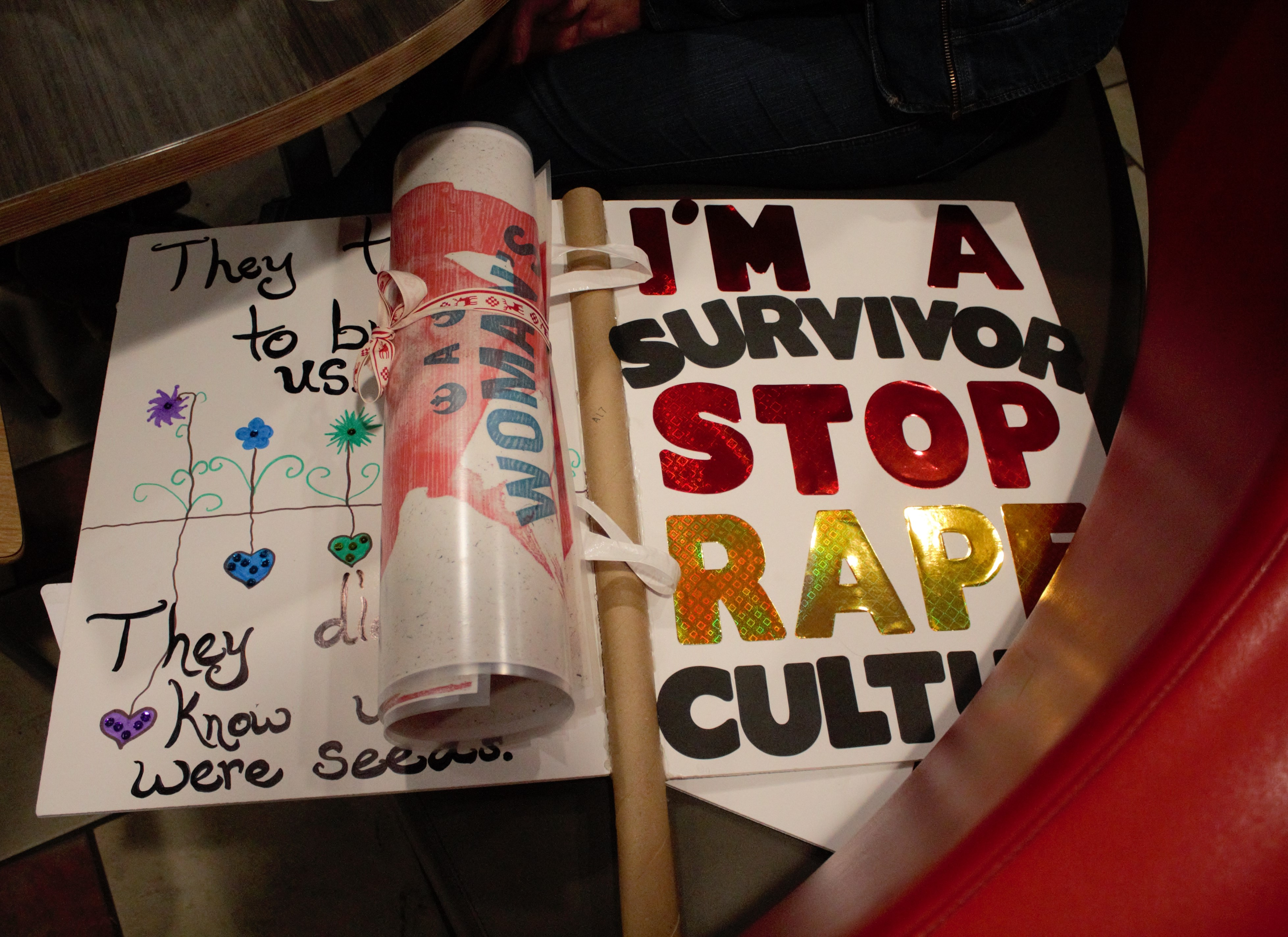
A protester's sign refers to rape culture.

Rape culture has been described as detrimental to both women and men. Some writers and speakers, such as Jackson Katz, Michael Kimmel, and Don McPherson, have said that it is intrinsically linked to gender roles that limit male self-expression and cause psychological harm to men. According to political scientist Iris Marion Young, victims in rape cultures live in fear of random acts of oppressive sexual violence that are intended to damage or humiliate the victim. Others link rape culture to modernisation and industrialisation, arguing that pre-industrial societies tend to be "rape free" cultures, since the lower status of women in these societies give them some immunity from sexual violence. In industrial rape cultures, women emerge from their homebound roles and become visible in the workplace and other areas traditionally dominated by men, increasing male insecurities that result in their using rape to suppress women.

Others also link rape culture to environmental insecurities, where men objectify women as part of their struggle to control their immediate environment. It is also linked to gender segregation, and the belief that rape proves masculinity. Other manifestations of rape culture include denial of widespread rape, institutional apathy toward the problem of rape, minimization of rape cases by government officials, and excusing rapists as social anomalies. Studies have also shown that hypermasculinity is connected to sexual assault and rape culture.

One concern is that the rape culture in the United States can influence juror decision-making in sexual assault trials. The result is that men who have committed sexual assault crimes may receive little to no punishment, which serves to strengthen the rape culture in the American judicial system and American society as a whole. In addition to the law as written not being put into effect in practice, legal definitions of rape have been criticized for placing a high burden of proof on victims to demonstrate non-consent. Individuals likely use legal definitions and jury convictions in their conceptualization of "real rape". Laws, which are passed by (mostly male) lawmakers, tend to represent dominant groups' interests. Larcombe et al. posit "a legal definition of rape as non-consensual penetration achieved through unlawful force, coercion, fraud or exploitation—that is, containing a fault element that describes the tactic the perpetrator used to effect the assault—may conform more closely to social and social science definitions of rape." In contrast, in some jurisdictions (e.g. Kentucky, Connecticut, Arkansas, Alaska, Alabama) words alone are still not sufficient to legally prove non-consent.

According to a study by Acta Obstetrecia et Gynecologica Scandinavica, of a set of "nearly 300 women who visited [a particular rape clinic]", it was found that "70 percent experienced at least 'significant' tonic immobility and 48 percent met the criteria for 'extreme' tonic immobility during the rape."

The legal process can be so traumatizing for victims that even professionals in the area would warn someone they care about against participating.

=== Effects on women ===
According to Ann Burnett, the concept of rape culture explains how society perceives and behaves toward both rape victims and perpetrators. For example, a number of rape myths are held in society, including "'no' means 'yes'"; that women can resist rape if they really wanted to; that women who are raped are promiscuous, therefore "asking to be raped"; and that many women falsely report rape to protect their own reputations or because they are angry at the accused perpetrator and want to create a type of backlash. A theory on why rape myths are so common is because they are perpetuated by norms already present in society. Researchers claim that communication and language is created by the dominant patriarchy. In positions of power, men control how women are portrayed in the media, their bodies and voices are subject to censorship, etc. which forces women to submit to the gender stereotypes formed by the dominant culture. The dominance of the male voice in society creates the concept of a "slutty woman" and forces women to monitor their own behavior in fear of how they will be perceived.

One effect rape culture has on women is their lack of understanding or a feeling of ambiguity surrounding the idea of consent and rape. Burnett's study, following college women's experiences of rape, revealed that many students could not define what the term rape really meant, did not believe consent had to be verbal and felt sexual consent was always vague and hard to pinpoint. Along with this were people believing women who had "allegedly been raped" were "asking for it" because of how they were dressed or their flirtatious behavior. Women in the study also assumed that men expected sex in exchange for drinks or dinner bought earlier for the woman. Because of their lack of awareness of what rape was and because of how they were acting/what they were wearing, women believed they had in some way provoked the rape to happen. Some women also did not report the rape if it did not fit the stereotypical definition of rape, i.e., physical injury and force committed by a stranger. When raped by someone the individual knew, women felt less inclined to label the assault as rape. They could not, therefore, report the incident or rape because they were either confused about what had happened or believed it to be their own fault.

After a rape has already occurred or after the victim acknowledged that she has been raped, women still did not report the incident because they felt it would ultimately hurt or punish them. Some reasons that women did not report their rape: they did not want to bring attention to themselves; psychologically, they did not want to have to remember what had happened to them; and they did not want people to find out or they would gain a negative reputation. Because of the existing rape myths mentioned above, women knew that reporting rape could potentially make them out to be "a slut" or "easy", and garnish a reputation that would affect how others perceived them. Many women noted that they felt that they could not even admit the rape to friends and family they trusted most, because they were so afraid of repercussions. Women felt that they would not be supported, would have their validity questioned or be blamed for the incidents that happened. As a result, rape can lessen women's trust in others and make them feel isolated.

Another effect rape culture has on young women is a victim's self-reflection. After a rape, women reported feeling dirty, thought of themselves as slutty, and believed that they had been "used" or were "damaged goods". Women felt ashamed about what had happened and felt that they no longer fit the ideal "pure and virginal" stereotype that men want. Women's belief that they were somehow rotten and that no one would want to be with them after the rape created feelings of depression and anxiety amongst victims.

If women do choose to discuss their rape with others, many still remain under scrutiny unless it is proven that they are telling the truth. Men belonging to the college study reported that they felt the rape was validated if the woman had taken the accusation to court and then won. Only then was the rape taken seriously by men. Men were also more likely to victim-blame the woman for the rape, especially if the case was not reported. Women who chose not to tell or chose to tell only people who were close to them were often deemed liars or exaggerators when others found out about the incident. Because no legal action was attempted, other parties often believed that the rape was "not a big deal" or "must not have happened". Without some kind of validation from a person in authority, rape (according to college students in the study) was believed to not be as prominent or to affect as many women as was the reality.

Although there is a wide range of research on the consequences of sexual violence on victims, there is little information on its economic effects, especially for marginalized and economically disadvantaged victims such as black and Latina women and girls. The consequences of sexual violence disproportionately harm these specific demographics, because they make up a large portion of people afflicted with income poverty and asset poverty. Simply being from one of these impoverished backgrounds increases the risk of sexual violence and discourages victims from reporting a rape crime, as there is less confidence in the police and a higher crime rate in poor areas.

=== Effects on men ===
Toxic masculinity —a concept that began to be used in the mythopoetic men's movement— is a term describing a number of negative traits and expectations burdening men in society.

Society has strict notions regarding males and how they are supposed to act. However, when males are the victims of sexual assault people often do not believe them. Many people do not believe that men can be victims, as they are often the perpetrators of sexual assault. Men are portrayed as strong, tolerant and emotionally resilient to these kinds of actions. Male victims of rape are often blamed and told that they allowed it to happen because they did not fight hard enough. This concept of how men are supposed to act has created strict notions of how men are supposed to present themselves. When men come forward and report the assault, they are often met with dismissal, and rejection by authority figures and medical practitioners. Often men have trouble when it comes to vulnerability and when men come forward with their assault, authority figures will often treat them with little respect as their masculinity has been questioned.

After a male has experienced a sexual assault, there have been many reported incidences of negative effects—such as suicidal thoughts, depressive episodes, sexual dysfunction, feelings of worthlessness, extreme anxiety and guilt—which end up putting a strain on their future relationships. This shows that females and males have similar reactions to the trauma associated with rape victims.

While sexual assault upon men by other men has been seen as mainly existing in prisons, it does not take place only among incarcerated men. Mitchell et al. (1999) presented that male rape takes place among male college students who were either forced or pressured into sexual acts. When it comes to male sexual assault, gay men are more likely to be rape victims and will not be treated as fairly as a lesbian in the judicial system. Rumney (2009) mentions how homosexuals and the gay community are at risk of becoming rape and sexual assault victims. In addition, Rumney suggests that being labeled as homosexual increases their risk of being a victim of sexual assault. When a male is sexually assaulted and labeled as homosexual it can create negative attributes and unjust treatment in the criminal justice system. Rumney also found that homosexual males are more willing to report a rape rather than heterosexual males.

Chapleau, Oswald, & Russel (2008) address how we need to break down the gender differences in rape myths and learn to accept that it happens to both sexes. When it comes to how societies function on a social and ideological basis, due to the fact that males and females experience the same negative effects of rape, we need to start addressing and breaking down rape myths. Whatley and Riggio (1993) also found that males more than females tend to blame the victim, even when victims are male.

== Prevalence ==
In sociological studies, the phrase "rape culture" is used to distinguish so-called rape-prone countries (such as the United States) from countries where rape is a relatively rare crime ("rape-free" countries). (Note: See Peggy Reeves Sanday's essay "Rape and the Silencing of the Feminine".) Rape statistics reported by law enforcement agencies can differ from estimates of sexual violence due to the dark figure of crime. While research about rape culture has been mostly conducted in developed countries, there are a number of other countries that have been described as "rape supportive" societies. These places have similarities in terms of beliefs and gender stereotyping, but there are some significant differences that explain the high rate of rape and sexual assault in these countries. Rape culture can form in some religious settings.

=== United States ===
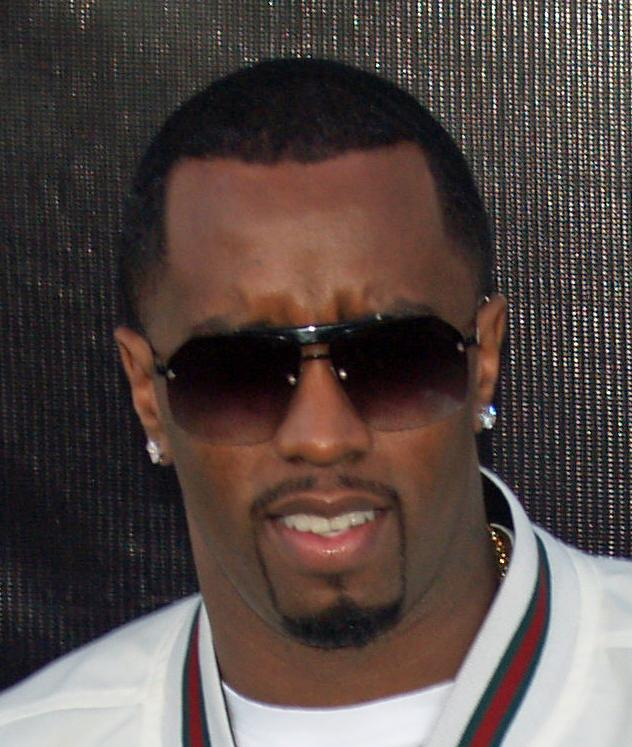
American rapper Sean "Diddy" Combs has been accused of kidnapping, drugging and coercing women into sexual activities.

Rape culture is a term that was coined in the 1970s during the second-wave feminist movement and is often used to describe contemporary American culture as a whole. In the United States, rape is a criminal offense. However, rape is one of America's most underreported crimes, with low prosecution and conviction rates compared to other violent crimes, and the societal stigma linked to it is rarely reflected in the official punishments enforced for its perpetration. Rape, Abuse & Incest National Network reports that in the United States, rape occurs every 107 seconds; 68% of those assaults are not reported, and two-thirds of them are committed by someone the victim knows (RAINN, 2014). A survey conducted between 2000 and 2013 in the United States suggests that where rape culture is prevalent in the media, there is more rape. Police get more rape reports in locations where rape culture is more popular in the media, but make fewer arrests as a result. Rape culture in the media, in turn, is most widespread during the criminal justice system's arrest and prosecution phases. Because lesser police vigilance or courtroom abuse may dissuade future victims from reporting, while increasing potential perpetrators' sense of impunity, the link between rape culture and crime is more likely to reflect an increase in rape than increased victim reporting. In reaction to the increased concern on rape culture in the United States, Steinberg and Sager (2015) write: "There is no way to inoculate our children from becoming victims or perpetrators of rape. But parents can help their children recognize and avoid the erroneous and harmful attitudes surrounding sex, power, control, and coercion.... Perhaps by doing so, we can shift the dialog and begin to create a culture that fosters healthy boundaries and ends all forms of sexual violence."

In the realm of the arts, Lady Gaga's award-nominated song, "Til It Happens to You", highlighted the existence of rape culture in the United States and around the world, and urged listeners to consider how sexual violence against women is ignored in society. The song was composed for the documentary The Hunting Ground, in which college girls from all around the country speak out about being raped on their campuses and how various officials covered up their assault. Multiple students who were sexually attacked on college campuses are featured in The Hunting Ground, who claim that college authorities either ignored them or required them to traverse a convoluted academic bureaucracy to get their allegations addressed. Many college officials were more concerned with reducing rape statistics for their institutions than with the welfare of their students, according to the film. The documentary includes interviews with college administrators who claim that they were pressured to keep rape incidents hidden. Experts interviewed by the filmmakers assert that the majority of rapes are committed by a tiny number of repeat perpetrators. According to Director Kirby Dick, less than 8% of the population is responsible for more than 90% of all sexual assaults. Producer Amy Ziering said that "our failure as a society to apprehend perpetrators leaves criminals at large who are savvy and experienced, and able to continue to commit these crimes with impunity."

=== South Africa ===
In a 2011 study conducted by Rachel Jewkes, Yandina Sikweyiya, Robert Morrell and Kristin Dunkle, men from the three districts in the Eastern Cape and KwaZulu-Natal provinces of South Africa were surveyed about rape. The prevalence among the men was high; about 1 in 4 men had raped another person, mostly young women.

Men said they had committed rape for a number of different reasons. Many raped women and young girls for "fun" or out of boredom. Gang rapes were also quite common amongst the men: about 1 in 5 men had participated in one, which reflected the society's belief that it was common and "what boys do". Drinking and peer pressure were also common reasons for raping. A majority claimed they had raped because they were punishing the women, either acquaintances or girlfriends, for having made them angry. Sub-areas and communities saw rape as a legitimate punishment for women and reasonable under certain circumstances. Some men also had sex with very young women or virgins in order to "cleanse themselves of diseases". Young women were often targeted because they were virgins and because the men believed they were easy to overpower and would not report it. Men were not afraid of repercussions.

Researchers have attempted to explain the high rate of rape in South Africa and have connected it to the traditional and cultural norms embedded within the society. Certain norms like the belief of rape myths, the inequality between men and women, and the need to express their dominance made the rape appear justified to the assailants. Many began raping when they were young teenagers for entertainment, reflecting the notion that rape is a pastime for young men and boys.

Rape and sexual violence are also prevalent in South Africa because of confusion about what is to be regarded as rape. Certain acts of sexual coercion may not be legally distinguishable. While the criminal offense of rape is condemned by the society, many rapes or sexual assaults might not be recognized as such and thus are not thought to be unacceptable behavior.

Activist Pumla Dineo Gqola says that events like the rape trial of then-Vice President and also former President of South Africa, Jacob Zuma, are not surprising and are a reflection of ideas of masculinity and femininity in contemporary South Africa. The high rate of rape in South Africa, combined with the inability of the criminal justice system and the healthcare system to contain the crisis, have been compared to a 'gender civil war'. The majority of women in South Africa are raped by people they know. It is argued that rape in democratic South Africa has become socially acceptable and maintains patriarchal order.

Corrective rape is a hate crime committed for the purpose of converting a gay person to heterosexuality. The term was first used in the early 2000s when an influx of these attacks were noted by charity workers in South Africa. This homophobic phenomenon and other ignorances perpetuate rape culture and put lesbian women at greater risk of rape. Intersectionality as a tool of analysis identifies that black lesbians face homophobia, sexism, racism and classism.

==== University ====
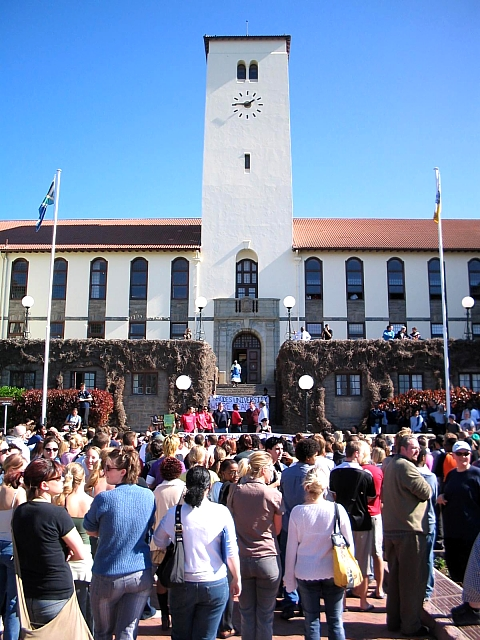
2004 anti-rape march at Rhodes University

On 17 April 2016, a list of the names of 11 men and titled 'Reference List' was posted anonymously on Facebook. The post gave no descriptions or made any allegations. However, within a matter of time, students were able to connect what these students had in common which were rape allegations. The students demanded a suspension and investigation of the individuals on the list. The police were called to intervene in order to neutralize the protests at Rhodes University. This put rape in universities in the spotlight.

==== National protest ====
On 14 February 2012, the One Billion Rising campaign was launched globally. Its aims were to raise awareness of violence against women, to inspire action for justice and to promote gender equality. The 'billion' in the campaign's title refers to the UN statistic that one in three women will be raped or beaten in their lifetime: approximately one billion women and girls. Many African countries were involved in the campaign, including the Democratic Republic of Congo, the Gambia, Kenya, Nigeria, Sudan, Somalia, South Africa, Swaziland (now Eswatini) and Zimbabwe. Often cited as one of the most dangerous places in the world to be a woman, South Africa's statistics for rape and gender-based violence galvanized thousands of South Africans to rise in support of the campaign at a range of events and through various media since the campaign's inception.

On 6 August 2016, four women staged a silent protest at the IEC results announcement ceremony. The protesters said that they could not be silent given the rape and gender-based violence in South Africa. Even though President Jacob Zuma was acquitted of the charges, the young protesters say that an acquittal does not mean the president is innocent due to the failure of the legal system.

==== Cultural values ====
Cultural values stemming from traditional practices still influence South African rape culture. Ukuthwala, also known as "wife abduction", is a traditional marriage practice in which a man kidnaps a young woman with the intent of convincing the girl and her family to agree to the marriage. Another belief, kusasa fumbi or sexual cleansing, is the idea that having sex cleans the body, specifically from illnesses. A more specific type cleaning would be virgin cleansing, which is the belief that having sex with a virgin will eliminate deadly diseases such as HIV/AIDS. Kusasa fumbi is a reflection of the indigenous medical views of the country.

=== India ===
Several scholars have described India as having a rape culture rooted in both its culture and legal system, which blames victims of rape, is sympathetic to perpetrators, and treats women who have been raped as "damaged goods" who then suffer further social discrimination afterwards. While there are laws on the books to protect victims of rape, these laws are often not enforced, especially when the perpetrator is from a more powerful caste or is wealthier than the person who was raped. There is often a failure to properly gather evidence from rape victims and to care for them afterwards, and there is little legal assistance for them.

The two main types of rape prevalent in Indian Society are political rape and honor (izzat) rape. Beyond the typical type of assault for dominance and control there exists rape for the purpose of revenge. Because women are not seen as individuals but as objects or possessions, rape is sometimes a political move to seek revenge against an enemy. Fights and feuds are settled by raping the rival's mother, wife, daughter or sister. Honor rapes are used as a tactic to take away something of value belonging to the woman, thus diminishing her width. The cultural more in India of linking a woman's celibacy with family honor compels her to safeguard her family's honor; when it comes to rape, however, instead of endeavoring to transform male-dominated and male society-constructed biased attitudes, the burden is placed on women, for example by demanding that they dress properly, or restrict their activities.

Historically in India, journalistic coverage of rape and sexual abuse has been limited and typically prejudiced against the victim. Women victims who reported rape were seen as people who do not believe in preserving the honor of their family. The victim often fights a lonely battle against her tormentor where justice is not delivered in a timely manner. The prevalence of media coverage of the 2012 Delhi gang rape case helped to draw attention to the prevalence of sexual brutality towards women in India.

According to NCRB 2015 statistics, Madhya Pradesh has the highest raw number of rape reports among Indian states, while the city of Jodhpur in Rajasthan has the highest per capita rate of reported rapes amongst cities.

=== Pakistan ===
Violence against women is seen as a private matter not believed to be "appropriate for intervention or policy changes". This is due to Pakistan's patriarchal society and gender roles that expect men to be violent and women to be fragile. Cultural norms also embrace violence and discrimination towards women, emphasizing that women would not be able to live alone without men. Normalization of violence against women continues to be reflected in the rates of rapes in Pakistan.

Rape is not often reported in Pakistan due to the inequality between the two genders. Some women do not come out because they want to uphold their family's honor. Victims of rape that are discovered might lose their families, their husbands and their homes. They think of themselves as "beghairat", a person without honor or someone who has lost self-respect, because of what has happened to them and they do not want to be stigmatized or humiliated by society. Women often feel discouraged from talking or reporting about their rape because of these reasons.

A notable case was that of 30-year-old Mukhtaran Bibi (Mukhtār Mā'ī), who was gang-raped in 2002 as an "honor rape" on the orders of the village council, after allegations that her 12-year-old brother had sexual relations with a woman from a higher caste. In fact, Mukhar Maiai's 12-year-old brother, Abdul Shakoor (or Shakur), had been abducted by three men from the Mastoi tribe, taken to a sugar field, and gang-raped (sodomized) repeatedly. When the boy refused to stay silent about the incident, he was kept imprisoned in the home of Abdul Khaliq, a Mastoi man. When police came to investigate, Shakoor was instead accused of having an affair with Khaliq's sister, Salma Naseen, who was in her late 20s at the time. Shakoor was then arrested on charges of adultery but later released. In later trials, Shakoor's rapists were convicted of sodomy and sentenced to five years of imprisonment.

However, the Mastoi tribal council (or jirga) convened separately regarding Shakoor's alleged affair with Naseen. They concluded that Shakoor should marry Naseen, while Mai (a Gujar tribeswoman) should be married to a Mastoi man, but the villagers rejected this conclusion due to their belief that adultery must be punished with adultery. Mai was called to the council to apologize to the Mastoi tribe for her brother's actions. When she arrived, she was dragged to a nearby hut where in retaliation she was gang-raped by four Mastoi men, while an additional ten or so individuals watched. Following the rape, she was paraded nude through the village. Although custom would expect her to commit suicide after being raped, Mukhtaran spoke up and pursued the case, which was then picked up by both domestic and international media. On 1 September 2002, an anti-terrorism court sentenced six men, including the four rapists, to death.

=== United Kingdom ===
The Investigations into the Rotherham child sexual exploitation scandal and Grooming gangs scandal describe a culture of gang rapes and child sexual abuse.

=== Societies in which rape is almost non-existent ===
There are societies in which rape is almost non-existent, such as the Minangkabau of Indonesia. According to anthropologist Peggy Reeves Sanday, rape is less likely to occur within cultures that are peaceful (have low rates of interpersonal violence), promote mutual respect between the sexes, and lack an ideology of male toughness (machismo). The society of Minangkabau has an Islamic religious background of complementarianism and places a greater number of men than women in positions of religious and political power. The culture is also matrilineal, so inheritance and proprietorship pass from mother to daughter. The society of Minangkabau exhibits the ability of societies to eradicate rape without social equity of genders.

== Criticisms ==
Some writers, academics and groups have disputed the existence or prevalence of rape culture or described the concept as harmful. Others believe that rape culture exists, but disagree with certain interpretations or analyses of it.

The Rape, Abuse & Incest National Network (RAINN), an anti-sexual violence organization, in a report detailing recommendations to the U.S. White House on combating rape on college campuses, identified problems with an overemphasis on the concept of rape culture as a means of preventing rape and as a cause for rape, saying,

In the last few years, there has been an unfortunate trend towards blaming "rape culture" for the extensive problem of sexual violence on campuses. While it is helpful to point out the systemic barriers to addressing the problem, it is important to not lose sight of a simple fact: Rape is caused not by cultural factors but by the conscious decisions, of a small percentage of the community, to commit a violent crime.

In the report, RAINN cites a study by David Lisak, which estimated that 3% of college men were responsible for 90% of campus rapes. RAINN argues that rape is the product of individuals who have decided to disregard the overwhelming cultural message that rape is wrong. The report argues that the trend towards focusing on cultural factors that supposedly condone rape "has the paradoxical effect of making it harder to stop sexual violence, since it removes the focus from the individual at fault, and seemingly mitigates personal responsibility for his or her own actions".

Academic Camille Paglia has described concerns about rape culture as "ridiculous" and "neurotic", an artifact of bourgeois liberal ideologies that people are essentially good and that all social problems can be remedied with education. This rape culture concept is much to the detriment of young college-educated women, she says. Paglia argues that said individuals are ill-prepared to anticipate or cope with the small minority of deeply evil people in the world, who simply do not care about following laws or obeying social convention. Moreover, Paglia says, feminist proponents of rape culture tend to completely ignore male victims of sexual assault.

Caroline Kitchens, in a 2014 article in Time magazine titled "It's Time to End 'Rape Culture' Hysteria" suggested that "Though rape is certainly a serious problem, there's no evidence that it's considered a cultural norm. ...On college campuses, obsession with eliminating 'rape culture' has led to censorship and hysteria." According to Joyce E. Williams, "the major criticism of rape culture and the feminist theory from which it emanates is the monolithic implication that ultimately all women are victimized by all men".

Christina Hoff Sommers has disputed the existence of rape culture, arguing that the common "one in four women will be raped in her lifetime" claim is based on a flawed study, but frequently cited because it leads to campus anti-rape groups receiving public funding. Sommers has examined and also criticized other rape studies for their methodology, and states, "There are many researchers who study rape victimization, but their relatively low figures generate no headlines."

Sommers and others have specifically questioned Mary Koss's oft-cited 1984 study that claimed 1 in 4 college women have been victims of rape, charging it overstated rape of women and downplayed the incidence of men being the victims of unwanted sex. According to Sommers, as many as 73% of the subjects of Koss's study disagreed with her characterization that they had been raped, while others have pointed out that Koss's study focused on the victimization of women, downplaying the significance of sexual victimization of men, even though its own data indicated one in seven college men had been victims of unwanted sex. Sommers said that Koss had deliberately narrowed the definition of unwanted sexual encounters for men to instances where men were penetrated.

Other writers, such as bell hooks, have criticized the rape culture paradigm on the grounds that it is too narrowly focused; in 1984, she wrote that it ignores rape's place in an overarching "culture of violence". In 1993 she contributed a chapter to a book on rape culture, focusing on rape culture in the context of patriarchy in black culture.

Barbara Kay, a Canadian journalist, has been critical of feminist Mary Koss's discussion of rape culture, describing the notion that "rape represents an extreme behavior but one that is on a continuum with normal male behavior within the culture" as "remarkably misandric".

Jadaliyya, an academic initiative by the Arab Studies Institute, published a report critiquing the concept of rape culture, stating that orientalists have appropriated the term to promote racist stereotypes of South Asian men (as well as Arabs and Muslims) as being prone to rape in Western media and academia. The report came in response to the 2012 Delhi gang rape, in which many Western media outlets reporting on the incident depicted Indian men as "culturally lacking and barbaric". The report claimed Western orientalists have reduced "India's rape crisis to a cultural problem".

The UN conducted its 'Multi-country Study on Men and Violence in Asia and the Pacific' in 2008 in six countries across Asia. Its conclusions, published in 2013, seemed to indicate a substantial number of men in Asian countries admit to committing some form of rape. The study's general conclusion about high levels of rape have been recognized as reliable; however, questions about its accuracy perpetuate the debate about how societies perceive rape and social norms. A closer look at the study's methodology reveals questions about cultural definitions of rape, the study's sample size, survey design, and linguistic accuracy, all of which highlights ongoing challenges in trying to quantify the prevalence of rape.

== SlutWalk ==
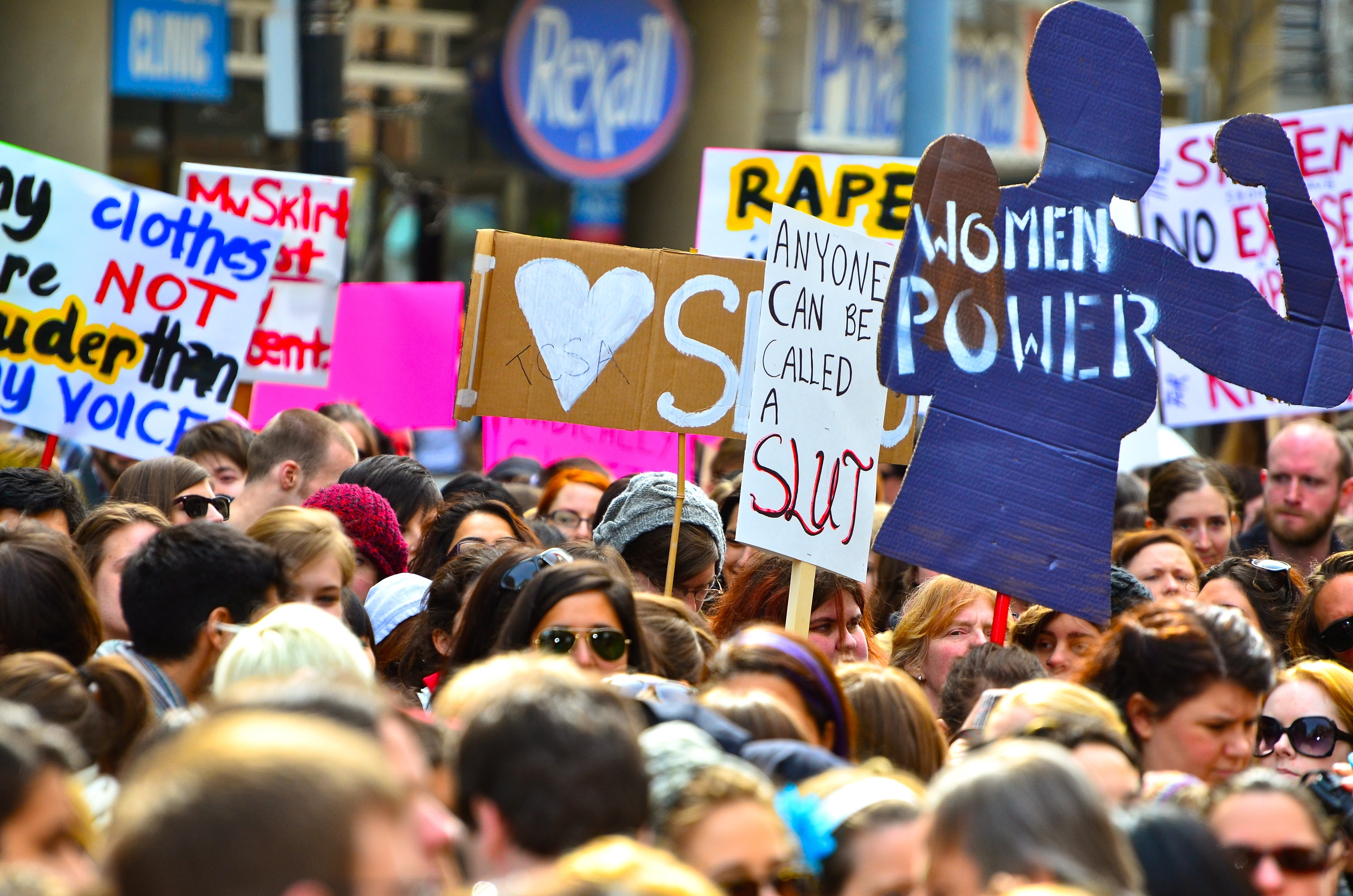
The first SlutWalk in Toronto, Ontario, 3 April 2011

SlutWalk is a feminist organization that formed in response to a public statement made by Toronto police officer Michael Sanguinetti on 24 January 2011. While addressing the issue of campus rape at a York University safety forum, Sanguinetti said that "women should avoid dressing like sluts in order not to be victimized". In addition, it also happened in India created by a group of college students to help address the violence enacted upon women.

The SlutWalk movement are credited with popularizing the term via mass media reports about the protesters in the English-speaking Western media. The rallies aim to raise awareness of rape culture—which they define as a culture in which "sexual violence is both made to be invisible and inevitable"—and to end slut-shaming and victim blaming. One primary goal of this organization is to deconstruct the stigma that often comes with being a victim of rape or sexual assault. Ringrose and Renold said that "the stigma relates to the way women dress and behave, but in fact male sexual aggression is the problem". A SlutWalk that took place in London promoted several different kinds of attire including lingerie, nipple tassels, and T-shirts with slogans to demonstrate what women wear is not a form of consent for sex. The SlutWalk of Philadelphia was rebranded as The March to End Rape Culture. The idea behind the name change is so the walk can be more inclusive and promotes more diversity in its participants, volunteers, and sponsors. The original SlutWalk took place in the city of Toronto, Ontario. Amber Rose is also a figure in the United States where she holds her annual Amber Rose SlutWalk in Los Angeles, California while also raising awareness for empowerment and the Amber Rose Foundation.

SlutWalks have taken place in some conservative Catholic countries such as Costa Rica, Nicaragua and Guatemala. According to "Sex and the Barrio" writers Edgerton and Sotirova, SlutWalk protests began in South America taking on the name "Marcha de las Putas". They are protesting the idea that women dressed in revealing clothing are asking to get raped. They held the walk in the Argentine capitol of Buenos Aires on 28 September 1990, a day that was named the Day for the Decriminalization of Abortion in Latin America. Due to the overwhelming Catholic influence, some SlutWalks have taken on an anti-Catholic tone in response to sermons, such as the one in Costa Rica, where a leading clergyman preached that "Women should dress modestly to avoid being 'objectified'", adding that the purpose of sex is "fertilization". The march even reached the Cathedral of San Jose just as mass was concluding.

== See also ==
- Campaign against the Lebanese rape-marriage law Article 522
- Culture of violence theory
- Exploitation of women in mass media
- High-trust and low-trust societies
- Misogyny and mass media
- Post-assault treatment of sexual assault victims
- Rape chant
- Rape in the United States
- Rape schedule
- Rotherham child sexual exploitation scandal
- Separatist feminism
