= Debauchery =

Debauchery may refer to:

- Corruption
- Libertinism
- Lust
- Binge drinking
- Currency debasement
- Debauchery (band), a German death metal band

== See also ==
- Sodom, or the Quintessence of Debauchery, a 1684 closet drama.
- LGBT rights in Kuwait, which are influenced by "debauchery" law.
- Campaign Against Lebanese Rape Law – Article 522, which amended different laws in the Penal Code, some including debauchery.
