= Peggy Reeves Sanday =

Anthropologist

Peggy Reeves Sanday (1937 – June 13, 2025) was an American cultural anthropologist and academic. She was a professor of anthropology at the University of Pennsylvania, where she joined the faculty in 1972 and later became professor emerita. Her research focused on gender, sexual inequality, rape, matrifocality, public-interest anthropology, and the Minangkabau of West Sumatra, Indonesia. Sanday died on June 13, 2025, at the age of 87.

== Early life and education ==
Sanday was born in Long Island City, New York. She received a Bachelor of Science degree in anthropology from Columbia University in 1960 and a PhD in anthropology from the University of Pittsburgh in 1966. After completing her doctorate, she served as a Mellon Postdoctoral Fellow at Pittsburgh and later taught at Carnegie-Mellon University before joining the University of Pennsylvania.

== Career ==
Sanday joined the University of Pennsylvania faculty in 1972 as an associate professor of anthropology. She became a full professor in 1985, was named the R. Jean Brownlee Endowed Term Chair in 2001, and retired in 2007 with emerita status.

Her scholarship addressed the anthropology of gender, multiculturalism, sexual culture, and public interest anthropology. She was known for developing work on matrifocality and for long-term research among the Minangkabau people of Indonesia, described by Penn as the world’s largest contemporary matrilineal society. This research informed her book Women at the Center: Life in a Modern Matriarchy.

Sanday also wrote on sexual assault and institutional culture on American college campuses. Her books included Fraternity Gang Rape: Sex, Brotherhood, and Privilege on Campus and A Woman Scorned: Acquaintance Rape on Trial.

Another strand of her work concerned ritual cannibalism and symbolic systems. Her book Divine Hunger: Cannibalism as a Cultural System was published by Cambridge University Press in 1986.

Her 1981 book Female Power and Male Dominance: On the Origins of Sexual Inequality examined cross-cultural patterns in male and female power relations.

== Honors and recognition ==
Sanday was a recipient of a Guggenheim Fellowship and received support from the National Science Foundation. In 2015, she received the annual award for work on gender equity from the Committee on Gender Equity in Anthropology of the American Anthropological Association.

== Selected works ==
- Female Power and Male Dominance: On the Origins of Sexual Inequality (1981)
- Divine Hunger: Cannibalism as a Cultural System (1986)
- Fraternity Gang Rape: Sex, Brotherhood, and Privilege on Campus
- A Woman Scorned: Acquaintance Rape on Trial
- Women at the Center: Life in a Modern Matriarchy (2002)

== See also ==
- Feminist anthropology
- Matriarchy
- Rape culture
