= SlutWalk in Latin America =

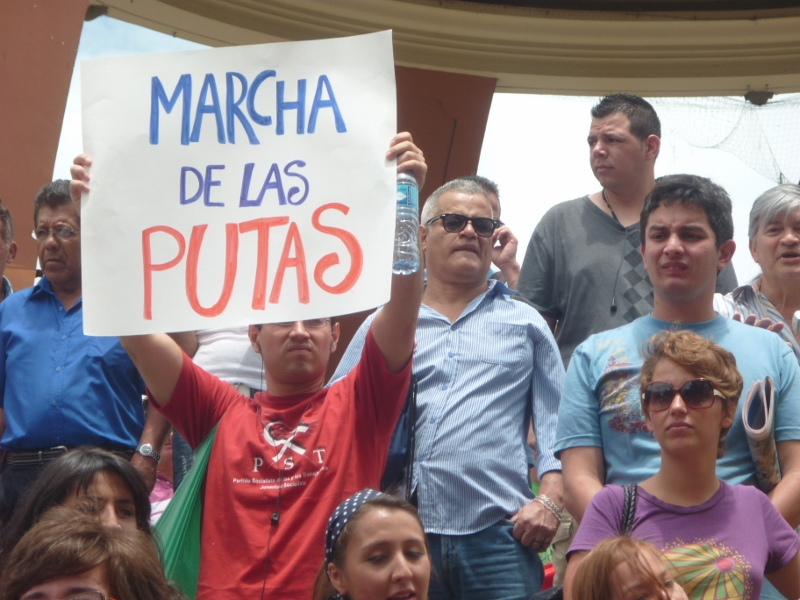
Marcha de las putas in Costa Rica, August 14, 2011

SlutWalks in Latin America were renamed "Marcha das Vadias" in Brazil and "La Marcha de las Putas" in most Spanish-speaking countries, sometimes using PUTAS as an acronym for "Por una transformación Auténtica y Social (For an Authentic and Social Transformation)" Some countries like Argentina, Brazil, and Colombia were known to host simultaneous Slutwalks in different cities. In almost all countries, Slutwalks are repeated annually, although not always in the same cities. Some protests select their dates to match significant events such as the International Day for the Elimination of Violence against Women and the World Youth Day.

There were some interactions noted between the organizers in different countries. Organizers from Argentina had previously contacted their counterparts in Mexico and Venezuela through social networks, and artist Adriana Minolitti participated in Mexican Slutwalks before becoming an organizer herself at Buenos Aires. They were, in turn, contacted by organizers in Bolivia and Uruguay to get assistance. Also, the organizer of the national Slutwalk at Colombia had some previous interaction with organizers in Peru, and Argentine activist Leonor Silvestri travelled to Chile to help organize La Marcha de las Maracas in Santiago. In most countries, the LGBT community actively participated, and many protests were attended by sex workers, with others expressing their solidarity. There was also a common regional chant: "!Alerta, alerta, alerta que camina la Marcha de las Putas por América Latina!" (Alert! Alert! Alert, the sluts are walking to Latin America!).

The Latin American protests shared the same purpose as those in other continents, but were additionally directed at local state authorities and members of the Catholic church whose public comments they saw as reinforcing gender stereotypes and a culture of violence against women. Protesters wore Catholic costumes in several countries, while many protests demanded a secular state and blamed the Catholic church for holding back women's rights. There were some exceptions like Colombia, where Catholics joined the protests. The Marcha das Vadias against the public spending for the visit of Pope Francis in Copacabana, Brazil, featured dissident Catholic groups marching among the protesters as well.

Some protests evolved into permanent organizations, continued working throughout the year to combat violence against women, and participated or organized events other than the typical SlutWalks to raise awareness on sexual assault.

== Argentina ==
On August 12, 2011, the first SlutWalk took place simultaneously in Buenos Aires, Rosario and Mar del Plata, under the name "La Marcha de las Putas". The organizers, most of them belonging to women's and human rights organizations, described the march as "not a strategy to fight, but a union of women and men to demand respect for the individual liberties of women." Participants mentioned the alarming rates of murdered women and human trafficking for sexual exploitation in Argentina as motives to join the SlutWalk. Feminist deputy María José Lubertino, who participated in the protest, said: "Even though it started in a foreign country, this march helps us build a better citizenship and that is what pushes public policies forward." On November 25, 2011, La Marcha de las Putas protested in the city of Mendoza. The day was selected for being the International Day for the Elimination of Violence against Women. A document issued by the organizers states: "we will march to demand an end to all forms of violence against women, the figure of femicide as aggravation incorporated into the penal code, budget for the implementation of the Domestic Violence Act and the processing and approval of the law for voluntary interruption of pregnancy.

New Marchas de las Putas were held in Buenos Aires, Córdoba, San Juan and Mar del Plata on November 3, 2012. The main theme for the protest were sexual stereotypes. The march began with an exposition of photographs from the previous rally. There were also workshops and debate spaces regarding intimate and social respect, non-sexist education and media violence, while several music bands performed on stage. Organizer Verónica Lemi explained: "marching is not enough. We need to raise awareness and create spaces for reflection and debate so we can take our slogans to our daily lives. We need society to stop justifying, tolerating or minimizing sexual abuses, and to stop victim-blaming." She also pointed at the need to promote that "sexual abuse survivors speak of their experiences without being judged for it, and get the help they need to heal." The objective of the protest was to re-signify the word "puta" (equivalent for "slut", but also for "prostitute"), to take its violent power away so it cannot be used to cause harm, to favor the construction of a society where everyone is respected regardless of gender, sexual orientation or chosen lifestyle.

On October 6, 2013, another Marcha de las Putas took place in Buenos Aires. It began with an open space for sharing experiences of abuse, most of which had happened to the speakers during childhood or as teenagers, and kept silenced during years. "It took me twelve years to tell my family I was abused when I was 10. I only was able to do it after I joined this movement and found other people went through similar situations" explained Deborah, one of the organizers. Rita González, other of the organizers, explained the march is framed in a wider range of "actions done during the whole year, to give legal assistance, emotional support and company to people who have been through difficult situations, which they begin to overcome in healing encounters where they can verbalize their pain." The selected slogan for the protest was: "Desnudando la cultura de la violación (Disclosing rape culture)". Other cities known to host Slutwalks were Posadas, La Plata and Formosa.

María José Lubertino, once again participant of the march, said: "in the 21st century, we cannot allow women to be judged for how we dress. A few weeks ago our President Cristina was discredited for wearing leggings, a clear example of what we see in a daily basis in different spheres. It's ridiculous and a typical patriarchal behavior. La Marcha de las Putas is about getting actively involved in building a new reality, in which respect, recognition and effective equality between men and women prevail."

On November 19, 2013, La Marcha de las Putas participated among several other organizations in a wider protest to raise awareness on child sexual abuse. It included activities related to the importance of detection and prevention of child molestation, legal processes, and healing. The protest advocated for better laws, and for the effective application of the existing laws. The day was closed with speeches from the organizations, and artistic activities for the participants.

== Brazil ==
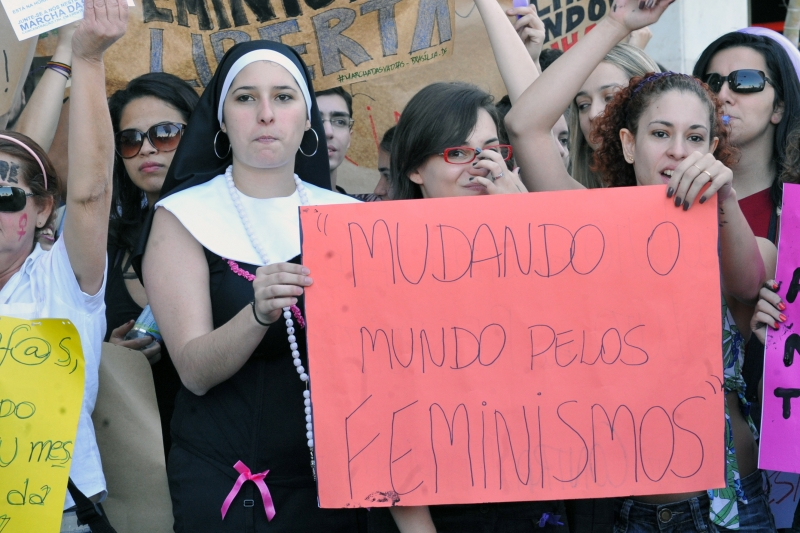
Marcha das Vadias at Brasília, on June 18, 2011. The sign reads: "Changing the world through Feminisms"

The first SlutWalk took place in São Paulo under the name "Marcha das Vadias" (also "Marcha de las Vagabundas") on June 4, 2011. Around 300 people gathered, marching in daily outfits. Only a 23 years old student participated in underwear. The organizers of the event, writer Solange De-Ré and publicist Madô Lopez explained: "We do not want Carnival. We want people to dress normally, as they like to wear." On June 18, 2011 a new Marcha das Vadias gathered one thousand people at Brasília. Despite the name, the SlutWalk brought together women, men and families, sometimes including babies. Participants chanted slogans against sexual abuse. On July 2, 2011, hundreds of people attended Marcha das Vadias at Copacabana, in the South Zone of Rio de Janeiro. Participants advocated for the improvement in hospitals and police stations for women victims of sexual abuse, access to abortion with no paperwork when pregnancy is the result of rape, and the effective implementation of the Lei Maria da Penha, in cases of battered women. During 2011, new Marchas das Vadias were organized at Belo Horizonte, Florianópolis, Juiz de Fora, Recife, Fortaleza, Porto Alegre and Natal.

On May 26, 2012, Marcha das Vadias took place simultaneously in Brasília, Rio de Janeiro, Belo Horizonte, São Paulo and Vitória, among others. During the march in Brasília, a man participating in the protest began to speak offensive phrases to women and homosexuals, and then dropped his pants to show his penis. He was quickly arrested and taken to a nearby police station.

On May 25, 2013, Marcha das Vadias was held in Recife and São Paulo, gathering over 2000 and 1000 people respectively. Késia Salgado, organizer at Recife stated: "The march is to show that women will no longer be silent, that impunity will not happen; we live a social epidemic and have to reeducate ourselves. Marcha das Vadias does not end when the protest is over, we keep working so that daily violence is not forgotten." In this city, the protest included various artistic interventions of groups supporting the cause. Towards the end of the march at Praça da Independência, the group opened space for testimonials. With megaphones, women victims of sexual assault shared their experiences with the rest of the participants.

In São Paulo, the march walked past rue Augusta, a street known for being a gathering point for prostitutes, as a gesture of support. "It's in Augusta where we find the women that society likes to call sluts, or rapeable" explained a member of the collective. "Our intention is to create visibility on the fight against violence towards women. We want to encourage women who are suffering violence to break the silence and make men aware of the daily acts of violence they practice." Protesters also handed over to pedestrians a "security card" to be kept in wallets, containing the phone number of services which help abused women.

There was a new Marcha das Vadias organised at Brasília on June 22, 2013, gathering around 3000 people. Protesters spoke against the State intervention on women's bodies, and against religious leaders occupying seats in State institutions. A new episode was reported of a man who, in apparent state of drunkenness, insulted the manifestants and dropped his pants.

In Copacabana, Rio de Janeiro, Marcha das Vadias was planned to match a visit from Pope Francis to the city, on June 22, 2013, in the context of the World Youth Day, and the protest was renamed "Jornada Mundial das Vadias (World Slut Day)". Organizer Rogéria Peixinho explained "performing the act during the Pope's visit is also a way to put another youth on the street, establishing a political counterpoint. We want to show that there is another youth and another way of thinking about the world, and the chosen date also has to do with it." There were several participants in costumes representing religious characters such as nuns and the Pope, and signs with puns and slogans rejecting religious views on women and sexuality. A group called Católicas Pelo Direito de Decidir (Catholic Women for the Right to Choose) in favor of abortion, women priests and married priests, participated in the protest.

Peixinho asserted the importance of the Pope's visit regarding the objectives of Marcha das Vadias: "The presence of the Pope and the public resources allocated for the visit of a spiritual leader calls into question the secular State. (...) This matter falls within the axes of our movement, as well as the right to the body, the complaints about the rape cases that are increasing especially in Rio, and the formulation of public policies to protect women." The participants, during the march, encountered a group of about 50 pilgrims from France, Chile and Italy, participating in the World Youth Day, who were offended by the act and started insulting the participants. A pilgrim spat in the face of a protester. However, most pilgrims peacefully observed the demonstration and some foreigners, without realizing it, mingled among the protesters.

During the protest, some of the participants smashed statues of saints. Peixinho assured the action was not planned nor encouraged by the organizers, but after the incident several of them suffered death threats via phone calls, text messages and messages on social networks, and several pages were created on Facebook exposing their phone numbers and addresses. The movement denounced the case to the Human Rights Commission of Alerj and sought support of Amnesty International.

=== Demonstration at Marcha das Vadias – Porto Alegre ===
During the 2014 Marcha das Vadias (SlutWalk), a group of black women organized by Coletivo Negracao held demonstrations that called attention to violence against black women. The goal in holding this demonstration was to highlight the way black women's dual identities as black and women intersect to create dual oppression, different from that of the predominately white feminists at Marcha das Vadias. During the demonstrations women chanted things such as "Claudie Ferreria resists", referring and standing in solidarity to the black woman who was murdered and then dragged on the street attached to a Military Police Van in Rio de Janeiro. In addition to the chants, phrases such as "This is not an invitation", were written on the bodies of the demonstrators to protest sexual abuse and sexism against black women. The protest proceeded to divide into two locations, at a Women's Police Station and Cidade Baixa. At the Women's Police Station, the focus was violence against women perpetuated by the police. Open letters with demands, such as better service conditions at the station, increased vacancies in shelters for female victims of violence and violence prevention programs. Protesters as well laid in the street to symbolically depict the systemic violence against black women in Brazil. The sector of the protest that continued to Cidade Baixa, marked the pavement with graffiti at places where sexist, racist and homophobic events occurred. One of the demonstration stops were at Pingium bar in which protestors booed the bar, kissed, and burned the entrance carpet along with their bras.

== Chile ==
On September 19, 2011 the first Slutwalk took place in the city of Santiago with the name La Marcha de las Putas y las Maracas, and was appointed to walk from Plaza del Corregidor to Estación Mapocho. The protest was organized by collective Rita Lazo, which explained: "this is an answer to the violence still present in many areas of our lives. When we appropriate and re-signify the word "puta", we take down its offensive meaning and fight against the dominance over our bodies. We abort fear: when a woman says NO it means NO. Nothing justifies a rapist's actions. Let us break the rules on how to "be a woman". This struggle is not only one of women, but of society as a whole. That's why we say: WE ARE ALL PUTAS!"

On January 13, 2012, over 400 people, mostly female students, marched in the city of Ñuñoa under the name "La Marcha de las Putas" to protest against the city mayor Pedro Sabat for his saying regarding the occupation of the Female National Boarding School. In a debate with the president of the Student Federation, Camila Vallejo, Sabat described the Boarding School as "a harlotry", and accused the students of engaging in sex trade within the institution. Previous to the protest, the students presented legal charges for defamation against the mayor.

Io Guiria, spokeswoman of the students ensured that they were "ready to carry out the protest to the very end". "We believe the Justice system must take action after such serious declarations" she stated, and also added they expect an indemnity as well as a public apology "and, if possible, jail time." The protest ended when Special Carabiniers Forces acted to prevent the crowd from cutting street traffic on Irarrázaval street, and faced protesters with tear gas bombs and water cannons. Student Natalia Torres was hit by a stone in the head and was left unattended for 40 minutes until she got help from a doctor who walked by. Six people were arrested by the time the protest was over.

== Colombia ==
On February 25, 2012, the first Slutwalk was held with the name "La Marcha de las Putas" in the cities of Armenia, Bucaramanga, Barranquilla, Manizales, Medellín, Pereira, the island of San Andrés, Villavicencio, Tunja, and Bogotá, gathering up to 2000 people in the country's capital, at Bolívar Square. The participants included men, women, the LGBT community, intellectuals, college students and Catholic Church representatives. Some men assisted in naked torsos and wearing red lipstick. There were also many topless women, one of which explained: "I came naked today because it must be clear than my body is mine alone, and even walking in bare breasts only I decide who gets to touch me." Mar Candela, one of the organizers, was in charge of the opening speech: "We suffer to be called sluts for living our sexuality freely. When we are victims of violence, there are those who dare say we "asked for it". We are victims of harassment in buses, in streets, in public spaces. This society need to understand that when a woman says no, it's no." In Colombia, a woman is victim of abuse every 6 hours, and an average 245 women are victims of some kind of violence every day. Mar Candela stated La Marcha de las Putas proved that all sections of society are committed to ending it. "We'll do it. We'll make possible that no woman is made victim of violence under the complicity of society's silence."

The protest was closed by a speech from a group of sex workers who demanded the government and society to recognize their rights. Darly, one of them, expressed: "We want to be respected. We work with our bodies, like everyone else. The shoemaker uses his hands to make shoes, the football player uses his feet to score goals. Therefore, being a prostitute, no one has the right to point a finger at me or treat me with violence." Social NGOs Opción Colombia and Red Colombiana de Masculinidades no Hegemónicas (Colombian Network of non-Hegemonic Masculinities) also participated in the protest.

On April 6, 2013, La Marcha de las Putas was held simultaneously in Bogotá, where over 1000 people attended, Barranquilla, Cali, Cartagena, Manizales and Medellín. Mar Candela, organiser at Bogotá and coordinator of the protest on the national level, decided to use the word "PUTAS" as an acronym for "Por Una Transformación Auténtica y Social (For An Authentic Social Transformation)", which had been used in Peru during the protests. She adds: "The word "puta" shouldn't even be used as an offense, and doing so reveals great ignorance. Whatever a woman does with her vagina, she is a human being with full individual rights. It is commonly said that being a prostitute means losing constitutional rights and State protection, but prostitution is legal in Colombia. And even if it was illegal, they are still in complete possession of their rights, because human rights apply even for criminals."

According to Mar Candela, all fractions of society were represented in the march including Catholics, protestants, LGBT, atheists, artists, agnostics and krishnas, which allowed to treat the subject outside of the traditional feminist context. She also spoke regarding activities from La Marcha de las Putas apart from the street protests: "we've been collaborating with schools and communities in different neighborhoods, and now we're magnifying those processes. Today, our feminist movement and the urban pedagogy of Slutwalk counts on the presence of sexual psychologist Alejandra Quintero, who's strongly supporting the matter of female body empowerment." As well as fighting conservative attitudes, women and women's organizations on the march were concerned about the sexual violence that has been an integral part of the armed conflict. The UN has called on Colombia to end impunity for sexual crimes by the armed forces.

Rubiela Valderrama, organiser at Cartagena, stated that many organizations, collectives and foundations were invited to join the protest. She also explained the objective of La Marcha de las Putas is "to create interest among the Cartagena community, to promote its participation in affirmative action focused on the transformation of individual and collective conscience to break the oppression, injustice and any rule or norm which naturalizes violence against women in the city."

On November 17, 2013, La Marcha de las Putas organised a protest in front of a famous restaurant in Bogotá called Andrés Carne de Res. An accusation had been made on November 2, of a 19-year-old woman who was raped by a lawyer in the restaurant's parking lot and Andrés Jaramillo, owner of the restaurant, pointed at the victim's clothes as an explanation. The initiative was spread mainly through social networks. After the events, Jaramillo apologized and denied having a sexist attitude, and the accused rapist presented himself at the public prosecutor's office for questioning, but was not arrested.

== Costa Rica ==
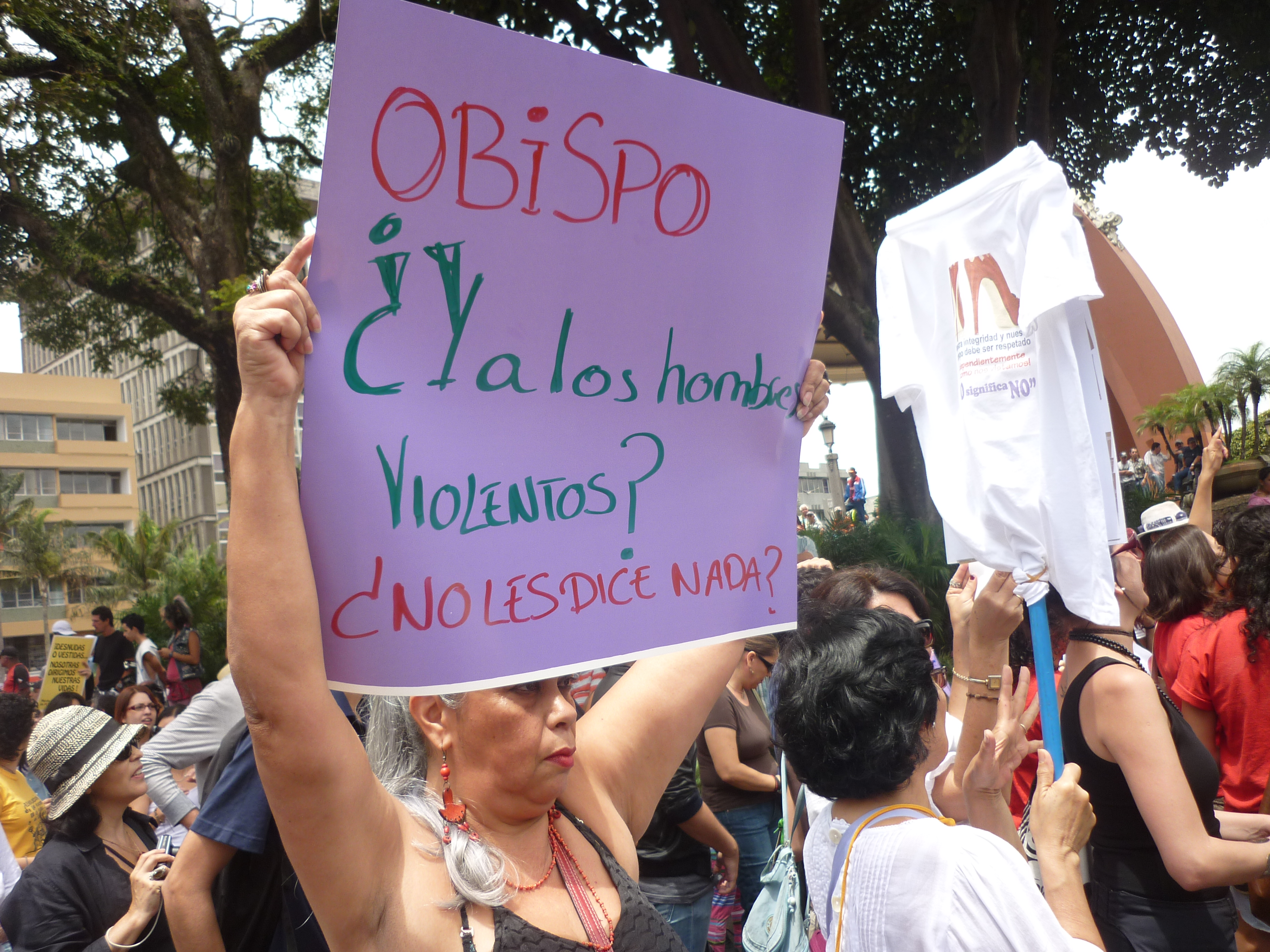
Marcha de las putas in Costa Rica, August 14, 2011. The sign reads: "Bishop, what about violent men? Won't you say anything to them?"

On August 14, 2011, the first Slutwalk of Costa Rica was held in the city of San José with the name "La Marcha de las Putas" and the invitation was spread mainly through social networks. Organizer Montserrat Sagot, university professor and feminist leader, is the author of several books including "When Violence Against Women Kills: Femicide in Costa Rica." The protest was directed against remarks made on August 2 by senior Catholic clerics during a ceremony in Cartago honouring Costa Rica's patron saint, the Virgen de los Ángeles.

At the event, Bishop José Francisco Ulloa called on women to dress "modestly" to not be "dehumanized" and "objectified." "The sexual gift that God gave women is wrapped in love and fidelity for its ultimate purpose: fertilization," Ulloa said. Mexican Cardinal Francisco Robles, representing Pope Benedict XVI, said at the ceremony that a woman's mission "does not consist in emulating men, but rather in creating a more humane world by exercising creativity in the household." Robles urged women to enter public life "without imitating men," and to strengthen their role at home as mothers and family members. "The mandate from the (Catholic) church for women to act with modesty and decency is the same conservative message that intends to blame women for the abuses of which they are victims," Sagot said.

The group of organizers issued a communication in defense of the right of women to dress as they wish, with no Church or institution imposing limitations. "Our claim is the most basic of feminism: we decide over our own lives, no one else has to tell us how to dress, what to think or what we should do. On the contrary, it is necessary to teach men not to rape, assault and abuse" says the document. It also demanded the enforcement of the Convention on the Elimination of All Forms of Discrimination against Women (CEDAW), ratified by Costa Rica in 1986 and the Convention of Belém do Pará (Inter-American Convention on the Prevention, Punishment and Eradication of Violence against Women) ratified by Costa Rica in 1995.

After the protest, Sagot wrote: "The march proved that in this country exists a new generation, who is not willing to answer with "good manners" to institutions which, like the Catholic hierarchy, disrespect their rights, blame women for the violence they suffer and which, from a position of power ( ... ) attempt to impose norms and lifestyles to people who do not agree with them." She also linked the protests to the "evident commitments" of President Laura Chinchilla to the Catholic Church.

On November 22, 2013, a second Marcha de las Putas was organised at San José with the slogan "No es no. La violencia nunca es consentida (No means no: violence is never consented)". The choice of the slogan denounced sayings from former deputy Oscar Lopez, who declared there is "a thin line between consent and rape". Organizers claim such statements minimize the problem of sexual violence against women, justify the actions of rapists, and reinforce misogynistic speech. Their aim was that Lopez retracts his comments and recognises that sexual assault as a serious form of violence against women. They also called for Lopez's political party, Partido de Accessibilidad Sin Exclusión, to commit on taking action, and for all other political parties to pronounce on the matter.

== Ecuador ==
On March 11, 2012, the first Slutwalk took place in Quito, with the name "La Marcha de las Putas". Sex workers and transgender people attended the event, and the meeting of the organizer previous to the protest was at Casa Transgénero (Transgender House). Social movement Ruptura also supported the march, stating: "This protest advocates for the right of women to express their reality in their clothes, poses and make up, and this can't be turned into an excuse for harassment and abuse."

On April 22, 2013, another Marcha de las Putas was organized in Quito by feminist and LGBT collectives, gathering nearly 3000 people. Organizer Ana Almeida explained: "We want to establish a precedent of this message of no violence against women, because women's bodies must be respected; we can't allow women to be stigmatized for their clothes. Nothing can justify violence. We make a constant political work to redefine the word "puta" and what it means to both women and men."

At the march, there was an increased number of male participants, as well as people with naked torsos, a fake Catholic priest in pink robe, many signs with rhymes and slogans, live musicians and stiltwalkers. Halfway through the protest, rain began to pour down, but the protest continued while many chanted: "¡Que llueva, que llueva, las putas no se ahuevan! (Let it rain, let it rain, sluts don't give up!)"

== Honduras ==
On August 6, 2011, Andrea Nuila co-organized the event with her group Atrévete, the Tegucigalpa chapter of Hollaback!, an international women-led movement to end street harassment. For Nuila, the march is also about confronting the dangerous combination of male dominance and impunity that puts Honduran women at risk, as seen in the high occurrence of femicide. "They're increasing every day. We believe that women are not only victims of sexual harassment, they're also victims of domestic violence. And we have a big level of impunity from the state institutions" she said.

Francisco Murillo López, head of the Dirección Nacional de Investigación Criminal (National Direction of Criminal Investigation), was asked to explain the rise in the killing of women. He said "the most significant factor is gender equality. Women are participating in roles that were previously carried out by men. Today we see women driving taxis, driving a truck. This shows how much Honduran society is changing, and therefore it is normal to see women dying. Gender equality is the principal reason that women are now involved in violent affairs linked to organized gangs and common crime."

However, according to the research of Ana Carcedo, the region's foremost expert on femicide, 12% of female homicides in Honduras can be linked to organized crime, while in 40% of the cases, the killer is either a current or former lover, while more than 9% of the killings result from sexual attacks, and almost 8% of the women are being killed by their family members. All in all, according to Carcedo, in roughly three-quarters of the cases, the women were killed in one way or another for being women. This is the opposite of the conclusion of the Honduran police chief that they are being killed for taking on male roles.

Sandra Maribel, director of the radio station Radio Gualcho, was present at the event. According to her analysis: "The use of language to discriminate based on the way we dress is related to the broader women's struggle in Honduras. There's lots of violence inside the home, and we want to change that. Maybe a good place to start is by changing the language used to refer to us women." She also referred to the recent ban on the morning-after pill approved by the Congress of Honduras: "The women's struggle isn't isolated from the larger struggle of the Honduran people. It's a liberation struggle, not only in the political sense, but in every sense. And the Honduran women have been active participants in the resistance against the Honduras coup d'etat. But we're not doing it just to make the crowd bigger. We want the order of things to change in this country."

Maria Victoria, a participant who works as an HIV/AIDS prevention worker, urged people to consider how the word slut is used to discriminate against the trans community as well: "Women and trans people who choose to dress sexy shouldn't be called sluts." Fernando Reyes, of Honduras' diversity and resistance movement considered the march as a response to all forms of intolerance: "Today is the best example, seeing all the youth of the sexual diversity and various cultural collectives demonstrating and realizing that even as youths they have a right to be who they want to be."

As a closing activity, participants took turns writing messages on the side of the city's main Catholic cathedral. Nuila explained: "The church is one of the institutions that has oppressed women's rights the most, especially in a Catholic country like ours. Abortion is illegal in Honduras, not only for the women, because it's criminalized from three to six years in jail, but he doctor is also penalized, and their license restricted."

On December 8, 2012, hundreds of people participated in the second Marcha de las Putas at Tegucigalpa. Many women assisted with their male partners, and the protest counted on the participation of LGBT organizations. "We're marching to protest against the sexual harassment us women suffer for the way we choose to dress" explained Karla Martínez, coordinator of the protest, "we're tired of our clothing being an excuse for men to feel they have the right to rape us or grope us, that's why we're here today, demanding an end to violence against women."

Mildred Tejada, from the United Nations System, was present at Marcha de las Putas. "The word "puta" causes aversion, it's an insult to all women regardless of the profession they exercise" she said. Sergio Ulloa, one of the male protesters, commented on the march: "We live in a machista country, and it's about time men stop harassing and sexually abusing women. Women must have their rights respected, and men must respect and value women."

== Mexico ==
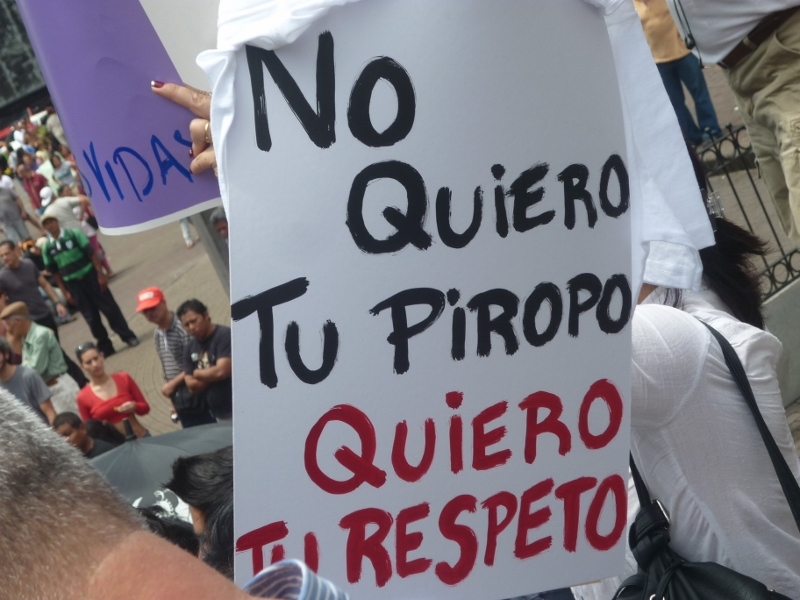
Sign from La Marcha de las Putas saying: "I don't want your catcalling, I want your respect"

On June 12, 2011 Slutwalk took place in Mexico City, with the name Marcha de las Putas. Women, men and children, mostly in casual wear but some in heels and schoolgirl miniskirts, marched with signs saying "No means No" and "prostitutes are sacred." One self-described grandmother in a low-cut blouse advised women to dress as they pleased. "This is a problem of all society" said Edith López, spokeswoman of the protest, "we need to re-educate ourselves, because victims of sexual violence are not the ones responsible." Similar walks were held in Cancún, Guadalajara, Oaxaca and Sinaloa.

According to different non-government organizations, violence against women has raised by 30%, and an average 1200 women each year receive medical assistance for domestic or workplace violence. Official data from Mexico show that during the years 1999 to 2005, over six thousand girls and women were murdered for being women. Gabriela Amancaya, from Atrévete DF, the local version of Hollaback!, participated in the protest in Mexico City, and explained the goal was to "raise consciousness around the fact that we are tired of street harassment, of abuse in general, and of the silence which always surrounds those subjects." The invitation was made through social networks, and gathered thousands of participants to the march.

On June 27, 2011, Marcha de las Putas was organized at Puebla, with the participation of activists, students, housewives, academics, professionals, mothers and a few female politicians, whose presence was questioned by some participants who considered they were not so interested in gender equality as they were in being seen among the crowd. About a dozen women were dressed as prostitutes, and at least one was in a nun costume. They explained their goal was to show that in either of those outfits, they must be equally respected. There was also a runway with different types of shoe wear, including high heels, sandals, boots and sport shoes, with colorful signs about their pretended owners: "one who kisses whoever she wants", "one who works". They were beneath a bigger sign stating: "Putas somos todas, o ninguna (Either all of us or none of us is a slut)." On July 16, 2011, Marcha de las Putas was held in Uruapan.

On October 8, 2012, a new Marcha de las Putas was held at Puebla. Natali Hernández participated with her non-profit organization, Red por los Derechos Sexuales y Reproductivos (Network for Sexual and Reproductive Rights), which denounced in the State of Puebla there's an accusation of sexual violence against a woman every 12 hours, making that state the fifth in sexual violence occurrence, in a country where the average of denounces is one every 17 hours. The protest finished in front of Puebla's City Hall, where the protesters pronounciated against sexual violence. They stressed that in the previous six years, murders of women raised up to three times. Figures show 341 femicides in 2005 against 619 in 2011, marking an 81% increase.

On November 25, 2012, a new Marcha de las Putas was organized in Tuxtla Gutiérrez to match the International Day for the Elimination of Violence against Women. Martha Figuero Mier participated in the protest with her NGO Colectivo de Mujeres (Colem), and as an activist is representing several cases of women's rights violations in Chiapas at the Inter-American Commission on Human Rights. Previous to the march, her organization had denounced 67 femicides of indigenous women during 2012. She explained the number was based only in the cases covered by the media, since the Attorney General's Office of Chiapas did not respond to their requests for information about number and status of the processes of femicides.

"When a woman is assaulted or murdered, the authorities qualify it as a crime of passion, disregarding the larger social structure which minimizes and violates the rights of women. We demand public policies to eliminate all forms of violence against women" added the participants of the protest. Alejandra Peralta, head of the Secretaría para el Desarrollo y Empoderamiento de las Mujeres (Secretary for the Development and Empowerment of Women) at the State Government, also participated in La Marcha de las Putas. She admitted there are high records of violence against women, but the numbers and statistics on femicides and accusations for assault must be administered by the Attorney General's Office.

== Nicaragua ==
On June 11, 2011, the first Slutwalk was held in Matagalpa under the name "Marcha de las Putas", with the objective of bringing an end to the naturalization of violence against women and blaming of victims based on their appearance. According to the Network of Women Against Violence, 89 women in Nicaragua were murdered by their partner or another individual known to them on 2012. Edume Larracochea, Spanish leader of Red de Mujeres de Matagalpa (Matagalpa Women Network) and organizer of the event, said dozens of women assisted, wearing jeans or skirts, high heels or flats, as they chose. "The march was a great success, we feel people were interested and we want everyone to reflect on sexual violence" she added.

At the end of the protest, Red de Mujeres de Matagalpa read a document denouncing society for "using the word "puta" to stigmatize and discredit those women who are courageous enough to decide over our bodies and our lives." It also states the protersters "are tired of hearing us women provoke, and therefore are guilty" of sexual violence.

== Panamá ==
On October 25, 2011 the first Slutwalk was held in Panamá City with the name "La Marcha de las Putas". Among the 500 men and women who joined the protest on a rainy day, there were a few prostitutes who, despite prostitution being legal in Panamá, expressed their complaints regarding their situation. The march began outside the headquarters of the Attorney General's Office. The participants said they were demanding respect and an end to domestic violence in the country. Actress Janelle Davidson explained she supported the cause, even though she was not able to attend the protest. She narrated a visit to her doctor at the age of 17 wearing jeans and a low-cut blouse, in which she got told: "Look at yourself! Then you'll complain when you get raped". "It doesn't matter whether you dress sexy or not, respect is fundamental" she added.

Colombian journalist Carolina Ángel Idrobo was also present at the protest to cover the story for Panamanian newspaper La Prensa. On the day following the march, she was given a verbal warning from her editor for being seen dancing and singing among the protesters, arguing activism was incompatible with journalism at La Prensa. Idrobo apologized to the editor, but on November 2 she was called by the director, who informed her she was fired. The FELCOPER (Federación Colombiana de Periodistas - Colombian Federation of Journalists) pronounced in favor of Idrobo, expressing their worry around censorship and discrimination inside independent media, as well as unfair layoffs based on ideology. "Freedom of speech cannot be a right to be claimed only from the media to society, it must also be guaranteed by the media to its workers" explained Adriana Hurtado, president of FELCOPER.

== Perú ==
On November 12, 2011, a Slutwalk was held in Lima with the name "La Marcha de las Putas". Over 100 women in short skirts and lingerie joined the protest and handed pamphlets to bystanders. "People are surprised to see women dressed like this, it always catches the eye" explained Fiorella Farje, one of the organizers and member of P.U.T.A.S., Por Una Transformación Auténtica y Social (For An Authentic Social Transformation). "We were a bit scared for the name of the protest, that we might have problems or the message could be distorted, but the reaction was very positive" she added.

On November 10, 2012, a new Marcha de las Putas took place in Lima, gathering around 150 people. Ana Lucía Álvarez, spokeswoman of the organization, explained to the local media it was not a march of prostitutes, but rather one of young people against violence towards women and street harassment. "We also recognize prostitutes have dignity, deserve respect from all society and we reject the mistreatment they suffer from the police."

== Uruguay ==
On December 9, 2012, the first Slutwalk was held with the name "La Marcha de las Putas", inviting men, women, transgender people and children alike. "Each one of us participates with as much or as little clothing as they wish" explained the organizers, "Our demand is that society stops tolerating and minimizing sexual abuses, and instead of blaming the victim, have the perpetrator severely judged."

The protest was also directed to a comment made by President José Mujica to those who were asking for the resignation of Fernando Calloia, head of the Banco de la República. Mujica answered publicly in Brasília saying "they had better control their wives." During their speech at the protest, the organizers answered: "We don't want to be controlled, men believe they are owners of any woman. Patriarchy tells them they are incontinent and therefore can't stop themselves nor respect us. But we look for partners, not owners."

Sociologist Teresa Herrera also addressed the remark: "Mr. President, the ideology of men exercising power over women is the eldest in the world, even previous to the richness-poverty relation, and its ideological justification is, unfortunately, supported in all cultures. Because of this, we have deep-rooted behaviors we must "unlearn" and new ways of relating and knowing each other we must apprehend. Us women don't need to be controlled, in fact, control is the first step of violence against us."

== See also ==
- Ele Não movement – protests in Brazil against the presidential campaign of Jair Bolsonaro
