= Nourine Abouseada =

Egyptian singer (born 4 July 1999)

- نورين أبو سعدة
- Born: Nourine Abouseada; 4 July 1999 (age 26); Cairo, Egypt
- Occupations: Singer; television judge; businesswoman
- Years active: 2017–present
- Musical career
- Genres: Arabic pop; romance; world
- Instrument: Vocals
- Label: Mazzika (distributor)

Nureen Abu Saada or Nourine Abouseada (Arabic: نورين أبو سعدة; 4 July 1999) is an Egyptian singer and actor.

== Early life and education ==
She was born in Cairo September 18, 2000. She studied at the Faculty of Arts at Sorbonne University.

== Career ==
She worked as a model when she was young, and appeared in several television advertisements. She made several attempts at singing and released some solo songs, such as: the song “What Do You Say” and a duet entitled “Hob Khanaq” with the rapper Marwan Moussa She had her first acting experience on the small screen through Investigation series, which was produced in 2022. She was chosen to participate in Al Shanab film in 2023.
