= USS Heath Hen =

Minesweeper of the United States Navy

History

United States
- Name: USS Heath Hen
- Namesake: Heath hen
- Builder: A. D. Storey, Fairhaven, Massachusetts
- Launched: 1936, as Noreen
- Acquired: 18 October 1940
- Commissioned: 20 January 1941
- Reclassified: Small Boat C-13538
- Fate: Transferred to the Maritime Commission and sold, 10 May 1948

General characteristics
- Type: Coastal minesweeper
- Displacement: 270 long tons (274 t)
- Length: 94 ft 4 in (28.75 m)
- Beam: 22 ft (6.7 m)
- Draft: 8 ft 6 in (2.59 m)
- Speed: 9 knots (17 km/h; 10 mph)
- Complement: 16

USS Heath Hen (AMc-6) was a wooden dragger (trawler), built in 1936 by A. D. Storey, Fairhaven, Massachusetts, as Noreen. Acquired by the United States Navy on 18 October 1940, she was converted to a coastal minesweeper and commissioned on 20 January 1941 as USS Heath Hen (AMc-6). The small ship served in the 5th Naval District until 16 March 1944 when she arrived Provincetown, Massachusetts, for duty with the Naval Mine Test Facility. Redesignated Small Boat C-13538, her name was dropped and she served in mine warfare experiments until damaged by an oil explosion on 16 March 1945. She was subsequently turned over to the Maritime Commission and sold on 10 May 1948.
