= Campaign against the Lebanese rape-marriage law Article 522 =

The Campaign against the Lebanese rape-marriage law Article 522, officially known as "A White Dress Doesn't Cover the Rape", was launched by the Lebanese non-governmental organization Abaad MENA in December 2016. Its aim was to abolish Article 522 of the Lebanese Penal Code, which allows a man to avoid punishment for rape if he produces a valid marriage contract with the victim. The campaign included street protests, the hashtag #Undress522 in social media, and a video of a raped women covered in bruises turned into a bride.

A month before the launching of the campaign, the NGO executed a country-wide plan to raise awareness on the article, to which only 1% of Lebanese population were discerned of.

It is not the first time that Lebanon repeals a law considered to be against human rights. Article 562 of the penal code was amended in 1999, which legalized honor killings whenever a man found his spouse, sister, ascendants or descendants in a situation of unlawful sexual intercourse. Furthermore, on April 1, 2014, the parliament passed a law with the aim to protect women against domestic violence. There are no accurate figures about sexual assaults on women since most women do not report due to the sensitivity of the topic.

Within the first few weeks of the campaign, influential figures expressed their support for the movement against Article 522; for example, Prime Minister Saad Hariri did so on his Twitter account. Despite the fact that Lebanon ratified the 1979 United Nations Convention on the Elimination of All Forms of Discrimination Against Women, and other international treaties such as the Protocol to Prevent, Suppress and Punish Trafficking in Persons, especially Women and Children, which supplements the United Nations Convention against Transnational Organized Crime, the country used to maintain what it has been described as ‘crimes of honor.’

In 2017, Lebanon abolished Article 522 and declared reexamination of Articles 505 and 518.

== Article 522 of the Lebanese penal code ==
During the Ottoman Empire, Lebanon was a region subject to Ottoman legislation, which was inspired by the French Penal Code of 1810. After World War I and the fall of the Ottoman Empire, the French Mandate for Syria and the Lebanon was established in the country. During this period, the Ottoman law continued to be applied until the creation of the Lebanese Penal Code in 1943, which was drawn from the French Penal Code of 1810.

Article 522 of Lebanese Penal code allowed men, who had been convicted of sexual assault, abduction, or statutory rape against a woman, to avoid penalty of no less than five years of hard labor if a valid contract of marriage could be provided. Article 522 was officially admitted to the Lebanese Penal Code in February 1948. Its original form stated: "If a valid contract of marriage is made between the perpetrator of any of the offenses mentioned in this section, and the victim, the prosecution is suspended. If judgment was already passed, the implementation of the punishment is suspended."

In December 2016, the Lebanese Parliamentary Committee for Administration and Justice made the announcement that an agreement had been made to repeal Article 522 from the Lebanese penal code. For the law to be repealed, the parliament has to confirm the committee's decision.

On August 16, 2017, Parliament abolished Article 522.

== Activism ==
"A White Dress Doesn't Cover the Rape" did not only aim abolishing Article 522, but it also defended the right of victims who refuse to marry their rapist. The campaign also intended to eliminate stigmatization and shaming regarding rape. The campaign sought to gain cooperation by raising awareness of the distinction between rape as a crime and what society views as honor. It also stressed that forced marriage legitimizes sexual assault against women.

Abaad MENA #Undress522

On November 13, 2016, Abaad MENA organized a flashmob coinciding with the 14th edition of the Beirut Marathon. Dozens of girls and women marched wearing white T-shirts that read in Arabic and/or English "Abolish #522." The participants had their heads covered with white boxes and held pink balloons with the slogan "الإغتصاب جريمة" (rape is a crime). The activists were led by participants while playing drums and a banner in Arabic with the same slogan on their T-shirts and balloons.

Abaad MENA was founded in 2011 in Beirut, Lebanon. They work on gender equality as a sustainable economic and social development in the MENA region. Abaad MENA seeks to promote women's participation through policy development. It has a network of activists, social workers and lawyers who work on issues which marginalized groups encounter in the Lebanese society

On November 30, 2016, a woman dressed like a bride with bruises covered in blood stained bandages stood in front of the Parliament of Lebanon in Downtown Beirut, where the Administration and Justice Committee was discussing the draft law to abolish Article 522. Abaad MENA organized a similar public protest on December 6, 2016, in which around a dozen of women gathered in front of the Parliament wearing white dresses and bandages around their eyes, hands and knees stained with fake blood. The activists held banners that read "الأبيض ما بيغطّي الإغتصاب / White won't cover rape," "نعم لإلغاءالمادة 522 / Yes to abolition of Article 522," and "ما تلبسونا ٥٢٢# / #Undress522."

A week before the street protest on December 6, Abaad MENA released a video directed by Danielle Rizkallah and according to the director, the video was conceived to start with a rape and finish with another one. The video shows a naked woman on the ground dragged by different hands that cover her bruises with white bandages until she ends up dressed like a bride. In the end, there is a message displayed in Arabic that reads "Article 522 of the Lebanese Penal Code exempts the rapist of its prosecution if he marries his victim." Finally, the model screams and another two messages in Arabic appear, the first reads "White doesn't cover the rape" and the second "#Undress522."

The campaign also activated #Undress522 on Social media. The same hashtag has been employed to set up a petition webpage against Article 522. The supporters of the campaign can sign the petition to abolish the law.

In March 2017, the sculptor Mireille Honein hung 31 wedding dresses in Beirut's Corniche to denounce that every day women are raped and forced into marriage. The dresses were made of paper and hung from nooses between four palm trees.

== Media coverage ==
Although the Lebanese Forces MP Elie Keyrouz had suggested the annulment of law 522 in July 2016, the media specifically focused its attention on the campaign after the Abaad MENA's public demonstrations. The NGO's first public appearance on November 13 went almost unnoticed, as well as the protest carried out by one activist in front of the parliament when the MPs were discussing the draft law. An increased attention of both national and international media arose when Abaad MENA organized the protest of around a dozen women in front of the Parliament in December when the video directed by Danielle Rizkallah was released. Furthermore, local media such as The Daily Star (Lebanon) reported other related aspects of the campaign like the declarations of MP Robert Ghanem, chair of Parliament's Administration and Justice Committee before the Parliament's examination of the law, the declarations of a lawyer working in Abaad MENA once the Committee guaranteed the reviewing of the article, and the reexamination in February 2017 of the so-called "Assaults on Honor" from Articles 503 to 522. Moreover, the French-language daily newspaper L'Orient-Le Jour conducted an interview with Danielle Rizkallah shortly after the video was published on social media. The newspaper also reported the deputies' statements regarding the reviewing of the article and their participation in the protests launched by the NGO. The newspaper reported the amendments of Articles 503 to 521 along the two exemptions to which Article 522 are still applicable.

International media such as the CNN, TV5Monde, and BBC extensively drew attention to the street protest carried out on December 6 and the content of Article 522. Other media publications also reported about the declarations inside the Parliament while reexamining the law such as The Independent, which published on MP supporters of Article 522 who argued that the Article allowed families to repair the damage done to their honor. On September 6, 2016 Al Arabiya informed that during the Lebanese Democratic Women's Gathering centered on the abolition of Article 522 and the impossibility for Lebanese women to pass on citizenship rights to their children. Kataeb MP Elie Marouni declared "[i]n some cases, we need to ask if women play an active role in pushing men to rape them." During the meeting, a journalist and co-founder of women's rights group FE-MALE accused Marouni of offending all women in the room. On September 7, 2016, the Kataeb leader Samy Gemayel condemned Marouni's comment and the following day Gemayel tweeted that the rapist is the only one accountable for the act of rape.

== Lebanon abolishes Article 522 and amends others ==
On February 15, 2017, the Committee for Administration and Justice of the Lebanese parliament declared the abolition of Article 522. However, the Article is maintained in two situations. In Article 505, when the sexual assault is practiced with a girl between 15 and 18, given that the girl had given her consent prior; and in Article 518, when the sexual relation is practiced with a girl between 15 and 18, given that a promise of marriage had been made prior. In both cases, a valid marriage consented by the minor and her parents would prevent the imprisonment of the male. Moreover, after the marriage, a social worker has to submit a report concerning the psychological conditions of the woman every six months for the first three years. Furthermore, the Parliament announced that same day that amendments were being implemented from Articles 503 to 521 in order to reinforce the penalties in case that the sexual act involves a girl under 15.

Article 516 has been repealed and its dispositions are included in Articles 514 and 515. Article 514 states that the person who abducts a female minor or a female adult with the intention of marrying her commits an offense and can be imprisoned up to three years. Article 515 states that the person who kidnaps a man or a woman with the purpose of debauchery can be sentenced to hard labor for at least seven years. Article 516 permitted the person who committed acts described in Articles 514 and 515 not to be condemned if the acts were committed without deception nor violence on a person under 15. After the abolition of Article 516, Articles 514 and 515 state that the person who has committed the acts can be sentenced even if the acts were committed without deception nor violence on a person under 15.

== "Rape culture" in Lebanon ==
During 2016, several NGO's held different events and activist campaigns to raise awareness towards what they believe to be a "Rape Culture." This activism was a result of episodes of sexual assault where there has been no repercussions or conviction against the perpetrators. According to Nay el-Rahi, “It’s (rape) normalized and people just don’t do necessarily anything about it. Unless it’s something as flagrant as this (above) case”. The concept of “rape culture” is related to both sexualization of women, sexual assault on women and men, domestic violence, and the normalization of objectification of the other gender. The awareness of and anger towards the Lebanese "rape culture" rose after the Lebanese MP Elie Marouni stated “In some cases, we need to ask if women play an active role in pushing men to rape them", in relations to the abolishment of Article 522.

== Countries that have abolished similar articles ==
Several human rights organizations such as Human Rights Watch, and the United Nations Human Rights High Commission have strongly criticized laws like Article 522 in other parts of the world. These organizations have been working towards abolishing this kind of laws, and in several cases they have been successful.

== "Rape marriage" legislation throughout the world ==
"Rape marriage" law, as it is popularly named, has its roots in Roman law about Raptus, and further in medieval law. Though the laws can be formed in different ways, they all share the characteristic that it ceases persecution in the case of a marriage contract can be provided. Laws of this nature are still practiced in several different countries, such as Algeria, Bahrain, Iraq, Kuwait, Libya, the Philippines, Syria and Tajikistan.

In Iraq, article 398 of the Penal Code No. 111 of 1969 allows the perpetrator of sexual assault to avoid punishment by marrying the woman for at least 3 years. Only if the husband decides to divorce his wife in a period inferior to 3 years would the proceedings for investigation of the sexual assault be undertaken again. In this case, the public prosecutor, the ex-husband, the divorced woman or any person interested in the proceedings is eligible to request an investigation for the events.

In Kuwait, Article 182 states that persecution will be dropped in cases of sexual assault if the assailant married the woman, with the permission of a guardian. In Afghanistan, Article 26 was adopted as recent as 2014, which provided a ban on relatives of an accused person to testifying against them. Though this does not specifically effect rape or marriage, there has been cases in which this was the outcome.
