= Rape schedule =

Concept in feminist theory

Rape schedule is a concept in feminist theory used to describe the notion that women are conditioned to place restrictions on and/or make alterations to their daily lifestyles and behaviours as a result of constant fear of sexual assault. These altered behaviours may occur consciously or unconsciously.

== Origin of concept ==
The term rape schedule was first used in 1984 in Dianne Herman's essay "Rape Culture", included in Women: A Feminist Perspective (3rd. edition, Jo Freeman, Mountain View, CA: Mayfield, 1984) and Changing Our Power (J.W. Cochran & D. Langton eds., 1988). It was later made popular by Jessica Valenti, through her book Full Frontal Feminism.

The concept has since been cited and discussed by feminist scholars across disciplines, including criminologist Jody Miller, lawyer Catharine MacKinnon, and philosopher Susan Griffin. These individuals have speculated on the impact of rape schedule on women's freedom, access to rights, relationships with others, and self worth.

== Background ==
=== Statistical context ===
Statistical analysis based on victim reporting can be used to demonstrate the prevalence of sexual assault in the United States. According to the 2015 National Crime Victimization Survey, on average, 321,500 people aged 12 or older in the US are raped or assaulted each year. Among this population, women are more likely to be raped than men: 1 in 6 women will experience an attempted or completed rape in their lifetime, compared with 1 in 33 men. 91% of victims of rape and sexual assault are female.

These statistics are also influenced by sexuality:

- 46.4% of lesbian women and 40.2% gay men;
- 74.9% of bisexual women and 47.4% bisexual men;
- and 43.4% of heterosexual women and 20.8% heterosexual men

have reported experiencing some form of sexual violence in their lifetime, according to the National Sexual Violence Resource Center.

Age also influences rates of sexual assault. For example, when compared with the overall national average for women, women aged 18–24 who are college students are three times as likely to be victims of sexual assault; women in the same age group that are not attending college are four times as likely to experience sexual assault.

Rape is one of the most underreported crimes in America.

=== Privilege ===
A privilege is a right or advantage granted to a specific population that is not allowed to others. In a sociological model, privilege outlines the ways that these advantages are results of larger societal systems and demonstrative of social inequality.

Examples of privilege can be found through the lenses of:

- Gender identity
- Class
- Sexuality
- Race
- Age
- Ability
- Religion
- Occupation

These lenses of privilege can be applied in considering the use of rape schedule. For example, Jody Miller has explained that prostitutes cannot adhere to a rape schedule as it would leave them 'unable to work' – adhering to a rape schedule in this manner could be seen to be 'born of privilege'.

== Effects ==
=== Fear ===
Fear of sexual assault is a commonly shared sentiment among many individuals in today's society, especially women. Rape schedule dictates that this fear often forces individuals to make alterations within their everyday life, shifting routines and limiting activity to conform with a level of invisibility that will provide protection. Examples of this behavior includes taking specific routes home, being indoors by specific hours of the night, avoiding going places alone, or dressing in a specific manner. Here, fear functions as both a cause and effect.

=== Mental and emotional impact ===
In the 1970s, the term rape trauma syndrome was introduced by Ann Wolbert Burgess and Lynda Lytle Holmstrom.

Rape can lead to mental health disorders, such as PTSD, and statistical evidence demonstrates this trend. According to Dean G. Kilpatrick, from the National Violence Against Women Prevention Research Center, 31% of all rape victims develop some form of PTSD at some point in their lifetime and those who were victims of rape were "6.2 times more likely to develop PTSD than women who had never been victims of crime". Victims were also three times more likely than those who had not been sexual assaulted to experience a major depressive episode, 13.4 times more likely to have two or more major alcohol problems, and 26 times more likely to have two or more serious drug abuse problems.

Because of these severe incidents, women develop rape schedules to help them try to avoid the possibility of rape occurring in the future. As a result of these fear-based rape schedules, women can be left feeling powerless, which can have an extremely debilitating impact on women's self-worth.

=== Vulnerability ===
Despite adherence to any form of rape schedule, women are not guaranteed safety from the threat of sexual assault. Despite precaution, they can still be left and feel vulnerable, a phenomenon largely experienced by women and less universally by men.

In an informal survey mentioned by Mary Dickson in her article, "A Woman's Worst Nightmare", many men reported that they do not feel fear when walking down the street. A man stated "as a man, I'm afraid of very little." However, in that same survey, women listed numerous things they feared. One female responded, "I'm always afraid in a situation where there's somebody that could overpower me easily. I lock my doors, park in lighted areas, don't run in dark areas." This informal survey suggests that especially in these particular situations, women feel a great deal more vulnerable than men.
