= Noreen Connell =

American feminist

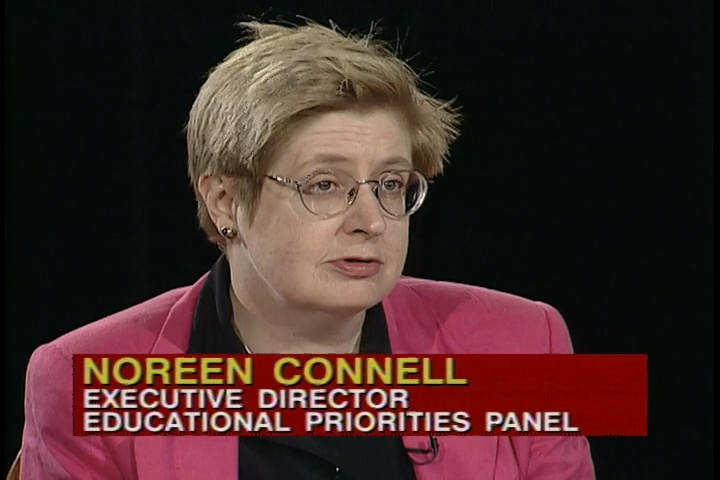
Connell on CUNY TV's Urban Agenda, 1999.

Noreen Connell (born 1947) is an American feminist organizer and writer/editor, known for producing, with fellow New York Radical Feminists (NYRF) member Cassandra Wilson, the 1974 New American Library book Rape: A First Sourcebook for Women by New York Radical Feminists. She first joined the feminist movement through the August 26, 1970, New York City Women's Strike for Equality March and Rally and an autumn 1970 NYRF consciousness-raising group. After working as a NYRF conference and speak-out organizer and a founding member of the Women Office Workers in the early 1970s, Connell has chiefly served as an elected officer of women's rights advocacy groups such as the National Organization for Women (NOW).

== Activism ==
Connell is best known for co-writing Rape: The First Sourcebook for Women by New York Radical Feminists, the first book to be published from proceedings of the April 1971 New York Radical Feminist Rape Conference. In January 1972, Connell and Wilson began work on what was to be a pamphlet "from a pile of (conference) notes and cassette tapes in a Bloomingdale's bag." As volunteers, they transcribed tapes, obtained rights from the conference's speakers and workshop participants scattered about the country, and added other articles for the 283-page book's fruition in December 1974.

A New York State delegate to the 1977 Houston National Women's Conference and 1980 White House Conference on Families, Connell has chiefly held elective offices in the National Organization for Women (NOW) founding chapter in New York City, NOW-NYC, from 1973–2009. Connell was elected Board Chair in 1979, serving five terms, most recently from 2002–2004, to president for the 1977–1979 term and to other offices, in 2008 Vice President of Legislation.

Connell was elected president of NOW's New York State organization, NOW-NYS, from 1984–1988 when it grew to 36 chapters. NOW-NYS sponsored feminist contingents Connell lead to research international women's rights movements in England, Iceland, Norway and Spain. The organization also held a statewide day-long meeting with 25 organizations in which Connell, Congresswoman Bella Abzug and Brooklyn District Attorney Elizabeth Holtzman were keynote speakers about continued discrimination against women in the New York State legal system despite a year's passing after the release of the April 1986 Report of New York Task Force on Women in the Courts.

Connell's feminist organizing and writing/editing activities have encompassed sexual abuse and women's employment issues including anti-discrimination hiring and work/family policies such the childcare necessary to support women's employment.

She, Betty Friedan, and several others, for the White House Conference on Families (1980), did planning to emphasize the Equal Rights Amendment (ERA) and family and economic issues over what Betty Friedan identified as sexual issues, including abortion, and to associate abortion with "the choice to have children."

=== Women's employment ===
Connell's work on women's employment issues—for which she received the 1984 Coalition of Labor Union Women New York City Chapter Award—began with her serving a co-organizer of NYRF's October 14, 1973 Speak-out on the Jobs of Working Class Women in Coalition with Professional Household Workers. She then, in 1974, co-founded the 1974–1982(?) New York Women Office Workers (W.O.W) with Annie Chamberlain and Susanne Paul and served on its staff through 1977. During her tenure in early 1976, W.O.W. through its research, filed age and sex discrimination complaints against five employment agencies and the New York State Employment Service after a woman of 50 sent to these services received no job referrals while her partner researcher of 25 with equal skills and training received referrals from all. As liaison vice president and president of NOW-NYC, between 1975 and 1979, she challenged layoffs of women during an economic downturn vis-a-vis progress they achieved with affirmative actions and started a job development program for New York City's first 40 women longshore workers. She was a 1983-1984 Assistant Commissioner for the New York State Department of Labor she resigned after being elected president of NOW-NYS and from 1979 a Board Member of the Workers Defense League that assists low income workers in receiving compensation when unemployed or disabled.

Connell's activism to obtain more extensive childcare to support women's employment began with her chairing the NOW-NYC childcare committee in 1973. The 1978 The Women's Yellow Pages: Original Sourcebook for Women, New York Edition includes two of her childcare articles "The Politics of Childcare" and "What Is Good Child Care?" from this activism. In 1988, she authored "Feminists and Families" in the August 16, 1986 issue of The Nation reprinted in a ?1988 edition of The Utne Reader that urged women's rights groups to demonstrate the better effects of their policies such as childcare on families than those of the right wing.

== Veteran Feminists of America ==
While still active in NOW-NYC in 1992, Connell became a founding member of Veteran Feminists of America that seeks to share experiences of 1970's feminists with those in upcoming generations. At NOW-NYC, she has given talks to new members about 1970's feminist organizing methods. For example, in an early 2004 presentation with former Brooklyn Congresswoman Elizabeth Holtzman about producing "protest marches", she gave pointers from her experiences organizing 50 buses for the 1978 New York City contingent for NOW's first national march to pass the Equal Rights Amendment to the United States Constitution.

== Personal life ==
Connell was born and raised in Mexico City. After receiving a B.A. in Sociology from Beloit College, Wisconsin, she was a social worker in Chicago and New York City where she received an M.A. in Sociology from The New School for Social Research. She was fired from the waitress job she held while at the New School for taking time from work to attend the August 26, 1970 Women's Equality Day March and Rally. After her 1984–1988 NOW-NYS president term, she was Executive Director of the Education Priorities Panel from 1989–2007.
