= Noreen (surname) =

Noreen is a surname. Notable people with the surname include:

- Adolf Noreen (1854–1925), Swedish linguist
- Anthony Noreen (born 1983), American ice hockey coach
- Camilla Noréen (born 1971), Swedish curler, wife of Per Noréen
- Doris Noreen (born 1913), American supercentenarian - see List of oldest living people
- Per Noréen (born 1965), Swedish curler and curling coach
- Rabia Noreen (born 1965), Pakistani actress
- Roger F. Noreen (1922–1997), American politician and lawyer

== See also ==
- Fethi Nourine (born 1991), Algerian judoka
