= I Never Called It Rape =

1988 book by Robin Warshaw

- Cover of the first edition
- Author: Robin Warshaw
- Subject: Date rape
- Published: 1988
- Media type: Print (Paperback)
- Pages: 227 pp.
- ISBN: 978-0-06-092572-7
- OCLC: 797093370

I Never Called It Rape is a 1988 book by journalist Robin Warshaw. The book focuses on the hidden epidemic of acquaintance and date rape. The book is largely based on a nationwide study in the United States, the Ms. Magazine Campus Project on Sexual Assault. The title references the finding in the study that 73% of women whose sexual assault met the definition of rape did not identify their experience as such.

The study of acquaintance rape on college campuses funded by the National Institute for Mental Health formed the basis for Warshaw's book, which is subtitled The Ms. Report on Recognizing, Fighting, and Surviving Date and Acquaintance Rape. The study was conducted by Ms. magazine and psychologist Mary P. Koss. They found that one in four women respondents had experienced rape or attempted rape, that 84% of survivors knew their attackers, and that 57% of the rapes occurred during dates. Warshaw also draws on scholarly studies and first-person accounts in her analysis. She interviewed and corresponded with 150 women for the book.

Warshaw finds that there is little to differentiate rapists from non-rapists and victims from non-victims. She stresses that men, learning institutions, families, and other social institutions must share in the responsibility for changing societal attitudes towards rape.

== Reception ==
In a review in Feminist Teacher, Ann Goetting found the book to be "a thorough, practical, and highly effective presentation of the social dynamics and consequences of acquaintance-rape among college students."

Katie Roiphe, in her 1993 book The Morning After, questioned whether one in four women are victims of rape, writing "If I were really standing in the middle of an epidemic, a crisis, if 25 percent of my female friends were being raped, wouldn't I know it?"
