= Mary P. Koss =

Clinical psychologist, professor

Mary Koss
- Born: Mary Lyndon Pease; Louisville, Kentucky
- Education: University of Minnesota-Twin Cities
- Spouse: Paul G. Koss
- Awards: 2010 Visionary Award from End Violence Against Women International
- Scientific career
- Fields: Gender-based violence and restorative justice
- Workplaces: University of Arizona

Mary P. Koss is an American clinical psychologst who is Regents' Professor at the Mel and Enid Zuckerman College of Public Health at the University of Arizona in Tucson, Arizona. She is an expert in sexual violence research. She is best known for conducting the first national study on rape in the United States in 1987 and for developing the Sexual Experience Survey (SES), which remains widely used today to assess sexual aggression and victimization.

In 1987, Koss, along with her colleagues, Christine Gidycz and Nadine Wisniewski, published the first national study on rape. The study included the first presentation of the "one in four" statistic that created awareness of the extent of rape among college students, the development of a method for measuring rape, and coining terms such as "date rape" and "acquaintance rape".

== Biography ==
Koss was born in Louisville, Kentucky. Koss's maternal grandparents (William and Marian Lyndon Bade) raised her and her four siblings for a period of time, while their mother rehabilitated from polio. Upon graduating high school at age 17, Koss attended the University of Michigan, where she met her husband, Paul G. Koss. After receiving her A.B. in Psychology with high distinction, she continued her education at the University of Minnesota-Twin Cities along with her husband. While he completed his medical degree, she pursued a PhD in Clinical Psychology. After receiving her doctorate, she completed her clinical psychology residency at the Minneapolis Veterans Administration Medical Center, where she worked with Vietnam War veterans in the area of rehabilitation psychology.

== Career ==
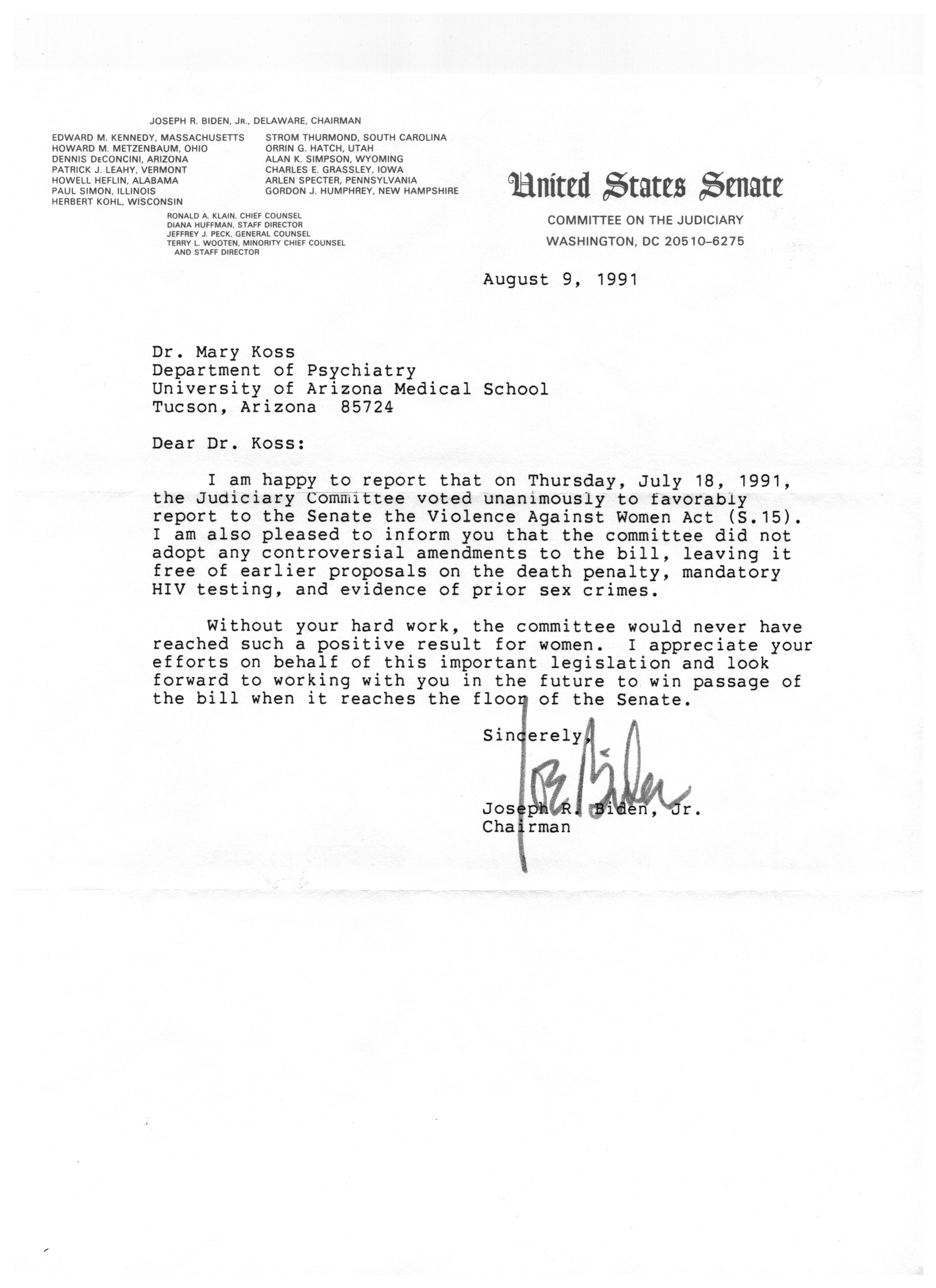
1991 letter addressed to Mary Koss by Joe Biden, then Chairman of the Senate's Committee on the Judiciary

Koss joined the faculty of St. Olaf College as an assistant professor in August 1973. She then transferred to a research university, Kent State in 1976. During her time there, Mary Harvey, of Victims of Violence Center and National Institute of Mental Health, recruited her to lead a study on rape prevalence in collaboration with the Ms. Foundation for Research and Education. The project was federally funded through a competitive grants award process. Koss' work resulted in the 1987 publication, "The Scope of Rape: Incidence and Prevalence of Sexual Aggression and Victimization in a National Sample of Higher Education Students." This was the first national, large-scale survey on rape of its kind. As a result of this and other works, Koss has been credited with coining the terms "date rape", "hidden rape", "unacknowledged rape", "acquaintance rape", and "campus rape". She also published "The Hidden Rape Victim: Personality, Attitudinal and Situational Characteristics." In that paper, she defined the hidden rape victim as, "one who has never reported her experience to a rape crisis center or to police."

Koss defined the unacknowledged rape victims as women who have experienced the behaviors that define rape (oral, anal, or vaginal penetration against consent through force, bodily harm, or when incapacitated and unable to consent) but do not realize that their experience constitutes rape or chose not to view it that way. This is now a well-accepted finding reaffirmed by other investigators in national surveys repeated in the early 2000s and most recently reported in 2012. Koss has served as an invited speaker and guest lecturer around the world. In 1991, she testified as an expert witness at the U.S. Senate hearings that led to the first passage of Violence Against Women Act. Koss has since conducted multiple legislative testimonies, including expert witness testimonies to the U.S. Senate Veteran's Affairs Committee, U.S. News & World Report, Senator Cory Brooker on restorative justice, and US Advisory Commission on Child Abuse. Other legal testimony from Koss includes working with Congressional Briefing on Violence Against Women, and the Legislative Policy Brief released by the Evelyn Jacobs Ortner Center on Family Violence.

On the issue of male victims of rape, Koss has written: "Although consideration of male victims is within the scope of the legal statutes, it is important to restrict the term rape to instances where male victims were penetrated by offenders. It is inappropriate to consider as a rape victim a man who engages in unwanted sexual intercourse with a woman." (Koss 1993 pp 206–207). Elsewhere, she has argued that it is impossible for a woman to rape a man: "How would [a man being raped by a woman] happen… how would that happen by force or threat of force or when the victim is unable to consent? How does that happen?", adding that she would describe this as "unwanted contact".

Koss was offered a faculty position in the Department of Psychiatry at the University of Arizona in 1987 and later transferred to the Mel and Enid Zuckerman College of Public Health in the Division of Health Promotion Sciences. Koss has been at the University of Arizona for 27 years, earning tenure in 1988 and designation Regents' Professor in November 2006.

Koss has published close to 300 works on violence against women, including 145 peer-reviewed scientific articles as well as books, book chapters, and briefs. Her work has been cited over 41,000 times. In addition to the Ms. Study, Koss has led 10 other federally funded research projects. Koss is globally recognized and has been invited as a panelist and speaker to multiple conferences held by the National Institute of Mental Health, the National Coalition for Women's Mental Health, the National Institute of Justice, and others. She has also been a consultant and reviewer for organizations such as the American Psychiatric Association, American Psychological Association, World Bank, the Centers for Disease Control and Prevention, the United States Department of Justice, the World Health Organization, and others. Koss is a Life Member of the American Psychological Association since 1976.

== Restorative justice programs ==
At the University of Arizona, Koss pioneered a restorative justice program, RESTORE. RESTORE is a voluntary conferencing program for adult misdemeanor and felony sexual assault perpetrators who are referred by a prosecutor. "The RESTORE Program for Restorative Justice for Sex Crimes: Vision, Process and Outcomes" is published in the Journal of Interpersonal Violence. "The paper is the first peer-reviewed quantitative evaluation of RJ conferencing for adult sexual assault." Koss and her colleagues from The University of Michigan and Carleton College also collaborated on the article titled, "Campus Sexual Misconduct: Restorative Justice Approaches to Enhance Compliance with Title IX Guidance." This article is published in Trauma, Violence and Abuse: A Review Journal.

== Honors and awards ==
Koss has received over 20 awards and over 70 recognitions throughout her career. Along with her honors and awards, she has been a distinguished member of professional organizations such as the American Psychological Association. Koss also was the first recipient and namesake of the Mary P. Koss Profile in Courage Award from the One-in-Four Organization. This award will be given to another person annually. Her work has also influenced public policy, including her testimony during the drafting of the Violence Against Women Act (VAWA) in 1994, which has become a cornerstone of federal policy on gender-based violence.

- American Psychological Association Award for Distinguished Contributions to Research in Public Policy
- Award for Distinguished Contributions to the International Advancement of Psychology
- 2022 Trailblazer Award: Celebrating the architects of our field on whose shoulders we stand, from the Sexual Violence Research Initiative (WHO-founded, based at the Medical Research Council, Johannesburg, South Africa)
- 2025 Kinsey Institute Award from Indiana University
- Stephen Schafer Award, National Organization for Victim Assistance (NOVA)
- Distinguished Contribution to Women's Health, American Psychological Association, Committee on Women in Psychology
- Distinguished Service Award for the book, No Safe Haven, Male Violence Against Women at Home, at Work, and in the Community
- Heritage Award recognizing a substantial and outstanding body of work, American Psychological Association, Division 35 (Psychology of Women)
- Distinguished Contributions to Research in Public Policy, American Psychological Association
- American Psychological Association Committee on Women in Psychology Leadership Award (Senior Career)
- Presidential Citation, American Psychological Association
- Visionary Award from End Violence Against Women International
- Distinguished Publication Award, Association for Women in Psychology
- Brother Peace Award, National Association of Men Against Sexism
- Distinguished Contribution to the Science of Psychology Award, Arizona Psychological Association
- Distinguished Scholarly Contribution to Research on Acquaintance Rape, Safe Schools Coalition
- Distinguished Contribution to Women's Health, American Psychological Association, Committee on Women in Psychology
- Heritage Award recognizing a substantial and outstanding body of work, American Psychological Association, Division 35 (Psychology of Women)
- Excellence in Teaching and Commitment to Public Health Faculty Award, Public Health Alliance, University of Arizona
- American Psychological Association Committee on Women in Psychology Leadership Award (Senior Career)
- Mel and Enid Zuckerman Arizona College of Public Health Research Prize
- Presidential Citation, American Psychological Association
- Visionary Award from End Violence Against Women International (7th Awardee)
- Mary P. Koss Profile in Courage Award, One-in-Four Organization
- American Psychological Association Award for Contributions to the International Advancement of Psychology
- University of Minnesota Psychology Distinguished Alumni Award
- Albert Nelson Marquis Lifetime Achievement Award (Marquis Who's Who)
- Lifetime Achievement in Violence Against Women Research and Advocacy, Institute for Trauma, Violence and Abuse
- Caroline Wood Sherif Award for Contributions to the Psychology of Women, American Psychological Association, Division 35

== Selected publications ==
=== Books ===
- Koss, Mary P.; Kazdin, Alan E.; White, Jacquelyn W. (2011). Violence against women and children: volume 1: mapping the terrain. Washington, DC: American Psychological Association. ISBN 9781433809125.
- Koss, Mary P.; Kazdin, Alan E.; White, Jacquelyn W. (2011). Violence against women and children: volume 2: navigating solutions. Washington, DC: American Psychological Association. ISBN 9781433809149.

=== Chapters in books ===
- Koss, Mary P.; Cook, Sarah L. (1993), "Facing the facts: date and acquaintance rape are significant problems for women", in Gelles, Richard J.; Loseke, Donileen R. (eds.), Current controversies on family violence, Newbury Park, California: SAGE Publications, pp. 104–119, ISBN 9780803946743.
- Koss, Mary P.; Cook, Sarah L. (2005), "More data have accumulated supporting date and acquaintance rape as significant problems for women", in Gelles, Richard J.; Loseke, Donileen R.; Cavanaugh, Mary M. (eds.), Current controversies on family violence (2nd ed.), Thousand Oaks, California: SAGE, pp. 97–116, ISBN 9780761921066.

=== Journal articles ===
- Koss, Mary P. (June 1985). "The hidden rape victim: personality, attitudinal, and situational characteristics". Psychology of Women Quarterly. 9 (2): 193–212. doi:10.1111/j.1471-6402.1985.tb00872.x. S2CID 144049774.
- Koss, Mary P.; Gidycz, Christine A.; Wisniewski, Nadine (April 1987). "The scope of rape: incidence and prevalence of sexual aggression and victimization in a national sample of higher education students". Journal of Consulting and Clinical Psychology. 55 (2): 162–170. doi:10.1037/0022-006X.55.2.162. PMID 3494755. Pdf.
- Koss, Mary P.; Dinero, Thomas E.; Seibel, Cynthia A.; Cox, Susan L. (March 1988). "Stranger and acquaintance rape: are there differences in the victim's experience?". Psychology of Women Quarterly. 12 (1): 1–24. doi:10.1111/j.1471-6402.1988.tb00924.x. S2CID 144857746.
- Koss, Mary P.; Gidycz, Christine A. (Fall 1991). "Predictors of long-term sexual assault trauma among a national sample of victimized college women". Violence & Victims. 6 (3): 175–190. doi:10.1891/0886-6708.6.3.175. PMID 1818616. S2CID 22539789.
- Koss, Mary P.; Heslet, Lynette (September 1992). "Somatic consequences of violence against women". Archives of Family Medicine. 1 (1): 53–59. doi:10.1001/archfami.1.1.53. PMID 1341588. Pdf.
- Koss, Mary P. (June 1993). "Detecting the scope of rape: a review of prevalence research methods". Journal of Interpersonal Violence. 8 (2): 198–222. doi:10.1177/088626093008002004. S2CID 145469348.
- Koss, Mary P. (October 1993). "Rape: scope, impact, interventions, and public policy responses". American Psychologist. 48 (10): 1062–1069. doi:10.1037/0003-066X.48.10.1062. PMID 8256879.
- Koss, Mary P.; Rozee, Patricia D. (December 2001). "Rape: a century of resistance". Psychology of Women Quarterly. 25 (4): 295–311. doi:10.1111/1471-6402.00030. S2CID 71473792.
- Koss, Mary P.; Hopkins, C. Quince (May 2005). "Incorporating feminist theory and insights into a restorative justice response to sex offenses". Violence Against Women. 11 (5): 693–723. doi:10.1177/1077801205274570. PMID 16043567. S2CID 22330453.
- Koss, Mary P.; West, Carolyn M.; Abbey, Antonia; Campbell, Rebecca; Cook, Sarah; Norris, Jeanette; Testa, Maria; Ullman, Sarah; White, Jacquelyn (December 2007). "Revising the SES: a collaborative process to improve assessment of sexual aggression and victimization" (PDF). Psychology of Women Quarterly. 31 (4): 357–370. doi:10.1111/j.1471-6402.2007.00385.x. S2CID 144908721. Pdf.
- Koss, Mary P.; Cook, Sarah L.; Gidycz, Christine A.; Murphy, Megan (February 2011). "Emerging issues in the measurement of rape victimization". Violence Against Women. 17 (2): 201–218. doi:10.1177/1077801210397741. PMID 21307030. S2CID 206667512.
- Koss, Mary P.; Malamuth, Neil M.; Hald, Gert Martin (April 2012). "Pornography, individual differences in risk and men's acceptance of violence against women in a representative sample". Sex Roles. 66 (7–8): 427–439. doi:10.1007/s11199-011-0082-6. S2CID 51739662.
- Koss, Mary P.; Thompson, Martie P.; Swartout, Kevin M. (July 2013). "Trajectories and predictors of sexually aggressive behaviors during emerging adulthood". Psychology of Violence. 3 (3): 247–259. doi:10.1037/a0030624. PMC 3727658. PMID 23914305. Pdf.
- Koss, Mary P. (June 2014). "The RESTORE program of restorative justice for sex crimes vision, process, and outcomes". Journal of Interpersonal Violence. 29 (9): 1623–1660. doi:10.1177/0886260513511537. PMID 24368680. S2CID 42113128.
- Koss, Mary P.; Wilgus, Jay K.; Williamsen, Kaaren M. (July 2014). "Campus sexual misconduct: restorative justice approaches to enhance compliance with Title IX guidance". Trauma, Violence, & Abuse. 15 (3): 242–257. doi:10.1177/1524838014521500. PMID 24776460. S2CID 8277484. Pdf.
- Koss, Mary P.; Swartout, Kevin M.; White, Jacquelyn W.; Thompson, Martie P.; Abbey, Antonia; Bellis, Alexandra L. (July 2015). "Trajectory analysis of the campus serial rapist assumption". JAMA Pediatrics. 169 (12): 1148–54. doi:10.1001/jamapediatrics.2015.0707. PMID 26168230.

=== Reports ===
- Koss, Mary P & White, Jacquelyn W. (May 2021). VAWA Reauthorization Presents an Opportunity for Bold Transformation. The Gender Policy Report. https://genderpolicyreport.umn.edu/vawa-reauthorization-presents-an-opportunity-for-bold-transformation/

== Policy briefs ==
- Koss, M.P., & Chisolm, K. (February 6, 2020). The Time Is Now: Restorative Justice for Sexual Misconduct. The Chronicle of Higher Education.

=== Mentions ===
- Who's Who (Marquis) Biographee
  - 1983 18th edition, Who's Who in American Women
  - 1987 21st edition, Who's Who in the Midwest
  - 1988 2nd edition, Who's Who in Emerging Leaders
  - 1991 3rd edition, Who's Who in Emerging Leaders
  - 1992 18th edition, Who's Who in American Women
  - 1993 24th edition, Who's Who in the West
  - 2000 55th edition, Who's Who in America
  - 2003 6th edition, Who's Who in American Education
  - 2000 55th edition, Who's Who in America
  - 2006 9th edition, Who's Who in Science and Engineering
  - 2006 26th edition, Who's Who in American Women
  - 2008 27th edition, Who's Who in American Women
  - 2013- 67th and continuous subsequent editions, Who's Who in America, confirmed through 2022
