= Roiphe =

Roiphe is a surname. Notable people with the surname include:

- Anne Roiphe (born 1935), American author and journalist
- Katie Roiphe (born 1968), American author and journalist
- Rebecca Roiphe (fl. 1993), American lawyer and legal historian
