= Gray rape =

Sex for which consent is unclear

Gray rape, also spelled as grey rape, is a colloquial description of sexual intercourse for which consent is dubious, ambiguous or inadequately established and does not meet the legal definition of rape. The term was popularized by Laura Sessions Stepp in her viral 2007 Cosmopolitan article "A New Kind of Date Rape", which says gray rape is "somewhere between consent and denial and is even more confusing than date rape because often both parties are unsure of who wanted what". The term "gray rape" has been criticized. Lisa Jervis, founder of Bitch magazine, argued that gray rape and date rape "are the same thing" and that the popularization of the gray rape concept constituted a backlash against women's sexual empowerment and risked rolling back the gains women had made in having rape taken seriously.

Former chief of sex crimes for the Manhattan district attorney's office, Linda Fairstein, states that while "in the criminal justice system there's no such thing as gray rape, [it] is not a new term and not a new experience. For journalists, it may be, but for those of us who had worked in advocacy or law enforcement, this description of something being in a gray area has been around all the time." ConsentEd, a Canadian nonprofit sexual education foundation, dismisses the idea of gray rape, stating that in rape, perpetrators know exactly what they are doing; rape is not an accident.

== Terminology ==
The concept was mentioned in Katie Roiphe's 1994 book The Morning After: Sex, Fear and Feminism on Campus where she writes, "there is a gray area in which one person's rape may be another's bad night." Roiphe "...argued that college campus feminists' activism against rape infantilized women by redefining ambiguously coercive sexual encounters as rape"; she claims that "...contemporary feminists' widening of the definition of rape is a puritanical infantilization of women in the guise of progressive politics."

According to HuffPost writer Emma Gray, "gray sex" can be defined as "sex that feels violating even when it's not criminal"; Rachel Thompson states that "while these "experiences might not technically fall under a legal definition of sexual assault", we "...use the term 'grey area' because we do not currently have the terminology to describe these experiences." Elsie Whittington stated that this "...grey area is 'such a tricky topic' because 'we don't really have a language for talking about it.'"

Katrina Margolis states that there "...is a space that lies between rape and consensual sex that remains unnamed and undiscussed". Margolis states that when a woman has "...been drinking with a guy, and it gets past 2am, there is a certain expectation of sex if you end up together in a bedroom"; or, "after flirting, and inviting a guy home, I didn't exactly want to have sex, but it was easier [to say yes] than saying no, ... easier to just let it happen."

Ashley C. Ford described a female roommate's experience with her boyfriends, which she describes as "just lay there and let them do it", such as "...when you come home and you're drunk, or you're too tired, or you don't feel like it, but he's there and he wants to, so you just...kinda...let him". Ford "identified... the need for 'more definitive language' to facilitate nuanced conversations about the 'spectrum of harm' inflicted on women physically and psychologically as a result of these experiences".

In a New York Times article entitled When Saying 'Yes' Is Easier Than Saying 'No', Jessica Bennett describes the "complex situation" of sexual encounters "...you thought you wanted, or maybe you actually never wanted, but somehow here you are and it's happening and you desperately want out, but you know that at this point exiting the situation would be more difficult than simply lying there and waiting for it to be over. In other words: saying yes when we really mean no", which have been termed "the point of no return", "gray zone sex", "begrudgingly consensual sex", "lukewarm sex", and "bad sex", an expression in which "bad" refers "not to the perceived pleasure of it, but to the way you feel in the aftermath".

The term gray rape was used to describe the 1996 Brown University rape allegation involving students Adam Lack and Sara Klein. According to Lack he had consensual sex with Klein. Klein was apparently unaware the two had sex until days later after Lack asked about the experience. She said she did not remember the incident due to her consumption of alcohol, and five weeks later, filed charges. Lack said she not only gave consent, but was the one initiating and that he was unaware she was intoxicated. The charges were subsequently dropped, but Lack received academic discipline as a result.

Laura Sessions Stepp's Cosmopolitan article, A New Kind of Date Rape, argued that gray rape is sometimes related to use of drugs and alcohol. Reina Gattuso states that women have sexual "experiences that feel violating yet ambiguous", which "challenge us to think of violence as a spectrum of power and coercion, rather than a simple dichotomy between 'good sex' and 'rape'". Gattuso states that the "gray zone" "...idea has often functioned as a tactic to minimize or dismiss violence [in couples], and therefore evade accountability, by claiming that sex is inherently a murky, illegible realm".

Feminist magazine Bust defines the expression "gray zone" as "sex that isn't completely consensual, but isn't sexual assault" or as an "unwanted sexual experience". Amanda Sileo states that the "gray zone" was "...constructed by a society engulfed in rape culture and should not exist", because "open communication is missing from so many sexual encounters" and because "women feel too unsafe to speak up". Sileo states that "If you've ever tried to put your finger up a straight guy's ass during sex, you'll know that they actually understand ongoing consent, withdrawal of consent and sexual boundaries very well. They act confused when it's our [women's] bodies." Sileo states that during an encounter, "without the enthusiastic consent of your partner for a new sexual activity [when changing activities], you are no longer participating in consensual sex."

== Controversy and debate ==
The University of Florida stated that a "debate has erupted over a particular kind of encounter, one that may not be viewed as sexual assault but which constitutes something murkier than a bad date."

In 2014, Washington and Lee University expelled a student identified only as John Doe for what was described as "gray rape" after he allegedly raped a woman identified as Jane Doe. According to the claim, Jane met John at a party in February 2014 where the two had sex; she did not ask him to stop at the time, but later regretted it, reportedly after seeing him kiss another woman. In the summer of 2014 while working at a women's clinic that helps sexual assault victims, Jane spoke with staff and later reassessed the encounter as rape. Within 21 days John was expelled from Washington and Lee. John Doe later sued the school. In 2015, Washington and Lee filed to dismiss the lawsuit, but Judge Norman K. Moon denied the motion to dismiss allowing John Doe to continue seeking damages from his expulsion believing that John had been the wrongly accused of sexual misconduct. Washington and Lee University ended up settling out of court with the student.

Some reject the idea of gray rape, saying that it promotes the myth that rape can be an accident. They say that consent is consent, and there is no gray area between consent and lack of consent. In Sara Alcid's 2013 article "Navigating Consent: Debunking the 'Gray Area' Myth", she argues that the "gray area" around sex and consent that "...we have come to know as an inevitable part of sex and consent is a product of our culture's less than healthy or communicative approach to sex"; Alcid states that "women's outfits...are [wrongly] perceived as an invitation for sex or a signal of pre-consent"; "[f]lirting and acting romantically interested in someone is commonly interpreted [incorrectly] as a desire to have sex"; the incorrect belief that dating confers "a permanent state of consenting to sex", and argues that being able to consent while pressured or intoxicated is a myth.

== Responses ==
Susuana Amoah, who founded the I Heart Consent Campaign, has called for more consent education, including on boundaries: "To avoid grey areas, it's important that people of all ages are educated about what sexual consent means and are able to have informed wider discussions about coercion, body language and abuse of power."

Rachel Thompson has called for more "conversations of grey areas", noting the wide-ranging discussion over the short story "Cat Person" in New Yorker, which examined the "realm of bad sex" and the "reality of terrible sex and its emotional impact". Conor Friedersdorf stated that "singling out individuals"—like Aziz Ansari—is not an "effective" way to explore "these thorny, noncriminal, nonworkplace flaws in sexual culture." Friedersdorf stated that it may be better to discuss the fictional portrayals of sex in movies and TV shows.

Kate Margolis states that "[w]e need to get to the point where saying no is much, much easier. We need to make no-guilt-attached sexual refusal the norm" and it "should be easier to say, 'I don't really feel like having sex' without the addition of an adamant push, or a neighbor-alarming yell"; she says discussing these issues could "help men to distinguish between genuine enthusiasm and silent reluctance".

== See also ==
- False accusation of rape
- Unacknowledged rape
- Sexual misconduct
