= Date rape =

Form of acquaintance rape and dating violence

Date rape is a form of acquaintance rape and dating violence. The two phrases are often used interchangeably, but date rape specifically refers to a rape in which there has been some sort of romantic or potentially sexual relationship between the two parties. Acquaintance rape also includes rapes in which the victim and perpetrator have been in a non-romantic, non-sexual relationship, for example as co-workers or neighbors.

Since the 1980s, date rape has constituted the majority of rapes in some countries. It is particularly prevalent on college campuses, and frequently involves consumption of alcohol or other date rape drugs. The peak age for date rape victims is from the late teens to early twenties.

== Overview ==
A feature of date rape is that most victims are women, who know the perpetrators. The rape occurs when there is an actual or a potential romantic or sexual relationship, or when the relationship has come to an end. The perpetrator may force a victim to have sex against their will by physical or psychological intimidation. The perpetrator may also have sex with a victim incapable of consent, possibly due to drug or alcohol influence.

According to the United States Bureau of Justice Statistics (BJS), date rapes are among the most common forms of rape. Date rape most commonly takes place among college students when alcohol is involved or date rape drugs are taken. One of the most targeted groups are women between the ages of 16 and 24.

The phenomenon of date rape is relatively new. Historically, date rape has been considered less serious than rape by a stranger. Since the 1980s, it has constituted the majority of rapes in some countries. It has been increasingly seen as a problem involving society's attitude towards women and as a form of violence against women. It is controversial, however, with some people believing the problem is overstated and that many date rape victims are actually willing, consenting participants, and others believing that date rape is seriously underreported and almost all women who claim date rape were genuinely raped.

American researcher Mary Koss describes date rape as a specific form of acquaintance rape, in which there has been some level of romantic interest between the perpetrator and the victim, and in which sexual activity would have been generally seen as appropriate, if consensual. Acquaintance rape is a broader category than date rape, that can include many types of relationships including employer-employee, landlord-tenant, service provider-consumer, driver-hitchhiker, and rape among people who have a family relationship or who are neighbours.

In Sara Alcid's 2013 article "Navigating Consent: Debunking the 'Gray Area' Myth", she argues that dating is incorrectly believed to mean "a permanent state of consenting to sex".

== History ==
Since the final decades of the 20th century, in much of the world, rape has come to be broadly regarded as sexual intercourse (including anal or oral penetration) without a person's immediate consent, making rape illegal, including among people who know each other or who have previously had consensual sex. Some jurisdictions have specified that people debilitated by alcohol or other drugs are incapable of consenting to sex. Courts have also disagreed on whether consent, once given, can later be withdrawn. "Cultural and legal definitions of rape are always shaped by the relationships and status of those involved, a premise that holds both historically and cross-culturally."

Many societies rank the seriousness of a rape based on the relationship between the perpetrator and the victim. "An assault by a stranger is more likely to be seen as a 'real rape' than one by some-one known to the victim." Because of this cultural conception, many date rapes are considered to be less serious than stranger rapes because the nature of the perpetrator-victim relationship, especially for those who have had a prior or current sexual relationship.

== Use of term ==
The first appearance of the term date rape in a book was in 1975, in Against Our Will: Men, Women and Rape by American feminist journalist, author and activist Susan Brownmiller. The phrase appears in a few newspapers and journal articles earlier, but these had a more limited readership. The prominent feminist American-British lawyer Ann Olivarius helped popularize "date rape" in a series of public lectures at Yale University when she was an undergraduate to describe the strangulation and rape of a woman by a now-prominent gerontologist in California, Dr. Calvin Hirsch, to Yale's police department. In 1980 it was used in Mademoiselle magazine, in 1982 Ms. magazine published an article titled "Date Rape: A Campus Epidemic?", and in 1984 English novelist Martin Amis used the term in his novel Money: A Suicide Note. One of the earliest and most prominent date rape researchers is Mary Koss, who in 1987 conducted the first large-scale nationwide study on rape in the United States, surveying 7,000 students at 25 schools, and who is sometimes credited with originating the phrase date rape.

== Prevalence ==
The concept of date rape originated in the United States, where most of the research on date rape has been carried out. One out of every five teens are victims of date rape. Rape prevalence among women in the U.S. (the percentage of women who experienced rape at least once in their lifetime so far) is in the range of 15–20%, with different studies disagreeing with each other. An early 1987 study found that one in four American women will be the victim of a rape or attempted rape in her lifetime, and 84% of those will know their attacker. However, only 27% of American women whose sexual assault met the legal definition of rape think of themselves as rape victims, and only about 5% report their rape. One study of rape on American college campuses found that 13% of acquaintance rapes, and 35% of attempted acquaintance rapes, took place during a date, and another found that 22% of female rape victims had been raped by a current or former date, boyfriend or girlfriend, and another 20% by a spouse or former spouse. A 2007 American study found black non-Hispanic students were likeliest to be victims of dating violence, followed by Hispanic students and then white non-Hispanic students.

Rates of date rape are relatively low in Europe compared with the United States. The rate of reported rapes is much lower in Japan than the United States. In a 1993 paper German sociologist and criminologist Joachim Kersten suggested date rape may be less prevalent in Japan compared with the United States because Japanese culture puts a lesser emphasis on romantic love and dating, and because young Japanese people have less physical privacy than their American counterparts, and in her 2007 book Kickboxing Geishas: How Modern Japanese Women Are Changing Their Nation, American feminist Veronica Chambers questions whether date rape is under-reported in Japan because it is not yet understood there to be rape. In the 2011 book Transforming Japan: How Feminism and Diversity Are Making a Difference Japanese feminist Masaki Matsuda argued that date rape was becoming an increasing problem for Japanese college and high school students.

A 2007 study of attitudes towards rape among university students in South Korea found that date rape was "rarely recognized" as a form of rape, and that forced sex by a date was not viewed as traumatizing or criminal. Date rape is generally underreported in Vietnam. In 2012, 98% of reported rapes in India were committed by someone known to the victim.

== Victims ==
Researcher Mary Koss says the peak age for women being date raped is from their late teens to early twenties. Even though date rape is considered a hurtful, destructive and life-changing experience, research done by Mufson and Kranz showed that lack of support is a factor that determines the fragmented recovery of victims. They refused to disclose any information about the sexual assault to others, especially if they have experienced date or acquaintance rape due to self-humiliation and self-blame feelings.

However, there are several situational contexts where victims are able to seek for help or reveal the sexual assaults they have experienced. One act for disclosure can be provoked from the willing of preventing other people from being raped, in other words, speaking out. Also, a concern transmitted by the people surrounding the victim can lead into a confession of the assault, or within a situation in which alcohol is involved and that leads to recount the experience.

=== Minority group victims ===
Most of the research on sexual assault victims has been carried out with White-middle class population. However, the scale of date and acquaintance rape among the Black and Hispanic youth population is higher, and has its particular risk factors. A study conducted in 2013 indicated that sexual assault situations were greater among Hispanic (12.2%) and Black (11.5%) female high-school students than whites (9.1%).

== Effects ==
Date rape affects victims similarly to stranger rape, although the failure of others to acknowledge and take the rape seriously can make it harder for victims to recover. Rape crimes are more frequently perpetrated by people that the victims have confidence with and have known for quite some time. Nevertheless, some people's beliefs do not fit within the date rape scenario paradigm because they firmly prejudiced and stereotyped rape, victims and perpetrators. They tend to justify date rape and blame victims, particularly women victims, for the sexual assault by emphasizing the wearing of provocative clothing or the existence of a romantic relationship.

One of the main problems of date rape attributions is the type of relationship that the victim and the offender shared. The more intimate the relationship between both partners, the more probable that witnesses will consider the sexual assault as consensual rather than a serious incident.

== Perpetrators and motivations ==
A 2002 landmark study of undetected date rapists in Boston found that compared with non-rapists, rapists are measurably more angry at women and more motivated by a desire to dominate and control them, are more impulsive, disinhibited, antisocial, hypermasculine, and less empathic. The study found the rapists were extremely adept at identifying potential victims and testing their boundaries, and that they planned their attacks and used sophisticated strategies to isolate and groom victims, used violence instrumentally in order to terrify and coerce, and used psychological weapons against their victims including power, manipulation, control and threats. Date rapists target vulnerable victims, such as female freshmen who have less experience with drinking and are more likely to take risks, or people who are already intoxicated; they use alcohol as a weapon, as it makes the victim more vulnerable and impairs their credibility with the justice system should they choose to report the rape.

American clinical psychologist David Lisak, the study's author and an expert in date rape, says that serial rapists account for 90% of all campus rapes, with an average of six rapes each. Lisak argues that this and similar findings conflict sharply with the widely held view that college rapes are typically perpetrated by "a basically 'decent' young man who, were it not for too much alcohol and too little communication, would never do such a thing", with the evidence actually suggesting that the vast majority of rapes, including date rapes, are committed by serial, violent predators.

== Punishment ==
Date rape has a particular dynamic: the sexual assault happens on a date type of setting. Therefore, date rapes trials are considered inconclusive by nature and are charged with social concerns (e.g. gender roles, sexuality, body-shape). The criminal justice system urges the victim to describe the sexual assault in detail in order to be able to make a decision in court, ignoring the possibility that cross-examination can be a hostile and disturbing moment for the victim. Jurors’ personal beliefs and rape myth acceptance can be influential in their decision when it comes to evaluating the scenery, evidence, and making a sentence.

Research has found that jurors are more likely to convict in stranger rape cases than in date rape cases. Often, even in cases in which sufficient physical evidence is present to support conviction, juries have reported being influenced by irrelevant factors related to the female victim such as whether she used birth control, engaged in non-marital sex, was perceived by jurors as sexually dressed, or had engaged in alcohol or other drug use. Researchers have noted that because date rape by definition occurs in the context of a dating relationship, jurors' propensity to discount the likelihood of rape having occurred based on date-like behaviors is problematic. A 1982 American study of assignment of responsibility for rape found respondents were more likely to assign greater responsibility to a rape victim if she was intoxicated at the time of the rape; however, when her assailant was intoxicated, respondents assigned him less responsibility.

Some critics of the term date rape believe the distinction between stranger rape and date rape seems to position date rape as a lesser offence, which is insulting to date rape victims and could partly explain the lower conviction rates and lesser punishments of date rape cases.

== Prevention ==
David Lisak argues that prevention efforts aimed at persuading men not to rape are unlikely to work, and universities should instead focus on helping non-rapists to identify rapists and intervene in high-risk situations to stop them. Lisak also argues that whenever a nonstranger sexual assault is reported, it represents a window of opportunity for law enforcement to comprehensively investigate the alleged offender, rather than "putting blinders on looking solely on the alleged 45-minute interaction between these two people". Lisak believes rape victims should be treated with respect, and that every report of an alleged rape should trigger two simultaneous investigations: one into the incident itself, and a second into the alleged perpetrator to determine whether they are a serial offender.

Education programs are one way to prevent, protect, and raise awareness about rape and acquaintance rape. But these prevention programs do not have a huge impact. The combination of sexual harassment prevention tips, survival information and the psychosocial data gathered from women's assessment of date risks, make these programs focus on broad topics and do not emphasize specific and particular areas of date rape prevention. Future prevention programs should focus on engaging men, creating an open space for conversation and the possible recognition of holding gender bias beliefs and sexual behavior myths, which can lead them to promote sexual harassment behavior.

== In popular culture ==
Date rape was widely discussed on college campuses in North America during the 1980s but first attracted significant media attention in 1991, when an unnamed 29-year-old woman accused William Kennedy Smith, a nephew of former President John F. Kennedy, Senator Robert F. Kennedy, and Senator Ted Kennedy, of raping her on a nearby beach after meeting in a Florida bar. Millions of people watched the trial on television. Also in 1991, Katie Koestner came forward publicly about her own experience with date rape. Koestner was featured on the cover of Time magazine, appeared on shows such as Larry King Live and The Oprah Winfrey Show. Her efforts helped bring a human face to victims of date rape and helped bring the term into common use. Koestner was featured in a 1993 HBO special, No Visible Bruises: The Katie Koestner Story as part of the series, Lifestories: Families in Crisis.

Date rape received more media attention in 1992, when former boxer Mike Tyson was convicted of rape after inviting 18-year-old Desiree Washington to a party and then raping her in his hotel room.

== Controversies ==
In her 1994 book The Morning After: Sex, Fear, and Feminism, American author Katie Roiphe wrote about attending Harvard and Princeton in the late 1980s and early 1990s, amid what she described as a "culture captivated by victimization", and argued "If a woman's 'judgment is impaired' and she has sex, it isn't always the man's fault; it isn't necessarily always rape."

In 2007, American journalist Laura Sessions Stepp wrote an article for Cosmopolitan magazine titled "A New Kind of Date Rape", in which she popularized the term "gray rape" to refer to "sex that falls somewhere between consent and denial". The term was afterwards picked up and discussed by The New York Times, Slate, and PBS, and was criticized by many feminists, including Bitch founding editor Lisa Jervis, who argued that gray rape and date rape "are the same thing", and that the popularization of gray rape constituted a backlash against women's sexual empowerment and risked rolling back the gains women had made in having rape taken seriously.

== See also ==
- National Clearinghouse on Marital and Date Rape
- Types of rape
- Online dating service: safety issues
