= Gray sex =

Gray sex may refer to:

- Gray asexuality
- Gray rape
- Stag film, a form of monochrome pornography
