= Emily Carter =

American writer

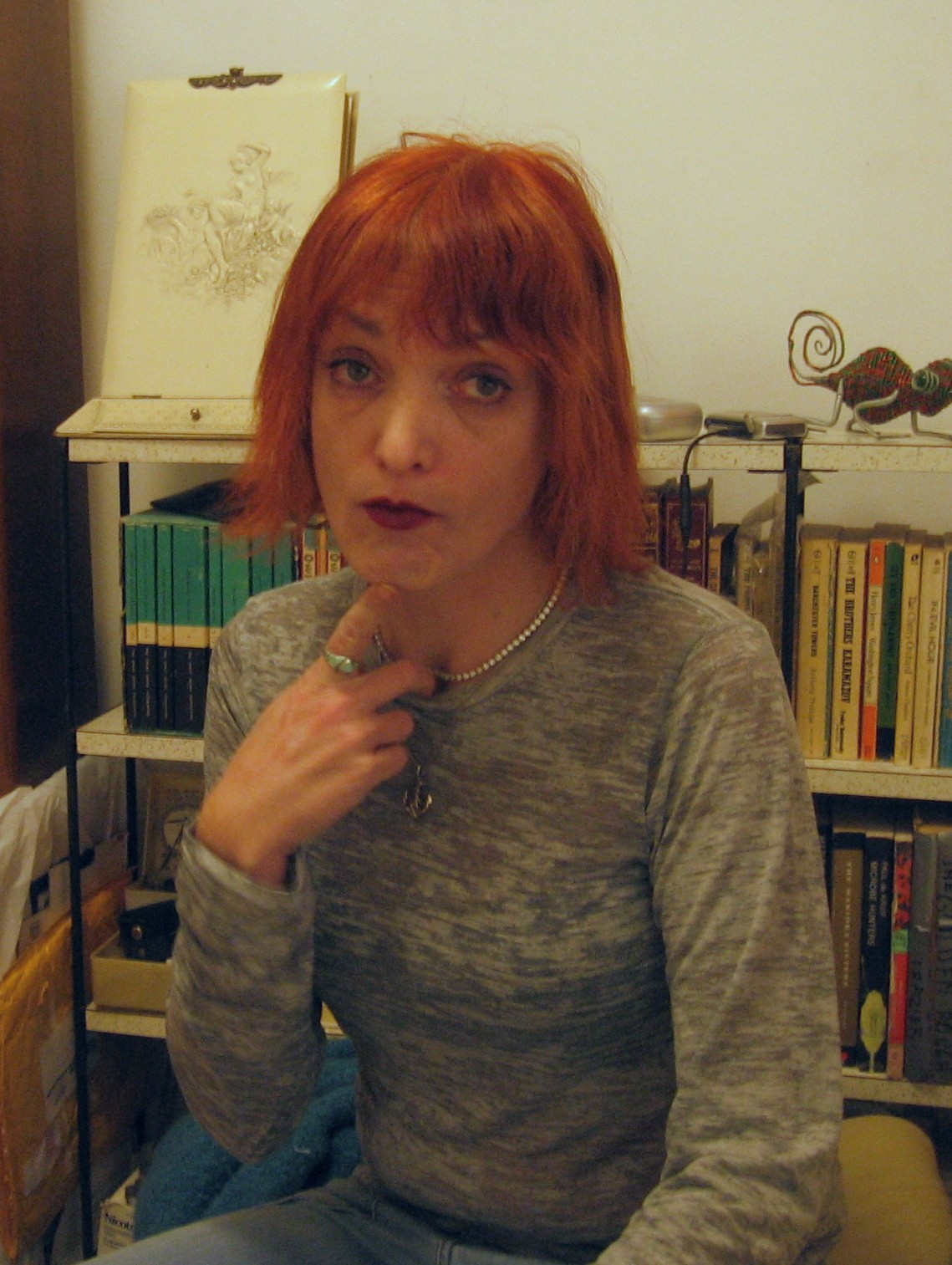
- Carter in 2010
- Born: December 15, 1960 (age 65); New York City, New York, U.S.
- Education: New York University
- Occupation: Writer
- Spouse: Johnnie Sage Ammentorp
- Parent(s): Anne Roiphe; Jack Richardson
- Family: Katie Roiphe (sister); Rebecca Roiphe (sister)

Emily Carter (born 15 December 1960) is an American writer of short stories and essays. Her work, often semi-autobiographical, explores themes of addiction, alienation, illness, and recovery.

== Biography ==
=== Early life and education ===
Carter is the daughter of feminist writer Anne Roiphe and playwright Jack Richardson. She was later adopted by her stepfather, psychoanalyst Herman Roiphe. She uses her middle name as her surname to distinguish herself from her mother's literary reputation. Her half-sisters are writer Katie Roiphe and lawyer Rebecca Roiphe.

Raised on Park Avenue in New York City, in what she later described as a “big, chaotic, wonderful house.” The family spent summers on Martha's Vineyard or Nantucket. Despite this privileged background, she struggled from an early age with feelings of loneliness and alienation. She was expelled from kindergarten for disruptive behavior and attended a series of private schools before graduating from the Robert Louis Stevenson School for Gifted Underachievers in New York City.

Carter exhibited an early gift for language, winning a school poetry prize even while bringing home poor grades. By the age of four she had begun seeing a psychologist, and throughout her childhood she experienced behavioral difficulties and recurring psychological issues.

She enrolled at New York University in 1978, but left after one semester. In the late 1970s and 1980s she became active in the East Village performance scene, reading prose poems at open-mic events and participating in the Neither/Nor gallery and performance space.

=== Addiction and health ===
As a teenager and young adult, Carter began drinking heavily and using drugs. She developed addictions to cocaine and heroin, at times supporting her habit through topless dancing and sex work. In the late 1980s her family intervened, arranging for her treatment at the Hazelden Foundation in Minnesota.

During a relapse, Carter learned that she was HIV-positive, likely contracted through intravenous drug use or sexual contact. She eventually achieved sobriety and settled in Saint Paul, Minnesota, where she lived in a sober boarding house and worked a series of jobs while continuing her recovery.

=== Writing career ===
Carter began publishing stories in the early 1990s, contributing to The Jailfish Review and later selling her work to The New Yorker. Her story Parachute Silk (1992) depicted the lives of addicts and was one of her first works to attract national attention. In 1998 her short story Glory Goes and Gets Some, first published in Open City, was selected for Best American Short Stories. She also placed work in Story, where editor Lois Rosenthal praised her fiction as inventive and emotionally affecting.

Her collection Glory Goes and Gets Some, published in 2000, received attention for its raw depiction of drug use, sexuality, and illness, presented through the lens of a semi-autobiographical protagonist, Glory. Critics noted her refusal to portray herself as a passive victim, instead emphasizing self-destructive agency and the stigmatization of people with HIV/AIDS.

=== Later life and work ===
Carter has worked as a community educator with the Minnesota AIDS Project, focusing on counseling and advocacy. She has continued to write fiction.

She was previously married to a teacher and cab driver; the marriage ended in divorce. She is married to punk rock musician Johnnie Sage Ammentorp, a fellow recovering addict.

== Awards ==
- 1996 McKnight Foundation Artist Fellowship for Writers Grant
- 1998 The Loft Literary Center Grant
- 2001 Whiting Award for Fiction

== Works ==
=== Books ===
- Glory Goes and Gets Some. Coffee House Press. 2000. ISBN 978-1-56689-101-1. "Emily Carter."
  - "Parachute Silk", Originally published in The New Yorker, July 27, 1992
  - "Bad Boy Walking", Originally published in The New Yorker, February 14, 1994
  - "WLUV", Reprinted in The Barcelona Review, July–August 2003

=== Anthologies ===
- Garrison Keillor; Katrina Kenison, eds. (1998). "Glory Goes and Gets Some". The Best American Short Stories. Houghton Mifflin. ISBN 978-0-395-87514-8.
