= Deborah Fry (academic) =

Social scientist and academic

Deborah Ann Fry
- Education: University of Edinburgh; Syracuse University; Columbia University
- Scientific career
- Workplaces: University of Edinburgh
- Thesis: Relationship Violence and Non-Partner Sexual Violence among Young People and Young Adults in New York City: Implications for Practice (2015)

Deborah Ann Fry is a social scientist and Professor of International Child Protection Research at the University of Edinburgh. She is Global Director of Data at the Global Child Safety Institute. Her research uses public health and epidemiological approaches to understand violence against children, particularly child sexual exploitation and abuse.

== Early life and education ==
Fry completed her Master of Arts at the Maxwell School of Citizenship and Public Affairs at Syracuse University. She moved to Columbia University for her graduate studies, earning a Masters of Public Health. Fry spent 2001 as a Fulbright Program scholar. Eventually Fry earned a doctorate through her research publications at the University of Edinburgh. Her doctorate examined sexual violence among young people in New York City.

== Research and career ==
Fry was Research Director at the New York City Alliance Against Sexual Assault. Here she examined sexual violence and abuse in New York City, including participatory action research involving immigrant communities and research with young people. She was awarded a Marie Curie Fellowship to conduct longitudinal research examining teacher knowledge, attitudes and self-efficacy in responding to bullying and safeguarding concerns in educational settings.

In 2013 Fry led the UNICEF and University of Edinburgh Multi-Country Study on the Drivers of Violence Affecting Children. She was made the University of Edinburgh's academic lead for a long-term agreement with UNICEF covering child protection research, administrative data and training. Through this partnership, Fry led studies commissioned by UNICEF offices internationally to investigate violence against children and inform evidence-based programming and policy development.

Fry is Professor of International Child Protection Research at the University of Edinburgh, where she conducts research on the prevalence, nature and drivers of violence against children. Her work examines how research evidence and administrative data can support child protection policies and interventions. She is Global Director of Data at Childlight, the Global Child Safety Institute. Childlight collects, analyses and presents evidence on the prevalence and nature of child sexual exploitation and abuse internationally, with the aim of informing child protection policies and interventions.

She has examined the rise of technology-facilitated child sexual exploitation and abuse in the United Kingdom. Fry found increasing circulation of child sexual abuse material online, emerging threats including sexual extortion, and gaps in national prevalence data. She found that between 2023 and 2025 AI-related child sexual abuse material had increased by more than 8,400%. Fry attributed this rise to technology-facilitated child sexual exploitation and abuse, alongside improved detection and reporting. She has argued for a public health approach to prevention, emphasising improved data collection, greater accountability for technology companies, stronger regulation and coordinated action across law enforcement, education, healthcare and child protection services.

Alongside prevalence, Fry has investigated the financial networks facilitating child sexual exploitation and abuse. She has demonstrated that online platforms, payment systems and cryptocurrencies enable a multibillion-dollar market in abusive material. Fry has called for a public health approach combining stronger regulation, financial oversight and preventive interventions.

== Select publications ==
- Deborah Fry; Xiangming Fang; Stuart Elliott; Tabitha Casey; Xiaodong Zheng; Jiaoyuan Li; Lani Florian; Gillean McCluskey (2017). "The relationships between violence in childhood and educational outcomes: A global systematic review and meta-analysis". Child Abuse & Neglect. 75: 6–28. doi:10.1016/j.chiabu.2017.06.021. PMID 28711191. Wikidata Q39436765.
- Dorothy Neriah Muraya; Deborah Fry (2015). "Aftercare Services for Child Victims of Sex Trafficking: A Systematic Review of Policy and Practice". Trauma. 17 (2): 204–220. doi:10.1177/1524838015584356. PMID 26025452. Wikidata Q35646720.
- Xiangming Fang; Deborah A Fry; Kai Ji; Finkelhor, David; Jingqi Chen; Patricia Lannen; Dunne, Michael (2015). "The burden of child maltreatment in China: a systematic review". Bulletin of the World Health Organization. 93 (3): 176-85C. doi:10.2471/blt.14.140970. PMC 4371492. PMID 25838613. Wikidata Q28087325.
