= Jiv =

Jiv or JIV may refer to:

- JIV, abbreviation for Journal of Interpersonal Violence,
- jiv, the ISO 639-3 code for the Shuar language
- jīv, the Sanskrit verb-root giving rise to Jiva, a living being, in Hinduism and Jainism
