= Craig Becker =

American labor attorney (born 1956)

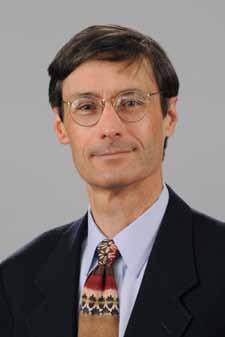
- Official portrait, 2010
- Born: November 14, 1956 (age 69)
- Education: Yale University (BA, JD)
- Occupation: Lawyer
- Spouse: Amy Dru Stanley
- Children: 2

Harold Craig Becker (born November 14, 1956), known professionally as Craig Becker, is an American labor attorney, a former member of the National Labor Relations Board, and the former General Counsel of the AFL-CIO. He is currently Managing Counsel for Affirmative Litigation at Democracy Defenders Fund.

== Early life and education ==
Craig Becker was born on November 14, 1956, to Ruth and Sam Becker; his mother, who had fled Nazi Germany through England in 1939, was a nurse and community activist, and his father was a World War II veteran who became a professor and chair of the Department of Communication Studies at the University of Iowa. Becker graduated from Yale University in 1978, and Yale Law School in 1981. He was an editor of the Yale Law Journal.

== Work experience (through 2009) ==
Becker clerked for Judge Donald P. Lay from 1981 through 1983. He then worked at Kirschner, Weinberg & Dempsey (1983–1989), a law firm located in Washington, D.C., and represented members of the American Federation of State County and Municipal Employees and its affiliates, including the Harvard Union of Clerical and Technical Workers. He was a faculty member at UCLA Law School (1989–1994) and has also taught at Georgetown University Law School (1987–1988, 2012) and the University of Chicago Law School (1994–1995) and at Yale Law School as an Irving S. Ribicoff Visiting Lecturer every other year since 2016. He has been Associate General Counsel to the AFL–CIO and the Service Employees International Union (SEIU). He served as General Counsel of the AFL-CIO from 2012 to 2022, and then Senior Counsel from 2022 to 2025. He is now Managing Counsel for Affirmative Litigation at Democracy Defenders Fund. Throughout his career, he has argued many cases in courts nationwide, including in front of the Supreme Court of the United States. In 2009, he was a member of the Obama transition team, assisting with the review of the United States Department of Labor.

== Appointment ==
Becker was nominated by President Barack Obama for a seat on the National Labor Relations Board; a 13–10 vote by a Senate panel on February 4, 2010 allowed his nomination to move to the Senate floor. However, his nomination failed to move to a floor vote on a vote of 52-33, falling eight short of the votes needed to block a Republican filibuster. On March 27, 2010, President Obama made a recess appointment of Becker to the National Labor Relations Board. The president's action enabled Becker to serve without Senate confirmation until the chamber adjourned in January 2012.

On January 26, 2011, Obama renominated Becker to the same seat, which was to expire in December 2014. However, Becker's nomination remained stalled in the Senate, and with Becker's recess appointment drawing to a close, Obama withdrew the nomination on December 15, 2011. As such, Becker's term on the board ended at the end of December 2011. His recess appointment was upheld, under Noel Canning, by the U.S. Court of Appeals for the District of Columbia Circuit in 2014. After leaving the National Labor Relations Board, he taught at Georgetown Law School and then was named General Counsel of the AFL–CIO.

== Personal life ==
Becker resides in Washington, D.C., with his wife, Amy Dru Stanley, a history professor at the University of Chicago. He has two sons.
