= Jack Richardson (writer) =

American dramatist

Jack Carter Richardson
- Born: 18 February 1934
- Died: July 1, 2012 (aged 78)
- Occupation: Writer
- Spouse(s): Anne Roth (divorced); Judith Heidler (divorced); Susan E. Morse
- Children: with Roth: Emily Carter with Morse: Dwight Richardson

Jack Carter Richardson (18 February 1934, Manhattan, NY, US – 1 July 2012, Manhattan, NY, US) was an American writer born in Manhattan, though his birthplace has been erroneously reported as Bristol, Virginia. He was known for his existentialist dramas of the early 1960s.

== Biography ==
Raised in the Jackson Heights section of Queens, New York City, the son of Arthur Richardson, a piano player during Prohibition who co-wrote "Too Fat Polka (She's Too Fat for Me)". After his mother died and his father remarried, he was raised by his grandmother. He graduated from Collegiate High School in Manhattan. Richardson later served in the Counter Intelligence Corps (CIC) in the United States Army during the Korean War. He then earned a bachelor's degree in philosophy from Columbia University and studied at LMU Munich. In 1960, The Prodigal, his first play, a retelling of the story of Orestes, was produced Off-Broadway to critical acclaim, winning an Obie Award and a Drama Desk Award. Gallows Humor, a 1961 combination of two short plays, was well-received. Producer, William T. Gardner, staged its production at the Academy Playhouse in Lake Forest, Illinois in the late summer of 1973. Richardson's next two plays, Lorenzo (1963) and Xmas in Las Vegas (1965), were produced on Broadway but were critical and commercial failures.

From the 1960s, Richardson wrote dramatic criticism and essays for The New York Times, New York Review of Books, Esquire, and Commentary, as well as two novels, The Prison Life of Harris Filmore (1965) and Memoir of a Gambler (1980).

== Personal life ==
Richardson married author Anne Roth (now Anne Roiphe) in 1957, and they had a daughter Emily Carter. The couple later divorced. Richardson's second wife was Judith Heidler (later Judith Silvia); they also divorced. She became executive director of the Newport Art Association and Museum and later a consultant to Green Collections in Yokohama, Japan. Richardson then married Susan E. Morse, an Academy Award-nominated feature film editor best known for her work with Woody Allen. and, in 2012, for her editing of the popular FX Network show, "Louie," written and directed by and starring Louis C.K., for which Morse was nominated for an Emmy. Richardson and Morse had a son named Dwight, and the marriage lasted until Richardson died in Manhattan in July 2012.
