= Andi Zeisler =

American journalist (born c. 1972)

- Education: Colorado College (BA)
- Occupations: Writer, journalist
- Known for: Co-founder of Bitch Media

Andi Zeisler (born c. 1972) is an American writer and co-founder of Bitch Media, a nonprofit feminist media organization based in Portland, Oregon, United States.

== Biography ==
Zeisler was born in New York. In 1994, Zeisler graduated from the Colorado College with a BA in fine art. After graduation, she moved with high school friend Lisa Jervis to Oakland and began making plans for their own zine when Sassy magazine was purchased by another publisher. Sassy's change in focus led the pair to believe there was a niche they could fill.

In 1996, Zeisler and Jervis co-founded Bitch magazine as an all-volunteer zine with a circulation of three hundred copies. In 1998, the pair began to grow the magazine into a quarterly publication with help from the Independent Press Association. It was later an internationally distributed with a circulation of more than fifty thousand. Bitch Media's mission was to provide and encourage an engaged feminist response to pop culture. In 2007, the magazine was moved to Portland and in 2009 rebranded as Bitch Media. It later ceased publication in 2022.

Zeisler's writing, which focuses mainly on feminist interpretations of popular culture, has been featured in a variety of publications including Mother Jones, the San Francisco Chronicle, and Ms.

Zeisler's 2016 book, We Were Feminists Once: From Riot Grrrl to Covergirl®, the Buying and Selling of a Political Movement, examines marketplace feminism (the appropriation of feminist messaging as a marketing strategy), and relationships between pop culture and feminist challenges to power through activism.

== Published works ==
- BitchFest: 10 Years of Cultural Criticism from the Pages of Bitch Magazine. Published in 2006, BitchFest is a compilation of memorable articles from Bitch Magazine throughout its ten years of circulation.
- Feminism and Pop Culture: Seal Studies. Published in 2008, the book follows the impact of feminism on pop culture.
- We Were Feminists Once: From Riot Grrrl to CoverGirl®, the Buying and Selling of a Political Movement. May, 2016 from PublicAffairs, We Were Feminists Once explores the commercial co-optation of feminism.
