= Rebecca Roiphe =

U.S. lawyer and legal historian

- Parent(s): Anne Roiphe (mother); Herman Roiphe (father)
- Relatives: Emily Carter (sister); Katie Roiphe (sister)

Academic background
- Education: Columbia University; Harvard Law School; University of Chicago
- Doctoral advisor: Amy Dru Stanley

Academic work
- Discipline: Legal ethics and history
- Institutions: New York Law School

Rebecca Roiphe is an American lawyer and legal historian specializing in ethics and the history of the legal profession.

== Life ==
Roiphe was born to novelist Anne Roiphe and psychoanalyst Herman Roiphe. She completed a B.A. in American literature and history from Columbia University in June 1993. She was a summer associate at Hill and Barlow, Paul, Weiss, Rifkind, Wharton & Garrison, and Debevoise & Plimpton in 1998, 1999, and 2000 respectively. She earned a J.D., cum laude, from Harvard Law School in June 2000. From 2000 to 2001, she clerked for Bruce M. Selya of the United States Court of Appeals for the First Circuit. From January to July 2002, Roiphe was an associate in the litigation department at Wilmer Cutler, & Pickering.

In June 2002, Roiphe completed a Ph.D. in American history from the University of Chicago. Her M.A. thesis was titled Reforming Women: Science, Maternalism, and the Treatment of Delinquent Girls in the 1920s. Roiphe's dissertation was titled Law and the Modern Soul, 1870–1930. Amy Dru Stanley, Jan Goldstein, George Chauncey served on her dissertation committee.

From July 2002 to July 2005, Roiphe was an assistant district attorney in the securities fraud unit at the New York County District Attorney's office. In 2004, she married Benjamin Gruenstein, an assistant United States attorney for the District Court for the Southern District of New York. Roiphe was a visiting assistant professor at the Fordham University School of Law from 2005 to 2007. She joined the faculty of the New York Law School in 2007. She is the Joseph Solomon Distinguished Professor of Law and co-dean for faculty scholarship. She specializes in ethics and the history of the legal profession.
