= Unacknowledged rape =

Rape not considered as such by the victim

Unacknowledged rape is defined as a sexual experience that meets the legal definition of rape, but is not labeled as rape by the victim, either at the time or afterward. This response is more frequently recognized among victims of acquaintance rape, date rape or marital rape.

== Historic roots ==
The definition of rape has varied across time and cultures.

In 2013, the legal definition in the U.S. changed to “Penetration, no matter how slight, of the vagina or anus with any body part or object, or oral penetration by a sex organ of another person, without the consent of the victim.”

Advocates against sexual assault argued that rape does not just occur by strangers, but may also involve acquaintances, partners, friends, and potentially even family members. Despite this social evolution, many victims still fail to acknowledge their experience as an assault.

== Prevalence ==
According to a 2015 study of 5,917 female victims, 60.4% of those that experienced sexual victimization did not acknowledge it as rape. Sexual assault and rape are extremely prevalent gender crimes with approximately 1 in 6 American women having experienced completed rape or attempted rape. Different situations warrant different likelihoods of acknowledged rape. A victim is much more likely to acknowledge a rape if the perpetrator was a stranger or somebody with whom they have a platonic relationship. The rate of acknowledgement is typically lower if the perpetrator is somebody that the victim was once or currently romantically involved with.

== Explanations ==
=== Sexual scripts ===
Research suggests that women have a difficult time acknowledging date or partner rape due to previously learned sexual or rape scripts. Sexual scripts are stereotypes told about sexual experience, which can limit understandings of assault. These scripts can be held at a cultural level, interpersonal level, or intrapersonal level.

=== Previous sexual abuse ===
Some research suggests that there is correlation between unacknowledged rape and childhood sexual abuse. Childhood sexual abuse is linked to many long-term issues in many areas of life. Some believe that sexual scripts begin to develop during adverse childhood experiences. CSA is often linked to guilt, sexual permissiveness, and the self-perception of being promiscuous. Although there are no conclusive case studies, this is a factor that can be taken into account.

=== Counterfactual thinking ===
Counterfactual thinking occurs when an individual mentally morphs, restructures, or changes events. It is possible that unacknowledged rape victims use counterfactual thinking to cognitively reorganize the experience into something other than rape. Victims that exhibit counterfactual thinking typically reorganize their thought patterns by thinking of ways the situation could have been worse. Others think about ways they could have prevented the situation from occurring instead of thinking about the experience itself.

=== Relationship to perpetrator ===
Individuals who are raped by strangers are more likely to acknowledge their status as a rape victim. Conversely, individuals who are raped by acquaintances, friends, or significant others are more likely to be unacknowledged rape victims. Approximately 2/3 of assaults are committed by someone who knows the victim and 38% of assaults are committed by a friend of the victim. Acquaintance rape is highly prevalent and represents the majority of sexual assault cases. Therefore, a majority of victims are at an increased likelihood of being unacknowledged.

=== Drug and alcohol use ===
If an individual is willingly under the influence of alcohol or drugs, they are less likely to acknowledge the event as a rape. One study found that less than 10% of women who were intoxicated acknowledged their experience as rape. Another study found that over 50% of unacknowledged victims report being under the influence of alcohol or drugs at the time of the event while only approximately 25% of acknowledged victims report being impaired by a substance.

== Legal and other issues ==
Unacknowledged rapes can skew the validity of statistics regarding criminal behavior. Reputable reports such as the FBI violent crime report rely upon crimes reported to law enforcement to construct their statistics. A recent study estimated that 734,630 people were raped in the year of 2018. However, the crime must be reported to be included in this report. Only 230 out of every 1,000 rapes are reported to law enforcement officials. If a victim does not acknowledge the assault, they do not acknowledge that a crime has been committed against them. If there is no crime, there is nothing to report to the police. For this reason, it is understood that such reports underestimate the prevalence of sex crimes. Studies regarding unacknowledged rape also call into question whether or not the current line of communication between victim and law enforcement officer yields the most success. When investigating reported assaults, the protocol is for the officer to ask, "Were you raped?" However, it has been found that people reporting rapes respond better to behaviorally descriptive questions such as "Did the perp (insert action) without your consent?". Unfortunately, not acknowledging a rape makes it much harder to prosecute. If a rape eventually becomes acknowledged and a report is made, the report is considered delayed. A delayed report makes conducting an examination for a rape kit impossible. Because jurors can also hold rape myths, a delayed report is often viewed in a negative light.

== After effects ==
There is inconclusive evidence regarding the effects of a rape that remains unacknowledged. Those who do not acknowledge their assaults often face similar issues to those who do acknowledge their assaults. Unacknowledged rape victims face a higher likelihood of re-victimization, especially in the case of a date rape where the victim holds a continued relationship with the assailant. Lower risk detection capacities and higher alcohol consumption are associated with unaddressed rapes. It has been found that the more time that passes, the more likely a victim is to acknowledge their rape. The prevalence of PTSD is where evidence is rendered inconclusive. Some studies report lower PTSD levels in comparison to victims who have acknowledged their rape, while others report the same or higher levels.

== See also ==
- Gray rape
