= Amy Dru Stanley =

American historian

- Spouse: Craig Becker
- Children: 2
- Awards: Frederick Jackson Turner Award (1999)

Academic background
- Education: Princeton University (BA); Yale University (PhD)

Academic work
- Discipline: American history, women's history
- Sub-discipline: Emancipation, labor issues
- Institutions: University of California, Irvine; University of Chicago
- Doctoral students: Rebecca Roiphe

Amy Dru Stanley is an American historian of American history, women's history, and emancipation.

== Biography ==
She graduated from Princeton University and from Yale University with a Ph.D. She taught at the University of California, Irvine. She teaches at the University of Chicago.

She studies American history, centering on women, emancipation, and labor issues. She recently won a Quantrell Award from the University of Chicago for excellence in undergraduate teaching.

On Valentine's Day, 1985 she was arrested, along with a group of local scholars and Stevie Wonder, during a protest against apartheid at the South African embassy in Washington, D.C.

She is married to Craig Becker, who is the Co-General Counsel of the AFL-CIO, and resides in Washington, DC with him and their two sons.

== Awards ==
- 1999 Frederick Jackson Turner Award
- 1999 Morris D. Forkosch Award
- 1999 Avery O. Craven Award
- 1999 Frederick Douglass Prize, Honorable Mention
- 2009 Quantrell Award

== Publications ==
- Stanley, Amy Dru (1998), "From bondage to contract: wage labor, marriage and the market", in Stanley, Amy Dru (ed.), The age of slave emancipation, Cambridge University Press, ISBN 9780521635264. Preview.
- Stanley, Amy Dru (2002), "Marriage, property, and class", in Hewitt, Nancy A. (ed.), A companion to American women's history, Wiley-Blackwell, ISBN 9780631212522. Preview.
- Stanley, Amy Dru (1998), "The right to possess the faculties that God has given: possessive individualism, slave women, and abolitionist thought", in Halttunen, Karen; Perry, Lewis (eds.), Moral problems in American life: new perspectives on cultural history, Cornell University Press, ISBN 9780801483509. Preview.
- Stanley, Amy Dru (1997), "Conjugal bonds and wage labor: the rights of contract in the age of emancipation", in Maschke, Karen J. (ed.), Women and the American legal order, Taylor & Francis, ISBN 9780815325154. Preview.
- Stanley, Amy Dru (June 2010). "Instead of waiting for the Thirteenth Amendment: the war power, slave marriage, and inviolate human rights". The American Historical Review. 115 (3): 732–765. doi:10.1086/ahr.115.3.732. JSTOR 10.1086/ahr.115.3.732. Pdf.
