= Recess appointment =

Appointment by the president of a federal official when the U.S. Senate is in recess

A recess appointment is an appointment made by the president of the United States to fill a vacancy in a federal office when the U.S. Senate is in recess, without the Senate's advice and consent. Under the U.S. Constitution's Recess Appointments Clause (Article II, Section 2, Clause 3, see text below), a recess appointment expires at the end of the Senate's next session unless the appointee is confirmed by the Senate.

The recess appointment power was intended to ensure the continuity of government when the Senate was unavailable for extended periods, but has become increasingly controversial in modern practice as the Senate has remained in near-continuous session and used pro forma sessions to prevent recess appointments. The practice has been used by presidents since George Washington, including for judicial appointments, and has been the subject of recurring constitutional and political disputes.

In NLRB v. Noel Canning (2014), the Supreme Court held that pro forma sessions are sufficient to prevent recess appointments and that the president may make recess appointments during both intersession and sufficiently long intrasession recesses.

== Constitutional text ==
According to Article II, Section 2, Clause 3 of the Constitution, the president can appoint or fill up the vacancies that happen during a recess without the Senate's approval, but those positions will end at the end of the next legislative session unless Congress approves the appointment:

The President shall have power to fill up all vacancies that may happen during the recess of the Senate, by granting commissions which shall expire at the end of their next session.

== History ==
Presidents since George Washington have made recess appointments. Washington appointed South Carolina judge John Rutledge as Chief Justice of the United States during a congressional recess in 1795. Because of Rutledge's political views and occasional mental illness, however, the Senate rejected his nomination, and Rutledge attempted suicide and resigned. Almost every president has used recess appointments to appoint judges, over 300 such judicial recess appointments before 2000, including ten Supreme Court justices.

New Jersey judge William J. Brennan was appointed to the Supreme Court by President Dwight D. Eisenhower in 1956 by a recess appointment. This was done in part with an eye on the presidential campaign that year; Eisenhower was running for reelection, and his advisors thought it would be politically advantageous to place a northeastern Catholic on the court. Brennan was promptly confirmed when the Senate came back into session. Eisenhower, in a recess appointment, also designated Charles W. Yost as United States Ambassador to Syria. Eisenhower made two other recess appointments, Chief Justice Earl Warren and Associate Justice Potter Stewart.

As reported by Adam Serwer, writing for Mother Jones, the Congressional Research Service (CRS) tallied

President Ronald Reagan ma[king] 240 recess appointments [during his time in office], [and] President George H. W. Bush ma[king] 77 recess appointments....

George H. W. Bush appointed Lawrence Eagleburger as Secretary of State during a recess in 1992; Eagleburger, as Deputy Secretary of State, had in effect filled that role after James Baker resigned.

Henry B. Hogue, a specialist in American national government, summarised the next presidents for the CRS, stating

President William J. Clinton made 139 recess appointments [during his presidency], 95 to full-time positions and 44 to part-time positions. President George W. Bush made 171 recess appointments, 99 to full-time positions and 72 to part-time positions.

During the last two years of the Bush administration, Democratic Senate Majority Leader Harry Reid sought to prevent recess appointments. Bush promised not to make any during the August recess that year, but no agreement was reached for the two-week Thanksgiving break in November 2007. As a result, Reid did not allow adjournments of more than three days from then until the end of the Bush presidency by holding pro forma sessions. Prior to this, there had been speculation that James W. Holsinger would receive a recess appointment as Surgeon General of the United States.

President Barack Obama made 32 recess appointments (through February 1, 2015), all to full-time positions. Over what would have traditionally been the 2011–12 winter recess of the 112th Congress, the Republican-controlled House of Representatives did not assent to recess, specifically to block Richard Cordray's appointment as Director of the Consumer Financial Protection Bureau. Both the House and Senate continued to hold pro forma sessions.

In August 2017, nine pro forma sessions were set up to block President Donald Trump from making recess appointments; the concern was that Trump might dismiss Attorney General Jeff Sessions, and try to name his successor while Congress was in recess. Pro forma sessions continued to be held until January 2019: they were held on December 31, 2018, and again on January 2, 2019, the last full day of the 115th United States Congress, that lasted several minutes.

On April 15, 2020, while Congress was holding pro forma sessions due to the recess during the COVID-19 pandemic, President Trump threatened to adjourn both houses of Congress in order to make recess appointments for vacant positions such as the Federal Reserve Board of Governors and the Director of National Intelligence. However, the U.S. Constitution only grants the president the authority to adjourn Congress if it is unable to agree on a date of adjournment, and both Speaker of the House Nancy Pelosi and Senate Majority Leader Mitch McConnell indicated that they would not alter the planned date of January 3, 2021.

== Congressional action to prevent recess appointments ==
The Senate or House may seek to block potential recess appointments by not allowing the Senate to adjourn under Article 1, Section 5, Clause 4 of the Constitution, which provides that both Houses must consent to an adjournment. This tactic is especially used when either House of Congress is controlled by a different party than that of the president, the Senate or House may seek to block potential recess appointments by not allowing the Senate to adjourn for more than three days, blocking a longer adjournment that would allow recess appointments to be made.

In order to combat this tactic from Congress, the president can adjourn Congress under Article II section 3 of the Constitution, which states:

He shall from time to time give to the Congress information of the state of the union, and recommend to their consideration such measures as he shall judge necessary and expedient; he may, on extraordinary occasions, convene both Houses, or either of them, and in case of disagreement between them, with respect to the time of adjournment, he may adjourn them to such time as he shall think proper; he shall receive ambassadors and other public ministers; he shall take care that the laws be faithfully executed, and shall commission all the officers of the United States. [emphasis added]

=== Legality of intra-session appointments ===
As noted by D.R. Stras and R.W. Scott, writing in 2007 in the Northwestern University Law Review, "there is a robust debate in the scholarly literature about the meaning of the Recess Appointments Clause." In Federalist No. 67, Alexander Hamilton wrote:

The ordinary power of appointment is confined to the President and Senate jointly, and can therefore only be exercised during the session of the Senate; but as it would have been improper to oblige this body to be continually in session for the appointment of officers and as vacancies might happen in their recess, which it might be necessary for the public service to fill without delay.

Michael B. Rappaport, writing in 2005 in the UCLA Law Review, argues for a revised understanding of the meaning of the word "recess" in the Clause, and that it permits appointments "only when an office becomes vacant during a recess and when the... appointment is made during that recess"; he goes on to state that "if an office is vacant while the Senate is in session, the Constitution expects the President to make an advice and consent appointment at that time."

Historically, presidents tended to make recess appointments when the Senate was adjourned for lengthy periods. Since World War II, presidents have sometimes made recess appointments when Senate opposition appeared strong in the hope that appointees might prove themselves in office and then allow opposition to dissipate.

According to Henry B. Hogue, writing for the Congressional Research Service:

Recent Presidents have made both intersession and intrasession recess appointments [those between sessions/Congresses and those within sessions, respectively]. Intrasession recess appointments were unusual, however, prior to the 1940s, in part because intrasession recesses were less common at that time. Intrasession recess appointments have sometimes provoked controversy in the Senate, and some academic literature also has called their legitimacy into question. Legal opinions have also varied on this issue over time.

Others argue that recess appointments were to be made only during inter-session recesses, which during the early days of the country lasted between six and nine months, and were therefore required to prevent important offices from remaining unfilled for long periods. The view holds that the current interpretation allows appointments to be made during recesses too brief to justify bypassing the Senate.

Most recently, however, as partisanship on Capitol Hill has grown, recess appointments have tended to solidify opposition to the appointee.

=== Obama's challenge ===
Regardless of the Senate continuing to hold pro forma sessions, on January 4, 2012, President Obama appointed Richard Cordray and others as recess appointments. White House Counsel Kathryn Ruemmler asserted that the appointments were valid, because the pro forma sessions were designed to, "through form, render a constitutional power of the executive obsolete" and that the Senate was for all intents and purposes recessed. Republicans in the Senate disputed the appointments, with Senate Minority Leader Mitch McConnell stating that Obama had "arrogantly circumvented the American people" with the appointments. It was expected that there would be a legal challenge to the appointments.

On January 6, 2012, the Department of Justice Office of Legal Counsel issued an opinion regarding recess appointments and pro forma sessions, claiming,

"The convening of periodic pro forma sessions in which no business is to be conducted does not have the legal effect of interrupting an intrasession recess otherwise long enough to qualify as a "Recess of the Senate" under the Recess Appointments Clause. In this context, the President therefore has discretion to conclude that the Senate is unavailable to perform its advise-and-consent function and to exercise his power to make recess appointments".

=== Judicial challenges ===
However, this was widely disputed. The first such challenge was announced in April 2012, disputing a National Labor Relations Board ruling made following the Obama appointments.

On January 25, 2013, in the first circuit case to rule on the validity of the January 4, 2012, appointments, Chief Judge David Sentelle, writing for a unanimous three-judge panel for the U.S. Court of Appeals for the D.C. Circuit, wrote

"an interpretation of 'the Recess' that permits the President to decide when the Senate is in recess would demolish the checks and balances inherent in the advice-and-consent requirement, giving the President free rein to appoint his desired nominees at any time he pleases, whether that time be a weekend, lunch, or even when the Senate is in session and he is merely displeased with its inaction. This cannot be the law."

Also, on March 16, 2013, the Third Circuit joined the D.C. Circuit and held that the March 2010 appointment of Craig Becker to the NLRB was invalid because he was not appointed between sessions.

On June 26, 2014, in a 9–0 ruling on the case of NLRB v. Noel Canning, the United States Supreme Court validated this practice of using pro forma sessions to block the president from using the recess appointment authority. Justice Stephen Breyer wrote that the Constitution allows for the Congress itself to determine its sessions and recesses, that "the Senate is in session when it says it is", and that the President does not have the unilateral right to dictate Congressional sessions and thus make recess appointments. However, the decision allows the use of recess appointments during breaks within a session for vacancies that existed prior to the break. Justice Breyer also noted that the president could force a recess if he had enough congressional support:

"The Constitution also gives the President (if he has enough allies in Congress) a way to force a recess. Art. II, §3 ('[I]n Case of Disagreement between [the Houses], with Respect to the Time of Adjournment, [the President] may adjourn them to such Time as he shall think proper'). Moreover, the president and Senators engage with each other in many different ways [*28] and have a variety of methods of encouraging each other to accept their points of view. Regardless, the Recess Appointments Clause is not designed to overcome serious institutional friction. It simply provides a subsidiary method for appointing officials when the Senate is away during a recess."

== See also ==
- List of positions filled by presidential appointment with Senate confirmation
- Unsuccessful recess appointments to United States federal courts
- Federal Vacancies Reform Act of 1998
- The dictionary definition of recess appointment at Wiktionary
