= Laura Sessions Stepp =

American author and journalist (1951–2025)

- Born: Laura Elizabeth Sessions; July 27, 1951; Fort Smith, Arkansas, U.S.
- Died: February 24, 2025 (aged 73); Springfield, Virginia, U.S.
- Education: Earlham College (BA); Columbia University (MA)
- Occupations: Journalist; editor; author
- Spouses: Robert King (divorced); Carl Stepp (m. 1981)
- Children: 1

Laura Sessions Stepp (born Laura Elizabeth Sessions; July 27, 1951 – February 24, 2025) was an American author and journalist.

== Background ==
Laura Elizabeth Sessions was born in Fort Smith, Arkansas, on July 27, 1951. After her parents divorced, she was raised primarily by her father, a Methodist pastor, and her stepmother. Her father was an outspoken opponent of segregation, which once led to a cross burning on his front yard. The family later moved and eventually settled in Buckhannon, West Virginia. She obtained her bachelor's degree from Earlham College, and then received a master's degree in journalism from Columbia University.

== Career ==
She worked briefly as a television weather presenter before becoming a reporter for The Palm Beach Times and the Philadelphia Bulletin. She then went to The Charlotte Observer; there, she was part of a group of reporters and editors who produced the report "A Case of Deadly Neglect" on brown lung disease. The report won the 1981 Pulitzer Prize for Public Service. That year, she married Carl Stepp, a journalism professor; they combined their surnames upon marriage. A previous marriage to Robert King ended in divorce. In 1982, she joined the editorial staff of The Washington Post.

Sessions Stepp became known for her studies of American teen culture. In 1998, she began reporting on changes in sexual practices among teenagers. In 2000, she published the book Our Last Best Shot, an exploration of American adolescents. In 2006, she published the book Unhooked, a critique of hookup culture among teenagers, in which she expressed concern over its potential effects on girls and young women, asking whether it was "contributing to – or destroying – their sense of self-worth and strength". The New York Times noted that some dismissed her as a "prudish alarmist", though she said, "I am not saying, 'Have less sex'. I am saying, 'Have more romance'".

Sessions Stepp took a buyout from the Post in 2008.

== Personal life and death ==
Carl and Laura Sessions Stepp had a son, and she became a stepmother to his two daughters from a prior marriage. She attended Methodist and Lutheran churches during her adult life.

Sessions Stepp died from Alzheimer's disease at a care facility in Springfield, Virginia, on February 24, 2025, at the age of 73.
