= Anne Roiphe =

American novelist

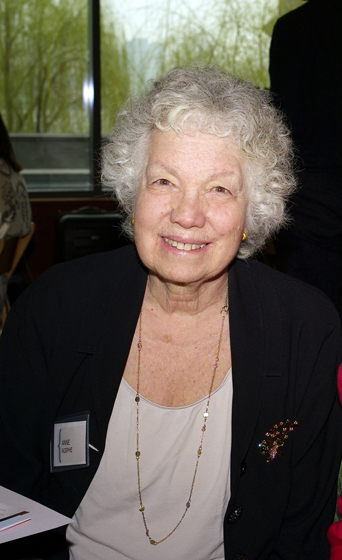
- Anne Roiphe at the Jewish Women's Archive awards luncheon in 2012
- Born: Anne Roth; December 25, 1935 (age 90); New York City, U.S.
- Occupations: Novelist; non-fiction writer; essayist
- Spouse(s): Jack Richardson; Dr. Herman Roiphe
- Children: Emily Carter; Katie Roiphe; Rebecca Roiphe
- Writing career
- Period: 1967—present
- Notable works: Up the Sandbox (1970), Fruitful: A Memoir (1996)

Anne Roiphe (born December 25, 1935) is an American writer and journalist. She is best known as a first-generation feminist and author of the novel Up the Sandbox (1970), filmed as a starring vehicle for Barbra Streisand in 1972. In 1996, Salon called the book "a feminist classic."

== Background and education ==
Roiphe was born and raised in a Jewish family in New York City. She graduated from the Brearley School in 1953 and received her Bachelor of Arts from Sarah Lawrence College in 1957. Roiphe is also a cousin of controversial attorney Roy Cohn.

== Career ==
Over a four-decade career, Roiphe has proven so prolific that the critic Sally Eckhoff observed "tracing Anne Roiphe's career often feels like following somebody through a revolving door: the requirements of keeping the pace can be trying." (Eckhoff described the writer as "a free-thinking welter of contradictions, a never-say-die feminist who's nuts about children"). Roiphe published Digging Out, her first novel, in 1967. Her second, Up the Sandbox (1970), became a national best-seller.

Roiphe has published several novels and two memoirs as well as contributed essays and reviews to The New York Times, The New York Times Magazine, New York Magazine, and others. In 1993, The New York Times described her as "a writer who has never toed a party line, feminist or otherwise." Her 1996 memoir Fruitful: A Memoir of Modem Motherhood was nominated for the National Book Award.

From 1997 to 2002, she served as a columnist for The New York Observer. Her memoir Epilogue was published in 2008 and the memoir Art and Madness in 2011. Ballad of the Black and Blue Mind was published by Seven Stories Press in May 2015, and received starred reviews from Publishers Weekly and Booklist.

== Personal ==
Roiphe was married twice. In 1957, she married Jack Richardson; they had one daughter, Emily Carter, then divorced. In 1967, she married Dr. Herman Roiphe; they had two children together: Katie Roiphe and Rebecca Roiphe in addition to Herman's two daughters from a prior marriage, Margaret Roiphe and Jean Roiphe.

== Books ==
=== Fiction ===
- Digging Out (1967) OCLC 1379123
- Up the Sandbox (1970) ISBN 9780586037737, OCLC 877359915
- Long Division (1972) ISBN 9780586039793, OCLC 16295613
- Torch Song (1977) ISBN 9780451079015, OCLC 1007318829
- Lovingkindness (1987) ISBN 9780446673884, OCLC 37109268
- If You Knew Me (1993) OCLC 608019531
- The Pursuit of Happiness (1991) ISBN 9780446363341, OCLC 26947510
- Secrets of the City (2003) ISBN 9781400049455, OCLC 52341544
- An Imperfect Lens (2006) ISBN 9781400082117, OCLC 859079333
- Ballad of the Black and Blue Mind (2015) ISBN 9781609806088, OCLC 966092535

=== Non-fiction ===
- Generation Without Memory: A Jewish Journey Through Christian America (1981) ISBN 9780671690014, OCLC 19923021
- Your Child's Mind: The Complete Book of Infant and Child Mental Health Care (co-authored with Dr. Herman Roiphe) (1985) ISBN 9780312897840, OCLC 13761834
- A Season for Healing, Reflections on the Holocaust (1988)
- A Mother's Eye: Motherhood and Feminism (1997) ISBN 9781860494376, OCLC 60164265
- Married: A Fine Predicament (2002) ISBN 9780747568513, OCLC 56450293
- Water from the Well: Sarah, Rebekah, Rachel, and Leah (2006)

=== Memoirs ===
- Fruitful: A Memoir of Modern Motherhood (1996) ISBN 9780140266726, OCLC 37861151
- 1185 Park Avenue, A Memoir (2000) ISBN 9780684857329, OCLC 44437446
- For Rabbit, with Love and Squalor: An American Read (2000) ISBN 9781501170843, OCLC 963359604
- Epilogue: A Memoir (2008) ISBN 9780061254628, OCLC 191930141
- Art and Madness: A Memoir of Lust Without Reason (2011) ISBN 9780307473967, OCLC 745979651
