= Acquaintance rape =

Rape that is perpetrated by a person who is known to the victim

Acquaintance rape is rape that is perpetrated by a person who knows the victim. Examples of acquaintances include someone the victim is dating, a classmate, co-worker, employer, family member, spouse, counselor, therapist, religious official, or medical doctor. Acquaintance rape includes a subcategory of incidents labeled date rape that involves people who are in romantic or sexual relationships with each other. When a rape is perpetrated by a college student on another student, the term campus rape is sometimes used.

Most rapes are perpetrated by a person known to the victim, but acquaintance rape is less likely to be reported than stranger rape. Thus, crime statistics often underestimate the prevalence of acquaintance rape compared to national surveys. The legal consequences of acquaintance rape are generally the same as for stranger rape, except in jurisdictions where marital rape is legal.

== Origin of the term ==
Studies distinguishing between stranger rape and those by a person known to the victim go back to the 1950s, when a study examining American police rape files from 1958 and 1960 found about half were alleged to have been committed by men who knew their victims. The phrase acquaintance rape was first used in print in 1982 by feminist writer and activist Diana Russell. She used it as an umbrella term to cover all rapes involving people who know one another, in her write-up of a study of 930 women in San Francisco in which she found that 35% reported having experienced rape or attempted rape by an acquaintance, compared with 11% who reported being raped by strangers. In 1988 American feminist writer Robin Warshaw published I Never Called It Rape, the first major book on acquaintance rape.

== Prevalence ==
Most rape is committed by someone the victim knows. In the United States, the Rape, Abuse & Incest National Network (RAINN) has reported that 45 percent of sexual assaults are committed by an acquaintance and an additional 25 percent by a current or former intimate partner.

A 2004–05 study of 30 predominantly European countries by the United Nations Research Institute found about half of rape victims knew their rapists, over a third by name. 17% were a colleague or boss, 16% a close friend, 11% a former partner, and 7% a current partner. In a major 2009 European Commission study of rape cases across Europe, it was found that 67% of rapists were known to the victim, with most being a current or former partner. In Europe, the most common rape location is in the home of the victim or rapist.

In the U.S., acquaintance rape frequently takes the form of date rape or gang rape. A 1987 survey of 7,000 students at 25 schools found that one in four had been a victim of rape or attempted rape, and 84% of those knew their attacker. The same study found that 16% of male students who admitted rape, and 10% who admitted attempting it, said they had not been acting alone. In 1985 the Association of American Colleges published a report describing what were then called "trains", in which multiple male students rape a woman who is incapacitated by drugs or alcohol. In a survey of 24 documented cases of alleged college gang rapes reported in the 1980s, 13 were perpetrated by fraternity members, nine by groups of athletes, and two by men unaffiliated with a formal group. In a U.S. National Women's Study, 20% of rapists were described as friends, 16% as husbands, 14% as boyfriends, and 9% non-relatives such as handymen, coworkers and neighbours.

A 1992 study of reported rapes in inner-city and suburban Johannesburg, South Africa found 80% of rapes of adult women were perpetrated by strangers, often by men who abducted them at gunpoint on their way to work or broke into their houses. However, the majority of rapes of girls under 16 years of age were perpetrated by people known to them, usually family or friends, and sometimes gang members.

In India, anti-rape campaigns tend to focus on "custodial rape": that is, rape of a woman by a man in a custodial position with higher status than hers, such as a landlord, policeman, or employer.

A 2005 study by the World Health Institute found that in Ethiopia almost all sexual violence is perpetrated by the husband or boyfriend of the victim.

== Types ==
Acquaintance rape is a broad category that includes all rapes except those perpetrated by people previously unknown to the rape victim. Acquaintance rape by definition includes all date rape and marital and other intra-family rape, as well as rape perpetrated by people such as classmates, co-workers, friends, neighbours, and people in business, employment or caretaker relationships. Prison rape, gang rape, child rape and statutory rape are often also forms of acquaintance rape. War rape and corrective rape fall under the category of acquaintance rape if the parties have met before the rape took place.

Rape of domestic and migrant workers by their employers has been reported in many countries including Kuwait, the United Arab Emirates, Saudi Arabia, Malaysia, Singapore and Indonesia.

=== College samples ===
Although date rape is a sub-section of acquaintance rape, many studies conducted with college student samples include both acquaintances and dating partners in the same category. All of the following studies on rape victimization among college women cited in this sub-section include non-dating acquaintances (for example, family members, friends, or classmates) as well as dating partners (such as boyfriends) in their questions on the characteristics of the rape perpetrator. Some studies have estimated that 90% of rapes perpetrated against college-age women are acquaintance rapes (Crawford et al. 2008; Fisher et al. 2000). A 2007 study by the National Crime Victims Research & Treatment Center that surveyed a nationally representative sample of over 5,000 women, including 3,000 college women, found that, among the college women, over 50% of forcible rapes and about 70% of drug-facilitated or incapacitated rapes were perpetrated by an acquaintance (Kilpatrick et al. 2007).

=== Community samples ===
The National Crime Victims Research & Treatment Center compared rape rates of college students and community women. (Kilpatrick et al. 2007) The study found that, compared to college students, women in the general population had higher rates of lifetime rape (18% vs 12%) and lifetime forcible rape (15% vs 6%). The National Intimate Partner and Sexual Violence Survey conducted by the Centers for Disease Control (CDC) found that 41% of women with lifetime prevalence of rape had been assaulted by an acquaintance, and more than half (51%) were raped by a current or previous intimate partner (Black et al. 2011). Among rapes that were facilitated by alcohol or other drugs so that the victim was unable to fellate, virtually all cases (93%) were perpetrated by an acquaintance or an intimate partner. This survey also included male respondents. Although the overall lifetime prevalence of rape was lower for men than women (1 in 71, or 1.4%, men vs 1 in 5, or 18%, women), similarly half of rapes of men involved acquaintances (52%) and 15.1% by a stranger. Typically, perpetrators of male rape were other men.

== Motivations ==
Acquaintance rape is a broad category, and so the motivations of acquaintance rapists are varied. However, researchers say that acquaintance rapists generally share common characteristics: the ability to enjoy sex even with someone who is intoxicated, crying, pleading, resisting, vomiting and/or unconscious, and an exaggerated sense of entitlement and lack of guilt, remorse, empathy and compassion for others. Researchers say acquaintance rapists' primary motivation is sexual gratification, and that they tend to see their actions as seduction, not rape.

A study of 15 upper-middle-class American non-stranger rapists found many described their fathers as both physically and emotionally distant, and expressed hostility towards women and a desire to dominate them, and held hyper-masculine attitudes. One researcher theorized that men who have healthy relationships with their fathers may have less need to define themselves in opposition to women and be less inclined to "hypermasculine displays of male superiority."

Researchers say gang rape is motivated by a desire to show off, to be part of a group, or fear of being ostracized by other men or boys if they don't participate. Researchers say marital rape is not about sex and is instead about control, power, violence and humiliation.

== Effects ==
The large majority of rape victims do not sustain physical injury apart from the penetration itself. Contrary to what is often assumed, stranger rape is less likely to cause physical injury than acquaintance rape, particularly rape by a current or former intimate partner: 24% of women raped by a stranger sustain physical injury additional to the penetration, compared with 40–50% of women raped by a current or former partner.

== Reporting ==
The circumstances of the rape and relationship between the victim and the perpetrator do not change the legal definition of rape. Although acquaintance rape is well-represented among rapes that are reported to authorities, surveys show that they are much more likely than stranger rapes to go unreported. One American study found that less than 2% of victims of acquaintance rape had reported their rape to the police, compared with 21% of those raped by a stranger.

Cases involving acquaintances that are not reflected in crime statistics have been labeled hidden rape (Koss et al. 1988). For example, one national survey of college women showed that 29% of stranger rapes versus 3% of acquaintance rapes were reported to the police. The findings are similar among community women where 34% of stranger rapes and 13% of acquaintance rapes are reported (Kilpatrick et al. 2007). Among the reasons that acquaintance rapes may not be reported are that victims do not self-identify as rape victims. Not realizing or not choosing to view as rape an experience that involved force or alcohol/drug-facilitated penetration when unable to consent has been called unacknowledged rape. It is a well-accepted finding first reported in the late 1980s (Koss et al., 1988) repeated in the early 2000s (Fisher et al., 2003) and most recently replicated by Kilpatrick et al. 2007. Unacknowledged rape is more common in college students raped by acquaintances (23%) compared to strangers (55%). Among community women, those who acknowledge the incident as rape are more likely to report than those who do not (21% vs 6%). Women who had been drinking alcohol or using drugs at the time of the rape are less likely to report the experience to authorities (Kilpatrick et al. 2007; Fisher et al. 2003). Other reasons that rape victims who have been raped by a known perpetrator may be less likely to report are feelings of shame, self-blame for the rape, fear of not being believed, not wanting to stir up controversy in social or familial circles, and not wanting to get their acquaintance in trouble (Kilpatrick et al. 2007). These feelings are all encouraged by traditional misconceptions about rape that perpetuate the stereotype that acquaintance rapes are not “real” rapes (Estrich, 1987).
