= Journal of Interpersonal Violence =

- Discipline: Criminology, applied psychology
- Language: English
- Edited by: Jon R. Conte

Publication details
- History: 1986-present
- Publisher: SAGE Publications
- Frequency: Monthly
- Impact factor: 6.144 (2020)

Standard abbreviations
- ISO 4: J. Interpers. Violence

Indexing
- ISSN: 0886-2605 (print); 1552-6518 (web)
- LCCN: sf93092056
- OCLC no.: 12879051

Links
- Journal homepage; Online access; Online archive

The Journal of Interpersonal Violence (JIV) is a peer-reviewed, academic journal that publishes papers in the field of interpersonal violence, and focuses on the study of victims and perpetrators of interpersonal violence. The journal's editor-in-chief is Jon R. Conte (University of Washington). It was established in 1986 and is currently published by SAGE Publications.

== Abstracting and indexing ==
The Journal of Interpersonal Violence is abstracted and indexed in Scopus and the Social Sciences Citation Index. According to the Journal Citation Reports, its 2020 impact factor is 6.144.
