= Bitch (magazine) =

American feminist magazine

- Bitch, cover from the Winter 2004 issue
- Editor: Rosa Cartagena
- Categories: Lifestyle, feminism
- Frequency: Quarterly
- Circulation: 80,000 (2015)
- Founder: Andi Zeisler, Lisa Jervis, Benjamin Shaykin
- Founded: January 1996; 30 years ago
- Final issue: April 2022; 4 years ago
- Company: Bitch Media
- Country: United States
- Based in: Portland, Oregon, U.S.
- Language: English
- Website: www.bitchmedia.org
- ISSN: 2162-5352
- OCLC: 46789560

Bitch was an independent, quarterly alternative magazine published in Portland, Oregon. Its tagline described it as a "feminist response to pop culture", and it was described in 2008 by the Columbia Journalism Review as "a respected journal of cultural discourse". As a feminist publication, it took an intersectional approach.

Bitch was published by the nonprofit feminist media organization Bitch Media. The magazine included analysis of current political events, social, and cultural trends, television shows, movies, books, music, advertising, and artwork. Its print magazine had about 80,000 readers. The magazine's publisher, Kate Lesniak, estimated that it had an online readership of 4.5 million. On April 12, 2022, it was announced that Bitch Media would cease operations in June 2022.

== History ==
=== Founding ===
The first issue of Bitch was a ten-page feature, Bitch: Feminist Response to Pop Culture, which started as a zine distributed out of the back of a station wagon in 1996, published in January 1996 in Oakland, California. The founding editors, Lisa Jervis and Andi Zeisler, along with founding art director Benjamin Shaykin, wanted to create a public forum in which to air thoughts and theories on women, gender, and feminist issues, interpreted through the lens of the media and popular culture. In a 2008 interview, Zeisler stated that the zine published content of interest to the editors and which wasn't available elsewhere. Prior to founding the magazine, Jervis and Zeisler had worked as interns at Sassy, another feminist magazine.

Later speaking about the decision to name the magazine "Bitch", Zeisler stated that it was inspired by reclamation of the word 'queer' by the LGBT community. The editors viewed the word 'bitch' as associated with a derogatory description of outspoken women so thought it best to claim the word in advance." Other reasons for the name included its capability to intrigue people, and the word's use as both a verb and a noun. Zeisler stated that: "Having the word 'feminist' in the magazine subtitle has been far more controversial than having the word 'bitch' in the title... the word 'bitch', for better or worse, has become part of our cultural lexicon. Yet 'feminist' is still one of those words that people find very hard to understand."

=== Expansion ===
In 2001, a loan from San Francisco's Independent Press Association allowed Jervis and Zeisler to quit their current jobs and work on Bitch full-time and the magazine officially became a non-profit. Around that time, Shaykin left the magazine. By the early 2000s, the magazine had achieved a readership of about 35,000, which grew to 47,000 by 2006.

The magazine was the subject of an obscenity controversy when it published a dildo advertisement on its back cover for its Fall 2002 issue. Responses to this were mixed, and Bitch later published varying opinions about the incident from letters sent by readers. Later interviewed about the events, Zeisler expressed that there had been a certain naivety about the impact of placing the advert on the back cover. The U.S. Postal Service contacted the magazine and stated that copies of the issue would be considered obscene literature and would have to be distributed in black polybags.

Bitch celebrated its 10th anniversary in August 2006 by publishing a Bitch anthology entitled BITCHfest: Ten Years of Cultural Criticism from the Pages of Bitch Magazine. Edited by Bitch founders Jervis and Zeisler, BITCHfest includes essays, rants and raves, and reviews reprinted from previous issues of Bitch magazine, along with new pieces written especially for the anthology.

In March 2007, Bitch relocated from its offices in Oakland, California, to Portland, Oregon. In 2009, the Bitch nonprofit changed its name to Bitch Media, covering expansion beyond publication of the magazine. The magazine's 50th issue was published in 2011. That same year, Bitch won an Utne Reader Independent Press Award for Best Social/Cultural Coverage.

In 2011, Bitch partnered with feminist media critic Anita Sarkeesian to create the video series Tropes vs. Women. The series examined common tropes in the depiction of women in media with a particular focus on science fiction. As of 2012, Bitch hosted the Bitch YA Book Club for young women and girls, which focused on young adult literature. The reading group's online blog included a forum for club participants.

Bitch Media also hosted podcasts, and a college speaker series, "Bitch on Campus". "Popaganda" was hosted by Amy Lam and Sarah Mirk, who discussed politics, news, and media. "Backtalk" was hosted by Amy Lam and Dahlia Balcazar, who reviewed and discussed the week in popular culture through a feminist lens.

=== Decline and closure ===
Bitch Media experienced difficulty funding its magazine in its final years. On April 12, 2022, Bitch Media announced they would be shutting down the publication after 26 years. The magazine's last issue was released in June 2022, for its Summer edition. Bitch Media ceased all operations the same month. According to Bitch Media, its website would keep archives of its publications available for the "foreseeable future". By 2025 the website went offline.
