= The Morning After (book) =

1993 book by Katie Roiphe

- Author: Katie Roiphe
- Language: English
- Subject: Date rape
- Publisher: Little, Brown and Company
- Publication date: 1993
- Publication place: United States
- Media type: Print (hardcover and paperback)
- Pages: 180
- ISBN: 0-316-75432-3
- OCLC: 27768540

The Morning After: Sex, Fear and Feminism on Campus, is a nonfiction book authored by Katie Roiphe. First released in 1993, the book discussed date rape and American feminism. Prior to its release, a portion of the book was published as an essay, "The Rape Crisis, or Is Dating Dangerous?" in the New York Times Magazine. In 1994, the book was reprinted with a new introduction along with a shortened title.

== Background ==
Roiphe’s book recounts various experiences during her undergraduate matriculation at Harvard. She describes attending safe sex group meetings, a lecture by Catharine MacKinnon, and watching 'Take Back the Night' marches.

In the book's introduction, Roiphe recognizes she is "writing against the grain" and states her book is "devoted to the idea of women taking responsibility for their actions".

== Publication ==
The book was first published on September 1, 1993, as a paperback. The book was re-published on September 7, 1994. The reprint contains a new introduction along with a shortened title.

== Summary ==
The book contains 7 chapters, along with acknowledgements, an introduction, afterword, and notes. It is written from the author’s point of view and describes her experiences while at Harvard University.

According to Roiphe, "rape crisis feminism" has taken feminism backwards and instilled fear into students and parents. She stated that the fear of being raped, along with the fear of contracting a disease (specifically HIV/AIDS), has stifled young adults, though she says that college should be a time of sexual exploration.

Roiphe expresses that feminism during her time at Harvard was preoccupied with women as victims of sexual harassment and rape. She questions statistics that "one in four college women is the victim of rape or attempted rape." Roiphe notes multiple universities supported this statistic and referenced multiple pamphlets distributed to students. She suggests this way of thinking will cause women to fear all men, including friends and professors.

One chapter is dedicated to "Take Back the Night" anti-rape marches. The chapter opens with an April march at Harvard University, where participants are sharing their personal accounts of rape. Roiphe notes that, over the years, the numbers of march participants have increased to thousands, and that half of those present during that march were males.

Another chapter is on feminist legal scholar Catharine MacKinnon, whom Roiphe nicknames the "Antiporn star." She recalls MacKinnon lecturing at Princeton, and criticizes MacKinnon's response to a question.

== Reception ==
Susan Brison wrote that the book promotes victim-blaming.

Christina Hoff Sommers referenced the book in "Who Stole Feminism?" (1994).

Naomi Klein wrote in the Globe & Mail that "[Roiphe] employ[s] intellectual dishonesty, rhetorical distortion and cheap tricks" within her book.

Christopher Lehmann-Haupt, writing for the New York Times, called The Morning After a "book of the times" and said, "it is courageous of Ms. Roiphe to speak out against the herd ideas that campus life typically encourages."

The Morning After received positive response from the critic Camile Paglia, who called it "an eloquent, thoughtful, finely argued book that was savaged from coast to coast by shallow, dishonest feminist book reviewers."

In 1993, a negative review by Katha Pollitt titled "Not Just Bad Sex" was published in The New Yorker.

Additionally Cathy Young described the book in the Washington Post as "clearheaded, wry, disturbing look at the radical feminist obsession with sexual victimization."

== See also ==
- Sexual Violence: Opposing Viewpoints
