= Trauma, Violence, & Abuse =

- Discipline: Trauma, criminology, social work
- Language: English
- Edited by: Jon R. Conte

Publication details
- History: 2000-present
- Publisher: SAGE Publications
- Frequency: Quarterly
- Impact factor: 6.325 (2019)

Standard abbreviations
- ISO 4: Trauma Violence Abuse

Indexing
- ISSN: 1524-8380 (print); 1552-8324 (web)
- LCCN: 99008561
- OCLC no.: 39928233

Links
- Journal homepage; Online access; Online archive

Trauma, Violence, & Abuse is a peer-reviewed academic journal that covers research on trauma, abuse, and violence. The journal's editor-in-chief is Jon R. Conte (University of Washington). It was established in 2000 and is currently published by SAGE Publications.

== Abstracting and indexing ==
Trauma, Violence, & Abuse is abstracted and indexed in MEDLINE/PubMed, Scopus, and the Social Sciences Citation Index. According to the Journal Citation Reports, its 2019 impact factor is 6.325, ranking it 1st out of 44 journals in the category "Social Work", 1st out of 47 journals in the category "Family Studies", and 2nd out of 69 journals in the category "Criminology & Penology".

== See also ==
- Psychological trauma
- Trauma (medicine)
