= Lisa Jervis =

American writer (born 1972)

- Born: 1972 (age 53–54); Boston, Massachusetts, U.S.
- Education: Oberlin College (BA); University of California, Berkeley (MS)
- Occupations: Writer, editor, publisher
- Relatives: Robert Jervis (father)

Lisa Jervis (born 1972) is an American writer, editor, publisher, and information technology professional. She is one of the founding editors and publisher of Bitch Magazine, established in 1996.

== Early life and education ==
Born in Boston in 1972, she is the daughter of international relations scholar Robert Jervis and educational consultant and researcher Kathe Jervis (née Weil). She was raised in Boston, Los Angeles, and New York City. She earned a Bachelor of Arts degree in English and creative writing from Oberlin College in 1994. She earned a master's degree in information management and systems from the School of Information at the University of California at Berkeley in 2014.

== Career ==
Jervis began her career as an intern at Sassy magazine.

In addition to her role with Bitch magazine, Jervis was editor-at-large of LiP magazine during 2004–07. She is founding board chair of Women in Media and News, as well as a member of the advisory board of outLoud Radio.

Jervis and the other founding editor, Andi Zeisler, published the collection Bitchfest: Ten Years of Cultural Criticism from the Pages of Bitch Magazine in 2006, to many positive reviews. Kirkus Reviews summarized that "Jervis and Zeisler founded the ’zine to eschew the complacent postfeminist viewpoint." During this time the two were profiled by Kate Bolick of The Boston Globe in 2006.

Jervis has published extensively on gender-themed subjects and the evolution of her writing in that area has been noted by scholars such as Shira Tarrant. In 2008 her essay “An Old Enemy in a New Outfit: How Date Rape Became Gray Rape and Why it Matters” appeared in the edited collection volume Yes Means Yes!: Visions of Female Sexual Power and A World Without Rape.

In 2009 Jervis published the book Cook Food: A Manualfesto for Easy, Healthy, Local Eating with PM Press. A review in The New Yorker called it a "fantastic how-to guide."

After earning her master's degree in 2014, Jervis became an information technology consultant for social justice-oriented non-profit entities. She was the operations director for the Center for Media Justice.

== Personal life ==
She now lives in Oakland, California.

== See also ==
- Bitch (magazine)
