= Katie Roiphe =

American author (born 1968)

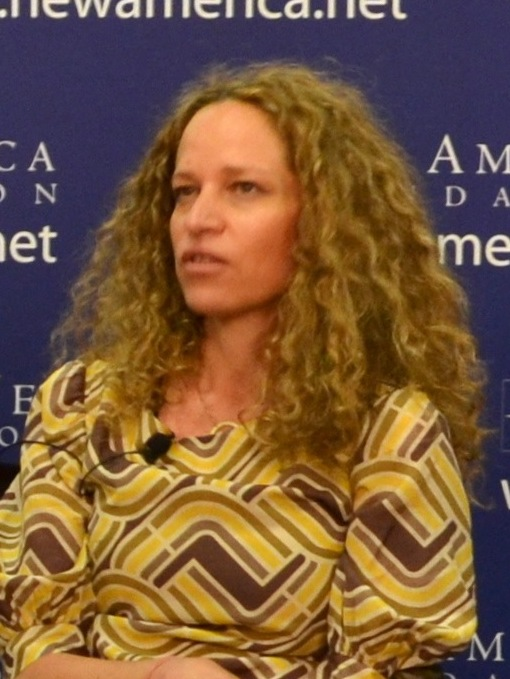
- Roiphe in 2013
- Born: Katherine Roiphe; July 13, 1968 (age 58); New York City, New York, U.S.
- Occupations: Non-fiction writer, critic, professor
- Parent(s): Anne Roiphe; Herman Roiphe
- Writing career
- Period: 1993–present
- Notable works: The Morning After: Sex, Fear, and Feminism on Campus (1993), Uncommon Arrangements: Seven Portraits of Married Life in London Literary Circles 1910-1939 (2007)

Katie Roiphe (born July 13, 1968) is an American author and journalist. She is best known as the author of the non-fiction book The Morning After: Sex, Fear, and Feminism on Campus (1993). She is also the author of Last Night in Paradise: Sex and Morals at the Century's End (1997), and the 2007 study of writers and marriage, Uncommon Arrangements. Her 2001 novel Still She Haunts Me is an imagining of the relationship between Charles Dodgson (known as Lewis Carroll) and Alice Liddell, the real-life model for Dodgson's Alice's Adventures in Wonderland. She is also known for allegedly planning to name the creator of the Shitty Media Men list in an article for Harper's Magazine.

== Background and education ==
Roiphe grew up in New York City, daughter of psychoanalyst Herman Roiphe and feminist writer Anne (née Roth) Roiphe. She attended the all-female Brearley School, received her BA from Harvard University and Radcliffe College in 1990, and received a PhD in English Literature from Princeton University in 1995.

In 2001, Roiphe married attorney Harry Chernoff in a Jewish ceremony in Amagansett, New York. They had one daughter, Violet; they separated in 2005 (the year Roiphe's father died), and later divorced.

She subsequently had a son, and has defended being a single mother.

== The Morning After ==
In her first book, The Morning After, Roiphe argues that in many instances of supposed campus date rape, women are responsible for their actions. "One of the questions used to define rape was: 'Have you had sexual intercourse when you didn't want to because a man gave you alcohol or drugs?' The phrasing raises the issue of agency. Why aren't college women responsible for their own intake of alcohol or drugs? A man may give her drugs, but she herself decides to take them. If we assume that women are not all helpless and naive, then they should be responsible for their choice to drink or take drugs. If a woman's 'judgment is impaired' and she has sex, it isn't always the man's fault; it isn't necessarily always rape."

In the review for The New York Times, Christopher Lehmann-Haupt praised the book, calling it a "Book of the Times" and stating, "It is courageous of Ms. Roiphe to speak out against the herd ideas that campus life typically encourages." Writing for The New Yorker, Katha Pollitt gave the book a negative review, calling it "a careless and irresponsible performance, poorly argued and full of misrepresentations, slapdash research, and gossip." Pollitt's review was in turn criticized by Christina Hoff Sommers in Who Stole Feminism? (1994). The Morning After received a positive response from Camille Paglia, who called it "an eloquent, thoughtful, finely argued book that was savaged from coast to coast by shallow, dishonest feminist book reviewers".

== Cultural criticism ==
Roiphe's second book was 1997's Last Night in Paradise: Sex and Morals at the Century's End. She also began to contribute reviews and essays to Vogue, Harper's, Slate, The Washington Post, and The New York Times. In 2008, she published an essay featured in the anthology Thirty Ways of Looking at Hillary: Reflections by Women Writers. In her essay, entitled "Elect Sister Frigidaire", Roiphe writes that Hillary Clinton is "in many ways the feminist dream incarnate, the opportunity made flesh, the words we whisper to little girls: 'You can be president. You can do anything you want.'" Reviewing the book for The New York Times, Michiko Kakutani noted that some of Roiphe's observations were in "stark contrast" to what Kakutani considered some of the "antifeminist" pieces in the collection. She has also written a novel based on the life of Lewis Carroll and his relationship with the real Alice, called Still She Haunts Me, which was published in 2001.

In 2007, Roiphe published Uncommon Arrangements: Seven Portraits of Married Life in London Literary Circles 1910-1939. Donna Seaman, in the trade publication Booklist, gave the book a starred review, writing, "Roiphe, inspired aesthetically and philosophically by the writings and lives of these social and artistic pioneers, offers sophisticated psychological, sexual, and social analysis, fashioning uncommonly affecting portraits of uncommon men and women." In The New York Times, the editor and critic Tina Brown called it "the perfect bedside book for an age like our own, when everything is known and nothing is understood." In The New York Observer, Alexandra Jacobs conceded "Katie haters will be sorry to hear that it’s very absorbing. The author has done something constructive, for a change, with her contempt for the contemporary age’s lily-livered female psyche..." Roiphe responded to some of her critics in an essay in Slate including Gawker.

In 2012, Roiphe published the essay collection In Praise of Messy Lives. In The New York Times, critic Dwight Garner praised the book, writing, "I’ve begun recommending it to people, particularly to would-be writers, explaining that Ms. Roiphe’s are how you want your essays to sound: lean and literate, not unlike Orwell’s, with a frightening ratio of velocity to torque.... Among Ms. Roiphe’s gifts is one for brevity. She lingers long enough to make her points, and no longer. If I could condense my opinion of her new book onto a T-shirt, that Beefy-T would read: 'Team Roiphe.'"

== Controversy ==
In January 2018, Twitter users spread the information that Roiphe planned to name the creator of the anonymous Shitty Media Men list, a private spreadsheet that later became public. The creator, Moira Donegan, outed herself preemptively in an essay for The Cut magazine.

== Academic work ==
Roiphe is a professor at New York University's Arthur L. Carter Journalism Institute and the Director of the Cultural Reporting and Criticism Program.

== Books ==
- The Morning After: Sex, Fear and Feminism on Campus (1993) ISBN 9780140242898, OCLC 221728097
- Last Night in Paradise: Sex and Morals at the Century's End (1997) ISBN 9780316754392, OCLC 636777343
- Still She Haunts Me (2001) ISBN 9780385335300, OCLC 906910447
- Uncommon Arrangements: Seven Portraits of Married Life in London Literary Circles 1910-1939 (2007) ISBN 9780385339377, OCLC 1015482076
- In Praise of Messy Lives (2012) ISBN 9781782112082, OCLC 862658759
- The Violet Hour: Great Writers at the End (2016) ISBN 9780349008530, OCLC 980104120
- The Power Notebooks (2020) ISBN 9781982128012, OCLC 1114283490
