= Vera Baird =

British barrister and politician (born 1950)

Dame Vera Baird DBE KC
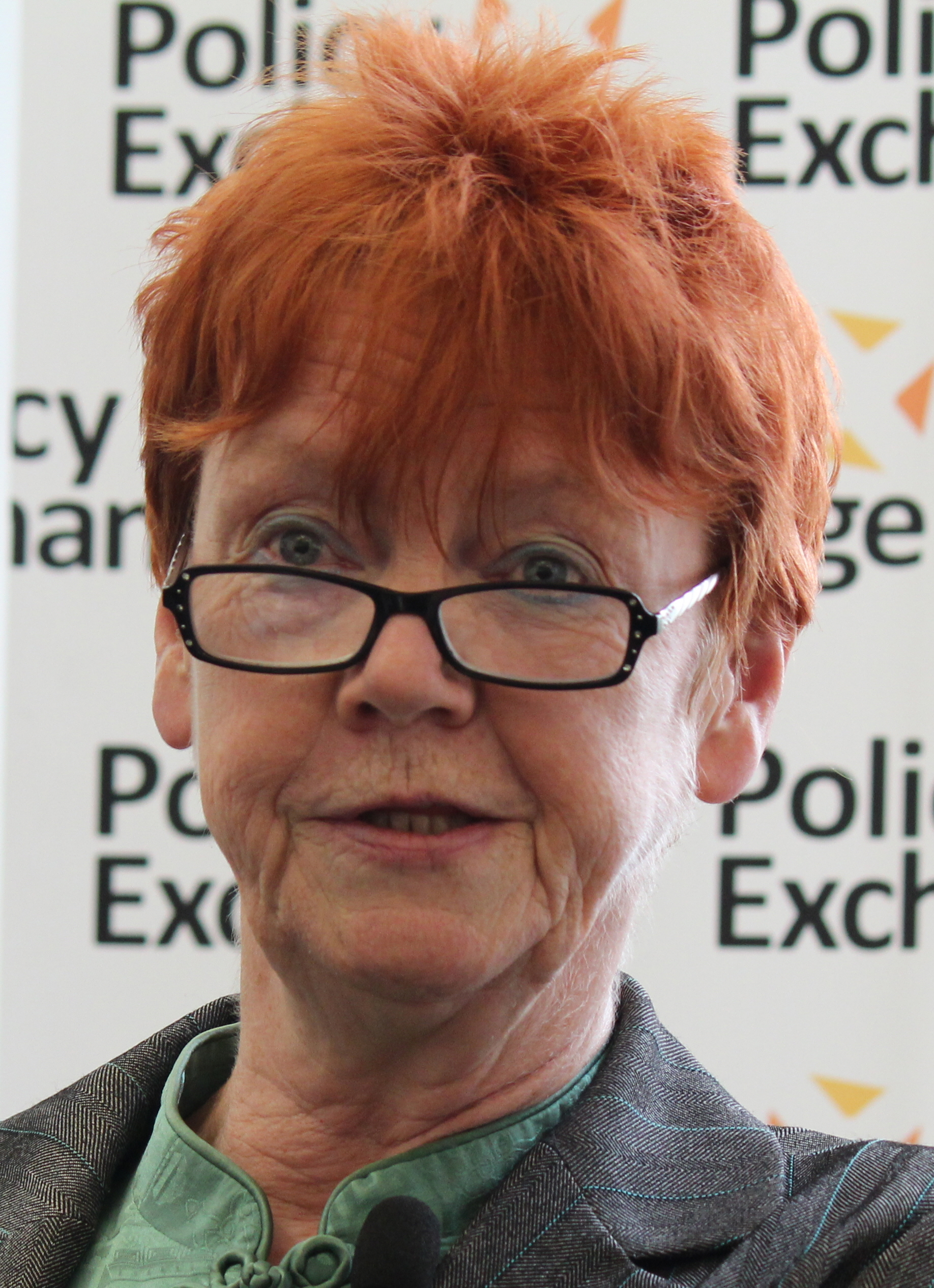
- Baird in 2013

Chair of the Criminal Cases Review Commission
- Incumbent
- Assumed office 2 June 2025
- Preceded by: Helen Pitcher

Victims' Commissioner for England and Wales
- In office 15 June 2019 – 30 September 2022
- Appointed by: David Gauke
- Preceded by: The Baroness Newlove
- Succeeded by: The Baroness Newlove (acting)

Northumbria Police and Crime Commissioner
- In office 22 November 2012 – 7 June 2019
- Preceded by: Office created
- Succeeded by: Kim McGuinness

Solicitor General for England and Wales
- In office 29 June 2007 – 11 May 2010
- Prime Minister: Gordon Brown
- Preceded by: Mike O'Brien
- Succeeded by: Edward Garnier

Parliamentary Under-Secretary of State for Constitutional Affairs
- In office 5 May 2006 – 9 May 2007
- Prime Minister: Tony Blair
- Preceded by: David Lammy; Chris Leslie

Member of Parliament for Redcar
- In office 7 June 2001 – 12 April 2010
- Preceded by: Mo Mowlam
- Succeeded by: Ian Swales

Personal details
- Born: Vera Thomas; 13 February 1950 (age 76) Oldham, Lancashire, England
- Party: Labour
- Spouses: David Taylor-Gooby (m. 1972; div. 1978) Robert Baird (m. 1978; died 1979)
- Education: Newcastle Polytechnic; Open University, London Guildhall University; University of Teesside

Dame Vera Baird DBE KC (née Thomas; born 13 February 1950) is a British barrister and politician who has held roles as a government minister, police and crime commissioner, and Victims' Commissioner for England and Wales. Since June 2025 Baird has served as Chair of the Criminal Cases Review Commission.

A Labour Party Member of Parliament for Redcar from 2001 to 2010, Baird was a government minister from 2006 to 2010 and the Solicitor General for England and Wales from 2007 to 2010. She served as the Police and Crime Commissioner for Northumbria Police from November 2012 to June 2019. She was appointed as Victims' Commissioner in June 2019 and resigned in September 2022, accusing government ministers of downgrading victims' interests.

Baird was appointed Dame Commander of the Order of the British Empire (DBE) in the 2017 New Year Honours for services to women and equality.

== Early life and education ==
Baird was born in Oldham, Lancashire, and attended Yew Tree County Primary School and the local authority-run Chadderton Grammar School for Girls. She gained an LLB degree from Newcastle Polytechnic. While at Newcastle Polytechnic she founded and edited a student newspaper, Polygon. The next year, she was elected vice president of the Polytechnic Union. In 1983, she gained a BA degree in literature and modern history at the Open University.

Also in 1983, she became a legal associate of the Royal Town Planning Institute. She completed the first year of an MA degree in modern history at London Guildhall University from 1999 before transferring to the University of Teesside on being selected for Redcar. She is currently studying for an MPhil degree in History at the University of Teesside.

She is an honorary fellow of St Hilda's College, Oxford, and of Teesside University, and an honorary professor of London South Bank University. In November 2017 Baird was appointed an Honorary Fellow of Durham University Law School.

== Legal career ==
Baird was called to the Bar at Gray's Inn in 1975 and first practised in the North East, setting up Collingwood Chambers in Newcastle upon Tyne, with other young barristers, shortly after she finished her pupilage and becoming its Head of Chambers for some years.

In 1983, she was retained to act for Billingham Against Nuclear Dumping (BAND) when the then nuclear waste disposal agency NIREX planned to store intermediate-level nuclear waste in a disused anhydrite mine under Billingham, though the plans were abandoned in 1985 when the owners of the mine, ICI, refused to co-operate. At the conclusion of the campaign her fees were, at her direction, donated by BAND to the Druridge Bay Campaign. She subsequently represented similar groups opposed to nuclear-waste dumping threatened at Fulbeck in Lincolnshire (Lincolnshire Against Nuclear Dumping- LAND), at North Killingholme on Humberside (HAND) and at Bradwell (BAND) in a lengthy High Court action in 1986 before the plans were abandoned by the Conservative government shortly before the 1987 general election.

Baird represented a dismissed mother-to-be in an early pregnancy discrimination case (Brown v Stockton on Tees Borough Council) in the House of Lords. In the late 1980s she represented a mother who was alleged to have killed her three sons, an early example of a parent allegedly suffering from Münchausen syndrome by proxy. She acted for many political protesters, at Greenham Common and other peace camps and on anti-Apartheid marches and demonstrations, and defended women who damaged shops in protest against 'top-shelf' magazines. She represented local objectors in compulsory purchase and planning inquiries.

During the 1984–85 miners' strike, she represented striking miners, most notably in North East England, charged with offences arising from picketing, demonstrations and the alleged intimidation of miners seeking to break the strike. On Saturdays during the strike, Baird was regularly seen outside a supermarket in Jesmond with a wheelbarrow collecting food for miners' families.

Baird met the 6th Lord Gifford while working on the Orgreave trial where her questioning of the police proved crucial to the outcome. The Orgreave trial concerned allegations of riot and violent disorder against 95 miners, 15 of whom were in the first trial, which was abandoned by the prosecution after 16 weeks. She joined Gifford's chambers before moving to the Chambers of Michael Mansfield QC in 1988.

As a member of Mansfield's Chambers, Baird was involved in many high-profile cases at the bar. She defended in murder cases, robberies, drug cases, fraud and bribery cases at the Old Bailey and on appeal to the Court of Appeal and House of Lords. She also prosecuted in environmental cases for Greenpeace.

In 1994, she represented the defendant in R v Carol Peters (the appeal and retrial), in which the Court of Appeal quashed Peters' murder conviction (alleged temazepam poisoning and the inflicting of 39 stab wounds on her husband) and ordered a retrial. At the retrial Peters was acquitted of murder, the defence being that she was suffering from battered woman syndrome, at the time an undeveloped area of law and fact. She also represented Emma Humphreys on appeal, a disadvantaged young woman convicted of murdering her violent pimp when she was 17 years old. The case drew attention to battered women who kill their violent partners and underpinned legislative changes subsequently made by the Labour Government when Baird was a minister. Baird acted for many other abused women following the Humphreys case and the legal changes that it brought about.

Other high-profile cases Baird has been involved in include the representation of murderer Jane Andrews in an appeal. She defended prisoners accused of rioting at Risley Remand Centre and at Strangeways Prison and continued to represent campaigners in many kinds of protest case.

In 2000, Baird took silk, 25 years after becoming a barrister.

== Parliamentary career ==
At the 1983 general election, Baird contested the constituency of Berwick-upon-Tweed, finishing in third place behind the victor Alan Beith. Despite the party's landslide defeat nationally, she received an increase in the Labour vote. At the 2001 general election she was selected to contest Labour's then ultra-safe seat of Redcar, following the retirement of the sitting MP and former Cabinet minister, Mo Mowlam. Baird won with 7% smaller vote than Mowlam, taking the seat with a large majority.

Baird served on a number of select committees between 2001 and 2005 including Joint Select Committee on Human Rights from 2001 to 2003 and the Select Committee on Work and Pensions between 2003 and 2005.

Baird was re-elected at the 2005 general election with a reduction in her majority. She then became the parliamentary private secretary to the Home Secretary, Charles Clarke.

On 8 May 2006, she was appointed as a parliamentary under-secretary of state for the Department for Constitutional Affairs – which was renamed the Ministry of Justice in May 2007, following the reorganisation of the Home Office. In June 2007, newly appointed Prime Minister Gordon Brown appointed Baird Solicitor General for England and Wales.

In 2006, Baird commented that in calculating the sentence of a sex offender the judge had been too lenient; she retracted the comments after her boss Lord Falconer of Thoroton supported the judge, saying the fault lay not with the judiciary but with sentencing guidelines. Judge Keith Cutler later suggested that criticism from ministers including Baird and Home Secretary John Reid could force judges to break their tradition of silence when criticised.

In 2009, Baird helped establish the Stern Review on the way rape cases are handled; an independent report by Baroness Stern, it was published in March 2010 concluding that there needed to be a greater focus on victims.

In the recession beginning in mid-2008, the worldwide price of steel halved over a period of six months, steel production worldwide reduced and in the UK the blast furnace at Teesside Steelworks Corus was eventually shut down on 19 February 2010. The whole plant was then mothballed following the withdrawal of an international consortium that had been considering the purchase of the plant. There were more than a thousand redundancies and the future of Redcar, as a steel town was undermined. A major regional campaign to save the steelworks was operating but, despite receiving praise for her own personal efforts in the campaign which had included a trip to Italy in an attempt to persuade Marcegaglia, the leading consortium business to keep to the contract, the view was that the Labour Government had failed to save the steelworks. Baird lost her seat in the House of Commons on 7 May 2010 at the 2010 general election, with a 21.8% swing, the largest against Labour in the general election and the first time in the short history of the constituency the Labour Party had ever lost the seat in Redcar.

=== Backbencher ===
Baird was a frequent backbench speaker, winning adjournment debates on diverse national and local issues and in 2004 she was awarded The Spectator Backbencher of the Year Award. During her time as an MP, Baird was a member of both the Commonwealth Parliamentary Association and the Inter-Parliamentary Union. She delivered lectures at conferences on democracy, gender and human rights in many locations around the world and carried out election monitoring duties on nine occasions.

She was a notable figure in several parliamentary campaigns including that to remove the rule where pensioners going into hospital had to surrender their pension and reapply on discharge and in another campaign that sought, successfully, to amend National Insurance and other rules – the amendments meaning that the number of women who qualified for the Basic State Pension was greatly increased.

Higher profile campaigns included her involvement in a Commons revolt against derogation from Article 5 of the European Convention on Human Rights in which Baird often took the lead in Parliament and the blocking of the partial abolition of jury trial proposed in the Criminal Justice Act 2003 through the proposal of amendments in the Commons. Bob Marshall-Andrews, another MP opposed to the abolition of jury trials, gave credit to Baird's efforts by stating "Saving jury trial was a singular victory and the one of which, in thirteen years at Westminster, I remain most proud. Without Vera's voice we would probably have lost and that remains, as they say, big medicine."

During her time as a backbencher, Baird was involved in various activities and work outside of Parliament. She designed and delivered courses, in consecutive years, for the British Council on aspects of criminal, civil and family law firstly for Ethiopian judiciary and secondly to the Ethiopian Police Service. She was a Fellow of the Norfolk Trust in Summer 2004, visiting New Zealand, South America and East Africa to study her own topic of violence against women and, as is the obligation to the Trust, to study the chosen topics of her 3 Co-Fellows, which were HIV/AIDs, environmental issues in connection with mineral extraction and Health Service delivery.

Baird was a patron of the Jubilee Debt Campaign of EVA-Women's Aid of FOCAS (autistic charity) and ROC (disabled charity). She was chair of the Fawcett Commission on Women and Criminal Justice from 2002 to 2006. This latter was a seminal review of women as defendant, as victims & witnesses and as workers in the criminal justice system which triggered a number of major legislative and non-legislative changes including the Corston Review on Women with Vulnerabilities in Prison. Baroness Corston succeeded Baird as commission chair when Baird became a minister. Baird worked with MIND on strategies to make the criminal courts more responsive to people with mental illness or learning difficulties and was secretary of the Parliamentary Labour Party Women's Committee.

During her time as MP and before she became a PPS, Baird was active in the Parliamentary Committee system. She was a member of the Commons Work and Pensions Select Committee from 2003 to 2005: scrutinising the work of the DWP. Influential Reports included on Women and Pensions and Child Support Agency, the latter bringing the demise this failed organisation; a member of the Joint Select Committee on Human Rights from 2001 to 2003: joint Lords-Commons Committee scrutinising legislation for compliance with European Convention on Human Rights. Influential reports include recommending the establishment of the Equality and Human Rights Commission; a member of the Pre-Legislative Scrutiny Committee on various constitution and democracy proposals including the Corruption Bill 2003 (With others on the committee, Baird was instrumental in ensuring the rejection of the Corruption Bill, which would not have complied with international obligations); a member of the Pre-Legislative Scrutiny Committee of the Armed Forces Bill from 2005 to 2006:

The committee approved the bill with modifications, in particular about reform to the Court Martial system; elected onto a large number of House of Commons Standing Committees (now (2012) known as General Committees, they conduct detailed scrutiny of proposed legislation) including: Export Control Bill 2002, Proceeds of Crime Bill 2002, Criminal Justice Bill 2003, Domestic Violence, Crime and Victims Bill 2004, Sexual Offences Bill 2003, Serious Organised Crime and Police Bill 2005, Pensions Bill 2004, Housing Bill 2004; the chair of All Party Parliamentary Groups on: Burma (jointly with John Bercow MP), On Equalities, for Citizens Advice, on Steel Industry, on Domestic and Sexual Violence; a member of All Party Parliamentary Groups on Ethiopia, Botswana, Tanzania, Great Lakes Region, India, the Falklands, Seaside Towns, Town Centre Management, Cancer Research, Cardiac Arrest in the Young and Animal Welfare.

=== Solicitor General for England and Wales: 2007–2010 ===
In June 2007, Baird became the Solicitor General for England and Wales, one of the senior law officers in the House of Commons and one of the government's chief legal advisers and criminal justice ministers, a position she held jointly with the attorney general, Baroness Scotland of Asthal.

As a senior law officer, Baird was responsible, alongside the attorney general, for the Law Office budget and for setting the strategic direction for the Crown Prosecution Service, Serious Fraud Office, Service Prosecuting Authority (covering the Armed Forces) Treasury Solicitor's Department, Government Legal Service and Her Majesty's Crown Prosecution Service Inspectorate as well as giving lead ministerial sponsorship to the National Fraud Authority. At this time, the law officers also oversaw the Director of Public Prosecutions for Northern Ireland. A further aspect of the role of solicitor general for England and Wales is the requirement for close liaison with various police bodies including the strategic level Association of Chief Police Officers (APCO).

As a senior law officer, Baird held the responsibility, alongside the attorney general, for protecting the independence of prosecutors; for providing legal advice to more than 20 Whitehall departments and for taking action on contempt of court (typically when press reporting of criminal cases may inappropriately influence their outcome). She represented the Government in court, in particular in the Court of Appeal Criminal Division on Unduly Lenient Sentence appeals, asking the Appeal Court to increase too lenient Crown Court sentences. She advised on charities law where there were disputes in which the State had an interest. The law officers advise on whether Bills are compatible with the Human Rights Act 1998.

As solicitor general, Baird – together with the attorney general – developed a pro bono committee to focus and streamline the availability of free legal advice. They set up the Access to Justice Foundation, to hold costs from pro bono cases and changed the law to allow lawyers who have acted on a for free basis to apply for costs to be put into the fund to support the organisation for future free legal work.

Baird and Scotland oversaw the introduction of Associate Prosecutors, extending the powers of less qualified prosecutors to present cases in the magistrates' courts, to save fully qualified solicitors from the need to conduct small case, so freeing them to prepare serious work for the Crown Court. They also developed and oversaw the introduction of CPS Online, a phone line for police charging advice.

With the attorney general, Baird, as sponsor minister, deployed a budget of £28 million to implement the recommendations of the 2006 Fraud Review and established the National Fraud Authority (NFA), which became an executive agency of the Law Officers Departments (LODs) in 2008 with Dr Bernard Herdan as its chief executive.

Baird was a senior member of the Inter-Ministerial Group which oversaw the NFA and the co-ordination of the UK's first National Fraud Strategy in partnership with more than 28 public private and trade bodies. In April 2008, the City of London Police was established as the Lead Force on fraud, to take over complex investigations and strengthen skills and expertise in the police nationwide. In its first year took on 71 major cases involving losses to victims estimated at £1 billion. The National Fraud Intelligence Bureau was established and Baird spoke at key events, such as the Fraud Advisory Panel's Conference to promote co-ordinated action against fraud and in particular present a new focus on prevention and protection of what had historically and wrongly been seen as a victimless crime.

In June 2007, the Law Officers approved the enhanced Digital Forensic Unit, a £1 million facility expanding the ability of the Serious Fraud Office (SFO) to retrieve information from computers and other devices seized in investigations.

In April 2008, Richard Alderman was appointed to transform the Serious Fraud Office following the highly critical De Grazia Report.

Baird and Scotland launched the Prosecutors' Convention to streamline the operations of more than 40 prosecuting bodies such as the Civil Aviation Authority, Maritime and Coastguard Agency, Financial Services Authority and the Office of Fair Trading.

Baird launched the Homophobic Hate Crime strategy and a Race and Religious Hate Crime strategy, with Sir Ken Macdonald and in 2008 with the CPS launched the first public policy on cases of crime against older people.

The CPS launched its first ever violence against women strategy in 2007, the first in Government and this resulted in policies on the prosecution or rape and domestic violence being updated and publicly launched.

Baird attended the Victims' Advisory Panel where victims informed of Government policy. She visited several joint CPS and Police Witness Care Units to develop the information and support for witnesses. She supported the roll-out of the Witness Intermediaries' Scheme, which provides support for witnesses with communication difficulties and the introduction of new offences to support those at risk of intimidation. Sara Payne was appointed as the first independent Victims' Champion with a role to listen to the views and concerns of victims and witnesses, and to challenge criminal justice agencies to improve their practices.

Baird was a member of the National Criminal Justice Board which co-ordinates the agencies which collectively make up the Criminal Justice system. Here she worked with the Commissioner of the Metropolitan Police, the chair of the Association of Police Authorities, the Judiciary, Probation and other agencies.

Baird was Ministerial sponsor of the Cleveland Local Criminal Justice Board and of the West Yorkshire LCJB.

=== Parliamentary expenses scandal ===
Baird was the subject of claims in newspapers at the time of the expenses scandal but, along with those of other MPs, her claims were investigated by Sir Paul Kennedy who found that she had claimed only for payments she was entitled to receive.

== Police and Crime Commissioner ==
=== First term ===
Baird was elected to the post of Northumbria Police and Crime Commissioner on 15 November 2012.

Despite it being Labour Party policy throughout the first years of Baird's tenure to do away with PCCs, Baird, a Labour Party member and former Labour Solicitor General, continued to promote the role. In 2016, the Labour Party changed its policy towards PCCs, the party leader describing the role as being "vital in a changing world".

Baird placed responses to domestic and sexual violence at the core of her PCC role and sought to integrate police work into a multi-agency strategic hub (MASH) where the focus is on the care for the victim.

In response to a 2014 report from Her Majesty's Inspectorate of Constabulary (HMIC) reviewing the police response to domestic abuse, the Home Secretary, Theresa May, set up a National Oversight Group to drive delivery against the eleven national recommendations given in the HMIC report. Baird became a member of the Oversight Group representing Labour PCCs. The first update on the National Oversight Group was published in December 2014.

After considering the circumstances of a rape incident in Newcastle in 2012, Baird promoted the development of new national training requirements for all door staff. These new requirements were instituted by the Security Industry Authority (SIA) in November 2013.

Together with two other North East region PCCs Baird launched the first regional Violence Against Women And Girls Strategy (VAWG) in November 2013. The strategy detailed a 20-point plan to tackle domestic and sexual abuse, trafficking and sex work, forced marriage, "honour crimes", harassment, stalking and female genital mutilation.

As a part of Northumbria's PCC VAWG strategy in February 2015:

- a Court Observer Panel was established. Consisting of volunteers, this panel monitors rape and sexual abuse court cases and reports back to the criminal justice agencies on possible improvements that may be made in the support of victims.
- a Rape Scrutiny Panel was established. This panel consists of ten specially-trained volunteers from the voluntary and community sectors with expertise in the subject. Their task is to examine case files where it's judged that no crime has been committed, or where it is said that a case has not achieved the required threshold of evidence to be sent to the Crown Prosecution Service. The Panel also examines failed prosecutions, to look for ways to improve the process for future occasions.

Baird's office founded a network of Workplace Domestic Violence Champions. Trained by the PCC Office and given ongoing support by the PCC Office, these "Champions" – employees nominated by their companies – are intended to provide a safe haven for anyone suffering domestic violence in the workplace. By 2016, some 600 such "Champions" had been created.

Leading on from the above work, in August 2018 Baird asked the North of England Soroptimists International and her Court Observers Panel to focus their attention on the work of Special Domestic Violence Courts (SDVC). These courts were rolled out across the country in 2005 and 2006 as part of a three-pronged initiative to provide more informed and safer hearings for Domestic Violence cases.

Specialist Volunteer Court Observers trained by the CPS observed 170 cases from July to September 2017 which resulted in the production of the "Specialist Domestic Violence Courts – How Special are they?" report. The report found significant gaps in the system and stated that if funding was improved, SDVCs would work as was originally intended. The report also makes a number of recommendations for how the SDVCs can be improved to deliver for victims.

=== Second term ===
Baird was re-elected to the post of Northumbria Police and Crime Commissioner in May 2016 with a majority of 121,766.

In May 2016, Baird was elected to the position of chair by the board of the Association of Police and Crime Commissioners.

In August 2016, Baird called for personal, social and health education (PSHE) to be a compulsory part of the national curriculum to assist in combating child abuse.

In December 2016, Baird, together with Northumbria Police, launched the "Words Leave Scars Too" campaign which sought to raise awareness of emotional abuse and its impact.

In 2017, Baird became a Patron for the charity Operation Encompass.

== Victims' Commissioner ==
Baird was appointed as Victims' Commissioner for England and Wales in May 2019, taking up the position in mid-June of that year. The role of the Commissioner is set out in the Domestic Violence, Crime and Victims Act 2004. Her resignation letter in September 2022 accused the government of downgrading victims' interests and side-lining the role, at the same time as the criminal justice system was "in chaos".

Baird later said that in her opinion Dominic Raab wanted a "puppet on a string" and his proposed bill of rights would undermine the rights of victims. The bill of rights tries to make it clear UK courts are not bound by rulings from the European Court of Human Rights and would, in Baird's opinion destroy "any positive impact from the victims' bill". Baird said that women and girls, who were victims of violence would be less able to push the police to perform better. Baird maintained the case of Sarah Everard and what happened since then showed victims rights should not be weakened now.

== Criminal Cases Review Commission ==
In May 2025, Baird was appointed as Chair of the Criminal Cases Review Commission on an interim basis, until December 2026. She will conduct a review of the operation of the Commission.

In July 2026, Baird's role as Chair was extended by 12 months until December 2027.

== Personal life ==
Baird married David Taylor-Gooby in Newcastle upon Tyne in 1972. They divorced in 1978 and she married Robert Brian Baird (born July 1928) in the same year in County Durham. A year later, Brian Baird died from complications following open heart surgery. She has two step-sons from him. Her interests outside politics include sport and reading. She lives in North London.

== Publications ==
Headlines from the First Three Years – 2015

== See also ==
Everywoman Safe Everywhere – Labour's Consultation on Women's Safety

Parliament of the United Kingdom
Preceded by Mo Mowlam	Member of Parliament for Redcar; 2001–2010	Succeeded by Ian Swales
Legal offices
Preceded by Mike O'Brien	Solicitor General for England and Wales; 2007–2010	Succeeded by Edward Garnier
