= List of types of fraud =

In law, fraud is an intentional deception to secure unfair or unlawful gain, or to deprive a victim of a legal right. Fraud can violate civil law or criminal law, or it may cause no loss of money, property, or legal right but still be an element of another civil or criminal wrong. The purpose of fraud may be monetary gain or other benefits, for example by obtaining a passport, travel document, or driver's license, or mortgage fraud, where the perpetrator may attempt to qualify for a mortgage by way of false statements. In contrast, a hoax is a distinct concept that involves deliberate deception without the intention of gain or of materially damaging or depriving a victim.

== Types ==
The list is not exhaustive.

- 419, see § Advance-fee
- Advance-fee – involves promising a victim a significant share of a large sum of money, in return for a small up-front payment, which the fraudster claims will be used to obtain the large sum.
- Affinity – a form of § investment fraud in which the fraudster preys upon members of identifiable groups, such as religious or ethnic communities, language minorities, the elderly, or professional groups, by gaining their § confidence and using unsuspecting community leaders to help further the scheme.
- Asset diversion, see § Insurance
- Bait-and-switch
- Bank – the use of potentially illegal means to obtain money, assets, or other property owned or held by a financial institution, or to obtain money from depositors by fraudulently posing as a bank or other financial institution. The term applies to actions that employ a scheme or artifice, as opposed to bank robbery or theft.
- Bankruptcy – concealment of assets by a debtor to avoid liquidation in bankruptcy proceedings; may include filing of false information, or multiple filings in different jurisdictions.
- Benefits (U.K.)
- Billing
- Birth certificate
- Bride
- Chargeback, Friendly – where a consumer makes an online shopping purchase with their credit card, and then requests a chargeback from the issuing bank after receiving the purchased goods or services. Once the chargeback is approved, this cancels the financial transaction, and the consumer receives a refund of the money they spent, and the merchant can be held accountable for the chargeback amount.
- Charity
- Check, kiting, paper hanging – a category that involves the unlawful use of checks in order to illegally acquire or borrow funds that do not exist within the bank account balance or account-holder's legal ownership.
- Communication, see § Phone
- Confidence trick – an attempt to defraud a person or group after first gaining their trust. They involve "voluntary exchanges that are not mutually beneficial", and benefit the fraudster ("con man") at the expense of the victim.
- Contract
- Conveyance, see § Transfer
- Counterfeiting
- Cramming – a scheme in which small charges are added to a bill by a third party without the subscriber's consent or knowledge. These may be disguised as a tax, fee, or bogus service. The crammer's intent is that the subscriber will overlook and pay these small charges without dispute.
- Creative accounting
- Credit card and Carding
- Disability – the receipt of payment(s) intended for the disabled from a government agency or private insurance company by one who should not be receiving them, or the receipt of a higher amount than one is entitled to.
- Drug, see § Pharmaceutical
- Elder – any of several types of fraud in which older people are frequently targeted, including economic abuse, § romance, § lottery, and sweepstakes.
- Electoral, or election manipulation, voter fraud, vote rigging – illegal interference with the process of an election, either by increasing the vote share of a favored candidate, depressing the vote share of rival candidates, or both.
- Email
- Embezzlement
- Employment – the attempt to defraud people seeking employment by giving them false hope of better employment, offering better working hours, more respectable tasks, future opportunities, or higher wages.
- Faked death
- Fee churning, see § Insurance
- Fertility – the failure on the part of a fertility doctor to obtain consent from a patient before inseminating her with his own sperm.
- Food fraud
- Foreign exchange, or "Forex" – any trading scheme used to defraud stock traders by convincing them that they can expect to gain a high profit by trading in the foreign exchange market. (U.S., 2008)
- Forgery
- Fortune telling fraud – a type of § confidence trick, based on a claim of secret or occult information that only the grifter can detect or diagnose, and then charging the victim for ineffectual treatments.
- Fraud in the factum – use of misrepresentation to cause one to enter into a financial transaction without understanding the risks, duties, or obligations incurred.
- Friendly, see § Chargeback
- Front running – entering into a stock trade or other securities transaction with foreknowledge of a large, nonpublic, pending transaction that will influence the price of the underlying security. See also § Securities.
- Health care, see §§ Insurance, Pharmaceutical, and Quackery
- Hoax
- honest services
- Identity theft, Impersonation – unauthorized use of another person's personal identifying information, such as name, identifying number, or credit card number (1964)
- Insurance – any act committed to defraud an insurance process. It occurs when a claimant attempts to obtain some benefit or advantage they are not entitled to, or when an insurer knowingly denies some benefit that is due. See also § Pharmaceutical.
- Internet
- Investment
- Job
- Kiting, see § Check
- Long firm
- Lottery –
  - any act committed to defraud a legitimate lottery, such as a perpetrator attempting to win a jackpot prize through fraudulent means; or in the case of a stolen lottery ticket, to defraud an individual of their legitimately won prize.
  - a type of § advance-fee fraud that takes the form of informing an individual by email, letter or phone call that they have won a lottery prize. The victim is instructed to pay a fee to enable the non-existent winnings to be processed.
- Mail and wire
- Marriage
- Medicare
- Mismarking – when a trader assigns a value to securities that does not reflect what they are actually worth, due to intentional mispricing, allowing him to obtain a higher bonus from his employer, where the bonus is calculated as a percentage of the value of his securities portfolio. See also § Securities.
- Mortgage
- Nigerian prince, see § Advance-fee
- Odometer – the practice by the seller of a used vehicle of falsely representing the actual mileage of the vehicle to the buyer, by rolling back the odometer to make it appear that the vehicle has lower mileage than it actually does.
- Overpayment
- in parapsychology
- Paper hanging, see § Check
- Passport
- Paternity
- Pharmaceutical – activity that results in false claims to insurers or programs such as Medicare in the United States or equivalent state programs for financial gain to a pharmaceutical company.
- Phone, Communication – the use of telecommunications products or services with the intention of illegally acquiring money from, or failing to pay, a telecommunication company or its customers.
- Premium diversion, see § Insurance
- Price fixing
- Push payment fraud
- Quackery – the promotion of fraudulent or ignorant medical practices.
- Racketeering
- Recruitment fraud, see § Employment
- Return
- Romance
- Intellectual property
- Scientific
- Securities
- Shill bidding
- Spyware
- Tailgating, see § Front running
- Tax
- Tech support
- Telemarketing – fraudulent selling conducted over the telephone. The term is also used for § phone fraud not involving selling.
- Slamming
- Tobashi scheme
- Transfer – an attempt to avoid debt by transferring money to another person or company, particularly with regard to insolvent debtors.
- Visa
- Vomit
- Voter, vote rigging, see § Electoral
- Weight fraud
- Welfare – illegal abuse of a state welfare system by knowingly withholding or giving false information in order to obtain more funds than would otherwise be allocated.
- White-collar crime
- Wine
- Workmen's compensation, see § Insurance

== See also ==
- Fraud Advisory Panel
- Loss prevention
- National Fraud Intelligence Bureau
- Serious Fraud Office (United Kingdom)
- Theft of services
- Whistleblower
