= Phoenix company =

Commercial entity that succeeds a collapsed one

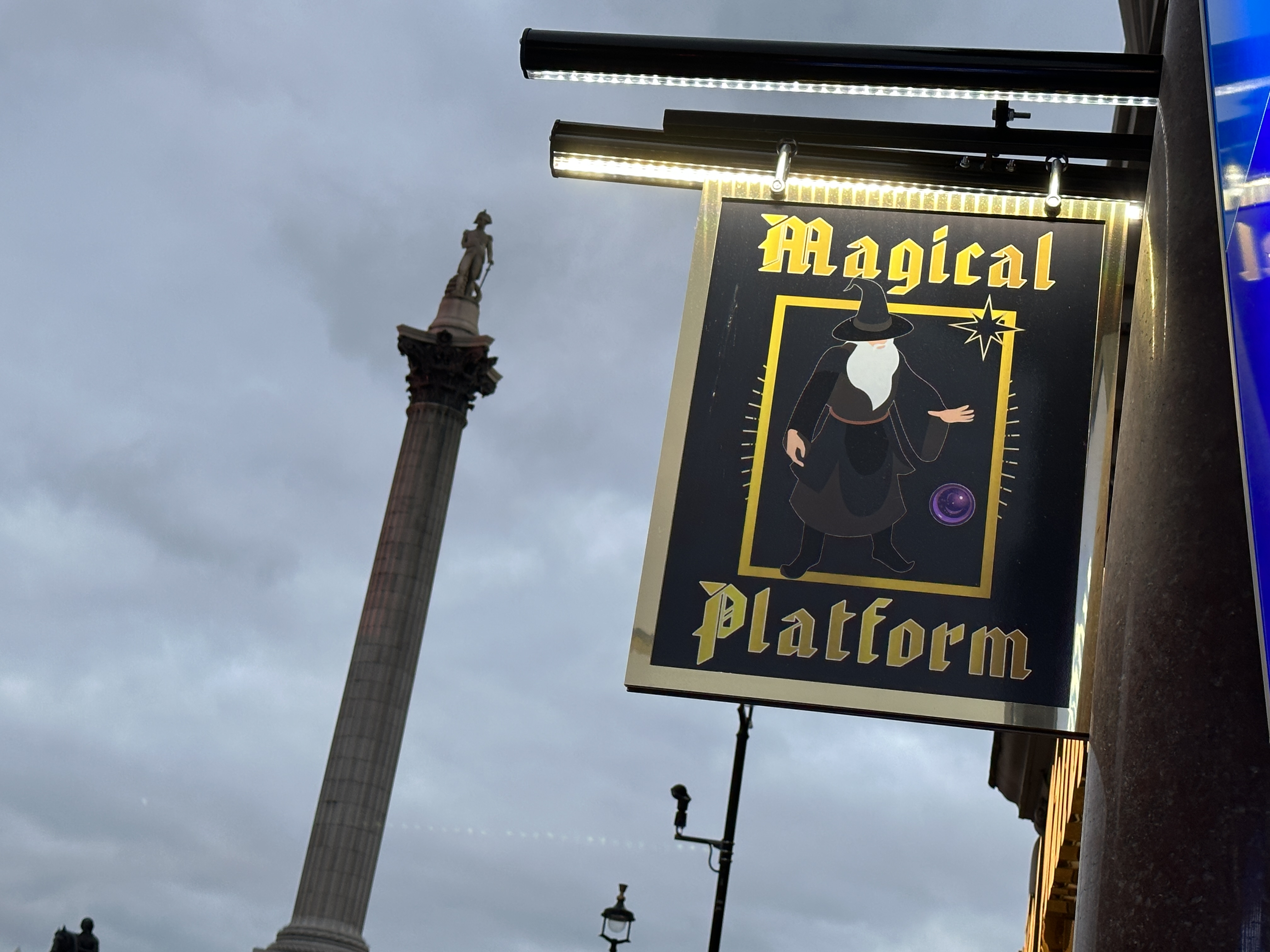
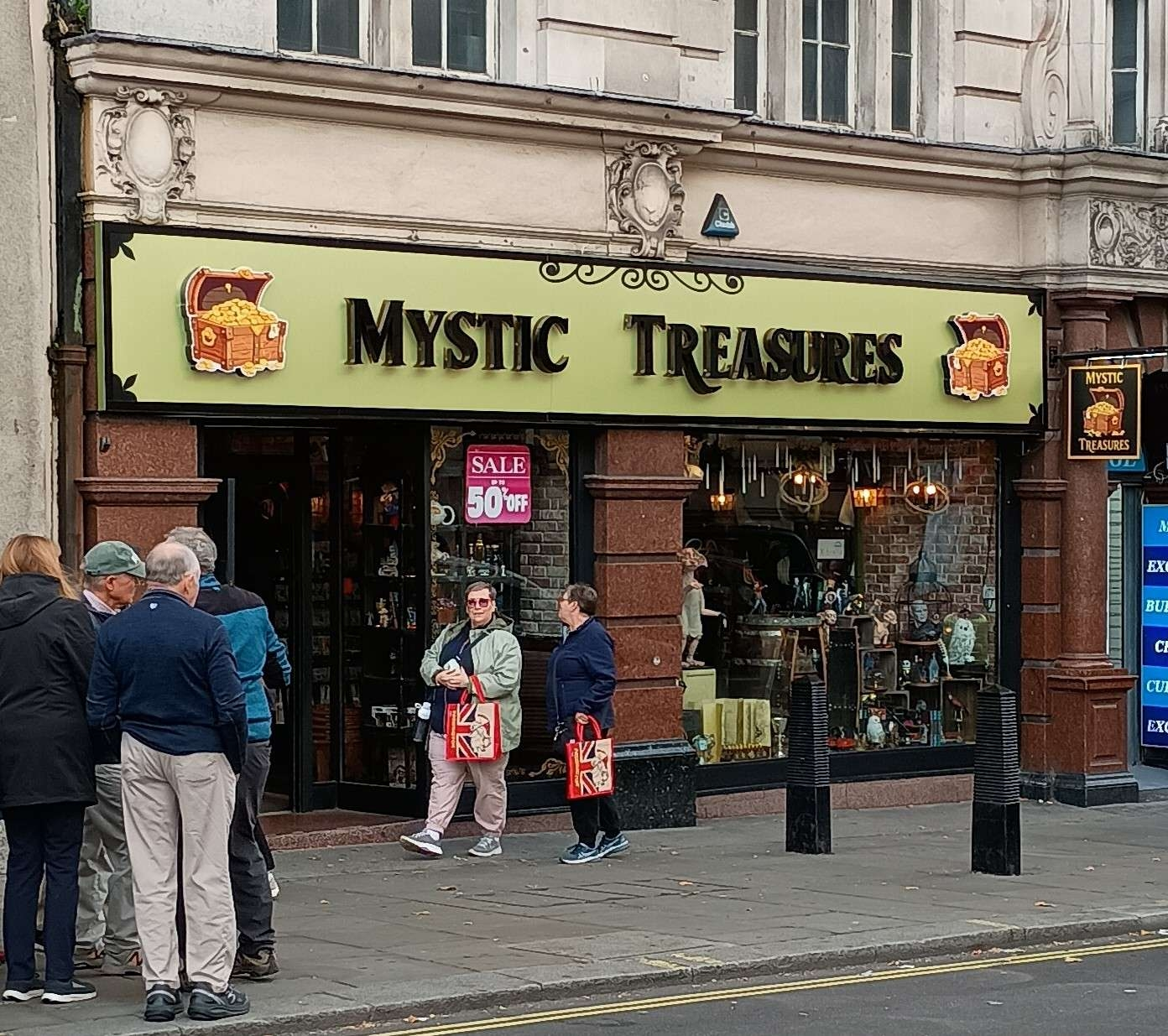
7 Whitehall is one of several unofficial Harry Potter gift shops in central London which has frequently changed legal ownership. In 2023 it was branded as "Magical Platform"; by 2025 it had become "Mystic Treasures".

A phoenix company is a commercial entity which has emerged from the collapse of another through insolvency, to replace it. Unlike "bottom of the harbour" and similar schemes that strictly focus on asset stripping, the new company is set up as a legal successor, to trade in the same or similar trading activities as the former, and is able to present the appearance of "business as usual" to its customers. It has been described as "one that arises amidst or from the disarray and demise of its predecessor." While some such companies are set up innocently, others deliberately use the process to avoid debts or taxes.

== Nature of phoenix activity ==
=== Types of phoenix company operators ===
A study by the Australian Securities and Investments Commission has identified three groups of operators that practice phoenix activity:

Innocent phoenix operators
A business gets into a position of doubtful solvency or insolvency, and directors try and recover as much as possible from the business before it collapses.
Occupational hazard
The nature of the industry may potentially heighten the risk of phoenix activity. Once a company has collapsed, the operators of the business may have little option but to return to the same industry in the form of a new business.
Careerist offenders
These operators purposely structure their operations in order to engage in phoenix activity and to avoid detection. These offenders are often selective as to which debts they will pay throughout the life of the company.

At a basic level, phoenix activity is the replacement of one entity by another. A more sophisticated approach may have regard for the intricacies of corporate groups, where management and directors may misuse the concept of the corporate veil.

Certain sectors see more phoenix activity than others. In the events industry, public relations and marketing agencies are known to "phoenix" regularly.

=== Phoenix scenarios ===
Phoenix activity is generally observed to occur through the following scenarios:

"One after the other"
A closely held company is formed, which operates for a period of 6–24 months. During that time, it accumulates large debts, stalls creditors for as long as possible, and, when pressure becomes too great, it goes into liquidation. Another company, frequently with a very similar name, purchases the productive assets and takes over the operations of the failing company. Often the new company operates out of the same premises, with the same suppliers, employees and customers.
Management company
The productive assets are kept in a management company, which is kept solvent. A second labour supply company employs the workers and conducts the principal business operations. Profits are stripped from the second company through high rates charged for the use of the first company's assets, which leaves the second with insufficient funds to pay its liabilities. Eventually, the second company will be liquidated, with little to no capital reserves, and a new one will rise in its stead.
Labour hire
This structure utilizes a management company, a sales company and a labour hire company. The sales company receives all the income arising from the business, while the management company charges the sales company for the use of the assets. The labour hire company employs the workers, for which the net pay is reimbursed by the sales company but not the payroll deductions or taxes. Often the labour hire company is a façade, merely issuing payment summaries, while the sales company pays the workers directly. Eventually the labour hire company is forced into liquidation, while the underlying assets are preserved in the management company.
Shadow directors
Former directors can control a company through spouses, relatives and associates. There is little to prevent a disqualified director from giving advice as an employee of a successor company.

=== Indicators of abuse ===
The primary identifiers of abusive phoenix activity have been described as "a deliberate and often cyclical misuse of the corporate form accompanied by a fraudulent scheme to evade creditors". Several common characteristics have been identified as indicating harmful phoenix activity:

1. the failed entity is formed with only a nominal share capital
2. the failed entity is under-capitalized
3. the directors/managers/controllers of the failed and successor company are the same
4. the failed entity is trading whilst insolvent
5. assets of the failed company are depleted shortly before the cessation of business
6. the failed company makes preferential payments to key creditors to assure supply to the successor company
7. the failed entity was operated to evade prior liabilities
8. the successor company operates in the same industry
9. the successor company trades with the same or similar name
10. the successor company commences trading immediately prior to, or within 12 months of, the cessation of the failed entity
11. assets of the failed company are transferred at below market value to the successor company
12. many of the employees of the failed company are re-employed by the successor company

== United Kingdom ==
Company law in the UK has been formed to enable such activity in order to protect and promote entrepreneurship, by reducing risk and improving the chances of continued trading and business development. The National Fraud Authority has observed that:

It is perfectly legal to form a new company from the remains of a failed company. Any director of a failed company can become a director of a new company unless he or she is:

- subject to a disqualification order or undertaking;
- personally adjudged bankrupt;
- subject to a bankruptcy restriction order or undertaking.

Other less scrupulous directors may undertake such activity in order to evade liabilities to workers that accrue from continuous employment, such as the right to claim for unfair dismissal, or to receive statutory redundancy payments. The Employment Appeal Tribunal has held that such moves are generally barred under s. 218 of the Employment Rights Act 1996.

The law allows the directors of a failed company to be reinstated in the same, or similar posts in the phoenix company, within limits. The Company Directors Disqualification Act 1986 prohibits directors whose conduct led to the insolvency of a company from taking on similar roles elsewhere for a prescribed length of time. S. 216 of the Insolvency Act 1986 provides for both criminal and civil liability where directors or shadow directors of a company that has entered into liquidation become a director, or otherwise involved in the formation or management of another company that operates under the same or a similar name to the insolvent one, within the following twelve months of such liquidation. (Note: Except where leave of the court has been granted, or prescribed circumstances are met, in which case Part 4, Chapter 22 of the Insolvency Rules 1986 governs the manner in which notice must be given to creditors.) Remedies include petitioning the High Court to wind up a company, as in the 2014 case of Pinecom Services Limited and Pine Commodities Ltd (which had continued a business previously shut down in the public interest).

=== Criticism ===
There has been criticism in both the media and in Parliamentary quarters, as to the adverse effect on small to medium-sized suppliers to a failed company, whose position as creditors leaves them having to write off bad debt from the former company, with the phoenix company having shed all liability to cover the debt. Moreover, the House of Commons' Business and Enterprise Select Committee also raised concerns that the law may "adversely affect competitors, who will continue to carry costs which the phoenix company has shed."

== Australia ==
Phoenix activity was identified in government reports as early as 1994, and the 2003 Final Report of the Royal Commission into the Building and Construction Industry devoted a chapter to its practice in that sector of the economy.

It has attracted the attention of the Australian Securities & Investments Commission, the Australian Taxation Office and the Fair Work Ombudsman, who have been pursuing those undertaking such practices to evade liability under their respective statutes. (Note: being, respectively, the Corporations Act 2001, the taxation and superannuation statutes, and the Fair Work Act 2009) The Treasurer of Australia issued proposals in 2009 on options to deal with fraudulent phoenix activity, and the Parliament of Australia passed several Acts in 2012 as a result. (Note: Corporations Amendment (Phoenixing and Other Measures) Act 2012 (48). 2012. and Tax Laws Amendment (2012 Measures No. 2) Act 2012 (99). 2012.) An exposure draft was also issued for comment on the question of whether to assign joint and several liability to directors of phoenix companies in certain circumstances, but limited legislation directed at illegal phoenix activity was passed. In 2015 two significant government reports were released that included a consideration of how best to address phoenix activity: the Productivity Commission Report Business Set Up, Transfer and Closure, and the Senate Economic References Committee Report: I just want to be paid: Insolvency in the Australian Construction Industry. Despite the frequency and volume to attention given to phoenix activity by government and regulators, scholars note that "[t]here is no law in Australia that defines 'phoenix activity', nor declares it illegal"; "phoenix activity is an operational term, not a legal one".

The economic cost of phoenix activity has been estimated in 1996 by the Australian Securities Commission, and in 2012 by the Fair Work Ombudsman. While there is economic cost associated with all phoenix activity, the underlying behaviour is not always illegal and this makes estimating the economic costs associated with illegal phoenix activity extremely difficult.

Enforcement activity has been active under the Corporations Act:

- Several significant cases have dealt with the liability of directors conducting such activity. (Note: Jeffree v National Companies and Securities Commission, [1990] WAR 183 (where a director transferred the business name and assets from one company to another, in order to avoid paying an arbitration award); R v Heilbronn [1999] QCA 95, (1999) 150 FLR 43 (26 March 1999) (where the director of a company with substantial sales tax liabilities stripped the company of its assets and transferred them to another company, and then to a third company, while carrying on the same business under the same trading name, and without adequate consideration being given in each transfer to satisfy outstanding liabilities).)
- In ASIC v Somerville, the New South Wales Supreme Court, in a significant extension of liability, found that a legal advisor was not just complicit in certain directors’ breaches of duty, but was in fact instrumental in structuring new companies into which the assets of various insolvent companies were transferred. ASIC only sought disqualification for the advisor, but there has been debate as to whether it should have also sought compensation for creditors or a penalty in the circumstances.

The Fair Work Ombudsman has also investigated several high-profile cases:

- An abattoir business in New South Wales was pursued several times: initially for closing a business, terminating the staff, and setting up a new one while refusing to rehire ex-employees who were union members; and later for hiring workers through a separate subsidiary who worked for another connected company, and then draining the first company of funds after terminating several workers, before sending it into liquidation.
- A sole director of a transport company was fined for forcing a company into liquidation in order to avoid a claim by an employee for underpayment of wages.

== See also ==
- General Motors, an example of a phoenix company (vis a vis Motors Liquidation Company, the "original" General Motors).
