= Barbara Judge =

American-British lawyer and businesswoman (1946–2020)

Barbara Judge CBE
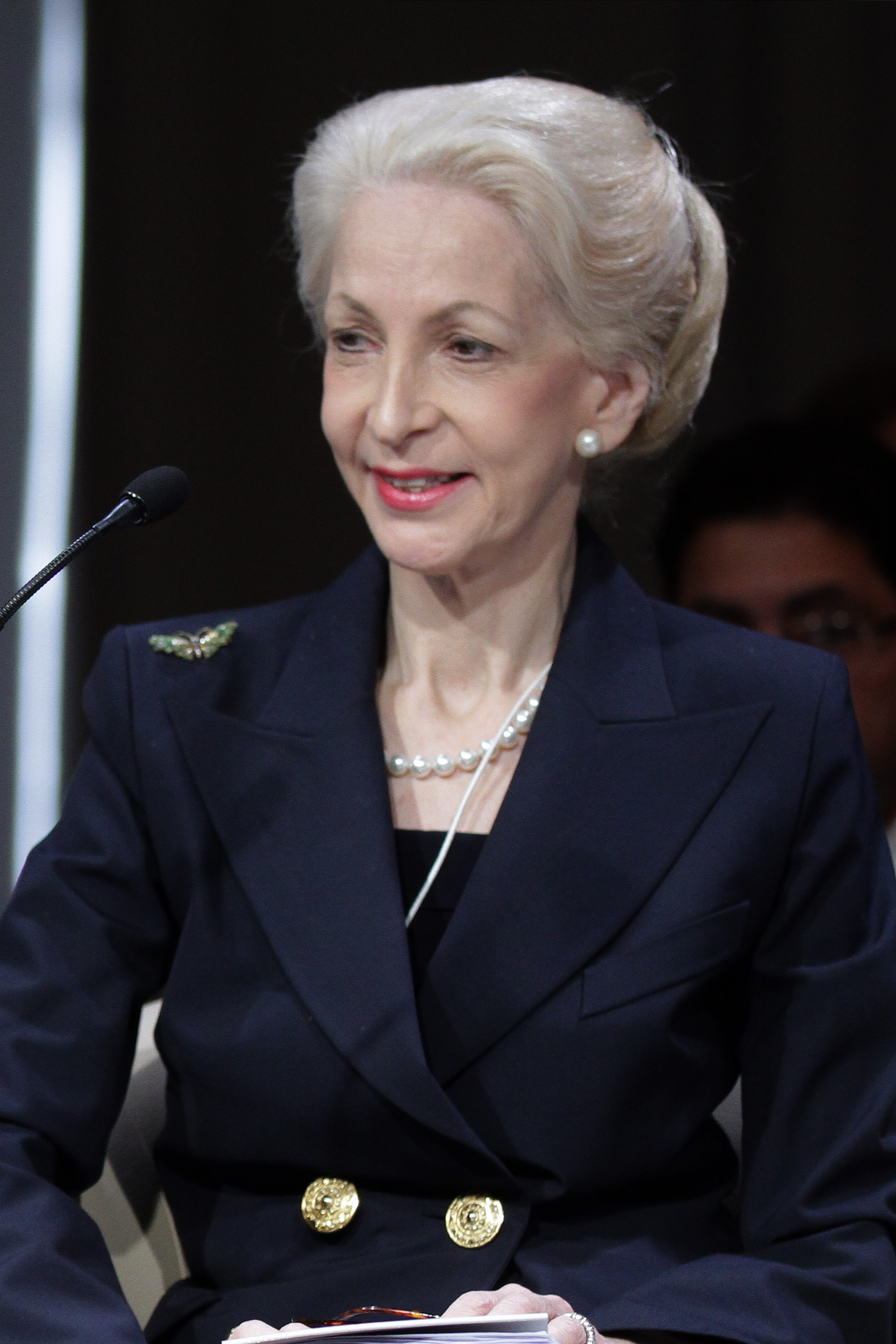
- Judge in 2011
- Born: Barbara Sue Singer; 28 December 1946; New York City, U.S.
- Died: 31 August 2020 (aged 73); London, England
- Education: University of Pennsylvania (BA); New York University (JD)
- Occupations: Lawyer and businesswoman
- Known for: Nuclear power; Pensions; Corporate governance; Japanese corporate governance; Women in business; Restaurant reviews
- Board member of: Pension Protection Fund; CIFAS; TEPCO Nuclear Reform Monitoring Committee; Association for Consultancy and Engineering; Royal Academy of Arts; Historic Royal Palaces; Dementia UK
- Spouses: Theodore J. Kozloff (m. 1967, divorced) Allen L. Thomas (m. 1979; div. 2001) Sir Paul Judge (m. 2002; died 2017)
- Children: 1
- Awards: Commander of the Order of the British Empire

Barbara Thomas Judge, Lady Judge CBE (née Singer; 28 December 1946 – 31 August 2020), previously known as Barbara Singer Thomas, was an American and British lawyer and businesswoman, based in London with dual American-British citizenship.

She was the first female chairman of the Institute of Directors, a previous chairman of the UK Atomic Energy Authority (UKAEA), the chairman of the United Kingdom's fraud prevention service Cifas, a chairman of the Pension Protection Fund and a British business ambassador on behalf of UK Trade & Investment. She was a trustee of several cultural and charitable institutions and a former trustee of the Royal Academy of Arts and Dementia UK.

She was often considered one of the UK's most prominent business executives, featuring in power lists compiled by Management Today, Debrett's and BBC Radio Four's Woman's Hour, the latter describing her as "one of the best-connected women in Britain".

== Early life ==
Barbara Sue Singer was born on 28 December 1946 at Doctor's Hospital in Manhattan, New York City, the daughter of Marcia (Bosniak) and Jules H. Singer. Her father owned a small business; her mother was associate dean of students at New York Institute of Technology. Singer grew up in Saddle Rock, New York.

Judge frequently cited her mother as the most significant influence on her life and work. In her own work, Marcia Singer devised courses helping women into work, advising them "wear white gloves" – which meant dress appropriately – write a CV, and answer advertisements even though they said "men wanted". Singer remained in work until she was 88 but was diagnosed with dementia soon after retirement. This experience shaped Judge's belief that remaining in work is crucial to longevity and happiness in old age. She has said that her mother taught her and many other women that a woman should work "not because they were poor or alone ... [but] because they had a brain and they should use it and they should earn their own money, because money was independence". Her mother also taught that women "can have a serious career and also be a serious mother".

In an interview with CNN, Judge said, "Growing up, my milieu was like Betty Draper in Mad Men – the one who goes to a good college, marries a nice guy and lives in Connecticut and has two children and slowly goes mad, and that could have been me if my mother hadn't told me there was another way." Her personal ambition was to "die at [her] desk"

== Education ==
She earned a B.A. degree in medieval history from the University of Pennsylvania in 1966, writing her thesis on John, King of England. She worked her way through university as a model, tutor, computer programmer and occasional waitress. She also met her first husband, Theodore Kozloff, there.

In 1969, she graduated from New York University School of Law, where she specialised in tax law, finishing with a Juris Doctor in 1969.

She was a member of the Order of the Coif, a John Norton Pomeroy Scholar, a former editor of the New York University Law Review and the recipient of the Jefferson Davis Prize in Public Law. While at NYU School of Law, she received American Jurisprudence Prizes in Excellence in 15 out of 28 subjects; these prizes were awarded to the student with the highest grade in the course.

== Career ==
=== Law ===
Her first job after graduation was in 1969 with the law firm Paul, Weiss, Rifkind, Wharton & Garrison, where she worked as a corporate lawyer. In 1973, she joined the law firm Kaye, Scholer, Fierman, Hays, and Handler, where she specialised in corporate law and financial transactions, becoming a partner in 1978. At that time she married Allen L. Thomas.

=== Government and regulation ===
In 1980, Barbara Thomas was appointed by President Carter as a member of the U.S. Securities and Exchange Commission (SEC) in Washington, D.C., for a five-year term. Her appointment was widely reported, being the youngest-ever SEC commissioner and only the second woman in the role. She was instrumental in opening U.S. capital markets to foreign companies. She also negotiated on behalf of the U.S. government to open the Tokyo Stock Exchange to foreign members, against opposition from some US financial commentators, who believed that American investors would be uninterested in Japanese stocks. She later described these achievements as among the most significant of her career.

Later, as Lady Judge, she was a deputy chairman of The Financial Reporting Council.

She also worked in various capacities for the British Government's Department of Trade and Industry and its Department for Constitutional Affairs, as well as a public member of the International Ethics Standards Board for Accountants.

In April 2010, Judge was appointed chairman of the Pension Protection Fund (PPF), which provides compensation to employees with pension schemes in bankrupt firms. She was the first woman to serve in the role. She was reappointed as chairman in 2013 and completed her second (and maximum) term in July 2016. She advocated that the pension regulator be given the power to block companies from deals that would harm pension scheme members, referring to Sir Philip Green's sale of British Home Stores to Dominic Chappell. Judge was a supporter of auto-enrolment in pension schemes.

In May 2016, Lady Judge was announced as the chairman-elect of Cifas, the UK's fraud prevention service. Cifas is a not-for-profit company working to protect businesses, charities, public bodies and individuals from financial crime. She succeeded Ken Cherrett in September 2016.

In February 2018, Judge was appointed chair of the Astana Financial Services Authority in Kazakhstan.

=== Banking and private equity ===
In November 1983, after the birth of her son, Barbara Thomas left the SEC and moved to Hong Kong with her husband to be a regional executive director at Samuel Montagu & Co.; by that appointment she became the first woman to be appointed an executive director of a British merchant bank. In 1987, she became senior vice president and group head of international private banking at Bankers Trust in New York.

In 1988, she gave a character reference for Charles Keating, a former client of Kaye, Scholer. Keating was head of Lincoln Savings and Loan Association and American Continental Corporation, two companies whose collapse a year later formed part of the Savings and Loan crisis; later she was one of a number of professionals named in a resulting class action. Judge disputed the claim but settled out of court to avoid a protracted court case.

In 1994, she moved from New York to London with her husband and her son, whom she wanted to raise in England. Subsequently, she worked in the private equity industry in the UK, including an acquisition of Scotia Haven Food Group and Whitworths Food Group; she also founded Private Equity Investor plc.

=== Media ===
In 1993, Barbara Thomas was an executive director of Rupert Murdoch's News International.

=== Education and arts ===
Judge was the first woman on the Board of Overseers of the Wharton School of Management at the University of Pennsylvania and a founding director of the Lauder Institute of Management at Wharton, as well as a member of the Board of Trustees of New York Institute of Technology.

Judge was on the governing bodies of the School of Oriental and African Studies, Sabancı University, the Energy Institute at University College, London, and the Ditchley Foundation.

She was a trustee of the Wallace Collection. She was an Honorary Visiting Professor in Experiential Leadership and Head of Council for the Cass Global Women's Leadership Programme, completing her one-year term in June 2018.

In January 2016, Lady Judge was appointed the first female chairman of the Advisory Board of the Association for Consultancy and Engineering (ACE), succeeding Sir John Armitt.

She was a trustee of Historic Royal Palaces, Inc and of the Royal Academy of Arts, where she was an active fundraiser and chairman of the Benjamin West Patrons Group.

She was also a visiting fellow of the University of Oxford Saïd Business School at the Centre for Corporate Reputation.

Judge funded a scholarship for black African women to study at the School of Oriental and African Studies in London. She sat on the advisory board for Accelerate-Her, a network in support of women working in technology.

=== Health ===
Judge was chairman of the management board of SNOMED International, a not-for-profit organization that owns, administers and develops SNOMED CT. She was appointed to Dementia UK's Board of Trustees in January 2015. She was an advisor to The Cambridge Code, a firm providing software-based diagnostic tools.

=== Fossil fuels ===
Judge was on the board of the US coal group Massey Energy. Her principal role there was corporate governance, but also included roles on the finance, safety, environmental and public policy committees at the time of the Upper Big Branch Mine disaster that killed 29 workers in Beckley, West Virginia. She resigned from the board three weeks after the disaster, citing other ongoing business activities. Judge was not personally criticised in the official report into the disaster, written by the US Government's Mine Safety and Health Administration. Before the disaster, Judge and other directors were criticised by CtW Investment Group, a shareholder activist group affiliated with the Change to Win Federation, a coalition of American labour unions including the International Brotherhood of Teamsters. CtW questioned Judge's ability to devote sufficient time to the Massey board role; she went on to be re-elected to the board unopposed.

=== Nuclear power ===
Lady Judge became a non-executive director in 2002, and in 2004 the chairman, of the UK Atomic Energy Authority (UKAEA). She was succeeded by Roger Cashmore in 2010, after the sale of the UKAEA's decommissioning business to Babcock International Group in 2009.

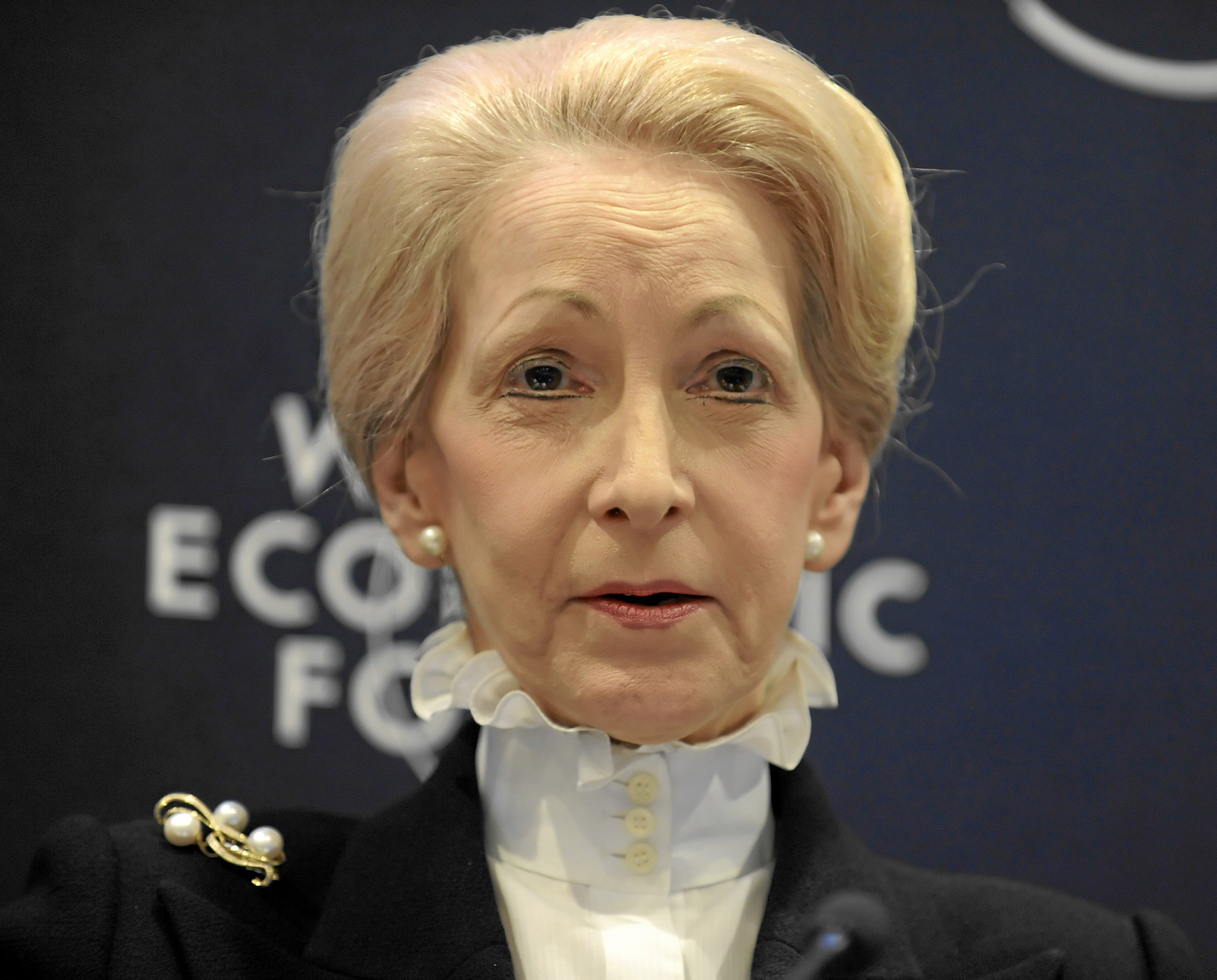
Judge at the World Economic Forum in 2010

Judge's initial brief from government ministers was to "hold and fold" the UKAEA before shutting it down, at a potential loss of 2,800 jobs. Judge proposed an alternative plan, where the business would be built up, internationalised and then privatised. The agency's main business was decommissioning old British nuclear sites; Judge pushed for similar contracts on sites in the former Soviet Union and pursued partnerships in countries such as Korea. She also lobbied the Tony Blair government to end its opposition to nuclear power. These activities publicised the work of the agency amid an increase in positive sentiment towards nuclear power in the mid-'00s, with governments commissioning new reactors in order to meet carbon emission targets. She describes her time with UKAEA as "like spinning straw into gold", referring to her initial brief to close down the agency. In 2010, she was appointed Commander of the Order of the British Empire (CBE) for services to the Nuclear and Financial Services Industries.

In October 2012, Judge was appointed deputy chairman of Tokyo Electric Power Company's Nuclear Reform Monitoring Committee and chairman of its Nuclear Safety Task Force. The Monitoring Committee is an advisory body of domestic Japanese and international experts which supervises the activities of the Task Force. Judge has argued that it is particularly appropriate for a woman to join the group, as women are typically the most vocal opponents of nuclear power. She believed nuclear energy is critical to the security of energy supply and its associated national security, and that nuclear power has as much of a role to play in carbon reduction as renewable energy sources.

Judge has been on the International Advisory Board for the development of nuclear energy in the United Arab Emirates and has led a trade delegation to India to discuss how British companies could take part in the construction of six nuclear reactors at Jaitapur. In 2016, Judge was appointed to the International Advisory Group of the Jordanian Atomic Energy Commission. She has called for a transition arrangement for the UK's membership of Euratom prior to Brexit and a structured relationship with Euratom thereafter.

=== Institute of Directors ===
In 2015, Lady Judge became the first woman to be appointed as Chairman of the 113-year-old Institute of Directors (IoD), the British members' organisation which works in promotion of company directors and corporate governance. Judge said she had a "three part mission" to her tenure, using her position to open doors for women to become chief executives; to encourage the IoD to host entrepreneurship; and to encourage older workers to remain in the workforce as both employees and paid mentors to younger generations of entrepreneurs.

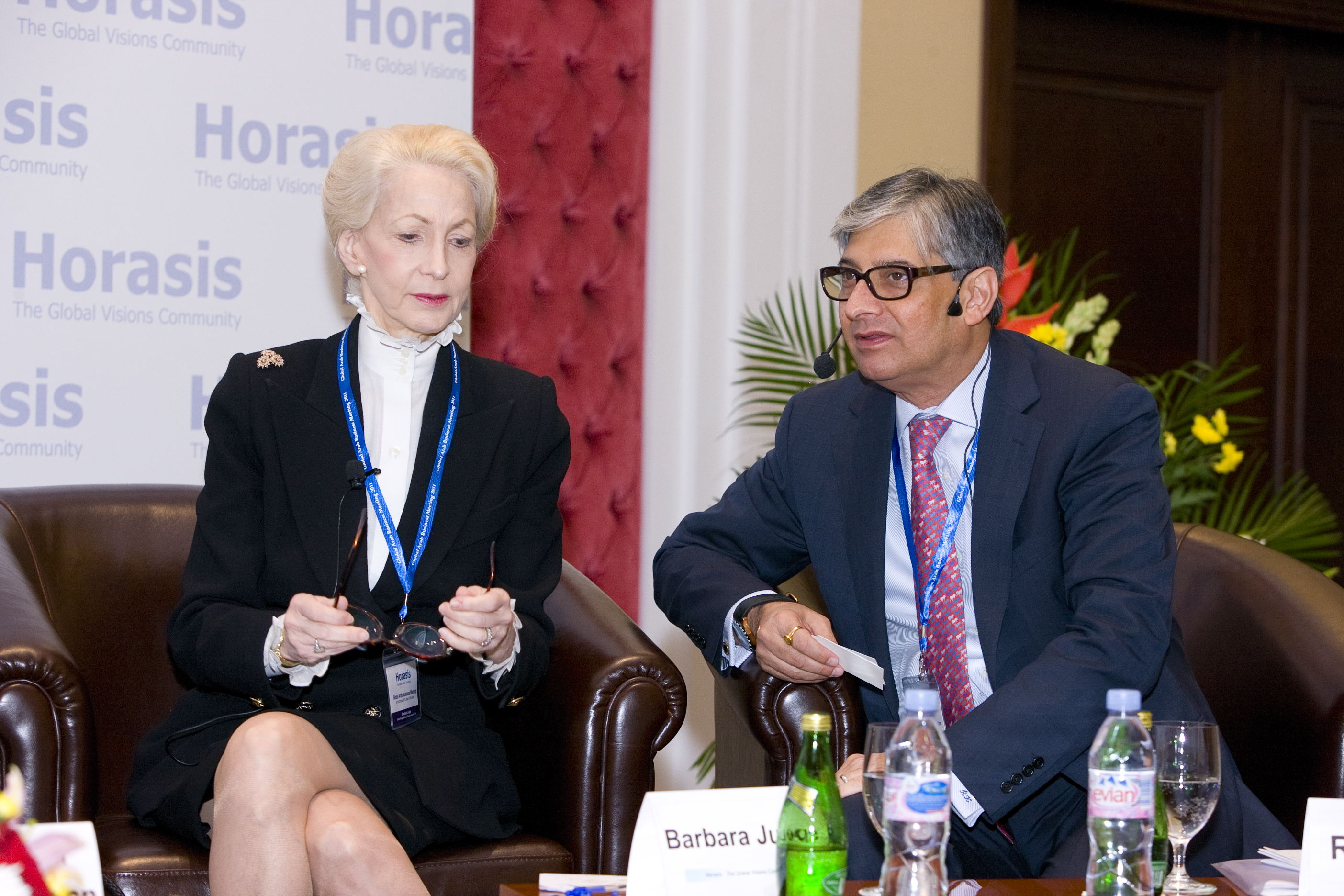
Judge with Nicco Group Chairman Rajive Kaul in 2011

She advocated for schools to instil self-belief and optimism in girls, and for female STEM students to be encouraged into traditionally male careers such as engineering. She believed that the emphasis on placing women into non-executive roles must be augmented by a similar effort to get women into chief executive roles, with companies helping to alleviate the "pressure points" for women with family responsibilities, which often include caring for elderly parents as well as children. Judge has advised women in business to learn accountancy, explaining, "That's where the power lies." Judge also wanted the IoD to enable young entrepreneurs to connect with older executives, by pairing them in an alumni programme.

Referring to the pension deficit at British Home Stores, Judge called for the Pensions Regulator to have power of binding veto over mergers and acquisitions activity in firms of a certain size, so that a purchasing firm must present a detailed plan for addressing any deficit in the pension fund of the target firm. She also called for a corporate governance code for large privately owned companies.

Judge called for the introduction of tax allowances to help adults learn new workplace skills. In a 2017 article for The Telegraph online, she argued that older workers and older entrepreneurs were needed to address the negative social impact of automation and an ageing population, and that older workers were often better placed to start their own businesses than their younger counterparts, many of whom lack contacts, capital and experience.

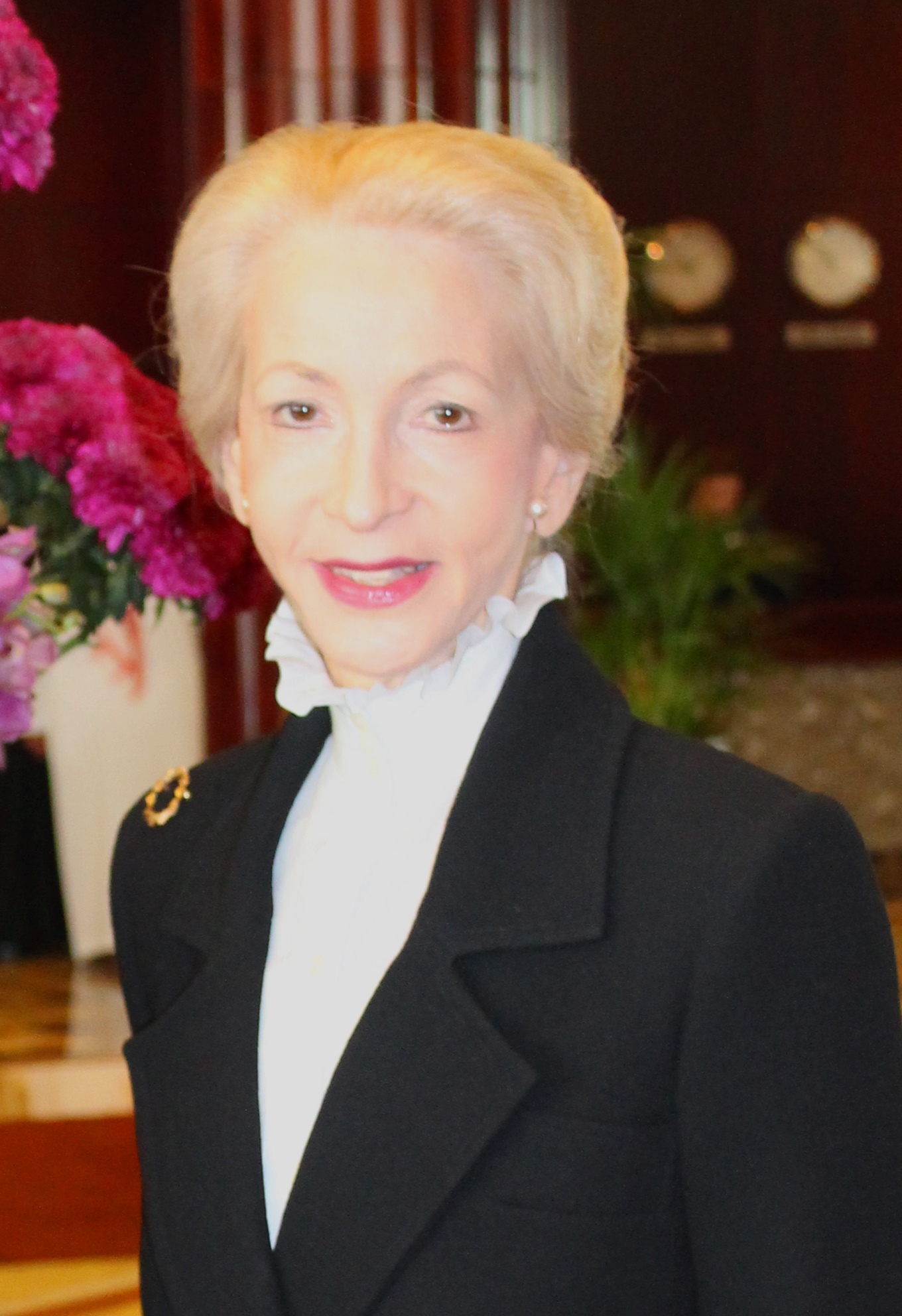
Judge in 2015

Regarding Brexit, Judge called for Britain to establish a post-Brexit EU trade deal prior to leaving the Union, followed by a transitional period and tariff-free EU-UK trade thereafter. She also called for the British Government to clarify the rights of EU citizens already in the UK and of British citizens living in the EU, and to clarify the extent to which common rules and standards will be upheld with EU counterparts. She believed that "...creativity, confidence and patience" are the defining qualities of entrepreneurship, and that it is with these qualities that Britain will meet the challenges and opportunities of Brexit.

=== Suspension and resignation ===
Judge was suspended from the role on 9 March 2018 following press reports of allegations of racism and sexism made against her in the IoD office. The Guardian reported that Judge was "understood to have been recorded covertly by the IoD's director general, Stephen Martin" and to have said, "We have three inexperienced people doing a job [on the IoD's secretariat] when one experienced person could do it and they are making mistakes. And so the problem is we have one black and we have one pregnant woman and that is the worst combination we could possibly have. No, two blacks and one pregnant woman. I couldn't believe it!"

Later the same day, Judge resigned. In her resignation letter she wrote, "I continue to strongly refute the allegations made against me and remain deeply disturbed by the gross and conspiratorial mishandling of the process which has led to the damaging circumstances in which I and the Institute are now placed". Judge also said, "My acknowledgment that issues of race and pregnancy could complicate their removal both legally and from the standpoint of public perception is an observation I believe most lawyers would make, and that many non-lawyers also know to be true. I was addressing the likely consequences of their dismissal, not the reasons for it."

In September 2018, it was announced that Judge would be succeeded by Charlotte Valeur.

== Personal life ==
In 1967, she married Theodore J. Kozloff. After the two divorced, Judge married Allen L. Thomas in 1979 and the two would divorce in 2001. In 2002, she married Paul Judge and would remain married until his death in 2017.

Judge was a restaurant reviewer for Forbes.com and formerly The Daily Telegraph and the Daily Express. Her Forbes column began in 2013 and was based on venues she visited on business trips. She had a particular interest in writing about desserts, a course she characterised as "...a free sin".

Judge died on 31 August 2020 from pancreatic cancer at her home in London, at age 73.

== Honours and awards ==
In 2010, Judge was appointed Commander of the Order of the British Empire (CBE) for services to the Nuclear and Financial Services Industries.

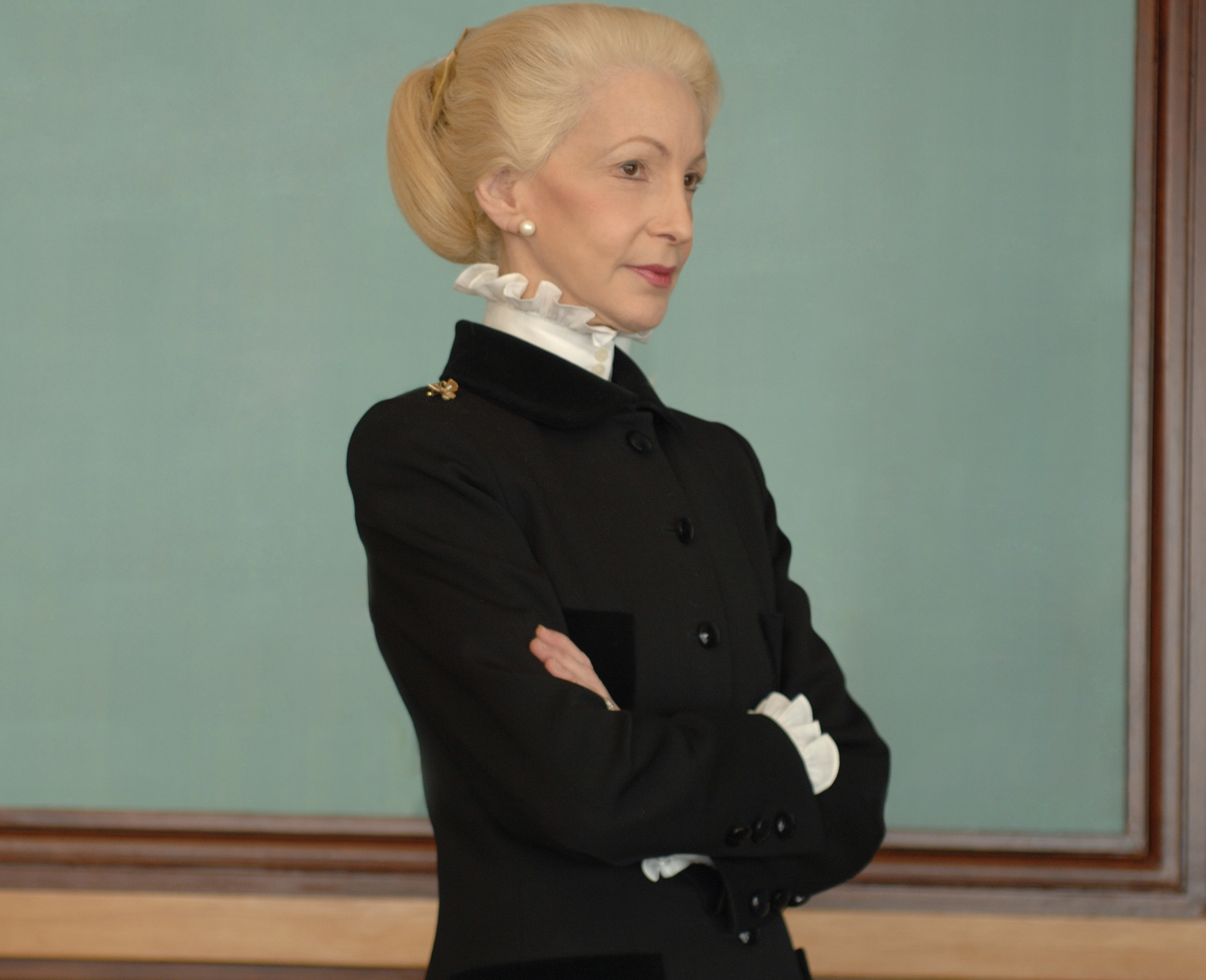
Judge in 2011

Woman's Hour on BBC Radio 4 listed Judge as one of the 100 most powerful women in the UK. Square Mile magazine listed her in its "Top 100 Most Powerful People in the City of London". She also appears in lists of influential individuals compiled by Management Today and Debrett's.

In 2008, she was made an honorary graduate of the University of Suffolk. In 2012, she was awarded an honorary Doctor of Science degree from The University of Buckingham. In 2015, she was awarded "Non-Executive Director of The Year for A Public Sector Organisation" title, in respect of her chairmanship of the Pension Protection Fund.

In 2011, the National Portrait Gallery purchased a portrait of Judge, by the photographer Alexander McIntyre.

In 2017, Lady Judge was listed as one of the "100 Coolest People in UK Tech" by Business Insider and was given the Forward Ladies Lifetime Achievement award.

== Women in business ==
Judge was a well-known commentator and activist for women in business, being the first female director to be appointed to a British merchant bank, the first female executive director at News International and first female chairman of the Institute of Directors.

She argued that women have a moral and social responsibility to help other women. She has said her interest in the topic stems principally from her mother, but also from not having a daughter. When asked by a job interview panel at the Bank of England to name her greatest accomplishment, she replied that she had once taken a nine-month sabbatical to help her son Lloyd cope with dyslexia.
