= Cifas =

UK fraud prevention service

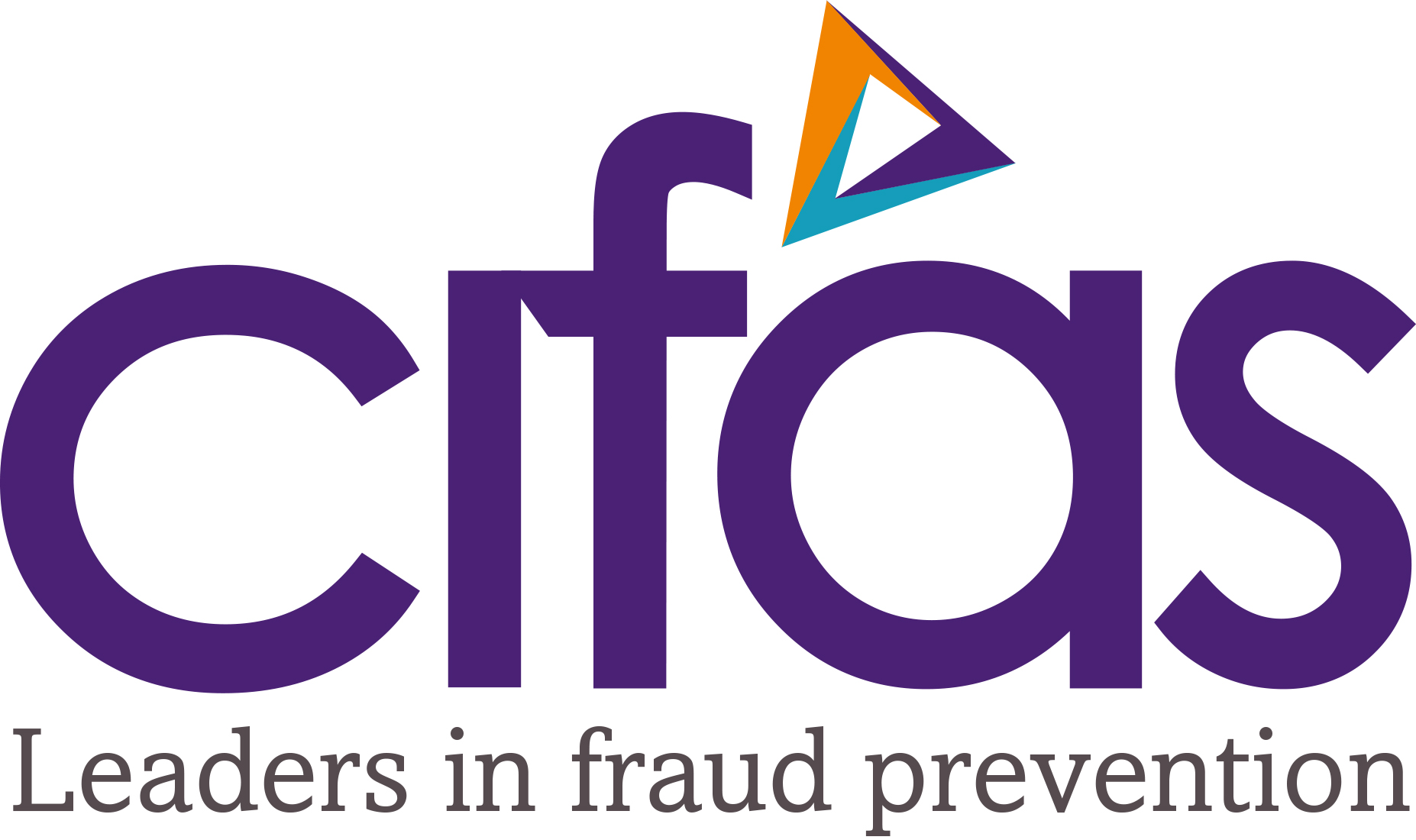
- Type: "Not-for-profit" organisation
- Industry: Fraud prevention
- Founded: 1988
- Headquarters: London WC1, UK
- Key people: John Browett (Chairman, 2020–present); Barbara Judge CBE (Chairman, 2016–2020); Ken Cherrett (Chairman, 1990–2016); Vic Ware OBE (Chairman, 1988–1990); Mike Haley (CEO, 2018–2024); Simon Dukes (CEO, 2013–2018); Peter Hurst (CEO, 1999–2013); Alan Hilton (CEO, 1990–1999); Anthony Sharp (CCTA, 1988–1990)
- Products: National Fraud Database; Internal Fraud Database
- Number of employees: 98

Cifas is a fraud prevention service in the United Kingdom. It is a not-for-profit membership association representing organisations from across the public, private and voluntary sectors. Cifas states its mission is "to detect, deter and prevent fraud in society by harnessing technology and working in partnership".

Cifas operates two core fraud prevention databases that are claimed to be the largest in the UK: the National Fraud Database and the Internal Fraud Database. Since December 2014, Cifas' systems are used by banks and building societies to access Home Office immigration data through a specialist portal.

Data from Cifas' members indicated that instances of identity fraud in the UK were at record levels in the UK in 2016, particularly among people aged under 30.

Cifas data also highlights the growing issue of "money mules" – people who allow their bank accounts to be used to launder money.

== History ==
Cifas was established in 1988 by the Consumer Credit Trade Association (CCTA) under the acronym CIFAS: Credit Industry Fraud Avoidance System, although the company no longer operates under this acronym as the scope of its services has broadened. It was developed in association with the Office of Fair Trading, as well as the Information Commissioner's Office, who continue to this day to take an active interest in the development of Cifas.

Cifas is today run by a board of directors, which includes both independent directors who are not directly involved in the day-to-day running of the organisation, and the Chief Executive and Chief Operating Officer, who are. From 1988 to 2016 the majority of the directors were elected by participating organisations. They now participate in the governance of the organisation through an "Advisory Board".

== Fraud databases ==
Cifas' National Fraud Database allows participating organisations to exchange details of applications for products or services which are considered to be fraudulent, inconsistent or suspicious; exchange information about accounts and services which are being misused; and information about insurance and other claims that are considered to be fraudulent, inconsistent or suspicious.

Organisations can also exchange information about innocent victims of fraud to protect them from further fraud.

Cifas reported that more than 444,000 cases were recorded in the National Fraud Database in 2025. This was the highest yearly total since the database began and a 6% rise on 2024. Facility takeover, in which criminals take control of existing accounts, made up more than 78,000 of these cases, or 18% of all filings. Identity fraud remained the largest category, with more than 242,000 cases (54% of the total), and a newly added category for money mule activity recorded more than 22,000 cases.

The Internal Fraud Database allows participating organisations to exchange details of cases where an applicant or member of staff is considered to have acted fraudulently. Individuals suspected of committing fraud can have a fraud marker placed against them, and they may be denied financial services such as mortgages, credit or even phone contracts.

Under the Data Protection Act, an individual has the right to make a subject access request to Cifas, who will, in accordance with the Act and its exemptions, disclose data held on the individual where the law requires it. Cifas is not a credit reference agency but is the data controller for Cifas data and responsible for its accuracy.

== Complaints ==
All warnings used to be examined by specialist fraud staff in participating organisations, but now, automated systems may be used to refuse a product or service without any investigation of a warning. Cifas says: "The ability to make automated decisions allows members to immediately decline facilities to subjects who are deemed an immediate fraud risk. This is another massive step forward in utilising the data from Cifas, freeing up resources from reviewing referrals that have already been deemed a high fraud risk."

Consumers who are disadvantaged by this change in practice may complain to the Information Commissioner and seek financial compensation from both Cifas and the responsible organisations who supplied and used the information. Consumers may also complain to one of the ombudsman services who cover the organisations represented within Cifas. This includes the Financial Ombudsman Service, the Communications Ombudsman, the Public Services Ombudsman, and the Local Government & Social Care Ombudsman.

== Immigration Act 2014 ==
In 2014, the Immigration Act became law. Cifas was named as the sole provider of Home Office Immigration Data and launched the Cifas Immigration Portal (CIP) in December 2014. All current account-providing banks and building societies in the UK are required to use the CIP to access the Home Office data on disqualified persons. The data was implicated in the Windrush scandal.

== Other services ==
Victims of identity fraud or people who are at risk of identity fraud can apply for Cifas protective registration for a £30 fee. Protective registration acts as a warning the organisation should (but they are not forced to) carry out additional checks to verify the identity of the applicant or customer. They may just refuse the product or service instead as they consider the fraud risk to be too high.

Cifas used to operate a Protecting the Vulnerable scheme that helped local authorities protect individuals subject to the Mental Capacity Act 2005 in their care. This was merged into the Vulnerability Registration Service in 2020.

== Financial stability ==
Cifas has declared losses and surpluses in its published accounts as follows:

| Year | Loss |
|---|---|
| 2017 | £749,000 |
| 2018 | £578,000 |
| 2019 | £1,328,000 |
| 2020 | £1,389,000 |
| 2021 | £627,000 |
| 2022 | £442,000 |
| 2023 | £301,000 Surplus |
| 2024 | £370,000 Surplus |

Losses between 2017 and 2022 amount to £5.1 million in total. In 2023 Cifas returned to a surplus.

The Directors reports consider that the organisation is a well funded going concern with break-even achievable. Costs grew from £5.6 million to £14.5 million between 2016 and 2024. Cifas is funded largely from levies on financial services suppliers and other participating organisations funded by customers, and public sector organisations that are funded by taxpayers.

The financial benefits of Cifas, reported by its participating organisations, are reducing relative to its size, with benefits per pound of subscription income as follows:

| Year | Benefits |
|---|---|
| 2018 | £234 |
| 2019 | £208 |
| 2020 | £169 |
| 2021 | £139 |
| 2022 | £112 |
| 2023 | £196 |
| 2024 | No Figure Published |

The amount of fraud prevented by Cifas, as a proportion of total losses, suggests it has become much less effective, so much so, no figure has been published for 2024.

== Collaborations and partnerships ==
Cifas works with fraud prevention, financial, public sector, academic and charitable organisations and law enforcement to raise awareness of fraud and promote best practices in fraud prevention. Collaborative partners include the City of London Police, CIPFA, the Home Office, Age UK, the Fraud Advisory Panel, and UK Finance.

== See also ==
- Credit card fraud
