= Everywoman Safe Everywhere – Labour's Consultation on Women's Safety =

Labour's Consultation on Women's Safety, 'Everywoman safe, everywhere' was a UK policy consultation set up by Labour Shadow Home Secretary Yvette Cooper MP in November 2011. It was chaired by former solicitor general Vera Baird QC supported by Kate Green MP (Shadow Minister for Equalities) and Stella Creasy MP (Shadow Home Office Minister) and was established to examine the cumulative effects of Coalition Government policy on women's safety, reporting its findings to the Labour Party’s policy making process. The consultation planned to hold events across the country with local women's groups to examine the impact of the Government's spending and policy changes on women's safety, and to consider potential legislative measures that could safeguard women’s safety despite the downturn and the lack of available public funds.

== Overview ==
Chair of the Consultation Vera Baird has said:

Violence against women support services are falling like ninepins from the dual blows of local authority and government funding... Following Kenneth Clarke's ill-informed comments on rape the impression is that nobody is fighting women's corner in a sea of disregard.

We will call for evidence, hold hearings, talk to survivors of violence, travel nationwide and do everything we can to ascertain whether these worries are justified, how to point this out to the government so they an put them right and how women's safety can be improved not endangered.

Wherever I go, organisations and individuals tell me of their concerns that the Coalition doesn't understand women's issues. They quote tax and welfare and public sector jobs cuts driving women out of work back into the home, and making them vulnerable by removing the power of income and independence from them.

== Submission of evidence ==
The consultation held its first evidence session in London on Monday the 19th of December 2011 with ten expert organisations on women's safety giving evidence on the impact of recent Government decisions to their work. As well as calling for evidence to be brought forward at events across the UK, the consultation also encouraged submissions through its website.

== Provisional report ==
The consultation issued a provisional report on International Women's Day, 8 March 2012. It looked at how government policy and funding affected women’s safety, eg, through changes in legal aid, welfare and housing. A final report was published in December 2014.

== See also ==
- Istanbul Convention
- Vivien Stern, Baroness Stern
- Domestic Violence Disclosure Scheme (Clare's law) 2014
- Domestic Abuse Act 2021
