= National Fraud Intelligence Bureau =

UK government agency

- Abbreviation: NFIB
- Formation: 2006
- Type: Governmental
- Purpose: Intelligence gathering and analysis to combat fraud
- Parent organisation: City of London Police
- Website: Report Fraud

The National Fraud Intelligence Bureau (NFIB) is the police unit in the United Kingdom responsible for gathering and analysing reports of fraud and financially motivated cyber crime reported by the public. It passes intelligence to police forces and other law enforcement bodies as part of the UK's multi-agency structure, in accordance with the government's overall strategy for combatting fraud. The NFIB is managed by the City of London Police as part of its role as the National Lead Force for fraud, funded by the Home Office.

Central to the NFIB's operations is their operation of the public-facing Report Fraud service. This replaced their widely-criticised service named 'Action Fraud' in 2025.

== Operations ==
As of 2023, fraud is estimated to comprise about 40% of all crime reported in the UK. As one of several agencies involved in intelligence gathering and response to fraud, in accordance with the government's 2023 Fraud Strategy and that of the City of London Police, the NFIB analyses information from a large number of organisations within the public and private sectors, including two industry bodies Cifas and UK Finance.

Due to the volume of reports submitted being more than can be assessed manually by police officers, systems automatically analyse and compare the range of evidence contributed. This is then assessed for patterns of crime by specialist teams addressing fields such as insurance, intellectual property and card payments. Intelligence reports (or 'packages') from these assessments are then sent to relevant regional police or law enforcement organisations for investigation in real time.

Data from the NFIB is used by the National Economic Crime Centre to coordinate the UK’s response to economic crime overall. The City of London Police also shares information with the National Cyber Crime Unit and is informed by various other public and private sector bodies as part of the UK's Join Fraud Taskforce.

The method by which the NFIB gathers intelligence from the public is through the 'Report Fraud' system, the UK's national reporting, data collation and support service for fraud and financially motivated cyber crime. The service has a website and call centre which provides information about different types of fraud, and offers fraud prevention advice and victim support. Individuals and businesses can report incidents (such as forwarding scam emails for inspection) on the website or by telephone. When a fraud is reported, victims are given a crime reference number, and the case is passed to the Report Fraud Analysis Services. This service also publishes aggregate data showing trends, demographics and other information about fraud on its website.

The service does not have investigative powers, but its 'prevention and disruptions' team can prevent further frauds by requesting the removal of websites, phone lines and bank accounts. Other responsibilities include working with the National Cyber Security Centre to help businesses and individuals protect themselves from cyber crime, and to inform police forces in best practice. The NFIB also hosts the Economic and Cyber Crime Academy (ECCA), which provides training in anti-fraud techniques for private and public sector organisations.

== History and criticism ==
The National Fraud Intelligence Bureau (NFIB) was created as part of the recommendations of the 2006 National Fraud Review. Originally the responsibility of the National Fraud Authority, oversight was transferred to the National Crime Agency together with the City of London Police in 2014. About 90 investigators worked at the NFIB in 2018.

Initially, the NFIB maintained a service called 'Action Fraud' set up in 2013, performing a similar function to Report Fraud. There were about 85 call-handling staff working on the Action Fraud helpline in November 2014, which fell to 70 by December 2015. Numbers increased to about 80 staff in 2018.

Action Fraud became widely criticised for inadequacies and failing to fulfil its purpose. An investigation in 2018 by Which?, the Consumers Association, found that only a quarter of cases were passed on to local police forces for action, and that fewer than 4% of cases handled by Action Fraud resulted in anyone being charged or otherwise dealt with by the justice system (this compared, for example, with 80% of cases involving drug abuse). An investigation by The Times in 2019 revealed that call handlers working for the police insulted victims and had been trained to mislead them into thinking their cases would be investigated when most were never looked at again. This lack of effectiveness led to the agency being referred to as "Inaction Fraud".

After a critical review in 2019 by HMICFRS and as a result of being found to be unfit for purpose by a Justice Committee report in 2022, it was announced in 2023 that the service would be replaced by one to be provided by Capita and PwC called the Fraud and Cyber Crime Reporting and Analysis Service (FCCRAS) at an initial estimated cost of £150m. While later reported to have been £31m with an overspend of just £52,000, it was after some delays expected to reach £212 million (2025) (US$279.31 million) in total. Later re-named Report Fraud, it became the new system for reporting and analysis of fraud and cyber crime in England, Wales and Northern Ireland on December 4th, 2025.

== See also ==
- City of London Police
- National Crime Agency
- National Cyber Crime Unit
- Serious Fraud Office
- Fraud Advisory Panel
- British intelligence agencies
- National Police Chiefs' Council
