= Vomit fraud =

Type of fraud

Vomit fraud is a type of fraud in which a driver of a vehicle for hire falsely claims that an "incident requiring cleanup" occurred while a passenger was riding in the driver's vehicle. The company then charges the passenger a "cleanup fee" to reimburse the driver for having to clean the vehicle.

== History ==
The Miami Herald first reported on the issue in July 2018. Passengers may face a fee of up to US$150 for causing incidents requiring significant cleanups of drivers' vehicles. By filing false reports of these incidents, drivers will receive the cleanup fees from the customers even though no incident occurred.

== Criminality ==
Due to company-friendly terms of service typically agreed to by passengers, police departments have been reluctant to press criminal charges against individuals who engage in the fraud, instead treating these cases as civil matters. However, in late October 2018, a Harwood, North Dakota, man who had driven for both Uber and Lyft was charged with two counts of attempted theft of property for two separate instances of false cleanup claims. In one instance, the man was caught on surveillance video purchasing food, throwing it on the inside and outside of his vehicle, taking photos of the alleged damage, then running the vehicle through a car wash, all after he had already dropped his passenger off at his destination.
