= Fraud Advisory Panel =

UK charitable organization

- Abbreviation: FAP
- Formation: 2001
- Founder: Institute of Chartered Accountants in England & Wales
- Founded at: United Kingdom
- Type: Charitable Organization
- Purpose: Preventing and mitigating fraud
- Headquarters: Fraud Advisory Panel Chartered Accountants' Hall Moorgate Place London EC2R 6EA
- Chairman: Sir David Green CB QC
- Key people: Mia Campbell
- Website: https://www.fraudadvisorypanel.org

The Fraud Advisory Panel is a UK charitable organisation. Incorporated in 2001, the Panel focuses on offering advice and education to the general public on how to mitigate and avoid fraud. Panel members have provided evidence to the House of Commons Treasury Select Committee and frequently participate in government consultations and commentary on the television, radio, and newspapers.

The Panel was established in 1998 by the Institute of Chartered Accountants in England & Wales, which continues to support its work.

== Governance ==
The FAP is a charitable company limited by guarantee in England and Wales (charity number 1108863; company number 04327390). It is governed by a board comprising between three and fifteen trustee directors. Trustees are experienced counter-fraud professionals drawn from across sectors. ICAEW also has the right to appoint one third of the directors. The board is led by a chairman, a voluntary position that has been held by the following people:

- George Staple CB QC (2001–2003)
- Rosalind Wright CB QC (2003–2014)
- David Kirk (2014–2019)
- David Clarke (2019–2022)
- Sir David Green CB QC (2022–)

Dominic Grieve QC, the former Attorney General became a patron of the Panel on 7 September 2018.

In January 2021, the charity had two members of staff, Mia Campbell and Zara Fisher.

== Membership ==
Membership of the Panel is open to individuals and organisations that are concerned about the harm caused by economic crime and want to do something about it. Membership offers various benefits including the opportunity to keep up to date with trends in the counter fraud field, meet fellow counter-fraud professionals, exchange insights and influence change to protect society from crime. Corporate membership has the added benefit of making a public demonstration that the organisation is committed to supporting initiatives that fight fraud. The Panel also offers a student membership that provides eligibility to apply for the Panel's mentoring scheme. Those new to the profession have a dedicated group that is free to join called the Future Fraud Professionals Network with its own committee structure that arranges regular professional events and social events.

The ICAEW is a funding members; other corporate members at January 2021 included:

- Access Bank plc
- Association of Chartered Certified Accountants (ACCA)
- Association of Certified Fraud Examiners (ACFE)
- Baker Tilly
- BDO
- CIFAS
- Consultative Committee of Accountancy Bodies (CCAB)
- Ernst and Young
- Financial Conduct Authority
- Grant Thornton
- International Compliance Association
- JMW Solicitors
- KPMG
- Law Society of England and Wales
- Moon Beaver
- Pinsent Masons
- PWC
- Smith and Williamson
- Tenet Litigation and Compliance
- Synectics Solutions

== Annual Lecture ==
Chief among the Panels series of events is the publication of a special report and an annual lecture at the Annual General Meeting held in the summer. The lecture has been delivered by a number of distinguished people with notable experiences in the field of fraud including:

- 2016, Former Attorney General Lord Peter Goldsmith QC PC. Special Report: The Fraud Review 10 years on.
- 2017, Former UBS trader and convicted fraudster Kweku Adoboli. Special Report: Businesses Behaving Badly.
- 2019, Investigative Journalist Oliver Bullough, Special Report: Hidden in Plain Sight.
- 2020, Film maker and convicted tax fraudster Chris Atkins, Special Report: Calm Before the Storm.

== International Charity Fraud Awareness Week ==
The Fraud Advisory Panel partnered with the Charity Commission for England and Wales to launch the International Fraud Awareness Week to help charities and not for profit organisations to avoid falling prey to fraud. The week includes webinars, news interviews and the publication of freely accessible anti-fraud advice.

In 2017, the FAP called for fundraising pages to be regulated amid fraud concerns following the launch of bogus Just Giving pages soon after the Westminster Bridge terror attacks.

The FAP has issued a wide range of guidance to help protect charities from economic crime and cyber crime including advice on how to avoid COVID-19 related fraud and these are available free of charge on their website.

== COVID-19 Fraud Watch ==
In 2020, the Panel established a COVID-19 Fraud Watch task force with Cabinet Office, City of London Police and over seventy other partners to quickly disseminate counter fraud advice and intelligence to protect society. It was reported that the group identified various fraud risks concerning taxpayer backed stimulus packages and other fraud and actionable intelligence was shared with government. The task force operated for 6 months and published sanitised information and counter-fraud advice for the public via its cross-sector partners and the charity's website.

Crime trends, prevention advice and lessons learnt from the COVID-19 Fraud Watch task force have continued to be shared across sectors to alert businesses and encourage vigilance and due diligence as the world comes out of the crisis. This included free webinars tailored to sectors such as a Law Society podcast interview with David Clarke that was made available for the public.

== Appeal for government transparency ==
=== Call for names of companies receiving Bounce Back Loans to be published ===
In June 2020, they alerted Rishi Sunak MP, UK Chancellor of the Exchequer, National Audit Office and others to the risk of fraud against the government tax-payer backed stimulus schemes. The advice to Sunak was contained in a letter that was signed by David Clarke the chair of the Panel and former Director of the police National Fraud Intelligence Bureau, Duncan Hames of Transparency International, Susan Hawley of Spotlight on Corruption, Rosalind Wright, former Director of the Serious Fraud Office and Professor Mike Levi of Cardiff University and Senior Associate of RUSI.

The letter cautioned that a lack of due diligence on customers left the Bounce Back Loan Scheme particularly vulnerable to fraud and the authors requested that the names of companies receiving loans be published to prevent and identify fraud. The letter was shared with the National Audit Office (NAO) and later published online. Whilst the names of some companies that received BBLS loans was published by Finance UK as case studies, the government and British Business bank declined to publish the names of all recipients. In the summer of 2020, reports of fraud against the taxpayer backed BBLs schemes began to emerge that mirrored the concerns highlighted in the letter to the Chancellor.

=== Extent of Bounce Back Loan Fraud ===
In October 2020, the NAO published a report following its investigation into the Bounce Back Loan Scheme and warned that taxpayers may lose £26bn on unpaid loans and an influential committee of MPs the government's plans to recoup losses was "woefully underdeveloped". Types of fraud included criminals using the identities of innocent companies to obtain BBLS loans leading to criticism that some banks were not doing any due diligence. Interviewed by CityAM, FAP chair David Clarke drew a comparison with the Sub-Prime Mortgages crisis saying, “As we saw with the self-certified subprime loans scandal pre-2008, fraudsters including bank insiders see [BBLs] as an easy target” .

On 20 December 2020, the FAP Chairman David Clarke was cited as saying that in 10 years time, people will still be looking for taxpayer backed money lost to fraud. On 23 January 2021, it was reported that three men working for the same London financial institution had been arrested by the National Crime Agency as part of an investigation into an alleged fraudulent coronavirus bounce back loans totalling £6m. City AM also reported that UK banks had begun to claw back money fraudulent bounce back loans. On 23 January 2021, it was reported that the NCA had arrested three men who worked at the same London financial institution in connection with an investigation into coronavirus Bounce Back Loan fraud totalling £6 million. The City workers were suspected of using their 'specialist knowledge' to perpetrate the fraud. The article quoted the letter sent to Chancellor Rishi Sunak by the Panel and others in June 2021, calling on Government to publish names of recipients of taxpayer-backed loans to prevent such fraud.

In January 2021, The Times reported that Britain would bow to European Union State Aid rules and disclose the names of companies that received taxpayer-backed loans, quoting Lord Myners as saying the government was being, “very slippery” over refusing to publish the identities of companies accessing COVID loans amid concerns about potential fraud and politically embarrassing awards.

The scale of fraud against the Bounce Back Loans Scheme and how the UK police had begun 'hunting down fraudsters' featured in a BBC story by Angus Crawford aired on BBC Television news on 5 February 2021.The report included an interview with FAP chairman David Clarke who warned that "Covid-19 fraud could potentially be the biggest fraud in history". On 1 March 2021, LBC News reported that four men aged 82, 52 and 30 and a 70-year-old woman had been arrested on 24 February over an alleged £500,000 Bounce Back Loan fraud.

== Abuse of company incorporation ==
In 2012, the Panel published a special report on the abuse of company incorporation to facilitate fraud and since then has lobbied for reforms to the system of company formation. The Panel was critical of a decision to reduce the cost of registering a company in 2016

Frances Coulson, an insolvency lawyer and FAP Director warned that company incorporation was being used to launder dirty money and “All the indicators are that it’s getting worse.” In later interviews, Coulson said, “We have a very light-touch touch entry point for limited liability, so you can buy a company off the shelf for £9.99,” adding, “You can acquire a veneer of respectability without any substance behind it.” Coulson has expressed concern that enforcement action is not being taken saying, “Part of the raison d’etre for the enforcement is the protection of the public,” and “[This] doesn’t sound as if it’s happening.” when commenting on a case in County Durham. In that instance, hundreds of people were paid to be directors of shell companies, many with no real staff or operations in the UK but acted as conduits for millions of pounds in revenue from online porn and gambling.

In 2020, the Panel Chairman David Clarke provided commentary in The Times and OCCRP following an investigation by journalists looking into a global web of firms created by a company formation agent called Formations House. Criticising the ease with which criminals abuse company incorporation he was quoted as saying, "Britain has become a dreamland for the corrupt".

Information leaked to OCCRP resulted in allegations that the system of company incorporation in the UK and other jurisdictions is broken and was being abused by criminals and corrupt officials to disguise their assets, source of wealth and beneficial ownership of businesses.

== Organised crime ==
The FAP highlights the threat posed to civil society from serious organised crime groups and has produced guidance on what measures governments, businesses and other bodies can take to fight serious economic crime. As part of a BBC Panorama investigation entitled, Gangsters Dirty Money Exposed, aired on 27 April 2018, the Panel provided an opinion on allegations of money laundering in London by the Ukrainian Mafia.

The FAP has called on banks to refund innocent victims of fraud and in a BBC Watchdog Live interview about a case where a NatWest bank customer had £20,000 stolen while 'unconscious', lawyer and FAP deputy chairman Arun Chauhan said of the bank, "They accept he's been assaulted and they accept the transactions were by a third party, so unless they can prove gross negligence, or fraud on Arthur's behalf, he needs to be compensated."

== Domestic corruption ==
In a special report titled "Hidden in Plain Sight", published in July 2019, the Panel warned that domestic corruption in the UK is going unnoticed. Chairman David Clarke told the Evening Standard, "Corruption isn’t a single event or act; it is a process whose ultimate objective is to create a culture in which it can become the new normal. Everywhere we look in Britain today we see signs that just such a culture is beginning to take root." and called for better controls to fight corruption and money laundering.

Writing in The Times in December 2019, Clarke warned that "Britain has become a dreamland for the corrupt", in part due to the ease with which criminals can incorporate a company and the country's limited enforcement of the law as evidenced in the case of a company formation agent exposed by the ICIJ. The warning mirrored concerns he had raised in 2014 that companies and real estate in the London were being used to by criminals to launder the proceeds of crime.

== Awards ==
In 2018, the Charity Fraud Awareness Week led by the FAP, won the Government Counter-Fraud Award for Outstanding International Collaboration in recognition of the work to unite more than 40 charities, regulators, professional bodies and other stakeholders across the world worked together to help combat fraud targeted towards charities.

== Appearances on television and radio ==
Members of the FAP Board frequently appear on television and radio to provide independent, expert opinion and advice on a range of fraud related matters. These include appearances on BBC Business News and BBC World Service and the BBC's Charity Fraud Cheats and Rip Off Britain series, including a case in which one presenter, Gloria Hunniford was herself the victim of fraud when a criminal impersonated her and stole £120,000 from her Santander Bank account.
