= Authorised push payment fraud =

Financial fraud where victim is enticed into making payment to a fraudster

Push payment fraud (also known as "authorised push payment fraud" or APP fraud) is a form of fraud in which victims are manipulated into making real-time payments to fraudsters, typically by social engineering attacks involving impersonation. These authorised frauds can also be related to investment scams, where the victim is tricked into sending money for investments that do not exist, and to romance scams, where the fraudster tricks the victim into thinking they are in a relationship. The opposing type of fraud is known as "pull payment fraud", which occurs when an account holder provides a payee with the relevant bank account details enabling a fraudulent payee to take (or "pull") funds from the payer’s account.

== Worldwide ==
=== Canada ===
A subset of push payment fraud is bank investigator fraud. The fraudster poses as an authority or bank investigator and persuades the victim to transfer the funds from their original account (which is claimed to be "compromised") to another account owned by the fraudster (but ostensibly setup for the victim). Banks had refused to reimburse victims for such scams since the victim authorized the movement of funds. The Canadian Anti-Fraud Centre has recorded $11.7 million in victim losses from bank investigator scams in 2025 alone.

=== United Kingdom ===
Until 2019 in the United Kingdom, because the victims of these frauds authorised the payments, albeit mistakenly, they were typically not fully reimbursed by their banks. In September 2016, Which? raised a super-complaint regarding push payments and calling for changes in legislation to provide better protection for innocent bank customers. The Payment Systems Regulator (PSR) investigated and found within "a short space of time" that the UK banks could work together in a better way to avoid scams and that some banks needed to do more to identify "potentially fraudulent incoming payments". The regulator was also concerned that there was limited information available on the scale and nature of the problem. The PSR initiated a consultation process in November 2017, which was completed in February 2018. In March 2018 a "draft contingent model code" was published.

From May 2019 some victims were able to receive refunds under the Contingent Reimbursement Model Scheme, a voluntary scheme overseen by the PSR which provides protections for customers of signatory firms, subject to a number of exclusions.

New rules were introduced on 7 October 2024 covering claims for reimbursement for amounts up to £85,000.

According to UK Finance, its member firms reported £576.4 million of APP fraud losses in 2025, up 19% on 2024, from 248,070 confirmed cases. Of that total, £354.3 million was returned to victims through bank refunds or recovery of funds from the receiving accounts. Investment scams made up £221.5 million, or 38% of APP losses.

=== Ireland ===
KPMG has reported that the Central Bank of Ireland set out its APP fraud banking expectations in its Consumer Protection Outlook Report 2023. The Central Bank requires financial businesses, to operate "effective measures to mitigate the risk of fraud", taking a proactive approach, and helping customers where necessary to recover funds where possible.
