= National Fraud Authority =

Former UK government agency

Executive agency overview
- Formed: October 2008
- Dissolved: March 2014
- Jurisdiction: United Kingdom
- Headquarters: London
- Executive agency executive: Stephen Harrison, Chief Executive

The National Fraud Authority (NFA) was an executive agency of the United Kingdom Home Office responsible for increasing protection for the British economy from the harm caused by fraud. The NFA worked with a wide range of partners with the aim of making fraud more difficult to commit in the UK.

Formerly the National Strategic Fraud Authority, it was set up in October 2008 in response to the government's Fraud Review in 2006. It concluded that fraud was a significantly under-reported crime, and while various agencies and organisations were attempting to tackle the issue, greater co-operation was needed to achieve a real impact within the public sector. The scale of the problem pointed to the need to bring together the numerous counter-fraud initiatives that existed, which is when the NFA was formed.

The Chief Executive was Stephen Harrison.

The Home Secretary Theresa May announced in December 2013 that the NFA would be closed on 31 March 2014. Strategic development and threat analysis was transferred to the National Crime Agency, Action Fraud was transferred to the City of London Police, the e-confidence campaign transferred to the Home Office, and responsibility for the development of the Counter-fraud Checking Service was taken on by the Cabinet Office.

== Functions ==
The NFA worked to tackle various types of fraud, including identity fraud, mortgage fraud, accommodation addresses, mass marketing fraud and fraud affecting small- and medium-sized businesses. The NFA produced the Annual Fraud Indicator, which estimated the cost of fraud. The last estimate made put the cost of fraud to the UK at £52 billion a year. Working with the charity, Victim Support, the NFA also worked with victims to ensure they received support if they have been a victim of a fraud crime.

== Action Fraud ==
Action Fraud is the UK's national fraud reporting service, run by a private sector company for the NFA. Action Fraud provides information and advice about fraud, as well as a service to report fraud. British citizens can report fraud on the Action Fraud website (including forwarding scam emails for inspection) or by telephone. When a fraud is reported, victims are given a crime reference number and their case is passed on to the National Fraud Intelligence Bureau (NFIB), which is now run by the City of London's police service. The Action Fraud website also has an A-Z of fraud describing different types of fraud, and offers prevention advice.

As of November 2014, there were 85 call-handling staff employed by the Action Fraud helpline.

== Annual Fraud Indicator ==
The NFA published the Annual Fraud Indicator every year, which was the UK's official estimate of how much fraud costed the country. The annual fraud indicator for 2012 was published in March 2012, and estimated that fraud costed the UK over £73 billion that year. This was up from £38 billion in 2011. When broken down by sector, the indicator revealed that fraud losses to the public sector amounted to £20.3 billion, the private sector lost £45.5 billion, the not-for-profit sector lost £1.1 billion and individuals lost £6.1 billion.

== Fraud in the Public Sector ==
The NFA's 'Fraud in the Public Sector action plan' placed a firm emphasis on enhanced measures to prevent fraud in central and local government. This consisted of 15 workstreams.

== See also ==
- Serious Fraud Office
- Serious Organised Crime Agency
