= Fraud =

Intentional deception to gain unlawfully

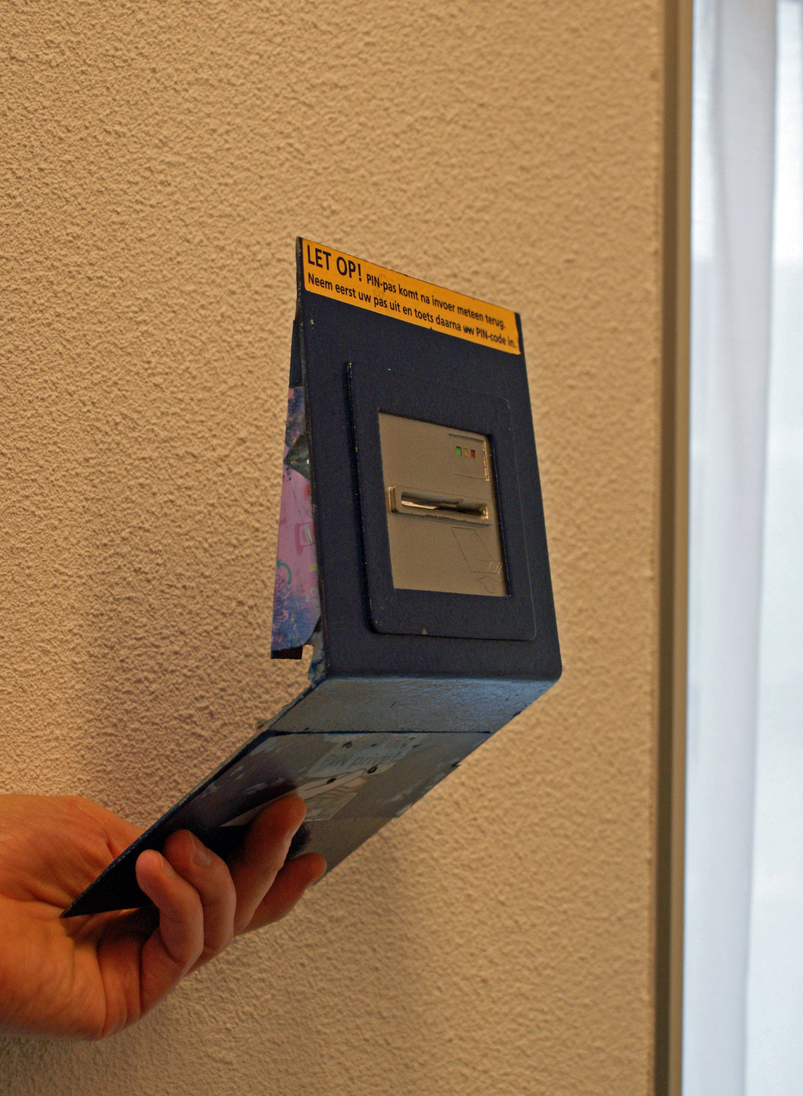
A fake automated teller slot used to commit bank fraud upon bank patrons

In law, fraud is intentional deception to deprive a victim of a legal right or to gain from a victim unlawfully or unfairly. Fraud can violate civil law (e.g., a fraud victim may sue the fraud perpetrator to thwart the fraud or recover monetary compensation) or criminal law (e.g., a fraud perpetrator may be prosecuted and imprisoned by governmental authorities), or it may be an element of another civil or criminal wrong despite itself causing no loss of money, property, or legal right. The purpose of fraud may be monetary gain or other benefits, such as obtaining a passport, travel document, or driver's licence.

== Terminology ==
Fraud can be defined as either a civil wrong or a criminal act. For civil fraud, a government agency or person or entity harmed by fraud may bring litigation to stop the fraud, seek monetary damages, or both. For criminal fraud, a person may be prosecuted for the fraud and potentially face fines, incarceration, or both.

=== Civil law ===
In common law jurisdictions, as a civil wrong, fraud is considered a tort. While the precise definitions and requirements of proof vary among jurisdictions, the requisite elements of fraud as a tort generally are the intentional misrepresentation or concealment of an important fact upon which the victim is meant to rely, and in fact does rely, to the detriment of the victim. Proving fraud in a court of law is often said to be difficult as the intention to defraud is the key element in question. As such, proving fraud comes with a "greater evidentiary burden than other civil claims". This difficulty is exacerbated by the fact that some jurisdictions require the victim to prove fraud by clear and convincing evidence.

In cases of a fraudulently induced contract, fraud may serve as a legal defence in a civil action for breach of contract or specific performance of a contract. Similarly, fraud may serve as a basis for a court to invoke its equitable jurisdiction. The remedies for fraud may include rescission (i.e., reversal) of a fraudulently obtained agreement or transaction, the recovery of a monetary award to compensate for the harm caused, punitive damages to punish or deter the misconduct, and possibly others.

=== Criminal law ===
In common law jurisdictions, as a criminal offence, fraud takes many different forms, some general (e.g., theft by false pretense) and some specific to particular categories of victims or misconduct (e.g., bank fraud, insurance fraud, forgery). The elements of fraud as a crime similarly vary. The requisite elements of perhaps the most general form of criminal fraud, theft by false pretense, are the intentional deception of a victim by false representation or pretense with the intent of persuading the victim to part with property and with the victim parting with property in reliance on the representation or pretense and with the perpetrator intending to keep the property from the victim.

== Types of fraud ==
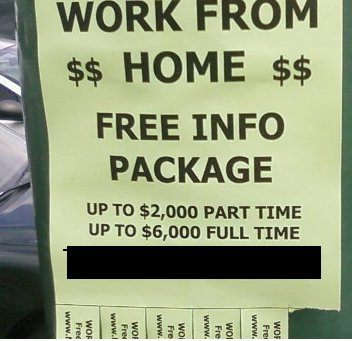
An advertisement for a possibly fraudulent "work-at-home scheme"

The falsification of documents, known as forgery, and counterfeiting are types of fraud involved in physical duplication or fabrication. The "theft" of one's personal information or identity, like finding another's social security number and then using it as identification, is a type of fraud. Fraud can be committed through and across many media including In cases of mortgage fraud, the perpetrator attempts to qualify for a mortgage by way of false statements. Additional types of fraud include health care fraud, disability fraud, welfare fraud, electoral fraud, employment fraud, visa fraud, insurance fraud, mail and wire fraud, phone fraud, and internet fraud.

Given the international nature of the web and the ease with which users can hide their location, obstacles to checking identity and legitimacy online, and the variety of hacker techniques available to gain access to PII have all contributed to the very rapid growth of Internet fraud. In some countries, tax fraud is also prosecuted under false billing or tax forgery. There have also been fraudulent science, where the appetite is for prestige rather than immediate monetary gain. A hoax is a distinct concept that involves deliberate deception without the intention of gain or of materially damaging or depriving a victim.

=== Internal fraud ===
Internal fraud, also known as "insider fraud", is fraud committed or attempted by someone within an organization such as an employee.

=== Commodities fraud ===
The illegal act of obtaining (or the attempt to obtain) a certain amount of currency in accordance with a contract that promises the later exchange of equated assets, which ultimately never arrive, is a type of fraud, known as commodities fraud. Alternatively, the term can relate to the failure of registering in an exchange, the act of deliberately providing falsified information to clients, the action of executing transactions with the sole purpose of making a profit for the payee, and the theft of client funds.

== Detection ==
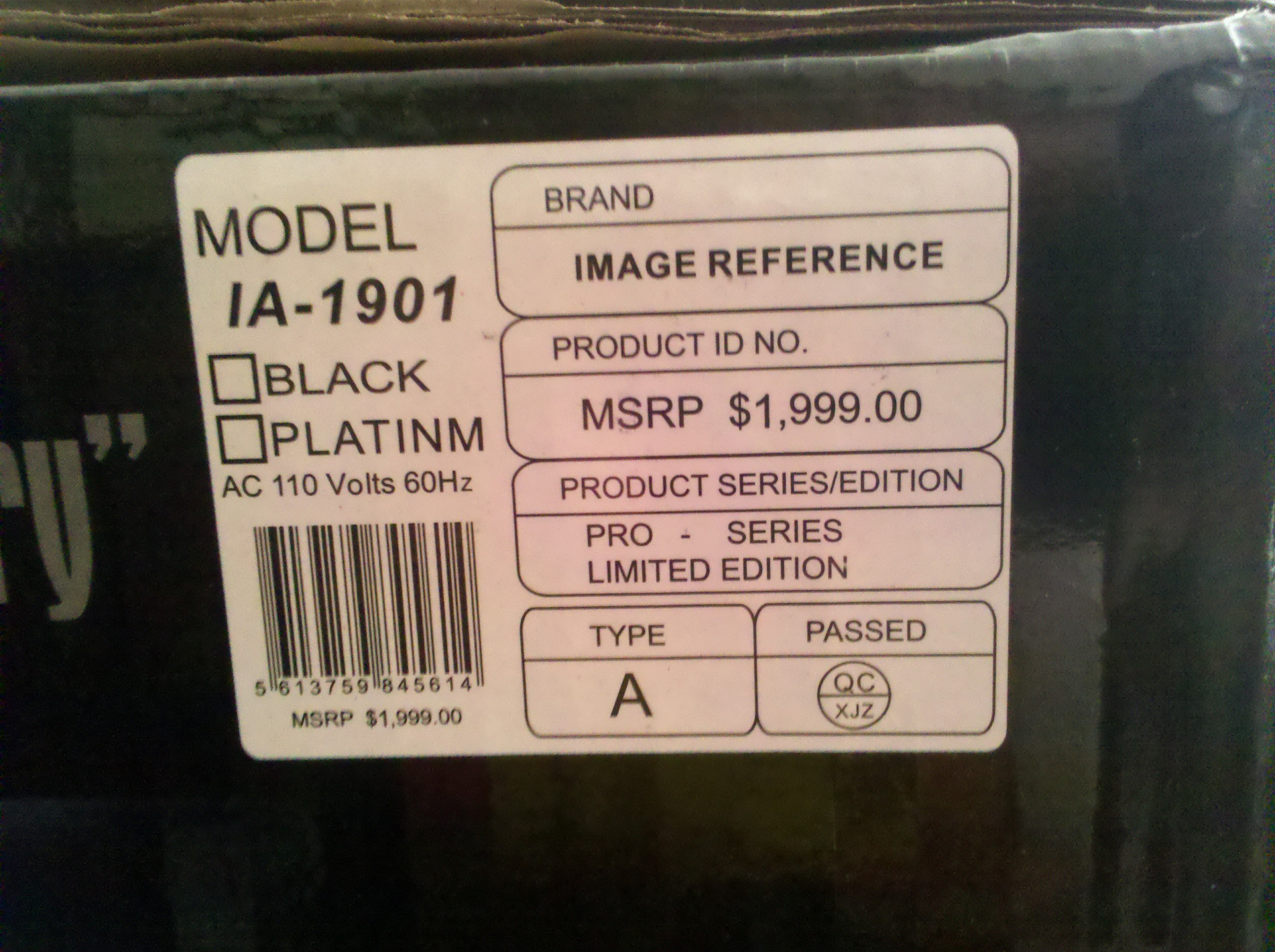
A fraudulent manufacturer's suggested retail price on a speaker

The detection of fraudulent activities on a large scale is possible with the harvesting of massive amounts of financial data paired with predictive analytics or forensic analytics, the use of electronic data to reconstruct or detect financial fraud. Using computer-based analytic methods in particular allows for the surfacing of errors, anomalies, inefficiencies, irregularities, and biases which often refer to fraudsters gravitating to certain dollar amounts to get past internal control thresholds. These high-level tests include tests related to Benford's Law and possibly also those statistics known as descriptive statistics. High-level tests are always followed by more focused tests to look for small samples of highly irregular transactions. The familiar methods of correlation and time-series analysis can also be used to detect fraud and other irregularities.

== Cost ==
Participants of a 2010 survey by the Association of Certified Fraud Examiners estimated that the typical organization loses five per cent of its annual revenue to fraud, with a median loss of $160,000. Fraud committed by owners and executives was more than nine times as costly as employee fraud. The industries most commonly affected are banking, manufacturing, and government.

== By region ==
=== Asia ===
==== China ====
In China, according to the Criminal Law of the People's Republic of China, the Crime of Fraud (诈骗罪) refers to the "criminal act of deceiving and obtaining public or private property". According to Article 266 of the Criminal Law:

1. Those who commit fraud involving a "relatively large amount" of public or private property shall be sentenced to fixed-term imprisonment of not more than three years, criminal detention, or injunction control with community correction, and may additionally or solely be fined.
2. If the amount involved is "large" or there are other serious circumstances, the offender shall be sentenced to fixed-term imprisonment of not less than three years but not more than ten years and shall also be fined.
3. If the amount involved is "particularly large" or there are other particularly serious circumstances, the offender shall be sentenced to fixed-term imprisonment of over ten years or life imprisonment and shall also be fined or have their property confiscated.

According to the "Interpretation on Several Issues Concerning the Specific Application of the Law in Handling Criminal Cases of Fraud" issued by the Supreme People's Court and the Supreme People's Procuratorate in 2011, for cases of fraud involving public or private property with a value ranging from 3,000 yuan to 30,000 yuan, from 30,000 yuan to 500,000 yuan, and over 500,000 yuan, they should be respectively deemed as "relatively large amount", "large amount", and "particularly large amount" as stipulated in Article 266 of the Criminal Law.

==== India ====
In India, the criminal laws are enshrined in the Indian Penal Code, supplemented by the Criminal Procedure Code and Indian Evidence Act.

==== Philippines ====
In the Philippines, fraud is called "estafa", derived from the Spanish word "estafar", meaning "to swindle or defraud", and is defined in the Revised Penal Code. The penalties, which include imprisonment from six months to twenty years, depending on the value that was swindled, and may include restitution.

=== Europe ===
==== United Kingdom ====
Since 2007, fraud in England and Wales and Northern Ireland has been covered by the Fraud Act 2006. The Act gives a statutory definition of the criminal offence of fraud, defining it in three classes: fraud by false representation, failure to disclose information, and by abuse of position. It provides that a person found guilty of fraud is liable to a fine or imprisonment for up to six months on summary conviction, or a fine or imprisonment for up to ten years on conviction on indictment. This Act largely replaces the laws relating to obtaining property by deception, obtaining a pecuniary advantage and other offences that were created under the Theft Act 1978.

As of 2025, the UK has a number of government agencies and services for the detection, prevention and management of fraud, working with a variety of private and public sector bodies to share information and formulate policy. These include the primary enforcement authorities: the National Crime Agency, HM Revenue and Customs, the Financial Conduct Authority, the Serious Fraud Office and the Crown Prosecution Service, together with agencies such as the UK Financial Intelligence Unit, City of London Police, the National Fraud Intelligence Bureau, and the National Cyber Crime Unit. The National Economic Crime Centre exists to coordinate the UK’s response to economic crime overall.

The National Fraud Intelligence Bureau (NFIB) is the police unit in the United Kingdom responsible for gathering and analysing reports of fraud and financially motivated cyber crime reported by the public. It passes intelligence to police forces and other law enforcement bodies as part of the UK's multi-agency structure, in accordance with the government's overall strategy for combatting fraud. The NFIB is managed by the City of London Police as part of its role as the National Lead Force for fraud, funded by the Home Office.

Central to the NFIB's operations is their operation of the public-facing Report Fraud service. This replaced their widely-criticised service named 'Action Fraud' in 2025.

===== Statistics =====
Fraud is the most common crime experienced in the UK. While it is estimated that only one in eight incidents are reported to police, fraud consistently accounts for around 40% of all crimes reported by victims in the Crime Survey for England and Wales (CSEW). In 2022, the majority of online fraud in the United Kingdom was found to be perpetrated by industrial-scale scamming call centres in Asia.

In 2023, the UK's National Strategy marked a fundamental shift in how the government intended to respond to fraud against individuals. The strategy directs a multi-agency approach to fraud, but has been criticised as being poorly formulated to address the characteristics and nature of the crime itself, while the UK's police inspectorate HMIRCS has expressed concerns over the rise in fraud cases, variations in police responses and priorities, poor service to victims, and the need for a focus on prevention.

In 2025, out of the estimated 4.1 million incidents of fraud (a 14% increase compared with 2024), around 3 million incidents involved a loss. Victims said that they were fully reimbursed in 2.2 million of these cases. Bank and credit account fraud is the most prevalant, followed by consumer and retail, advanced fee, and other fraud types. These latter types formed most of the increase in 2024-25.

Total estimates of losses from all types of fraud vary considerably. In July 2016, the National Crime Agency stated a figure for annual losses at more than £190 billion, with the anti-fraud charity Fraud Advisory Panel setting business fraud at £144 billon and individuals losing approximately £9.7 billion. A figure of £2.11 billion was cited by the Financial Times in 2017, and the government's National Strategy set estimated losses of at least £6.8 billion for the year ending March 2020. In 2021 the House of Commons Library claimed that fraud could cost the UK over £137 billion a year.

In addition to directly reported losses in 2020, using the Quality Adjusted Life Years approach (a measure used to quantify the emotional impacts of anxiety, depression, and fear), costs associated with prevention, loss of productivity by victims, health treatments, and criminal justice processes set the biggest single loss at £1.3 billion while police costs in response to crime were assessed at £0.2 billion.

Figures for losses per crime also show variations. In 2020, 26% of cases reported in the Crime Survey for England and Wales involved no loss. Of those that did, 76% involved losses of less than £500 with a median loss of £150. The average loss for the 875,000 cases sent to the National Fraud Intelligence Bureau for potential dissemination to police forces was just over £2,600, with an average loss £7,500 for reports to Action Fraud.

2022, in the two thirds of incidents for which victims suffered a financial loss, over three quarters (77%) incurred a loss of less than £250, with the median loss being £79; around 14% incurred a loss of between £250 and £999 and the remaining 9% incurred a loss of £1,000 or more. Data from fraud using Authorised Push Payment (APP) in 2023 showed that 4.6% of incidents relating to individuals involve amounts over £10,000 and 70% lost less than £1,000. The losses for the 4.6% represented over 13% of the payment transactions and over 60% of total losses.

Of the fraud offences recorded by the police in 2024, only 2% of were referred to territorial forces for investigation, although the number of fraud offences referred increased by 37% while positive outcomes declined 15%.

From 2024, the latest figures for police-reported fraud are published online by the City of London Police's Report Fraud Analysis Services.

===== Scotland =====
In Scots law, fraud is covered under the common law and a number of statutory offences. The main fraud offences are common law fraud, uttering, embezzlement, and statutory fraud. The Fraud Act 2006 does not apply in Scotland.

=== North America ===
==== Canada ====
Section 380(1) of the Criminal Code provides the general definition of fraud in Canada:

380. (1) Every one who, by deceit, falsehood or other fraudulent means, whether or not it is a false pretence within the meaning of this Act, defrauds the public or any person, whether ascertained or not, of any property, money or valuable security or any service,

(a) is guilty of an indictable offence and liable to a term of imprisonment not exceeding fourteen years, where the subject-matter of the offence is a testamentary instrument or the value of the subject-matter of the offence exceeds five thousand dollars; or
(b) is guilty

(i) of an indictable offence and is liable to imprisonment for a term not exceeding two years, or
(ii) of an offence punishable on summary conviction, where the value of the subject-matter of the offence does not exceed five thousand dollars.

In addition to the penalties outlined above, the court can also issue a prohibition order under s. 380.2 (preventing a person from "seeking, obtaining or continuing any employment, or becoming or being a volunteer in any capacity, that involves having authority over the real property, money or valuable security of another person"). It can also make a restitution order under s. 380.3. The Canadian courts have held that the offence consists of two distinct elements:

- A prohibited act of deceit, falsehood or other fraudulent means. In the absence of deceit or falsehood, the courts will look objectively for a "dishonest act"; and
- The deprivation must be caused by the prohibited act, and deprivation must relate to property, money, valuable security, or any service.

The Supreme Court of Canada has held that deprivation is satisfied on proof of detriment, prejudice or risk of prejudice; there does not have to be actual loss. Deprivation of confidential information, in the nature of a trade secret or copyrighted material that has commercial value, has also been held to fall within the scope of the offence.

==== United States ====
===== Criminal fraud =====
The proof requirements for criminal fraud charges in the United States are essentially the same as the requirements for other crimes: guilt must be proved beyond a reasonable doubt. Throughout the United States fraud charges can be misdemeanours or felonies depending on the amount of loss involved. High-value fraud can also trigger additional penalties. For example, in California, losses of $500,000 or more will result in an extra two, three, or five years in prison in addition to the regular penalty for the fraud. The U.S. government's 2006 fraud review concluded that fraud is a significantly under-reported crime, and while various agencies and organizations were attempting to tackle the issue, greater cooperation was needed to achieve a real impact in the public sector. The scale of the problem pointed to the need for a small but high-powered body to bring together the numerous counter-fraud initiatives that existed.

===== Civil fraud =====
Although elements may vary by jurisdiction and the specific allegations made by a plaintiff who files a lawsuit that alleged fraud, typical elements of a fraud case are that:

1. Somebody misrepresents a material fact in order to obtain action or forbearance by another person
2. The other person relies upon the misrepresentation
3. The other person suffers injury as a result of the act or forbearance taken in reliance upon the misrepresentation.

To establish a civil claim of fraud, most jurisdictions in the United States require that each element of a fraud claim be pleaded with particularity and be proved by a preponderance of the evidence, meaning that it is more likely than not that the fraud occurred. Some jurisdictions impose a higher evidentiary standard, such as Washington State's requirement that the elements of fraud be proved with clear, cogent, and convincing evidence (very probable evidence), or Pennsylvania's requirement that common law fraud be proved by clear and convincing evidence.

The measure of damages in fraud cases is normally computed using one of two rules:

- The "benefit of bargain" rule, which allows for recovery of damages in the amount of the difference between the value of the property had it been as represented and its actual value;
- Out-of-pocket loss, which allows for the recovery of damages in the amount of the difference between the value of what was given and the value of what was received.

Special damages may be allowed if shown to have been proximately caused by the defendant's fraud and the damage amounts are proved with specificity. Some jurisdictions may permit a plaintiff in a fraud case to seek punitive or exemplary damages.

===== Anti-fraud provisioning =====
In response to securities fraud in the United States, Franklin D. Roosevelt established the Securities and Exchange Commission.

Beyond legislation directed at preventing or punishing fraud, some governmental and non-governmental organizations engage in anti-fraud efforts. Between 1911 and 1933, 47 states adopted the so-called Blue Sky Laws status. These laws were enacted and enforced at the state level and regulated the offering and sale of securities to protect the public from fraud. Though the specific provisions of these laws varied among states, they all required the registration of all securities offerings and sales, as well as of every U.S. stockbroker and brokerage firm; however, these Blue Sky laws were generally found to be ineffective. To increase public trust in the capital markets, Franklin D. Roosevelt established the U.S. Securities and Exchange Commission (SEC). The main reason for the creation of the SEC was to regulate the stock market and prevent corporate abuses relating to the offering and sale of securities and corporate reporting. The SEC was given the power to license and regulate stock exchanges, the companies whose securities traded on them, and the brokers and dealers who conducted the trading.

=== Statistics ===
Rate of fraud per capita for individual countries as reported by United Nations Office on Drugs and Crime is shown below for the last available year. Definitions of fraud and fraction of unreported fraud might differ for each country.

| Country | Reported annual frauds per 100,000 | Year |
|---|---|---|
| Albania | 28.7 | 2024 |
| Algeria | 3.0 | 2022 |
| Antigua and Barbuda | 66.1 | 2024 |
| Armenia | 91.3 | 2024 |
| Australia | 32.4 | 2024 |
| Austria | 876.1 | 2024 |
| Azerbaijan | 67.4 | 2024 |
| Bahamas | 136.6 | 2022 |
| Barbados | 42.2 | 2022 |
| Belgium | 1048.9 | 2024 |
| Belize | 0.0 | 2020 |
| Bermuda | 137.1 | 2016 |
| Bolivia | 0.0 | 2022 |
| Bosnia and Herzegovina | 14.0 | 2024 |
| Botswana | 8.0 | 2020 |
| Brazil | 728.7 | 2024 |
| Bulgaria | 40.7 | 2024 |
| Canada | 517.0 | 2024 |
| Chile | 375.6 | 2022 |
| Colombia | 301.8 | 2024 |
| Costa Rica | 376.3 | 2024 |
| Croatia | 120.9 | 2024 |
| Cyprus | 34.7 | 2024 |
| Czech Republic | 167.5 | 2024 |
| Denmark | 1030.4 | 2024 |
| Dominica | 49.8 | 2024 |
| Dominican Republic | 36.8 | 2020 |
| Ecuador | 198.5 | 2024 |
| El Salvador | 101.4 | 2022 |
| England and Wales | 1619.5 | 2021 |
| Estonia | 272.4 | 2024 |
| Finland | 1263.6 | 2024 |
| France | 520.7 | 2024 |
| Germany | 882.8 | 2024 |
| Greece | 90.0 | 2024 |
| Grenada | 55.6 | 2022 |
| Guatemala | 0.7 | 2024 |
| Guyana | 1.7 | 2024 |
| Honduras | 3.6 | 2024 |
| Hungary | 431.5 | 2024 |
| Iceland | 121.5 | 2024 |
| Indonesia | 9.8 | 2024 |
| Ireland | 219.0 | 2024 |
| Israel | 214.6 | 2024 |
| Italy | 728.1 | 2024 |
| Japan | 46.3 | 2024 |
| Jordan | 32.3 | 2024 |
| Kenya | 0.9 | 2022 |
| Kosovo | 26.7 | 2020 |
| Kyrgyzstan | 266.4 | 2020 |
| Latvia | 152.7 | 2024 |
| Lebanon | 3.0 | 2015 |
| Liechtenstein | 534.2 | 2024 |
| Lithuania | 171.9 | 2024 |
| Luxembourg | 717.7 | 2022 |
| Macau | 388.7 | 2024 |
| Malta | 434.9 | 2024 |
| Mexico | 98.4 | 2024 |
| Moldova | 98.3 | 2024 |
| Monaco | 1550.6 | 2016 |
| Mongolia | 457.2 | 2024 |
| Montenegro | 25.2 | 2024 |
| Morocco | 28.8 | 2022 |
| Myanmar | 3.8 | 2022 |
| Netherlands | 366.2 | 2016 |
| New Zealand | 58.7 | 2020 |
| North Macedonia | 13.9 | 2024 |
| Norway | 528.7 | 2024 |
| Oman | 35.3 | 2022 |
| Palestine | 25.5 | 2024 |
| Panama | 112.1 | 2024 |
| Paraguay | 197.6 | 2024 |
| Peru | 76.7 | 2022 |
| Poland | 447.6 | 2024 |
| Portugal | 436.3 | 2024 |
| Puerto Rico | 10.5 | 2017 |
| Romania | 76.7 | 2024 |
| Russia | 224.8 | 2020 |
| Saint Kitts and Nevis | 76.9 | 2024 |
| Saint Lucia | 311.6 | 2022 |
| Scotland | 302.8 | 2023 |
| Senegal | 0.1 | 2016 |
| Serbia | 39.3 | 2024 |
| Singapore | 955.7 | 2024 |
| Slovakia | 26.3 | 2024 |
| Slovenia | 289.0 | 2024 |
| Spain | 1079.7 | 2024 |
| Sri Lanka | 27.4 | 2018 |
| St. Vincent and Grenadines | 1.0 | 2024 |
| Sweden | 2758.7 | 2024 |
| Switzerland | 414.1 | 2024 |
| Syria | 3.6 | 2018 |
| Thailand | 49.6 | 2024 |
| Trinidad and Tobago | 34.0 | 2020 |
| Turkey | 109.8 | 2014 |
| Ukraine | 57.5 | 2020 |
| United Arab Emirates | 45.2 | 2016 |
| United States of America | 269.5 | 2022 |
| Uruguay | 941.7 | 2024 |
| Vatican City | 1816.3 | 2024 |

== See also ==
- Accreditation mill
- Bait-and-switch
- Cramming (fraud)
- Creative accounting
- Deception
- Diploma mill
- Embezzlement
- Financial crimes
- Forgery
- Fortune telling fraud
- Fraud deterrence
- Fraud in the factum
- Fraud in parapsychology
- Fraud Squad (UK)
- Friendly fraud
- Great Stock Exchange Fraud of 1814
- Guinness share-trading fraud, famous British business scandal of the 1980s
- High-trust and low-trust societies
- Hoax
- Identity management
- Impersonator
- Journalism fraud
- Misappropriation
- Money laundering
- The National Council Against Health Fraud
- Push payment fraud
- Quackery
- Scam
- Secret profits
- Shell company
- White-collar crime
