= Race and crime in the United Kingdom =

The relationship between race and crime in the United Kingdom is the subject of academic studies, government surveys, media coverage, and public concern since at least the Second World War.

Data gathered from a variety of sources consistently shows that ethnic minorities in the UK have been, and are currently, over-represented across the criminal justice system compared to the white population.

The long-term trend in the prevalence of hate crime incidents (about half of which are race hate crime) has seen a decline since the relevant data collection began in 1988, despite spikes around specific events. However, the number of hate crimes recorded by the police has risen steeply since 2014, primarily because of changes in recording practices and increased reporting.

A rise in terrorist offences by ethnic minorities has been accompanied by corresponding increases in white supremacist terrorism, along with an increase in people trafficking and related crimes fuelled by geopolitical events.

The extent to which race is correlated with crime, particularly in the case of violent crime, is complicated by confounding factors such as economic and social deprivation, police counting rules, and issues such as age and cultural histories.

== Racially motivated and racially aggravated crimes ==
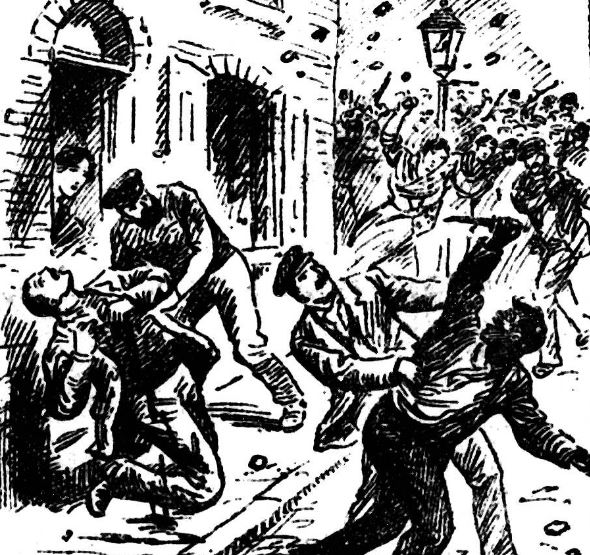
‘Stabbed to the Heart’ – a depiction of the 1919 Cardiff race riots

From the antisemitic portrayal of Shylock as a userous Jew by William Shakespeare in the 1600s, through the race riots of 1919, to racial segregation and acts of Parliament, and in common with other European countries, race and racism has been part of both the social and legislative history of the United Kingdom.

In UK law, some crimes are defined as "racially motivated" if hostility on the basis of race is part of the motive. Since the Crime and Disorder Act 1998, some offences are defined as "racially aggravated" if the offender shows hostility based on race, colour, nationality, or ethnic origins during the incident. In such cases, the judge or magistrates are required by law to state that the offence was aggravated by race and impose a longer or more severe penalty than would have been given for the "basic" crime (e.g., harassment or public order) alone.

High-profile racially-motivated crimes in modern times include the murders of Stephen Lawrence in 1993 and Kriss Donald in 2004. Examples of crimes with an unproven or suspected racial motivation are the New Cross house fire in 1981, and the deaths of Ricky Reel in 1997 and Traiq Javed in 2000.

Additionally, stirring up racial hatred is proscribed under the Public Order Act 1986 and the Racial and Religious Hatred Act 2006. For example, Lucy Connolly was convicted of this offence for her role in the 2024 United Kingdom riots.

Various other publicised crimes have been related to race or racism, such as the police killing of anti-racst protestor Blair Peach in 1979, the case of Satpal Ram in 1986, the murder of the British MP Jo Cox by a far right activist in 2016, and the 'grooming gangs' scandal which has resulted in controversy about ethnicity and criminal behaviour.

== Culture and the media ==
Young men, particularly young black men, are commonly stereotyped as engaging in criminal behaviour. For example, concerns over mugging in the 1970s were focused on young African-Caribbean men, and notwithstanding the findings of the Scarman Report into the inner city riots of the 1980s, which found that "complex political, social and economic factors" created a "disposition towards violent protest", the behaviour at the time was largely blamed on young black people. A content analysis of mainstream news in 2008 found that just over four in 10 stories for all young men and boys were crime-related, but almost seven in 10 stories about black young men and boys related in some form to crime. Sensationalist reporting and political rhetoric relating to some events have also lead to 'spikes' in hate crime.

In December 2009 Rod Liddle in The Spectator referred to two black rappers, Brandon Jolie and Kingsley Ogundele, who had plotted to kill Jolie's 15-year-old pregnant girlfriend, as "human filth" and said the incident was not an anomaly. Liddle continued:

The overwhelming majority of street crime, knife crime, gun crime, robbery and crimes of sexual violence in London is carried out by young men from the African-Caribbean community. Of course, in return, we have rap music, goat curry and a far more vibrant and diverse understanding of cultures which were once alien to us. For which, many thanks.

Liddle was accused of racism after his comments, to which he replied that his comments were not racism but a discussion of multiculturalism. In March 2010, the Press Complaints Commission upheld a complaint against Liddle, since "the magazine had not been able to demonstrate that the 'overwhelming majority' of crime in all of the stated categories had been carried out by members of the African-Caribbean community". After the publication of the crime figures in June 2010, The Sunday Telegraph claimed that Liddle was "largely right on some of his claims", but "that he was probably wrong on his claims about knife crimes and violent sex crimes".

Since 2011, there has been widespread media, public and policy debate in the UK around so-called ‘grooming’, depicted as a new crime threat associated with ‘Asian sex gangs’ who deliberately seek out white British girls for repeated sexual abuse. In particular, men of Pakistani heritage were linked to on-street grooming activities, but white men were linked to online cases. Commenting on the disparity in the reaction to information about the race of perpetrators, Sadie Robinson of the Socialist Worker wrote:

Sexual abuse and sexist attitudes aren’t the preserve of Asian men. The press described the abusers in Newcastle as an “Asian sex gang,” “Asian sex ring” and “Asian grooming gang”. The usual calls for Asian people to stamp out abuse—with the implication that they are otherwise responsible for it—followed. In April three white brothers, one white woman and an Asian man were jailed for child sex offences including rape. None of the press described the Sheffield abusers as a “Mostly White Rape Gang”. White people were not called upon to root out abuse in their “communities”. Comment pieces explaining why white people are particularly sexist did not follow.

British police forces, and especially the Metropolitan Police, have been accused of institutional racism on a number of occasions. One example often cited is the Mangrove Nine, a group eventually acquitted in 1970. In 1995, the London Metropolitan Police commissioner Paul Condon stated that the majority of robberies in London were committed by black people. Operation Trident was set up in March 1998 by the Metropolitan Police to investigate gun crime in London's black community after black-on-black shootings in Lambeth and Brent.

== Demographics ==
=== England and Wales ===
A 2024 report by the Ministry of Justice (MOJ) found that ethnic minorities were over-represented across the criminal justice system compared to the white population. The greatest disparity existed for the black population, particularly black children in the criminal justice system. The black population makes up 4% of the population in England and Wales, but represented 18% of stops and searches; 13% of custodial remands; 12% of the prison population; 10% of prosecutions, convictions and custodial sentences; and 9% of arrests. While members of minority ethnic groups are more likely to be arrested, white people had the highest conviction ratio in 2021.

Stop and search (2022/23)
Ethnicity	Rate per 1,000 people
Black	24.5
Pakistani	10.3
Mixed	9.9
All groups	8.9(average)
Bangladeshi	8.9
White	5.9
Indian	3.1
Arabs	3
Chinese	1.1

Arrests (2022/23)
Ethnicity	Rate per 1,000 people
Black	20.4
Mixed	12.5
Pakistani	11.3
All groups	11.2(average)
White	9.4
Bangladeshi	8.7
Arabs	4.8
Indian	4.5
Chinese	2.8

=== Scotland and Northern Ireland ===
Police-recorded crime statistics in Scotland cannot be directly compared to those of England and Wales or Northern Ireland, due to the different way Scottish counting rules operate.

In 2021/22, the vast majority of stop and searches were conducted on people identifying as White Scottish/White Other British. The proportion of stop and searches being carried out on minority ethnic individuals remained fairly stable over the five years prior to that. 94.9% of the average daily prison population in Scotland self-identified as white, while it was estimated that the incarceration rate for people who identify as African, Caribbean or black, or from other ethnic groups, was significantly higher.

In 2022, 21% of those from black or minority ethnic groups in Scotland reported experiencing discrimination, compared to 8% of those from a white ethnic group.

While anti-social behaviour incidents have shown a downward trend since 2006/07, for the period ending March 2025, Northern Ireland recorded the highest recorded since the data series began in 2004/05. The figures include the impact of racist riots in Belfast in August 2024 and a wave of violent attacks on migrant families in June 2025, a rise of 48.5% from the previous year.

== Street crime and policing ==
=== Stop and search ===
==== Legislation ====
Both Section 1 of the Police and Criminal Evidence Act 1984 and Section 60 of the Criminal Justice and Public Order Act 1994 give police the power to 'stop and search'. Section 1 gives permission for searches where any officer has reasonable grounds for suspecting that they will find stolen or prohibited articles. Section 60 applies to weapons or dangerous instruments only. Section 60 powers must be authorised by a senior officer (Inspector or above), and allow officers to search anyone within a designated area and for a limited time, even if they show no suspicious behaviour.

Section 43 of the Terrorism Act 2000 is the suspicion-based stop and search power for general counter-terrorism policing, equivalent to that of Section 1 in which any officer can stop and search a person or their vehicle on suspicion of terrorism.

Schedule 7 allows a police, immigration or customs official to stop, search and detain a person passing through a UK border (for example, at an airport or port) for up to 6 hours in order to determine whether they are a terrorist. The use of Schedule 7 powers requires neither ‘reasonable grounds for suspicion’ nor prior authorisation by a senior officer to conduct searches of a person’s property or vehicle, take fingerprints, photographs, and DNA samples as well as request passwords for electronic devices. It does not allow 'intimate' (strip) searches without authorisation.

Under the Criminal Justice Act 1991, section 95, the government collects annual statistics based on race and crime.

==== Statistics ====
For the year 2016/2017, stop and search was 8.4 times as likely to occur for a black person in England and Wales compared to a white person. Similarly, the rate of stop and searches in mixed ethnicity and Asian people was more than twice as likely, when compared with that of a person with a white ethnicity. Between 2019 and 2020, black people were nine times more likely to be stopped and searched compared to a white person.

Between April 2019 and March 2020, the use of stop and search powers under Section 60 (for weapons or dangerous instruments) occurred 11,408 times, which was an increase of 19% from the year prior.

===== London =====
As of 2024, 46% of Londoners are of an ethnic minority, (Note: "Ethnic miorities" cover all groups except White British. This includes white minority groups such as Gypsy, Roma and Irish Traveller, and in some cases characteristics of religion. For example, Jewish people and Sikhs are also classed as ethnic groups under the Equality Act 2010.) compared to 14% in the rest of England, while 13.5% of the population of London is black.

The connections between race and crime in the city have been the subject of multiple studies. A Home Office report in 2003 found that 70% of mugging victims on commuter railways around London identified their muggers as black. The study also reported that 87% of victims in Lambeth, South London, told the police that their attackers were black. 38% of acid attack suspects in London were of African Caribbean background in 2017, and 25% of the victims. In 2020, an estimated 70% of London's brothels were controlled by Albanians. Evidence shows that the black population in London boroughs increases with the level of deprivation, and that the level of crime increases it, such that ethnicity, deprivation, victimisation and offending are inter-related.

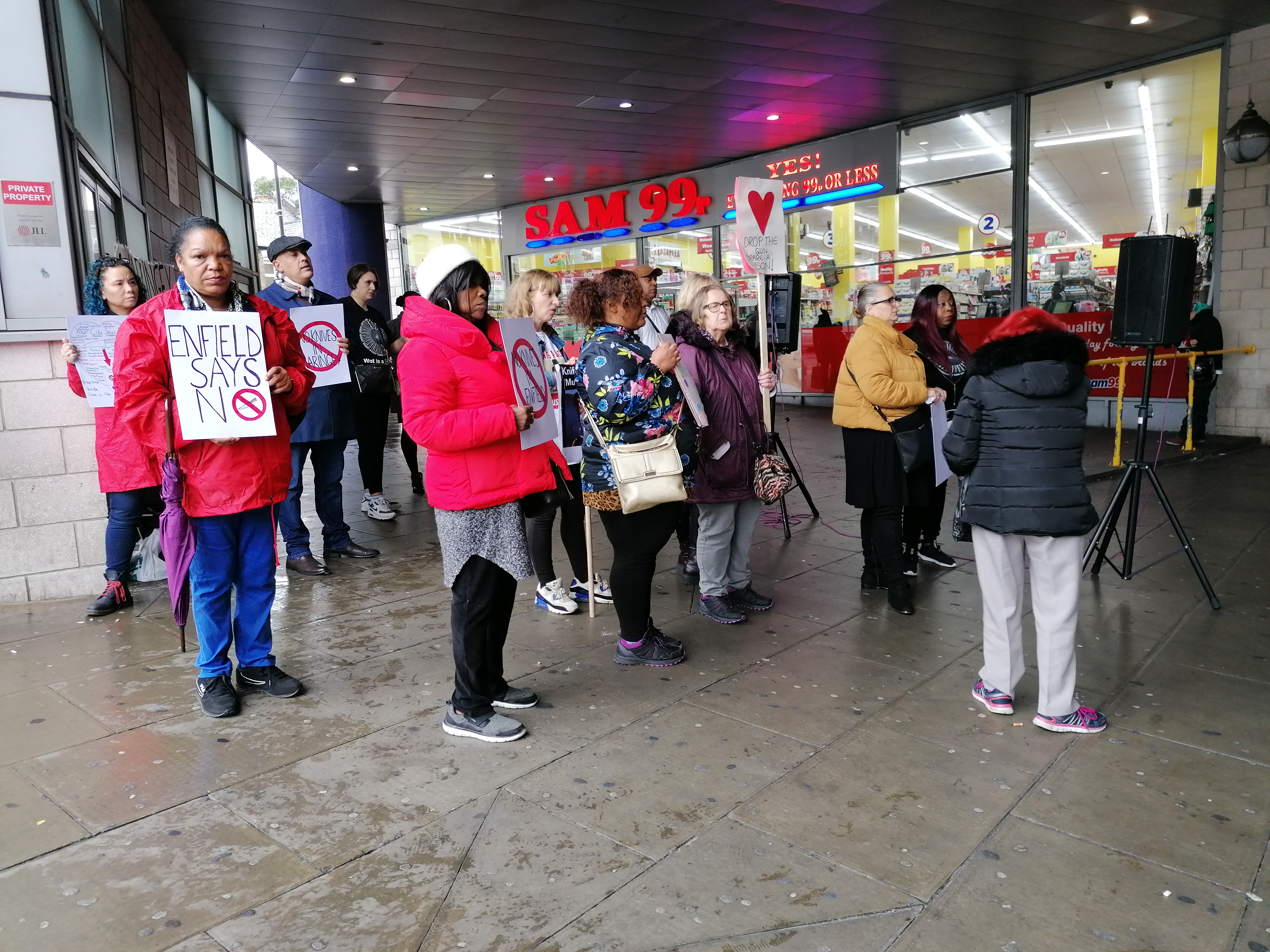
An anti-knife crime demonstration in Wood Green, north London, October 2019

In 2020, figures from the London Mayor's office showed black Londoners were almost four times more likely to be stopped and searched, and six times more likely to be stopped in a car, than white Londoners. Subsequently, London Mayor Sadiq Khan published an action plan to address the police force's disproportionate use of these and other powers, such as the use of tasers, against black people on the city. In response, Metropolitan Police Commissioner Cressida Dick said the force was "not free of discrimination, racism or bias", and committed to rebuilding trust with black communities. In 2022, Deputy Assistant Commissioner Bas Javid also said the Metropolitan Police had a problem with racism.

Figures from 2017 showed the most common reason for a search was suspected drugs possession. Asians were most commonly stopped in relation to drugs (66%), and then blacks (62%). Whites were subjected to a notable lower level of drug searches (50%). Despite this, whites had the lowest rate of NFA (no further action). For Asians, 60% of individuals were no further actioned and 28% were arrested. For blacks, roughly 61% of individuals were no further actioned and 20% were arrested. For whites, only 53% were no further actioned while the arrest rate was 27%. Overall, blacks had the lowest arrest rate and the highest no further action rate, despite being subjected to twice as many searches as whites. When stopped, whites were the most likely to be found in breach of drug laws, having the lowest corresponding no further action rate.

Crimes in London by racial groups of the accused (2022)

- White
- Black
- Asian
- Other
- Unknown

== Hate crime ==
The Office for National Statistics (ONS) cautions that due to changes and improvements in the way police have recorded hate crime since 2014, increases in police reported figures are not a reliable indicator of actual trends. The Crime Survey for England and Wales (CSEW), which is not affected by changes in crime recording, shows a long-term decline in victim-reported figures: a 38% fall in between the combined years ending March 2008 and 2020. The police and other agencies in the criminal justice system agreed a common definition of hate crime in 2007, which included racially-motivated crime.

However, police recorded hate crime of all categories has shown an increase over time, especially around certain events in recent history. These include the EU Referendum in June 2016, the 2017 Westminster attacks, the widespread Black Lives Matter protests and far-right counter-protests. At the start of the coronavirus pandemic, hate crimes directed at both South and East Asian communities significantly increased.

In the year ending March 2024, offences motivated by race accounted for 70% (98,799) of all hate crimes, (Note: Due to a change in the Metropolitan Police Service crime recording system, London's data for the year ending March 2025 is not comparable with data supplied in previous years and was excluded from the trend analysis.) down 5% from the previous year (103,625). While crimes motivated by race declined on the whole, religiously motivated hate crimes increased 25%, driven largely by an increase in antisemitic hate crimes and a smaller increase in Islamophobic hate crimes following the onset of the Gaza war. Black people were victims of racially aggravated offences at the rate of 41 per 10,000 population, Asian people at the rate of 24 per 10,000 population, and white people at a rate of 3% 10,000 population. As in previous years, the number of white victims included victims of xenophobia against people not born in the UK. Jewish people were the victims of religiously motivated hate crimes at the rate of 121 per 10,000 population, more than double the 57 per 10,000 of the previous year. Muslims were targeted at a rate of 10 per 10,000 population, up from 9 per 10,000.

Around a half of all hate crime offences in 2025 were recorded as racially or religiously aggravated offences. These include assault with and without injury, criminal damage, harassment, public fear, alarm or distress. Other offences in this category include those against the remaining protected charactistics of disability, sexual orientation, transgender identity, or the perception of those characteristics. Following the murder of Sophie Lancaster in 2007, some UK police forces also record hate crimes motivated by hostility towards other characteristics such as sub-cultures and gender.

In 2022, black people were victims of racist or religiously motivated hate crimes at a rate of 33.8 aggravated offences per million people, Asians at a rate of 16.8 per million, and white people at a rate of 1.5 per million. In the case of white victims, this included victims of xenophobia against people not born in the UK. 42% of religious hate crime offences were targeted against Muslims (3,459 offences), followed by Jewish people at 23% (1,919 offences).

In 2025, while the victim’s ethnicity was not known for 45.0% of racially or religiously aggravated offences, those ethnicities that were reported show that most victims were either Asian or white. White people made up 81.7% of the population of England and Wales at the 2021 Census, Asian people made up 9.3%, and Black people made up 4.0%.

Victims of racial or religious hate crime (2025)
Ethnicity (where known)	%
Asian	31.3
White	30.6
Black	23.1
Mixed	8.1
Other	6.9

== Human trafficking ==
The United Kingdom (UK) is a destination country for men, women, and children primarily from Africa, Asia, and Eastern Europe who are subjected to human trafficking for the purposes of sexual slavery and forced labour, including domestic servitude. It is also a source country since some victims, including minors from the UK, are also sex trafficked within the country. British citizens accounted for 25% (4,299) of all recorded potential victims in 2023, when they represented the most frequently referred nationality. The majority (78%; 3,350) of UK nationals were child potential victims.

Precise details about the extent of human trafficking within the UK were not available in 2009, and the validity of some of the more widely quoted figures was questionable (such as the police estimate that there were up to 4,000 trafficking victims in the United Kingdom at any one time). Since then, the United Nations estimates that approximately 136,000 people were trafficked in the UK up to 2018.

According to the National Crime Agency (NCA), human trafficking in the United Kingdom is rapidly increasing. The number of potential victims referred to the National Referral Mechanism (NRM) rose from 2,340 in 2014 to more than 10,000 in 2020. There was also an increase in convictions from 71.9% in 2019 to 73.8% in 2020. In 2020, the US State Department estimated that there were 13,000 trafficking victims in the UK.

UK nationals were the most common potential victims in 2020, accounting for 34% (3,560) of all referrals. The second most referred nationality was Albanian (15%; 1,638), followed by Vietnamese nationals (6%; 653). UK nationals were most often referred for criminal exploitation, whilst both Albanian and Vietnamese nationals were most often referred for labour and criminal exploitation. Sexual exploitation was also commonly reported for Albanian nationals.

The fall of the Soviet Union and Eastern European communism has been identified as one of the main contributing factors in increases in human trafficking from Eastern Europe. It provided both human capital and new regional opportunities to fuel the expansion. After this period, trafficking expanded, aided by the rise of organised crime, porous borders and close proximity to Western Europe, making it easier and cheaper to transport victims within the region and abroad.

== Terrorism ==
The UK’s CONTEST strategy aims to prevent terrorism and other forms of extremism. It places a responsibility on education and health bodies to report individuals who are deemed to be at risk of radicalisation. The 2023 CONTEST report indicated that 75 per cent of the Security Service (MI5)'s caseload was from monitoring Islamist threats. In 2023, 80% of the Counter Terrorism Police network’s live investigations were Islamist while 10% were extreme Right-Wing. In 2024, polling by YouGov found that half of the public in Great Britain believed that Islamic extremists were the biggest extremist threat. 76% considered Islamic extremists to be a “big” or “moderate" threat, although attitudes differed significantly along political lines.

Of those stopped and searched in London under section 43 anti-terrorism powers between 2010/11 and 2020/21, 33% self-defined as white, 28% as Asian or Asian British, and 12% black or Black British.

Of those stopped for Schedule 7 of the Terrorism Act 2000 examinations between 2010/11 and 2020/21, 37% self-defined as white, 26% as Asian or Asian British, 19% as Chinese or another ethnicity, and 8% as black or Black British. In 2020/21, of those stopped, 24% were white, 25% Asian or Asian British, 25% were Chinese or another ethnicity, and 7% were black or Black British.

Following passage of the Prevention of Terrorism (Temporary Provisions) Act 1974, Irish people were particularly targeted by anti-terrorism powers in the United Kingdom. In 1992, researcher Paddy AR Hillyard concluded that the effects of this legislation amounted to institutionalised racism against Irish people in Britain. Following the 7 July 2005 London bombings, reports of racial, ethnic and religious profiling or assaults by police also increased, especially against British Asians.

In 2021, the proportion of white suspects arrested for terrorism offences had exceeded the number of Asian suspects for the fourth year in a row, according to a Home office report. White people accounted for 54% of all arrests (an increase of 10% over the previous year) while Asian suspects accounted for 26% (a decrease of 12% over the same period). This increase has been attributed to an increased number of police operations against far-right extremists.

Of those arrested for terrorist-related offences between 2011/12 and 2020/21, 44% were reported as being of Asian appearance, 33% White, 13% Black, and 10% Other or Not Known. As of 2021, 98 (46%) of the 215 prisoners in custody for terrorism connected offences defined themselves as Asian or Asian British, 68 (32%) as White and 18 (8%) as Black or Black British. The majority (73%) of prisoners in custody for terrorism-related offences on 31 March 2021 declared themselves as Muslim. 25 prisoners (12%) were of a Christian denomination.

=== Right-wing extremism ===
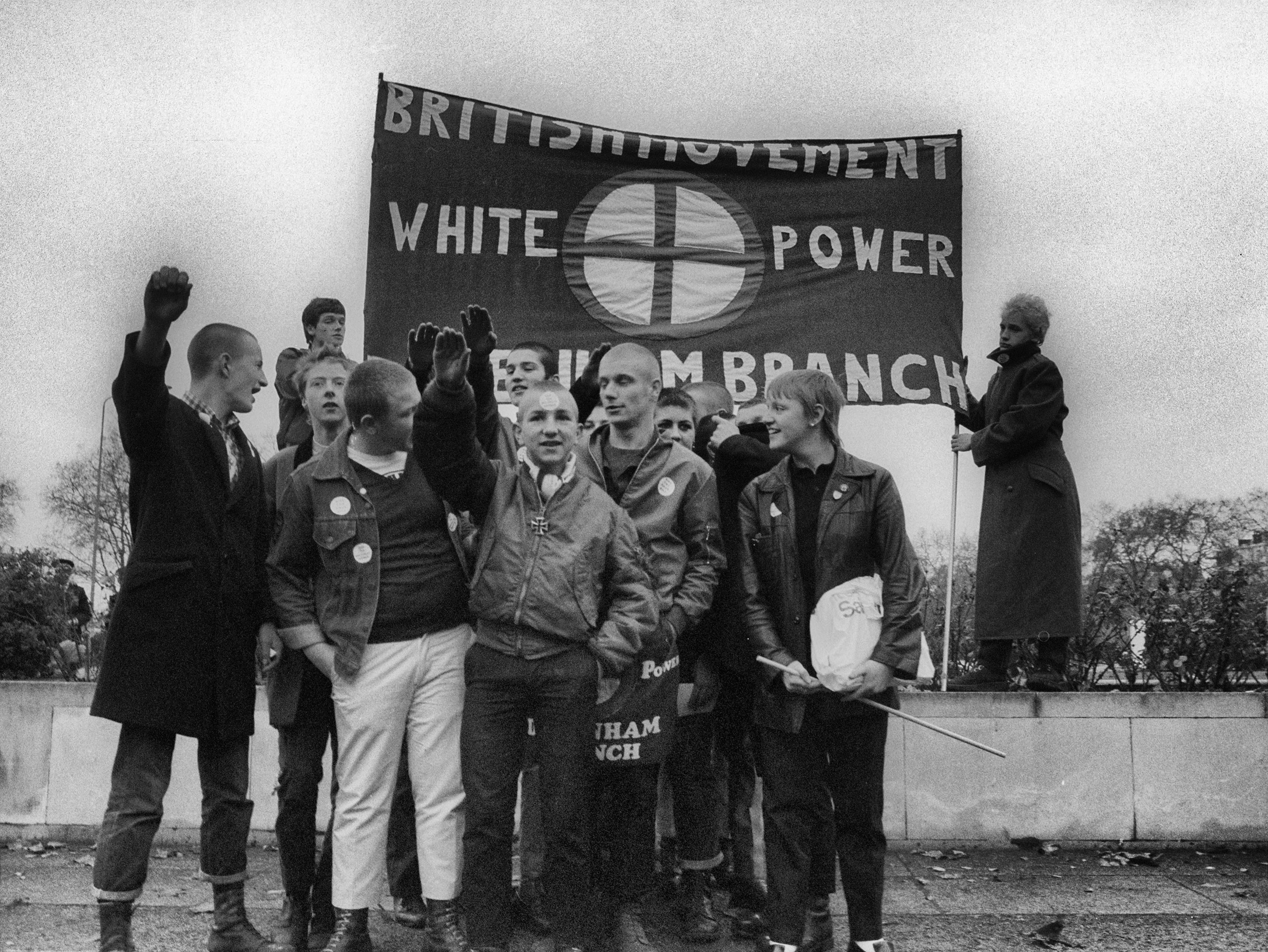
Participants in a British Movement march c. 1979

Research by the Welsh Government and the Equality and Human Rights Commission suggests that most perpetrators of racist hate crimes in the UK tend to be unemployed young white males with previous convictions.

Far-right extremism among white British men has increased significantly in the United Kingdom, and was described in 2022 as the fastest growing terror threat within the United Kingdom. 10 out of 29 terrorist attack plots disrupted between 2018 and 2021 were linked to the far-right. Director General of the MI5 Ken McCallum in his annual threat update of 2021 stated that racism is a significant causative factor in far-right extremism and a major cause for concern. Teenagers, some as young as 13, account for 13% of all suspects of terror-related offences. Metropolitan Police Commissioner Cressida Dick attributed this rise to young people's increased access to extremist content online.

=== Islamist terrorism ===
Islamist terrorism is the most significant terrorist threat to the UK by volume. Much of the volume of the threat is from individuals who have self-radicalised, seeking to carry out attacks using unsophisticated or low-sophistication methodologies. Generally, individuals will decide themselves to conduct an attack, rather than the attack being directed or controlled by a terrorist group. This can make it harder to identify terrorist activity.

== Causes ==
Various explanations have been given for the disproportionate representation rates of arrest and imprisonment of black and ethnic minorities. The earliest explanations, in the 19th century, offered a racist framing, focusing on the perceived biological and psychological characteristics of offenders, which were particularly influenced by the work of Charles Darwin and other Darwinists. Contemporary explanations tend to focus on racial bias and discrimination in policing and the criminal justice system, as well as socioeconomic and cultural factors. For example, Diane Abbott, the member of parliament for Hackney said in 2010: "There is no question but that the continuing achievement gap between black boys and the wider school population has some bearing on the involvement of African-Caribbean boys in gangs."

Research published by the Home Office—based on the Offending, Crime and Justice Survey of 2003—found that:

White respondents and those of Mixed ethnic origin were more likely to say they had offended, both on an ever and last year basis than other ethnic groups. This pattern held across offence categories and was also apparent for serious and frequent offending. Conversely, those of Asian origin were least likely to say they had offended.

The report suggests that these differences are partly accounted for by differences in the age profiles of the groups. The Home Office published an updated version of the survey (using 2006 data) showing that once other variables had been accounted for, ethnicity was not a significant predictor of offending, anti-social behaviour, or drug abuse amongst young people. This research suggests that the differences identified in the 2003 study are "attributable to other characteristics of these sample members", rather than ethnicity. The factors controlled for included weak school discipline, parenting, strong parental guidance, socioeconomic class, local drug problems, weak local control, siblings in trouble with the police, household size, gender, and family type.

A report by Her Majesty's Inspectorate of Constabulary and Fire & Rescue Services (HMICFRS) concluded that the negative effects of disproportionate stop and search leads to more black and ethnic minorities being initially drawn into the criminal justice system, skewing the stats, skewing perceptions, and disrupting family life, education and work opportunities. Other studies suggest that the disproportionate application of stop and search is largely a function of police policy and decision-making rather than crime and that police policy play a pivotal role in determining which groups are made available for prosecution and pushed deeper into the criminal justice system.

== See also ==
- Racial profiling in the United Kingdom
- Crime in the United Kingdom
- Race and crime in the United States
- Racial bias in criminal news
- IC codes
