= Crime in London =

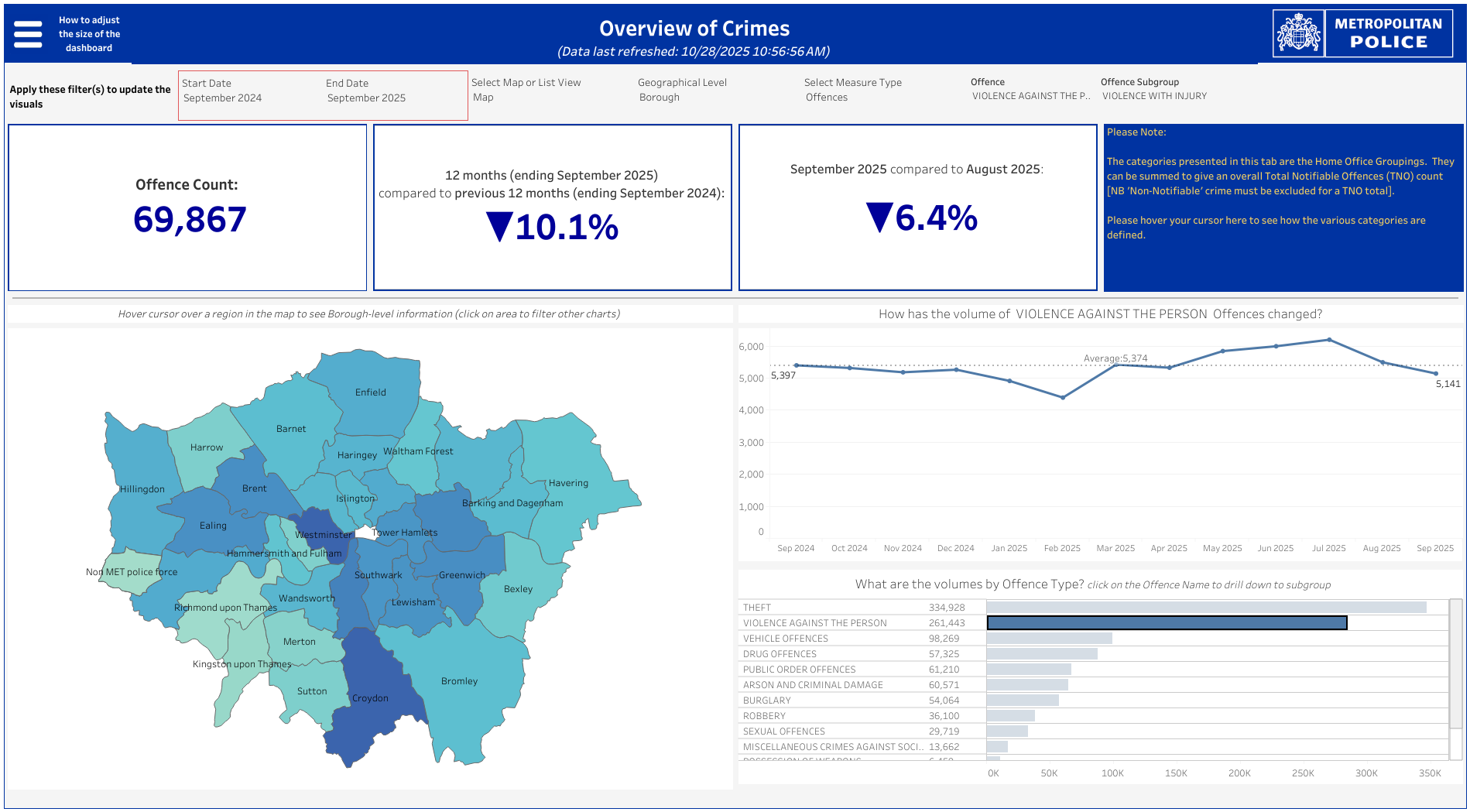
The Metropolitan Police Crime Dashboard

Figures on crime in London are based primarily on two sets of statistics: the Metropolitan Police (MPS) reported statistics, and the Mayor's Office for Policing & Crime (MOPAC) victim surveys. The Crime Survey for England and Wales (CSEW) contains London data, but its sample size is usually insufficient for precise estimates of London numbers.

Following a history of significant changes to UK national police reporting standards and systems, accurate trend data for many police-reported crimes in London has not been available until about 2002. Rises in violent crime from about 2012 onwards have, in common with the rest of the United Kingdom, been partially due to the effects of these improved reporting practices over time. Overall, crime in London since approximately 2017 has shown a downward trend, particularly in high-harm categories.

Greater London is generally served by three police forces; the MPS which is responsible for policing the vast majority of the capital, the City of London Police which is responsible for The Square Mile of the City of London and the British Transport Police, which polices the national rail network and the London Underground. A fourth police force in London, the Ministry of Defence Police, do not generally become involved with policing the general public. London also has a number of small constabularies for policing parks. Within the Home Office crime statistics publications, Greater London is referred to as the London Region.

== Data collection and publication ==
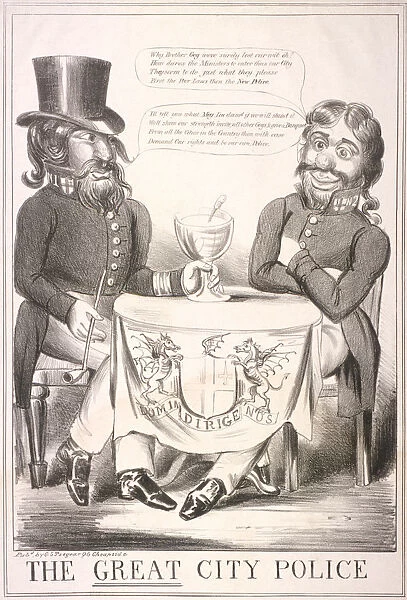
Two constables of the City of London Police, caricatured, 1840. See also History of the Metropolitan Police

Since the late 1990's, there have been multiple changes to the way the Metropolitan and national police forces in the UK gather, compile and report crime statistics. With the exception of homicide, which can be reliably compared over time, trend analysis over multi-year periods was very difficult until approximately 2012, particularly for non-homicide violent crimes. From 2013, reporting standards have been more effectively managed by the Home Office, and the Metropolitan Police Service note recent changes to their reporting on their monthly Crime Dashboard. From 2024, this dashboard combines what were multiple data sets into one place using the MPS's CONNECT system.

In addition to their Monthly Crime Dashboard, The Metropolitan Police publish statistics over multi-year periods using a number of dashboards and datasets available to the public. These include dedicated collections of data for specific areas of crime such as business offenses and violence as well as stop and search data.

The Mayor's Office for Policing & Crime (MOPAC) publishes quarterly performance reports for the Metropolitan Police Service (MPS) in the Greater London area, with crime statistics categorised under the London Policing Board's "Less Crime" objective.

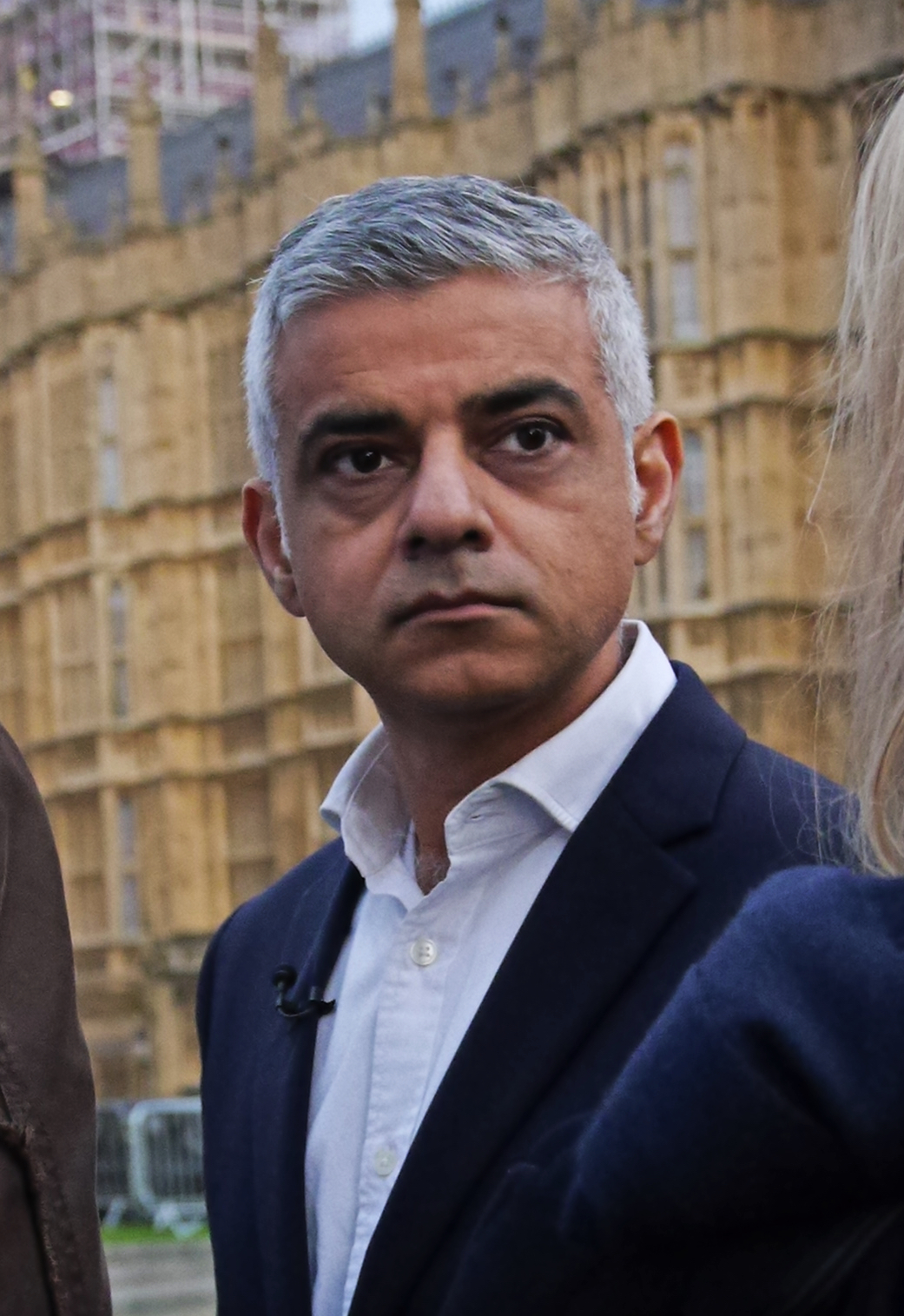
London Mayor Sadiq Khan is also the Police and Crime Commissioner for the city.

The Crime Survey for England and Wales (CSEW) also provides a measure of crime that is not reported to or recorded by the police. This provides a reliable long-term view of trends over time (the methodology has remained predominantly the same since 1982). However, while data for London residents is included, sample size is currently too small to provide precise estimates of the number of crimes in London alone, or for individual local areas within London.

== Current trends ==
The Mayor's Office for Policing & Crime figures for the first quarter of 2025/26 showed that rates of violence were lower in London than for England and Wales, and both have been reducing. Robbery, knife and theft rates were the highest nationally, but also reducing. Similarly, violence against women and girls (VAWG) were lower than in the rest of England and Wales, with positive outcomes higher than in previous years. Figures for hate crime and domestic abuse pre- and post-March 2024 are not directly comparable due to differences in how the new system records this data.

In 2025, His Majesty's Inspectorate of Constabulary and Fire & Rescue Services (HMICFRS) independently assessed the percentage of police-recorded crime in the UK as a whole as having risen from 80.5% in 2014 to 94.8%. Increases in crime in London over that period may therefore be partly due to improvements in the recording of reported crime, rather than an actual increase in crime experienced by residents and visitors to the city. Consequently, the ONS does not consider police recorded crime to be a good indicator of general trends in crime over long periods.

A report that London crime had risen five times faster than the rest of the country since Sadiq Khan became Mayor in 2016 was debunked by the independent fact checker Full Fact. The misinformation is credited to Dan Wootton in The Sun on 1 October 2020, who may have misinterpreted an article in the Evening Standard on 17 July 2020 claiming the "over-arching figure for the total number of offences recorded by Metropolitan Police in the last financial year rose by five per cent in 2018".

London's Violence Reduction Unit (VRU) compared MPS crime data and NHS hospital admissions in the 12 months to July/August 2026 against data prior to the VRU's establishment in 2018/2019. It found that trends in all violent crime categories had reduced over the period: violence with injury fell by 15.9%, gun crime by 27.8%, and personal robbery by 28.7%. Knife crime was excluded from pre-VRU comparisons due to MPS data recording changes introduced in April 2024, but in the 12 Months to August 2025, it fell by 9.7% (down 1,464 offences, from 15,112 to 13,648), along with similar reductions in other offenses. Violence with injury recorded a 1.3% increase (up 854 offences, from 64,824 to 65,678), though volumes remain below 2023 and pre-VRU levels. NHS admissions for assaults with a knife or sharp object among people under 25 (12 months to July 2026) decreased with a 22.4% drop (-75) compared to the previous year, and a 55.6% drop (-325) compared to 2018/19.

=== Public attitudes to crime and the police ===
MOPAC supplements data on police reported crime with public surveys into attitudes and experience with the police and crime overall. Summaries for these are published quarterly in the form of its "Public Voice" packs which refer to trends greater than 12-month periods.

== Violent crime ==
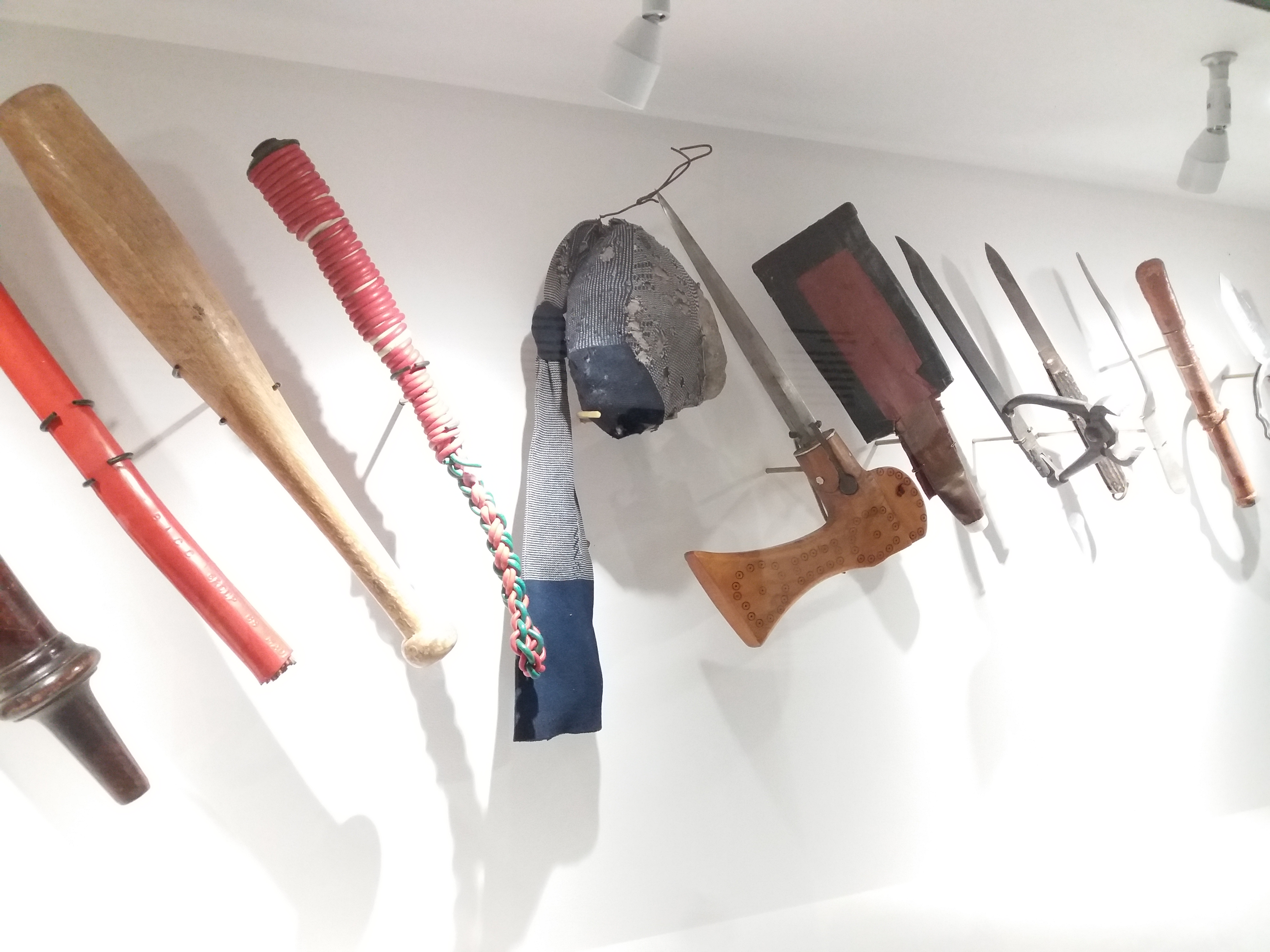
A collection of unusual weapons. City of London Police Museum, 2019.

Offences categorised as "violent crime" by the Home Office are violence against the person, including robbery and sexual offences; it sometimes includes kidnapping. It was announced in September 2018 that the city planned to emulate Scotland's public health approach, inspired by Cure Violence in Chicago, to violent crime. This saw the murder rate in Glasgow drop by more than a half between 2004 and 2017. In 2018, Sadiq Khan announced funding of £500,000 for a Violence Reduction Unit, although this was criticised as insufficient.

Nevertheless, in comparison to other cities London is relatively safe. The UK as a whole has a "high state of peace" on the Global Peace Index, above that of Sweden and Norway. Ranking sources also do not give London an unusually high score compared to other areas in England.

Violent crime in London has generally been decreasing in line with an overall reduction in crime for the UK. In the twelve months to March 2025, there were 26.40 recorded violence against the person offences per 1,000 population in the Met area, which was below the national average of 31.88 per 1,000 population. However, a disparity between the trend data from the Crime Survey for England and Wales and that of police reported crime has been noted, particularly in recent years. This highlights the problems inherent in measuring crime overall.

=== Homicide ===
Figures from 2023 showed that London's homicide rate was almost seven times lower than in Los Angeles, and four times lower than in New York. It was also lower than Berlin, but higher than Toronto.

London homicide rates (2008–2023)

Homicide rates for years between 2009-2007 averaged 174 per year in that period, (Note: Sources for this reference can be found here:) but with lower population in the earlier years. From 2008 to 2023, the number of homicides recorded by police in London has averaged significantly lower at 124 per year, or approximately 1.2 per 100,000 people. The highest number recorded was in 2008 with 155, peaking again in 2019 with 153 and the lowest year being 2014 with 94. 2021 broke the record set in 2008 for teen homicide, reportedly the highest rate since World War II.

In the year to June 2025, the figure for all homicides was 101, with Croydon and Lambeth having the highest levels for that period. In October 2025, MOPAC published a summary of data showing homicides at their lowest since monthly records began, a fall of almost 60% compared to 2003.

=== Moped crime ===
From 2014 there was a substantial rise in robberies and assaults committed by individuals riding mopeds; crime involving mopeds rose by more than 600% in London between 2014 and 2016. Since then, moped offences in London fell 56% from the high of July 2017 following a joint police operation which reduced the total number of moped crimes to below 4,000 in 2021, a number still significantly higher than the pre-2014 surge at roughly 1,000 per year.

=== Assault with injury ===
Multiple changes in police recording practices have led to significant discontinuity in recorded crime figures for violence over time. This has meant police-reported longitudinal statistics are difficult if not impossible to compare before 2012. In particular, Violence Against the Person now supersedes the old Assault With Injury category, which in turn replaced Actual Bodily Harm (ABH) and Grievous Bodily Harm (GBH) categories in 2002-3. As of October 2025, Violence With Injury offences now include Death or Serious Injury Caused by Illegal Driving.

In 2008-09, there were 70,962 Assault with Injury offences in London with a rate of 9.5 per 1,000 residents. This was slightly higher than the total rate for England and Wales, which was 7.0 per 1,000 residents. This compares to 2021-25, when 69,867 Violence with Injury offences were recorded using the latest classification.

=== Gun and knife crime ===
The Metropolitan Police have a number of operations that concentrate on knife and gun crime. These include Operation Trident and Trafalgar, which deal with fatal and non-fatal shootings across London, and Operation Blunt, which was initially launched across 12 boroughs in 2004 to tackle knife crime. Operation Blunt was subsequently rolled out across 32 boroughs in 2005 after early successes and re-launched as Operation Blunt II in 2008 with the aim of tackling serious youth violence. In addition to this there is the Specialist Firearms Command formerly known as SO19.

==== Gun crime ====
The MPS publishes information on gun crime as part of its Crime Data Dashboard with underlying data available monthly at the London DataStore. The classification of a gun crime is used when a firearm is "involved" in an offence when it is either fired (discharged), used as a blunt instrument, used as a threat, or which includes where a victim is convinced of the presence of a firearm (even if concealed) and there is evidence of the suspect intending to create that impression.

Since 2000, there has been consistent fluctuations in the number of gun-enabled crimes recorded by the Metropolitan Police, which peaked in 2003 when there were 4,444 recorded offences. The lowest number of offences recorded was potentially in 2008, where there were just 1,980 gun crimes between December 2007 and November 2008, an unusually low figure in comparison to other years. Since then, however, gun-enabled crime has increased, with the number of recorded offenses being 2,017 between September 2024-25, at an average of 136 offenses per month from 2021. However, the sub-category of Lethal Barrel Discharge (where a gun has been fired) has shown a decreasing trend since 2022 with an average of 15 per month from a peak of 36 in 2022 to a low of 5 in 2024.

==== Knife crime ====
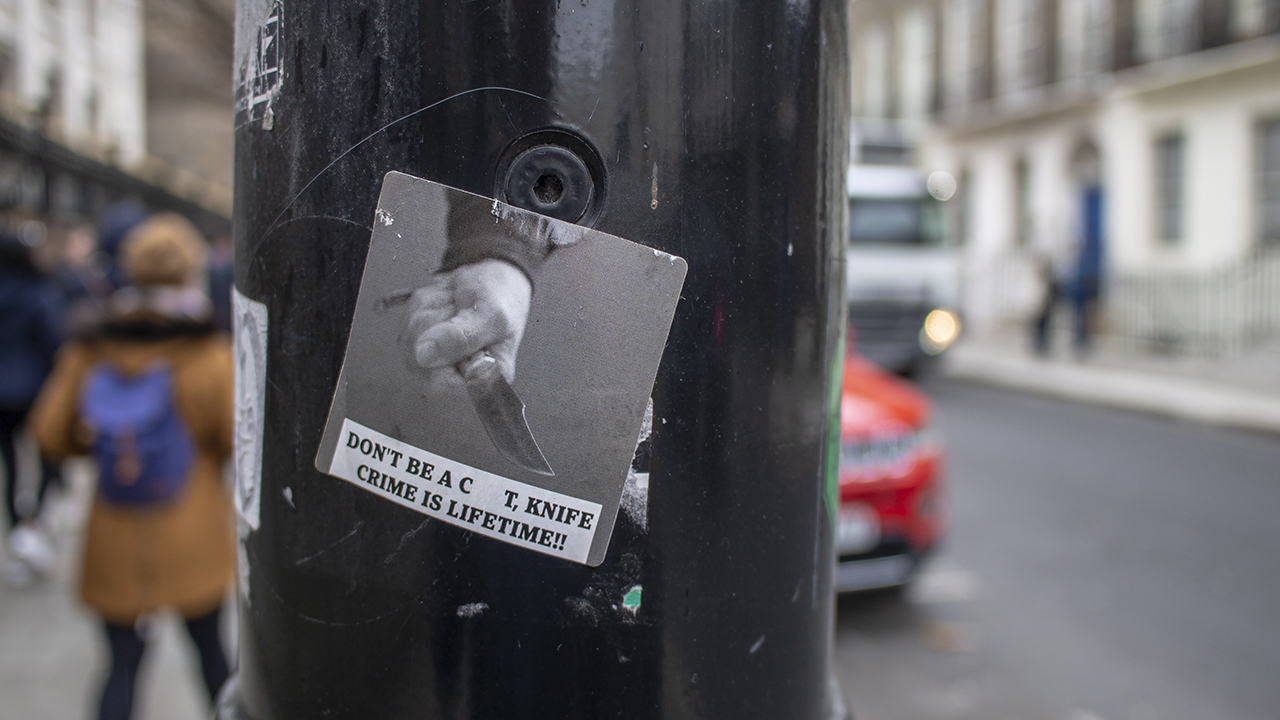
An anti knife-crime sticker, London, 2024

As of April 2015, the MPS maintains historic data on knife-enabled crime updated monthly with summaries and analysis published as part of quarterly bulletins. The data contains a breakdown of the characteristics of each crime, including where a knife or sharp instrument was used or threatened. There is also a note on whether the crime was part of domestic abuse.

Knife crime offenses (2021–2025)

Following an increase in knife crime from April 2010 (1,093) to November 2018 (1,208), the Mayor of London, Sadiq Khan, said that offenders would be tagged with tracking GPS devices for a year upon their release from the prison, recording their movements against the location of reported crimes, reverting to police with the information. Between 2016 and 2023, knife crime rose 54% in London, from 9,086 incidents in the year ended 31 March 2016, to 14,000 in the year ended 30 September 2023.

As of 2025, the majority of knife-enabled offences are robbery (60% of offences) and victims are male, about half being under 25. Knife-enabled crime levels to August 2025 were lower than those reported in 2024, with a consistent pattern of reductions in all but the North East, which saw a small increase.

=== Robbery ===
Statistics for Robbery (stealing from a person) and Burglary (breaking and entering to commit theft) are reported separately by the Metropolitan Police, sub-divided by residential and business, with subgroups for these (eg burglary from unconnected buildings). Theft offences recorded by the Crime Survey for England and Wales (CSEW) includes all personal and household crime where items are stolen, but police data are preferred for robbery offences. This is because CSEW results for London are not only sub-sets of national data, but are subject to high year-to-year volatility due to the small number of victims found in the sample.

Following changes in counting rules of crimes, and the later introduction of the National Crime Recording Standard, offences of robbery rose both nationally and within London. In London, offences increased by 25% in 1999, compared with 1998, peaking in 2001/02 when the robbery rate in London reached 7.1 offences per 1,000 population.

In March 2002, the government launched the 'Street Crime Initiative' with the aim of reducing robbery in the most affected police forces. This reduced robbery in London by 27% from 53,547 in 2001/02 to 39,033 in 2004/05. After the initiative had finished, robbery offences increased and stayed at a rate of around 6.0 per 1,000 for the next two financial years, with a steady annual decline across London since 2006/07. The increases in robbery were largely attributed to the rise in youth on youth robberies, with particular focus around schools and transport interchanges, and increased usage and ownership of items such as mobile phones - one of the most commonly stolen items. The increases that followed the end of the Street Crime Initiative were thought somewhat to be a result of the increased mobility of young people when the introduction of Oyster cards to provide under-16s free travel on London's transport network.

Between September 2024-25, there were 54,064 crimes of Robbery (up 8.7% from the previous 12 months) and 36,100 crimes of Burglary (down 6.3%). The theft of mobile phones, while not given its own category in police-reported crime statistics, has been growing. In 2019 there were 91,481 recorded thefts compared to 117,211 in 2024. Demand for second-hand phones, combined with the relative ease with which stolen phones can be re-sold by criminal gangs, are thought to be the main drivers.

==== Bicycle theft ====
In 2014, the number of bicycles reported stolen came to 17,809. This compares to 16,187 in the 12 months ending September 2025, down 9.2% from the previous 12 month period. However, the true number of bicycle thefts may be much larger as many victims do not report it to the police. According to the British Crime Survey and Transport for London, only one in four victims of bicycle thefts actually report the crime.

== Race and crime ==
As of 2024, 46% of Londoners are of an ethnic minority, (Note: "Ethnic miorities" cover all groups except White British. This includes white minority groups such as Gypsy, Roma and Irish Traveller, and in some cases characteristics of religion. For example, Jewish people and Sikhs are also classed as ethnic groups under the Equality Act 2010.) compared to 14% in the rest of England, while 13.5% of the population of London is black.

The connections between race and crime in the city have been the subject of multiple studies. A Home Office report in 2003 found that 70% of mugging victims on commuter railways around London identified their muggers as black. The study also reported that 87% of victims in Lambeth, South London, told the police that their attackers were black. 38% of acid attack suspects in London were of African Caribbean background in 2017, and 25% of the victims. In 2020, an estimated 70% of London's brothels were controlled by Albanians. Evidence shows that the black population in London boroughs increases with the level of deprivation, and that the level of crime increases it, such that ethnicity, deprivation, victimisation and offending are inter-related.

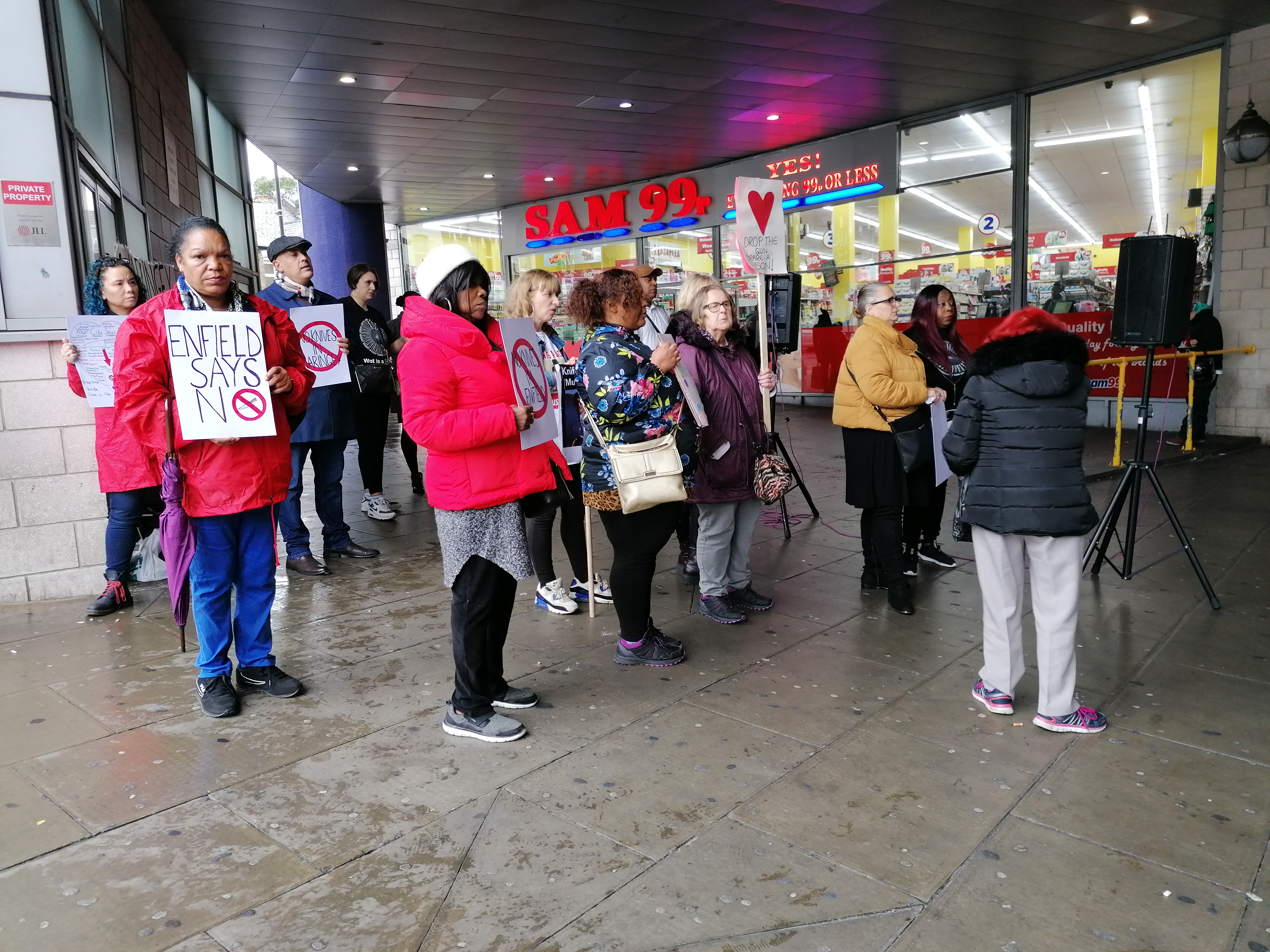
An anti-knife crime demonstration in Wood Green, north London, October 2019

In 2020, figures from the London Mayor's office showed black Londoners were almost four times more likely to be stopped and searched, and six times more likely to be stopped in a car, than white Londoners. Subsequently, London Mayor Sadiq Khan published an action plan to address the police force's disproportionate use of these and other powers, such as the use of tasers, against black people on the city. In response, Metropolitan Police Commissioner Cressida Dick said the force was "not free of discrimination, racism or bias", and committed to rebuilding trust with black communities. In 2022, Deputy Assistant Commissioner Bas Javid also said the Metropolitan Police had a problem with racism.

Figures from 2017 showed the most common reason for a search was suspected drugs possession. Asians were most commonly stopped in relation to drugs (66%), and then blacks (62%). Whites were subjected to a notable lower level of drug searches (50%). Despite this, whites had the lowest rate of NFA (no further action). For Asians, 60% of individuals were no further actioned and 28% were arrested. For blacks, roughly 61% of individuals were no further actioned and 20% were arrested. For whites, only 53% were no further actioned while the arrest rate was 27%. Overall, blacks had the lowest arrest rate and the highest no further action rate, despite being subjected to twice as many searches as whites. When stopped, whites were the most likely to be found in breach of drug laws, having the lowest corresponding no further action rate.

Crimes in London by racial groups of the accused (2022)

- White
- Black
- Asian
- Other
- Unknown

== Notable crime ==
- Jack the Ripper terrorised London in the 19th century.
- In the 80s and 90s, the IRA set off a number of bombs in London.
- The racist murder of Stephen Lawrence in 1993.
- The racist murder of child Richard Everitt in 1994.
- In July 2005, terrorists set off four bombs on three London Underground trains and a double-decker bus, killing 52 and injuring over 700, in the country's first Islamist suicide attack.
- Murder of Fusilier Lee Rigby. A British Army soldier was killed in a Islamist terrorist attack in 2013.
- Wayne Couzens, a Metropolitan Police constable, kidnapped Sarah Everard and later raped and murdered her in 2021.

== See also ==
- Crime in the United Kingdom
- Gangs in the United Kingdom
- Crime statistics in the United Kingdom
