= Notifiable offence =

A notifiable offence is any offence under United Kingdom law where the police must inform the Home Office, who use the report to compile crime statistics. The term Notifiable Offence is sometimes confused with recordable offence.

The consistency, reliability and rate at which police forces in the United Kingdom have reported offences has been subject to a long and on-going history of changes an improvements.

== Reporting notifiable offences ==
There are strict rules regarding the recording of crime which is outlined in the National Crime Recording Standards and the Home Office Crime Counting Rules. An incident will be recorded as a crime (notifiable offence);

For offences against an identifiable victim if, on the balance of probability;

1. The circumstances as reported amount to a crime defined by law (the police will determine this, based on their knowledge of the law and counting rules and,
2. There is no credible evidence to the contrary.

For offences against the state (against society) the points to prove to evidence the offence must clearly be made out, before a crime is recorded. An offence is regarded as being "against the state" where there is no specific identifiable victim, an example being dangerous driving.

The following offences are generally categorised as notifiable offences;

- violence, damage, firearms, public order
- dishonesty, obscenity, drugs and sexual offences
- data protection
- the more serious road traffic offences

== See also ==
- Crime statistics in the United Kingdom
- Recordable offence
