= Crime in the United Kingdom =

Number of crime incidents by main crime types (England & Wales)

Crime in the United Kingdom describes acts of violent crime and non-violent crime that take place within England and Wales, Scotland and Northern Ireland, the three legal jurisdictions of the United Kingdom.

The interpretation of crime statistics in the UK can be problematic without being aware of limitations in the data. Since 1998, apparent increases in some high-harm offences such as knife crime and other 'violence against the person' are largely due to changes in police counting rules, particularly since 2014. However, consistent data from the Crime Survey for England and Wales (CSEW) makes reliable comparisons for most crimes possible from 1981.

In common with many countries around the world, crime overall in the UK has fallen very significantly since 1996, while some categories such as fraud and computer misuse have seen increases together with sporadic rises in racial hate crimes.

The United Kingdom's crime rate remains relatively low when compared to the rest of the world, while somewhat higher than some of its European neighbours. Police recorded crime rates in Scotland are not directly comparable to the rest of the UK due to differences in counting rules.

The portrayal, mythology and reporting of crime has played a significant cultural role in Britain from at least the eighteenth century.

== Justice and enforcement ==
Responsibility for crime in England and Wales is split between the Home Office, the government department responsible for reducing and preventing crime, along with law enforcement in the United Kingdom; and the Ministry of Justice, which runs the judicial system, including its courts and prisons. In Scotland, this responsibility falls on the Crown Office and Procurator Fiscal Service, which acts as the sole public prosecutor in Scotland, and is therefore responsible for the prosecution of crime in Scotland.

There are 48 police forces in the UK. These consist of 39 territorial police forces in England, four in Wales, one in Scotland, and one in Northern Ireland. Each is responsible for most law enforcement and crime reduction in its police area. The territorial police forces of England and Wales are overseen by the Home Office and by a police and crime commissioner or other police authority, although they are operationally independent from government. The other three police forces are the British Transport Police (BTP), the Civil Nuclear Constabulary (CNC), and the Ministry of Defence Police (MDP), which provide specialist policing services.

== Demographics ==
As of 2024, the strength of the police force in England and Wales was 236,588. 72% were police officers and the remaining 28% support staff, designated officers and Police Community Support Officers (PCOs). 35% were female, and 8% declared themselves as being from a minority ethnic group (the proportion of which in the general population of England and Wales being 18.3%).

In 2019, 74% of individuals dealt with by the criminal justice system were male and 26% were female, with these proportions remaining constant over the previous 5 years. This compares to males comprising 96% of the prison population in 2023.

Prison population in England and Wales (2024)
| Age | Population |
|---|---|
| 30-39 | 29,339(33%) |
| 40-49 | 18,175(21%) |
| 25-29 | 13,226(15%) |
| 50-59 | 9,391(11%) |
| 21-24 | 8,155(9%) |
| 18-20 | 3,090(4%) |
| 15-17 | 254(0.3%) |
| 60+ | 6,229(7%%) |

In 2017, 25,700 children above the age of criminal responsibility (10 years old), and beneath the majority (18), were found guilty of indictable offences. A further 13,500 were cautioned

== Extent of crime ==
While the UK is generally considered safe and has significantly lower rates of certain serious crimes compared to many countries globally, its standing in relation to other Western European or developed nations is often less favourable.

West Yorkshire Police (Leeds and Bradford) have tended to record the most crimes per head of population compared to other urban forces, but the difference in the figures is low.

=== England and Wales ===
Crime in England and Wales
- Homicide: 1.148 (2021)
- Assault: 950.7 (2022)
- Kidnapping: 11.6 (2022)
- Robbery: 123.3 (2023)
- Burglary: 446.8 (2021)
- Theft: 2694.9 (2018)
- Rape: 117.3 (2022)
- Sexual assault: 125.9 (2022)
- per 100,000 inhabitants

The Crime Survey for England and Wales (CSEW) is the preferred source for long-term trends since 1981, although the Office for National Statistics (ONS) supplements its limitations for some categories using police data and other sources.

==== Fraud ====
Fraud is the most common crime experienced in the UK. While it is estimated that only one in eight incidents are reported to police, fraud consistently accounts for around 40% of all crimes reported by victims in the Crime Survey for England and Wales (CSEW). In 2022, the majority of online fraud in the United Kingdom was found to be perpetrated by industrial-scale scamming call centres in Asia.

In 2023, the UK's National Strategy marked a fundamental shift in how the government intended to respond to fraud against individuals. The strategy directs a multi-agency approach to fraud, but has been criticised as being poorly formulated to address the characteristics and nature of the crime itself, while the UK's police inspectorate HMIRCS has expressed concerns over the rise in fraud cases, variations in police responses and priorities, poor service to victims, and the need for a focus on prevention.

In 2025, out of the estimated 4.1 million incidents of fraud (a 14% increase compared with 2024), around 3 million incidents involved a loss. Victims said that they were fully reimbursed in 2.2 million of these cases. Bank and credit account fraud is the most prevalant, followed by consumer and retail, advanced fee, and other fraud types. These latter types formed most of the increase in 2024-25.

Total estimates of losses from all types of fraud vary considerably. In July 2016, the National Crime Agency stated a figure for annual losses at more than £190 billion, with the anti-fraud charity Fraud Advisory Panel setting business fraud at £144 billon and individuals losing approximately £9.7 billion. A figure of £2.11 billion was cited by the Financial Times in 2017, and the government's National Strategy set estimated losses of at least £6.8 billion for the year ending March 2020. In 2021 the House of Commons Library claimed that fraud could cost the UK over £137 billion a year.

In addition to directly reported losses in 2020, using the Quality Adjusted Life Years approach (a measure used to quantify the emotional impacts of anxiety, depression, and fear), costs associated with prevention, loss of productivity by victims, health treatments, and criminal justice processes set the biggest single loss at £1.3 billion while police costs in response to crime were assessed at £0.2 billion.

Figures for losses per crime also show variations. In 2020, 26% of cases reported in the Crime Survey for England and Wales involved no loss. Of those that did, 76% involved losses of less than £500 with a median loss of £150. The average loss for the 875,000 cases sent to the National Fraud Intelligence Bureau for potential dissemination to police forces was just over £2,600, with an average loss £7,500 for reports to Action Fraud.

2022, in the two thirds of incidents for which victims suffered a financial loss, over three quarters (77%) incurred a loss of less than £250, with the median loss being £79; around 14% incurred a loss of between £250 and £999 and the remaining 9% incurred a loss of £1,000 or more. Data from fraud using Authorised Push Payment (APP) in 2023 showed that 4.6% of incidents relating to individuals involve amounts over £10,000 and 70% lost less than £1,000. The losses for the 4.6% represented over 13% of the payment transactions and over 60% of total losses.

Of the fraud offences recorded by the police in 2024, only 2% of were referred to territorial forces for investigation, although the number of fraud offences referred increased by 37% while positive outcomes declined 15%.

From 2024, the latest figures for police-reported fraud are published online by the City of London Police's Report Fraud Analysis Services.

==== Theft ====
While the CSEW is the best source of long-term trends in theft, specific offences such as burglary are also well reported and well recorded by police.

Overall, theft has been declining. While rates were similar over 2024-25, this was 32% lower compared with the 2015 survey (4.0 million incidents) and 76% lower than the peak in 1995 (11.6 million incidents).

==== Violence ====
The CSEW is a good indicator of violence, with or without injury, for the household population. However, it underestimates domestic violence because victims may not disclose it to interviewers. From 2024, the Office for National Statistics has a separate analysis for domestic violence using the CSEW's 'self completion module', whereby victims fill in that part of the survey themselves. Comparisons cannot be made before March 2024 because of the introduction of this new method.

In 2025, people aged 16 years and over experienced an estimated 1.1 million incidents of violence with or without injury. This was 34% lower than the previous decade (1.7 million incidents in 2015) and 75% lower than its peak in 1995 (4.5 million incidents). For domestic abuse in that year, the CSEW showed that 7.8% of people aged 16 years and over experienced domestic abuse in the last year (around 3.8 million people).

==== Computer misuse ====
2025 showed a 35% fall in incidents of unauthorised access to personal information (to around 536,000 incidents). This was 62% lower than the March 2017 survey (around 1.8 million incidents), which is the earliest comparable year.

The National Fraud Intelligence Bureau (NFIB) reported a 26% increase in offences in that year (57,245 offences), compared with 2024 (45,345 offences). This was because of increases in social media and email hacking offences, personal hacking offences, and computer virus or malware offences.

==== Criminal damage ====
The CSEW estimated 587,000 incidents of criminal damage in 2025. While there was no statistically significant change compared with the previous year, this was 56% lower compared with the 2015 survey (1.3 million incidents) and 83% lower than the peak in the YE December 1995 survey (3.4 million incidents).

Police recorded 435,073 criminal damage offences in 2025, a 6% fall compared with the previous year.

==== Robbery ====
Robbery involves the use of force, or threat of force, to attempt or complete a theft. Police data is generally preferred for robbery, because the low frequency of its occurrence makes the sample rate in the CSEW too small to establish reliable trends.

There were 80,297 robbery offences in 2025, a 2% decrease from the previous year. However, there was a 55% increase in robbery of business property (18,534 offences). This was offset by a 12% decrease in robbery of personal property (61,763 offences). Overall robbery offences were still 11% lower than 2020 (90,195).

==== Knife or sharp instruments ====
Most knife-enabled crime (which includes knives or sharp instruments used to injure, attempt to injure, or as a threat) takes place in metropolitan areas across England and Wales.

In 2025, the Metropolitan Police Service (MPS) recorded 30% of all offences, the West Midlands Police recorded 8%, and Greater Manchester Police recorded 6%. While the MPS recorded no change in knife-enabled crime compared with the previous year (15,639 offences in 2025 compared with 15,644 offences 2024), West Midlands police recorded a 16% decrease (to 4,309 offences) and Greater Manchester Police recorded a 6% decrease (to 3,180 offences).

Nationally, knife-enabled crime recorded by the police decreased by 5% in 2025 (51,527 offences), compared with 2024 (54,215 offences). This was 7% lower than 2020 (55,170 offences). Fewer than 1% of knife-enabled crimes were homicide offences (0.4%).

Provisional data for NHS hospitals in England and Wales in 2025 also showed a 10% decrease in the number of admissions for assault by a sharp object in (3,460 admissions). This was 27% below 2020 (4,769 admissions).

==== Homicide ====
The police recorded 518 homicide offences in 2025. This was a 6% decrease from 552 offences in the previous year and the lowest figure since current police recording practices began in 2003.

The United Nations Office on Drugs and Crime (UNODC) uses homicide rate as a proxy for overall violence, as this type of crime is one of the most accurately reported of the internationally comparable indicators. On this metric, the UK is similar to its European neighbours.

2021 homicide rates compared
| Country | Rate per 100,000 population |
|---|---|
| US | 6.78 |
| UK | 1.15 |
| France | 1.11 |
| Sweden | 1.08 |
| Greece | 0.84 |
| Germany | 0.83 |
| Poland | 0.72 |
| Spain | 0.61 |
| Norway | 0.54 |
| Italy | 0.51 |

==== Hate crimes ====
The Office for National Statistics (ONS) cautions that due to changes and improvements in the way police have recorded hate crime since 2014, increases in police reported figures are not a reliable indicator of actual trends. The Crime Survey for England and Wales (CSEW), which is not affected by changes in crime recording, shows a long-term decline in victim-reported figures: a 38% fall in between the combined years ending March 2008 and 2020. The police and other agencies in the criminal justice system agreed a common definition of hate crime in 2007, which included racially-motivated crime.

However, police recorded hate crime of all categories has shown an increase over time, especially around certain events in recent history. These include the EU Referendum in June 2016, the 2017 Westminster attacks, the widespread Black Lives Matter protests and far-right counter-protests. At the start of the coronavirus pandemic, hate crimes directed at both South and East Asian communities significantly increased.

In the year ending March 2024, offences motivated by race accounted for 70% (98,799) of all hate crimes, (Note: Due to a change in the Metropolitan Police Service crime recording system, London's data for the year ending March 2025 is not comparable with data supplied in previous years and was excluded from the trend analysis.) down 5% from the previous year (103,625). While crimes motivated by race declined on the whole, religiously motivated hate crimes increased 25%, driven largely by an increase in antisemitic hate crimes and a smaller increase in Islamophobic hate crimes following the onset of the Gaza war. Black people were victims of racially aggravated offences at the rate of 41 per 10,000 population, Asian people at the rate of 24 per 10,000 population, and white people at a rate of 3% 10,000 population. As in previous years, the number of white victims included victims of xenophobia against people not born in the UK. Jewish people were the victims of religiously motivated hate crimes at the rate of 121 per 10,000 population, more than double the 57 per 10,000 of the previous year. Muslims were targeted at a rate of 10 per 10,000 population, up from 9 per 10,000.

Around a half of all hate crime offences in 2025 were recorded as racially or religiously aggravated offences. These include assault with and without injury, criminal damage, harassment, public fear, alarm or distress. Other offences in this category include those against the remaining protected charactistics of disability, sexual orientation, transgender identity, or the perception of those characteristics. Following the murder of Sophie Lancaster in 2007, some UK police forces also record hate crimes motivated by hostility towards other characteristics such as sub-cultures and gender.

In 2022, black people were victims of racist or religiously motivated hate crimes at a rate of 33.8 aggravated offences per million people, Asians at a rate of 16.8 per million, and white people at a rate of 1.5 per million. In the case of white victims, this included victims of xenophobia against people not born in the UK. 42% of religious hate crime offences were targeted against Muslims (3,459 offences), followed by Jewish people at 23% (1,919 offences).

In 2025, while the victim’s ethnicity was not known for 45.0% of racially or religiously aggravated offences, those ethnicities that were reported show that most victims were either Asian or white. White people made up 81.7% of the population of England and Wales at the 2021 Census, Asian people made up 9.3%, and Black people made up 4.0%.

Victims of racial or religious hate crime (2025)
| Ethnicity (where known) | % |
|---|---|
| Asian | 31.3 |
| White | 30.6 |
| Black | 23.1 |
| Mixed | 8.1 |
| Other | 6.9 |

=== London ===
The Mayor's Office for Policing & Crime figures for the first quarter of 2025/26 showed that rates of violence were lower in London than for England and Wales, and both have been reducing. Robbery, knife and theft rates were the highest nationally, but also reducing. Similarly, violence against women and girls (VAWG) were lower than in the rest of England and Wales, with positive outcomes higher than in previous years. Figures for hate crime and domestic abuse pre- and post-March 2024 are not directly comparable due to differences in how the new system records this data.

In 2025, His Majesty's Inspectorate of Constabulary and Fire & Rescue Services (HMICFRS) independently assessed the percentage of police-recorded crime in the UK as a whole as having risen from 80.5% in 2014 to 94.8%. Increases in crime in London over that period may therefore be partly due to improvements in the recording of reported crime, rather than an actual increase in crime experienced by residents and visitors to the city. Consequently, the ONS does not consider police recorded crime to be a good indicator of general trends in crime over long periods.

A report that London crime had risen five times faster than the rest of the country since Sadiq Khan became Mayor in 2016 was debunked by the independent fact checker Full Fact. The misinformation is credited to Dan Wootton in The Sun on 1 October 2020, who may have misinterpreted an article in the Evening Standard on 17 July 2020 claiming the "over-arching figure for the total number of offences recorded by Metropolitan Police in the last financial year rose by five per cent in 2018".

== Stolen goods trafficking ==
Between 2013 and 2024, Britain experienced a sharp resurgence in high-value theft, reversing the decline seen in the 1990s. While some of this was due to increased accuracy in police-recorded crime practices from 2014, vehicle thefts rose from approximately 90,000 in 2020 to 130,000 in 2024, a 75% increase over the decade. London has simultaneously become the leading European hotspot for mobile-phone theft, with 70,000 devices stolen in 2024 alone, representing about 40% of all cases in Europe. Agricultural theft has also intensified, with the value of claims for stolen GPS equipment on British farms increasing by 137% in 2023, partly linked to shortages following sanctions on Russia. Stolen items are rarely retained within the country: instead, they are channelled into global supply chains for resale in Africa, Asia, and Eastern Europe.

The trade in stolen goods operates through a decentralised but highly structured system described as 'Grand Theft Global Inc.'. Thieves typically sell vehicles or phones to intermediaries, who then use specialist services to disguise, transport, and export them. Cars are often fitted with false number plates, GPS jammers, and altered vehicle identification numbers before being loaded into shipping containers. Phones are concealed in Faraday bags or foil to block tracking signals. By 2024, most stolen vehicles intercepted at British ports were bound either for the Democratic Republic of Congo or the United Arab Emirates, while the majority of stolen phones traced overseas were located in Shenzhen, China, a global centre for second-hand electronics. The entire process, from theft to containerisation, can occur in less than 24 hours.

Britain's role as a hub for this trade stems from several structural weaknesses. The country combines a dense market for high-value consumer goods with minimal scrutiny of exports. Enforcement capacity is limited: in 2024 only about 5% of all crimes, and 2% of vehicle thefts, were solved. At major ports such as Felixstowe, more than 11,000 containers pass through daily, yet only a negligible fraction are inspected, often only following intelligence tips. Internationally, container shipping practices - where exporters can book space anonymously through layers of freight forwarders - further reduce accountability. These features make it comparatively easy to move stolen goods abroad with low risk of interception.

The growth of large-scale theft has had measurable consequences for consumers and insurers. Between 2020 and 2024, the cost of car insurance in Britain increased by 45% in real terms, compared to inflation-level rises in the European Union. Low-level thieves typically receive £1,500 for stealing a vehicle such as a Toyota Hilux, which can later sell for over £40,000 in African markets, illustrating the profitability of the trade. For stolen phones, thieves may be paid £100-200 for unlocked devices, which are then refurbished or dismantled in Shenzhen. The relatively low risk of prosecution has encouraged some organised-crime groups, including drug gangs, to diversify into this area, further intertwining theft with broader criminal activity.

== Scotland ==
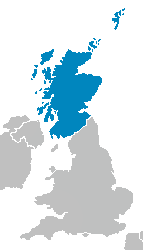
Jurisdiction of Police Scotland

Police-recorded crime statistics in Scotland cannot be directly compared to those of England and Wales or Northern Ireland, due to the different way Scottish counting rules operate.

In the year ending September 2025, Police Scotland recorded 305,925 crimes. This was 2% (or 5,789 crimes) higher than the 300,136 crimes recorded in the previous year, and 3% higher than the 297,712 crimes recorded in the year ending September 2021.

In 2007-8, there were 114 homicide victims in Scotland, which had decreased to 47 in 2024-25. Crimes of dishonesty are the largest crime group by volume, with road traffic offences the largest offence group.

Since the 1980s, the Scottish Crime and Justice Survey (SCJS) has gathered data from victims' reports of crime. From the survey year 2023/24, this also includes crimes of fraud and computer misuse, and showed that these crimes made up over two-fifths (44%) of all crime in that year, affecting almost one-in-ten adults. Property crimes made up over a third (36%) of all crimes, with the largest categories being other household theft (32% of property crime) and vandalism (31%). Violent crimes made up the remaining fifth (20%) of all crimes, with the majority of these being minor assault (74% of violent crimes).

== Northern Ireland ==
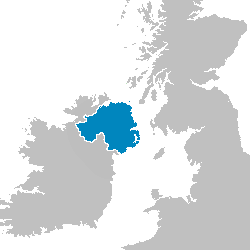
Jurisdiction of the PSNI

The Police Service for Northern Ireland (PSNI) has the same notifiable offence list for recorded crime as used in England and Wales. In addition, the PSNI has adopted the National Crime Reporting Standards and Home Office Counting Rules for recorded crime that apply in England and Wales.

Since the Good Friday Agreement was signed in 1998, there has been more low-level crimes being committed, although statistics show that some places in Northern Ireland (outside of Belfast) have some of the lowest crime rates in Western Europe.

Between April 2008 and 2009, there were just over 110,000 crimes recorded by the Police Service of Northern Ireland, an increase of 1.5% on the previous year. As of 2020, Northern Ireland has around 6 873 serving full-time equivalent police positions, and in 2019 had a prison population of 1,448, 83 per 100,000 of the population, lower than the rest of the United Kingdom.

== Crime and culture in Britain ==
=== Real crime stories ===
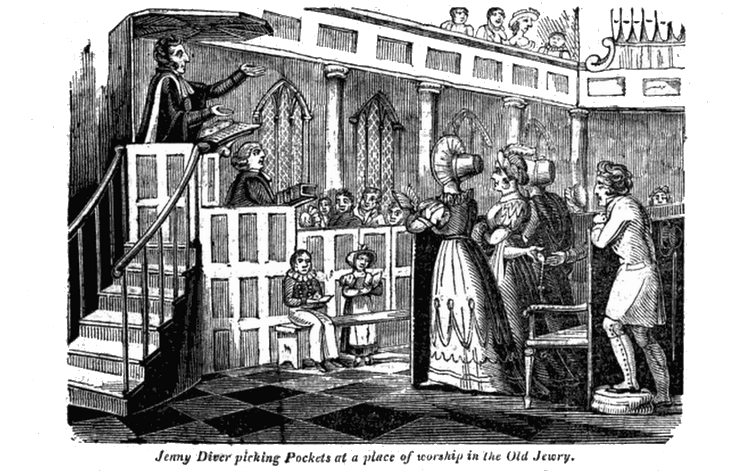
Anonymous engraving from 'The Annals of Crimes and New Newgate Calendar', n°15, 1833

In early modern Britain, real crime stories were a popular form of entertainment. These stories were written about in pamphlets, broadsides, and chapbooks, such as The Newgate Calendar. These real crime stories were the subject of popular gossip and discussion of the day. While only a few people may have been able to attend a trial or an execution, these stories allowed for the entertainment of such events to be extended to a much greater population. These real crime stories depicted the gruesome details of criminal acts, trials and executions with the intent to 'articulate a particular set of values, inculcate a certain behavioral model and bolster a social order perceived as threatened'.

19th-century Victorian detective fiction

The publication of these stories was done in order for the larger population to learn from the mistakes of their fellow citizen. They stressed the idea of learning from others wrongdoings to the extent that they would place warnings within the epitaphs of executed criminals. For example, the epitaph of John Smith, a highway thief and murderer, said:

'thereto remain, a Terrour to affright All wicked Men that do in Sins delight... this is the Reason, and the Cause that they May Warning take.'

The epitaph ends with the Latin phrase Faelix quem faciunt aliena pericula cantum, which means 'fortunate the man who learns caution from the perils of others'.

=== The detective genre ===
The rise of formal police forces in the 19th century shifted the focus from the criminal to the investigator, leading to the birth of detective fiction. What is often called the first detective novel, The Moonstone by Wilkie Collins, was published in 1868. The creation of Sherlock Holmes by Arthur Conan Doyle cemented a cultural shift in which the public fascination moved from the outlaws of 'real crime stories' to the figure who restored order and solved the mystery. This fascination continues today in the forms of crime dramas, true crime podcasts, and news media.

== See also ==
- Child sexual abuse in the United Kingdom
  - Grooming gangs scandal
- Drug policy of the United Kingdom
- Fraud in the United Kingdom
- Race and crime in the United Kingdom
- Gangs in the United Kingdom
- Unsolved murders in the UK
- Major crimes in the United Kingdom
- Terrorism in the United Kingdom
- Sexual offences in the United Kingdom

Regional:

- Crime in Northern Ireland

Cities:

- Crime in Liverpool
- Crime in London
- Gun crime in south Manchester
