= Crime statistics in the United Kingdom =

How data on crime is measured and reported

Comparison of trends in crime statistics between 2002 and 2022.

Crime statistics in the United Kingdom refers to the way crime data is collected and reported in England and Wales, Scotland and Northern Ireland, which each operate separate judicial systems.

For information about UK crime itself, see Crime in the United Kingdom.

The Home Office has historical data on individual offences recorded by the police from 1898. A marked increase starting in the late 1950s and accelerating through to the 1980s led to the question of whether increases were due to changes in how crime was recorded, together with the public's growing willingness to report it. Occasional updates to police counting rules were made in the past, but the first systematic efforts to record crime consistently across all forces in the UK took place in the late 1990s against a backdrop of generally declining crime rates both nationally and around the world.

Today, there are two primary sources of statistics on crime in the UK: Police Recorded Crime (PRC) statistics collected by each regional force, and victim surveys - principally the Crime Survey for England and Wales (CSEW), with data from 1981. The CSEW is considered the preferred source for understanding longer-term crime prevalence and genuine trends across the population, while PRC is used to supplement weaknesses in its methodology for high-harm crimes.

While PRC statistics in England and Wales can be directly compared to those of Northern Ireland, they cannot be compared to that of Scotland due to the way Scottish counting rules operate.

The history of PRC statistics in the UK since the late 1990s is fundamentally that of administrative failure followed by statistical recovery. This created a dramatic, but misleading, apparent increase in police reported crime against a steady decrease in surveyed rates, both in the UK and internationally. In particular, the rise from 2002 and the surge from 4 million recorded crimes in the year ending March 2014 to 6.7 million in 2024 in England and Wales, are overwhelmingly methodological in origin. The sharpest periods of this inflation (2002-2004 and 2015–2019) also correlate directly with efforts to enforce data quality and police compliance. Since 2014, while police-reported crime statistics are no longer officially 'national statistics', efforts to bring them up to a sufficient quality to be so are on-going.

Recent changes in police reporting have also depressed positive outcome statistics as crime volumes have risen, compounding a generally negative popular perception of crime rates. Reporting improvements and changes also make direct international comparisons of crime volumes unreliable, particularly for non-homicide violent crime.

== Measurement and publication ==
=== Modern police recorded crime statistics ===
An important distinction within police-recorded crime in the UK is made between 'notifiable offences' recorded according to the National Crime Recording Standard (NCRS), and police 'incidents' (non-crime). Incidents are recorded according to the National Standard for Incident Recording (NSIR) standards using the 'National Incident Category List' to provide uniformity about how the police record an incident and an opportunity to find any incidents that require recording as a notifiable offence. In 2011, 80% of calls to the police were about incidents specified on the 'National Incident Category List'.

Notifiable offences constitute official police crime statistics, while non-crime incidents are primarily used internally by police for the purposes of resource allocation, intelligence or local reporting. Incidents are also not to be confused with 'recordable offences', of which the police must keep records of the conviction/offender on the Police National Computer (PNC). However, while offences can be recordable, they may also not be notifiable. If so, they are excluded from official crime statistics. Police forces in the UK record large amounts of information internally, which often includes incidents that are not classified as either notifiable offences or recordable offences.

==== England and Wales ====
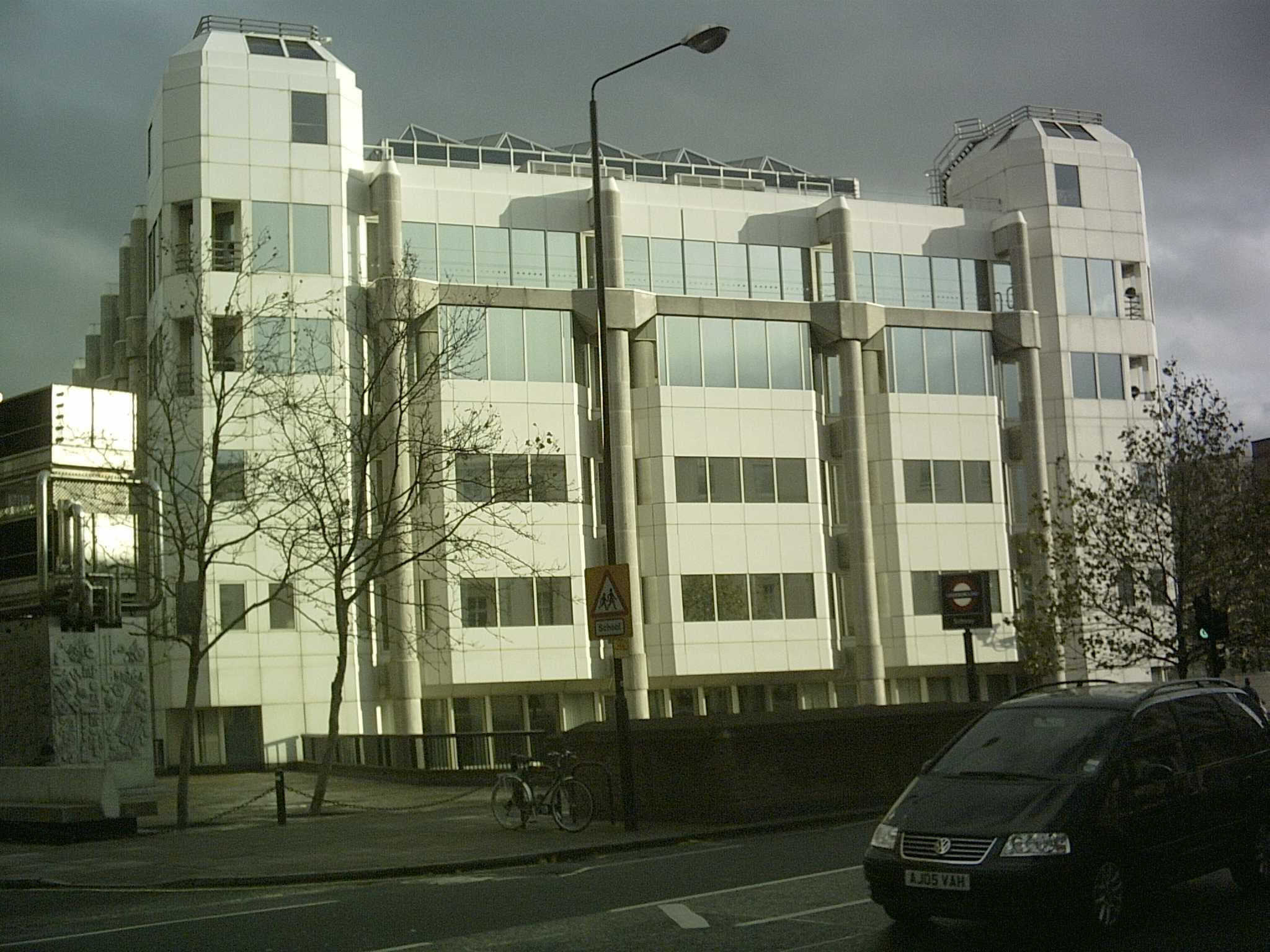
Office for National Statistics main building, Drummond Gate, London SW1.

The Office of National Statistics (ONS) is the primary body responsible for publishing crime statistics for England and Wales, using data from both police reported crime and the Crime Survey for England and Wales (CSEW).

The Home Office is responsible for collecting and validating police recorded crime data from the 43 territorial police forces of England and Wales and the British Transport Police, and supplies this data to the ONS for compilation and publication.

Three other independent bodies are involved in regulation and quality assurance: His Majesty's Inspectorate of Constabulary and Fire & Rescue Services (HMICFRS) inspects the integrity of police recorded crime data for forces in England and Wales, auditing it with the National Crime Recording Standard (NCRS) and National Incident Recording Standard (NIRS). The UK Statistics Authority (UKSA) and Office for Statistics Regulation (OSR) are responsible for promoting and safeguarding the production and publication of official statistics. The OSR also assesses whether statistics meet the standards of the Code of Practice for Statistics, which determines if they can be designated as National Statistics.

In recent years, crime statistics have been made available online in various ways, for example through the Policing Services and Information website, and the London Metropolitan Polices Stats and Data website. Various third party sites that analyse and re-publish these figures are also available.

==== Scotland and Northern Ireland ====
Scots criminal law was unique in the world from 1728 until 1 January 2026 in having a third verdict in addition to a ‘guilty’ and ‘not guilty’ - a not proven verdict that was also an acquittal. The list of offences in Scotland is also different from England and Wales, and in Northern Ireland.

Crime statistics are collected and published separately by their respective government bodies (the Scottish Government and Department of Justice in Northern Ireland), though they are also official statistics for those nations.

=== Crime surveys ===
==== England and Wales ====
Since 1982, the Crime Survey for England and Wales (CSEW) is an attempt to measure both the amount of crime and the impact of crime on England and Wales. These surveys collect information about the victims of crime, the circumstances surrounding the offence and the behaviour of the perpetrators. They are used to plan and measure the results of crime reduction or perception measures. In addition, they collect data about the perception of issues such as antisocial behaviour and the criminal justice system.

Other crime surveys include the Commercial Victimisation Survey, which covers small and medium-sized businesses, and the Offending, Crime and Justice Survey, with a particular focus on young people.

===== Limitations =====
Unlike police-reported crime in the UK, the methodology of the CSEW has remained largely unchanged since its inception in 1982. The Office for National Statistics (ONS) therefore regards it as the most reliable source of long-term trend information. However, it fails to capture 'high-harm' crime effectively. This is because such crimes (e.g., gun crime, attempted murder) occur relatively infrequently compared to theft or burglary, thereby producing an insufficient sample size. The methodology of the survey also prevents it from capturing certain other categories such as homicide, since the victim cannot be interviewed, and so-called 'victimless' crimes such as drug or weapon possession, are not covered. This data therefore comes exclusively from the police.

The CSEW does not include non-household populations (approximately 1.7% of the population in England and Wales according to Census 2021), so excludes all victims living in care homes, prisons, student halls of residence, or the homeless - groups which likely experience crime differently from the household population. The CSEW has also not surveyed fraud and computer misuse before 2017, which may comprise as much as 40% of all crime in the UK as of 2025. It is also thought that both the youth and the adult surveys do not distinguish between crimes not reported to the police because they thought the police would do nothing, or crimes not reported to the police because the victim thought them too trivial.

Until 2019, the survey restricted victims' reports of the same crime by the same person and same victim to a maximum of five. The ONS argued that this 'cap' prevented a small number of victims distorting the statistics. In 2007, a report into the survey's methodology estimated that this resulted in an 82% increase in crime from that reported in the year of the study, although it would not necessarily affect overall trends. In 2010, the existence of the cap was also blamed for the inability of the survey to take proper account of crimes such as domestic violence, figures for which would allegedly be 140% higher without it. In 2015, a similar study found that domestic violence against women rose by as much as 70% if the cap was removed.

In response to these criticisms on the five report limit, the ONS greatly increased this - setting it to a 98th percentile figure with all historic data revised to the new methodology in 2019. It cautioned that while this did not affect the overall trends, it did produce a small effect on the absolute numbers, with increases in violent offence types between 6.4% and 31.6%. This was due to repeat incidents being more common for those crimes.

In 2022, there was a temporary suspension of national statistics status for the data from the CSEW, primarily due to concerns about low response rates for face-to-face interviews. This led to several improvements in the way the survey was published, as well as leading to the introduction of a part of the survey in which respondents completed their own description of their experiences in order to better record domestic and related crimes.

=== Scotland and Northern Ireland ===
Police recorded crime statistics in Scotland are collected according to Scots law on the basis of the Scottish Crime Recording Standard (SCRS), introduced in 2004. Crime statistics for England and Wales are not directly comparable with those in Scotland due to the SCRS following a practice called 'subsuming.' This generally means a single incident can be recorded as multiple crimes if different crimes occurred during a continuous action. In England and Wales, only the most serious crime is counted for statistical purposes (known as the "Principal Crime Rule").

The practice of 'subsuming', and other differences between the SCRS and the NCRS means crime statistics between Scotland and England and Wales are not directly comparable.

The legal system in Northern Ireland is based on that of England and Wales, and the Police Service for Northern Ireland (PSNI) has the same notifiable offence list for recorded crime as used in England and Wales. In addition, the PSNI has adopted the National Crime Reporting Standards and Home Office Counting Rules for recorded crime that apply in England and Wales.

The Scottish Crime and Justice Survey and Northern Ireland Crime Survey have similar purposes to the CSEW.

=== Other sources of data ===
Various sources of supplementary data on crime and crime outcomes are also available. These are used to compare, validate and predict trends in various types of crime.

Examples include NHS admissions data for 'sharp objects', using the ICD-10 cause code X99 for 'assault by sharp object", recorded since 2017. This is compiled from Finished Admission Episodes (FAEs) within NHS hospitals in England and Wales, and is broken down by age group, gender, police force, and ethnicity. These figures are often quoted by the ONS in relation to statistics on knife crime.

Police outcomes can be analysed from criminal justice statistics to see how police deal with crimes, such as with arrests, cautions, and other out-of-court disposals. Data is collected on defendants prosecuted, offenders convicted, and remand decisions as well as the types of sentences handed out by courts.

Specialist agencies also gather information on specific areas of crime. For example, the National Fraud Intelligence Bureau (NFIB) collates fraud data from Report Fraud (the national fraud reporting centre that records incidents of fraud directly from the public and organisations), Cifas (a UK-wide fraud and financial crime prevention service) and UK Finance (which collects information on fraud from the card payments industry in the UK).

== History of changes to counting rules ==
=== Overview ===
There have been distinct phases of discontinuity in police recorded crime statistics in the UK:

1. 1898 to twentieth century - Reliant mainly on reports by the public, with variations between regional forces using occasionally updated but poorly-enforced counting rules.
2. 1950s onwards - Marked increases in crime accelerating through subsequent decades, leading to questions about these rises and the establishment of the Birish Crime Survey (now the Crime Survey for England and Wales) in 1982.
3. 1998 - A review of counting rules provided greater guidance on crime recording, which in turn produced a rise in the number of many offences while trends in the CSEW moved consistently downward.
4. 2002 - Introduction of the National Crime Recording Standard (NCRS): This mandatory introduction of victim-centric recording created a discrete step-change, initially estimated at 23% inflation for violence categories.
5. 2015 - 2019 integrity correction: The longest and largest period of inflation; the loss of 'national statistics' accreditation and the ensuing mandatory police compliance following the exposure of 20% institutional under-recording.
6. 2020 onwards - Continuous, granular adjustments to counting rules bringing about both inflation and deflation within specific categories, tending to mask a stable underlying prevalence.

=== History ===
Recorded offences per 100,000 people in England and Wales during the twentieth century.

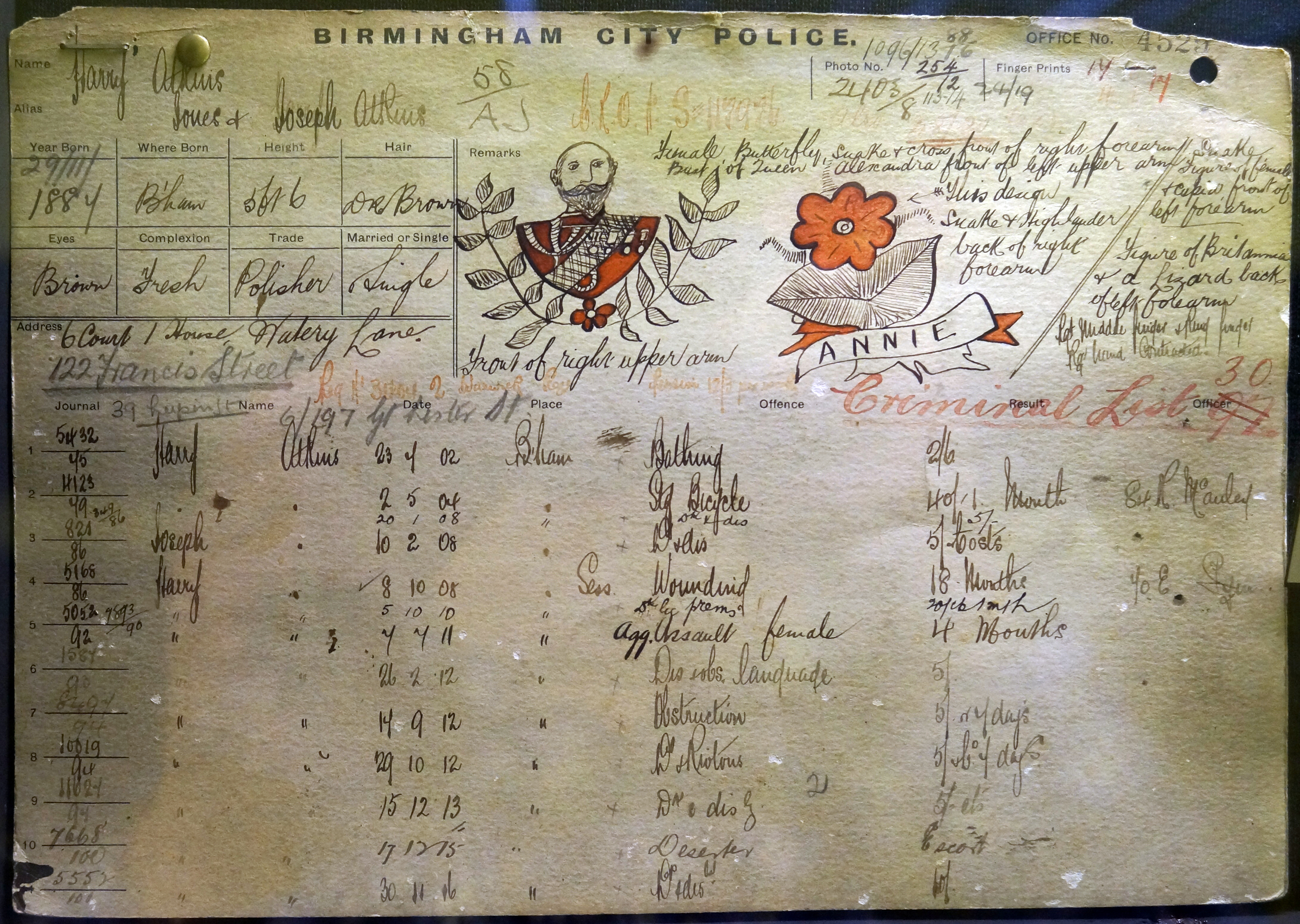
A criminal record card showing drawings of tattoos. Birmingham City Police, West Midlands Police Museum, c.1910.

See also Timeline

For the first half of the twentieth century, official crime statistics in England and Wales were low. During the first two decades of the century, police recorded an average of only 90,000 indictable offences each year - approximately 250 crimes per 100,000 people in 1901. Officers had considerable autonomy, having originally been given discretion in whether they thought a crime had been committed or not. Crime later began a steep rise, with an average of over one million crimes recorded each year in the 1960s, increasing to two million during the 1970s, and 3.5m in the 1980s.

Various factors contributed to the increases: changes to the types of offences recorded as crime, how they were counted, the behaviour of the public in reporting crimes to the police, and social change. For example, the relatively recent need to inform the police in order to make an insurance claim for burglary; new technologies creating new opportunities for misdemeanours; a growth in the value of ordinary people's personal property, and the criminalisation of drug use.

Since the Victorian era, offences have been rooted in statutes, such as the Offences against the Person Act 1861, which defined the categories of serious crime that formed the basis of the national statistical series. But counting rules themselves were not sufficiently detailed, and there was a lack of consistency. Little distinction was made between similar types of crimes, and few examples available to illustrate how the rules should be implemented. This could result in the same offence being recorded as a different crime within and between police forces. Prior to 1998, there was also no policy on new and changing offence types introduced through new legislation.

Because of its severity, homicide receives consistent recording across all jurisdictions and time periods, thereby minimising officer discretion. But throughout the period of late twentieth century rises, homicide did not show the same degree of increase (roughly 156% from 1960 compared to over 450% for aggregated crime).

Recorded homicides per 100,000 people in England and Wales 1898 - 1997.

By the late 1970s and early 1980s, the unreliability of police-recorded crime statistics had evolved into an institutional crisis within the Home Office. The government response was to create a parallel statistical measure independent of law enforcement activity. The launch of the first British Crime Survey (BCS) launched in 1982 (later the Crime Survey for England and Wales) was explicitly aimed at addressing this acknowledged 'crisis' in official statistics. By 1998, data from the BCS suggested that the police received reports for less than half of all offences that occurred.

==== The National Crime Recording Standard ====
The Home Office Counting Rules (HOCR) had existed in some form since the 1920s, with processes for determining how police forces record notifiable offence statistics. Until the late 1990s, crime figures for varying crime types were not released to the general public at individual police force level. The annual publication 'Crime in England & Wales' produced by the Home Office began to break the figures down to a smaller area in 1996.

Following the 1997 General Election, a review of crime statistics promised by the then Labour government led to significant changes in crime counting rules and coverage. Taking effect from 1 April 1998, these changes immediately resulted in a 14% increase in recorded offences overall, albeit it with a very uneven effect on classifications. Together with a move from the calendar year to the financial year, these reforms created the first major discontinuity in the PRC time series in recent history.

Estimated effect of April 1998 rule changes
Offence group	Increase
Violence against the person	118%
Sexual offences	4%
Robbery	1%
Burglary	0.1%
All theft & handling	3%
Fraud and forgery	61%
Criminal damage	5%
Drug offences	538%
Other offences	52%

The introduction of the National Crime Recording Standards (England and Wales) (NCRS) in April 2002 marked the first major improvement in the consistency of crime recording across all 43 police forces in England and Wales, and is the reason crime figures before and after that date are generally not directly comparable.

One issue subsequently identified was 'no-criming' ('cancellations') - the practice of writing off reported notifiable offences from police force statistics as it appeared the NCRS was also applied inconsistently across crimes and regions, and frequently incorrectly: in the year to March 2011, 2% of reported rapes in Gloucestershire were recorded as 'no crime', while 30% of reported rapes in Kent were so classified. This was sometimes due to pressure from performance and other factors.

During the period November 2012 - October 2013, an average of 19% of crimes reported to the police were not recorded. (Note: There are five reasons for no-criming: the notifiable offence passed to another police force that had jurisdiction for investigation and recording; verifiable information existed that a notifiable offence was not committed; a duplicate record existed of a notifiable offence; a notifiable offence was recorded in error; or an assault when evidence shows it was committed in self-defence.) One quarter of sexual crimes and one-third of violent crimes were ignored by police, with rape being particularly affected with 37% designated as 'no-crime'. Reporting was also inconsistent across local forces. The failure to properly record crime was called 'inexcusably poor' and 'indefensible' by Her Majesty's Chief Inspector of Constabulary Tom Winsor. 20% of reviewed decisions to cancel a report were found to be incorrect, and in about a quarter of cases there was no record of victims being informed that their report had been cancelled. Senior members of the policing establishment admitted to long-term, widespread 'fiddling' of figures, such as John Stevens, former head of the Metropolitan Police Service:

'Ever since I’ve been in police service there has been a fiddling of figures. I remember being a detective constable where we used to write off crimes'

A sharp increase in sex crimes from Oct 2012 marks the start of Operation Yewtree, following the highly publicised Jimmy Savile investigations and an increased willingness of victims to come forward.

In April 2013, the framework for reporting of official police statistics was amended to address these issues. The Home Office delegated the responsibility for auditing a police force's compliance with the National Crime Recording Standard (NCRS) to Her Majesty's Chief Inspectorate of Constabulary, later renamed Her Majesty's Inspectorate of Constabulary and Fire Rescue Service (HMICFRS). The first statistics using the new framework were published in July 2014.

The NCRS mandated that if a victim reported an incident and a police officer, based on the balance of probability, believed a crime had occurred, it must be recorded. This lowered the recording threshold, particularly for violent crime and especially assaults. Police began recording many minor or common assaults (violence with minimal or no injury) that had previously been screened out. This created a large increase in the recorded rate for 'violence against the person.' Recording of sexual assault and rape also improved significantly.

An initial analysis estimated the effect of these changes was an increase of 23% in 'violence against the person' offences in the first 12 months of implementation. While this figure suggested a very large increase in violence, detailed analysis indicated that once recording changes were accounted for, the genuine underlying increase in police recorded violence in that period was approximately 2%.

==== The National Standard for Incident Recording ====
'Notifiable offences' constitute official police crime statistics, while non-crime 'incidents' are primarily used internally by police for the purposes of resource allocation, intelligence or local reporting. Incidents are recorded according to the National Standard for Incident Recording (NSIR) standards. (Note: The five purposes for the NSIR are to provide uniformity about how the police record an incident; to ensure the correct response to an incident reported to the police; to allow a risk assessment about the incident, particularly considering any threats to safety, identifying vulnerable people, and repeat victims; an opportunity to find any incidents that required recording as a notifiable offence, and to provide management and performance data for use at both a local and national level.) Many incidents reported to the police (like noise complaints or lost property) are not crimes and therefore will never become a notifiable offence, but others may be determined to be crimes later on.

In 2012, Her Majesty's Inspectorate of Constabulary audited several police forces about how they recorded incidents and reported that they lacked consistency. It was concerned about the adequacy and quality of the data, especially in identifying vulnerable and repeat victims, particularly in relation to anti-social behaviour incidents.

HMICFRS annually complete a ‘PEEL Assessment’ for each English and Welsh police force. The assessment reviews a force's effectiveness, efficiency, and legitimacy. Each force is graded either as either outstanding, good, requires improvement, or inadequate. The NSIR are still used, but how it complies with the aims of the standards are incorporated into the PEEL Assessment, by for example, how it uses information to identify repeat victims, vulnerable people, and to improve the management and performance by the police force.

==== 2015 - 2019 integrity correction ====
A second significant, but more gradual inflation in police recorded crime numbers occurred following an official inspection and highly critical report by HMICFRS on the integrity of police crime recording in 2014. The report found that an estimated 19% of reported notifiable offences were still not being recorded correctly. This led to a subsequent (and ongoing) drive to improve compliance with the NCRS principles. As forces corrected previous under-recording errors, a further sharp increase in recorded crime occurred from around 2014 onwards, particularly for high-volume crimes like violence and sexual offences. The total volume of recorded crime then rose form from 4 million in March 2014 to 6.7 million by 2024.

Surveyed and PRC numbers diverged in the year ending March 2015, while non-violent PRC can be seen mostly to follow the surveyed trend.

The period between 2015 and 2019 marks the most significant analytical divergence between the two key statistical series of PRC and victim surveyed trends. The Crime Survey for England and Wales (CSEW) generally continued to show a decrease in overall crime prevalence, while the police-recorded crime series saw sharp rises with volumes eventually surpassing the number of reported CSEW incidents.

The official analysis confirms this apparent crime rise was predominantly the statistical effect of improved police recording practices, recovering the historical backlog identified by HMICFRS. Further supporting this conclusion is the finding that when violence with and without injury offences (the categories most affected by under-recording) are removed from both series, the police-recorded crime trends show similarity with the CSEW trends. This indicates that the majority of the apparent surge in crime figures during this decade was concentrated in the statistical recovery of historically mismanaged, high-harm reports, particularly violence against the person and sexual offences. It is also thought that growing awareness by the police of what constitutes hate crime has also led to improved identification of such offences by officers. Because of these changes, police recorded crime figures do not provide reliable trends in hate crime from 2014.

In 2017, the CSEW began estimating the prevalence of fraud and computer misuse. This include bank and credit card fraud, advance fee fraud, consumer and retail fraud, and similar offences in addition to ‘unauthorised access to personal information’ (including hacking) and ‘computer viruses’. The additional data has produced a large increase in the UK's headline crime figure, and in 2022 fraud accounted for 41% of all crimes committed in England and Wales.

==== 2020 onwards ====
In 2023, the standardisation of the Principal Offence Rule (POR), implemented as part of changes to the Home Office Counting Rules (HOCR), had several effects largely aimed at reducing police bureaucracy and refocusing on the most serious crimes. Before 2018, if a crime of stalking or harassment was involved, this would also be recorded in addition to the most serious crime. The 2023 change reintroduced the principal crime rule for all offences (except for modern slavery offences and passport application fraud).

The POR means that when a victim reports a single incident that involves multiple different crimes, police now only record the 'principal offence,' which is defined as the crime with the most significant impact on the victim. In addition, there is the Finished Incident Rule in the HOCR. This rule states that:

'an incident comprising a sequence of crimes between the same offender (or group of offenders) and the same victim should be counted as one crime if reported to the police all at once'.

However, in Scotland, where individual dates and times are known or where a different location of the same crime is identified, separate crimes will be recorded.

The effects of these changes raised significant concerns, particularly from the Domestic Abuse Commissioner, that the rules masked the true extent and nature of repeated or multiple offences. This is especially true in cases like domestic abuse, which often involve a series of crimes (e.g., harassment, common assault, criminal damage) during a single incident. For example, the Office for National Statistics noted a 6.6% decrease compared with the previous year in domestic abuse-related crimes in England and Wales for the year ending March 2024.

In 2024, the Office for Statistics Regulation published a review of findings regarding the quality of police statistics following their withdrawal of accreditation in 2014. They found a positive shift in the culture around crime recording, with forces appearing to take crime data integrity seriously, and being more committed to ensuring it met national standards. However, challenges remained relating to the complexity of reporting and frequency of changes made to it, with some reports of over-counting out of caution that a force might be found to be in breach of the rules.

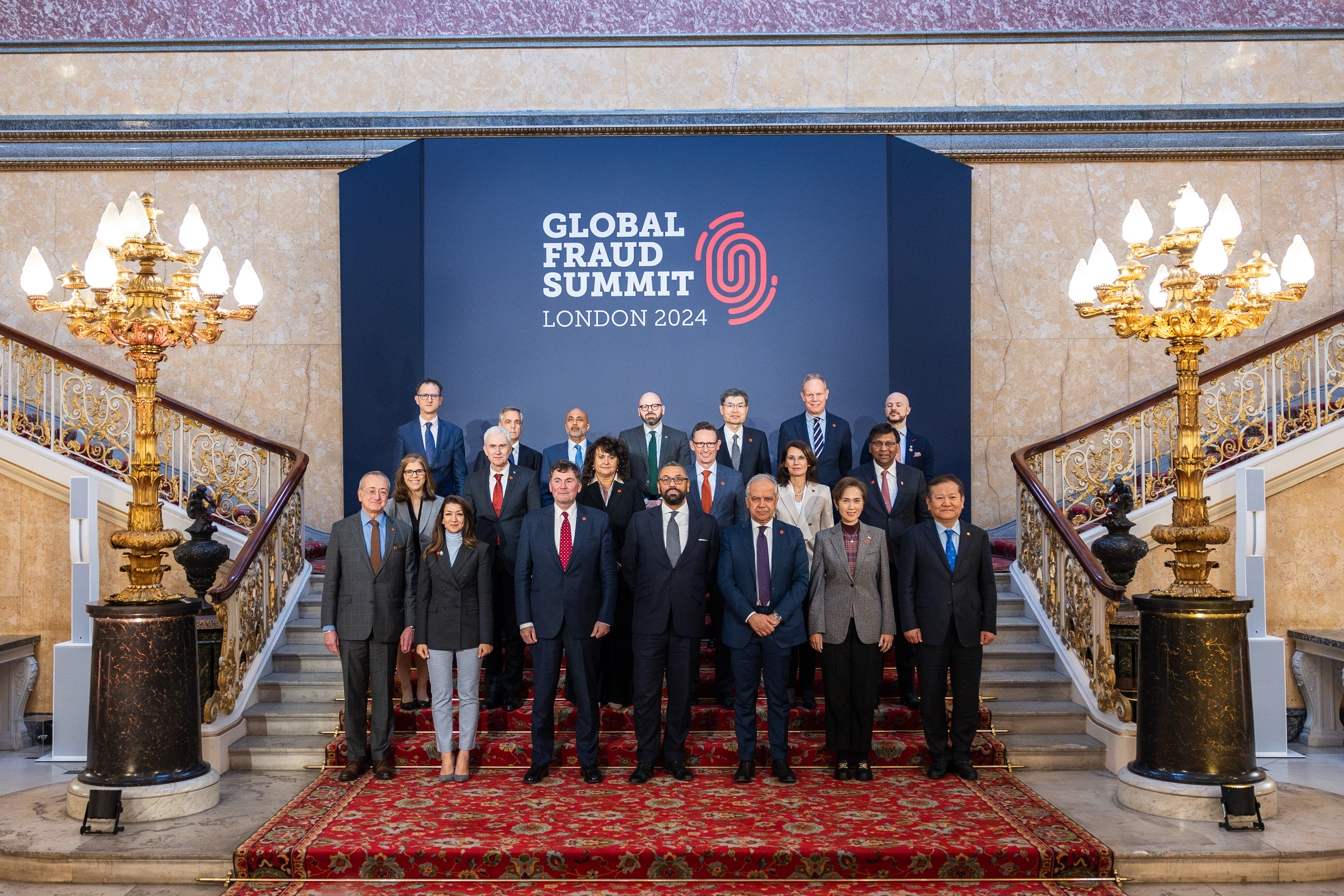
UK Home Secretary James Cleverly hosts the first Global Fraud Summit at Lancaster House, London November 2024.

Following widespread criticisms of the performance of the National Fraud Intelligence Bureau's (NFIB) Action Fraud service the City of London Police has replaced this with Report Fraud in 2025. This £212 million transformation programme is expected to 'significantly impact' the way fraud and computer misuse crimes are recorded and how data quality is managed. Given that this new implementation is a multi-year programme requiring cooperation between the ONS, Home Office, and police forces to understand its impact, it is expected that there will be challenges with the coherence of data sources relating to cyber crime. As of 2023, fraud is estimated to comprise about 40% of all crime reported in the UK.

=== Wider effects of changes ===
==== Outcome rates and detection ====
From 2015, police forces have published monthly 'positive outcome' rates (a somewhat wider definition from the previous 'sanction detection' rates) for offenders receiving some formal sanction such as being charged or summonsed. These include charges, but also outcomes such as Penalty Notices for Disorder (PNDs), warnings for cannabis possession, offences that are asked to be taken into consideration by a court (TICs), cautions, and other warnings and reprimands.

Nationally, detection rates have been falling as police-reported crime has been rising. In 2024, there was even a zero detection rate for crimes within 166 neighborhood areas under the responsibility of the Metropolitan Police Service (MPS). More generally, positive outcome rates for the MPS were just 7.3% on average, with some crimes (criminal damage and offences against vehicles) as low as 0.9% in 2022/2023, while drug offences had a 38% detection rate. Corresponding figures for 2010/2011 were far higher, with an average total of 24%.

However, an increase in crimes reported means the same volume of detections is therefore divided by a much larger number of total recorded offences. While this does not fully explain the drop in detection rates, it is thought to have contributed to it. Other reasons include lack of police resources and that the crimes the police record disproportionately affect those offences which (in law, if not by the public) are treated as the least serious.

==== In the media ====
From 1998 and particularly from 2002, the impact of the changes were followed by regular reports in the media about rising crime, particularly in terms of figures for 'violence against the person'. (Note: List of media articles covering rises in crime rates:) Responding to growing public concern, Home Secretary Sajid Javid called on the Government to convene an urgent COBR meeting to discuss the 'national emergency' in serious violence. However, there were concerns that sensationalised media coverage and political rhetoric had failed to take account of the methodological issues that had produced the rises.

==== International comparisons ====
The UK's reporting standards are not the same as those in other countries, making international comparisons for most crimes problematic. One example is data from the United Nations Office on Drugs and Crime (UNODC) showing the rate of rape per 100,000 population in England and Wales between 2012 and 2022 increasing from 28.95 to 117.30 (~305%), sexual assault from 39.54 to 125.88 (~218%), and sexual violence from 81.53 to 324.79 (~298%). These figures were almost double the crime rate of the next highest country in those categories among all UN member states in the European region. However, the UNODC frequently cautions that comparisons of recorded crime rates (especially for non-fatal crimes like assault) are heavily affected by different national legal definitions and varying counting and recording rules.

== Declining rates of crime since 1995 ==
After initial rises in compiled crime data seen by the Office for National Statistics from the Crime Survey for England and Wales (CSEW) starting from 1981, trends in most crime began to go steadily downward from 1995. All high-income countries have experienced similar trends. There is scientific consensus that the decline in crime is driven by various factors including better physical security, new technology such as CCTV and tracking methods, and perhaps even environmental factors.

Despite this, as of late 2025 over 65% of Britons surveyed think the rate of crime has gone up over time. Possible reasons for this include media sensationalisation and political rhetoric about emotive but correspondingly rare crimes such as stabbings, terrorism and murder.

== Timeline of events ==
As UK crime and law enforcement evolve, changes in reporting methods and systems are ongoing. This table lists key events in the history of Police Recorded Crime (PRC) in England and Wales from 1998 to the present.

Date/Period	Change/Regulation	Impact	Significance
1898 - 1982	PRC recording practices conceled the true baseline of crime rates, leading the creation of the British Crime Survey	An external means of recording the impact of crime, independent of police activity.	Empirically quantified the scale of the 'dark figure', confirming the institutional crisis in police data.
April 1998	Significant changes to Home Office Counting Rules (HOCR)	An immediate (14%) increase in recorded offences overall.	Established a new, slightly higher statistical baseline post-1997 review.
April 2002	National Crime Recording Standard (NCRS) implemented	Estimated 23% uplift in 'Violence Against the Person' in the first 12 months.	The first major mandatory inflation based on victim-centric recording standards.
2012	Operation Yewtree launched	Increase in reported sexual abuse and related offences.	A cultural shift leading to more victims coming forward.
2014	UK Statistics Authority (UKSA) removes 'National Statistics' designation after HMICFRS report into PRC failures.	Signalled severe data integrity failure and prompted urgent compliance correction.	Established the largest phase of apparent crime rise (2015–2019) due to forced compliance.
2015 - 2019	Improved police compliance (Post-HMICFRS findings)	Significant surge in recorded crime, estimated to recover 1 in 5 previously unrecorded offences.	Confirmed as the primary driver of divergency of police-reported crime from CSEW trends.
Post-2023	Standardisation of the Principal Offence/Crime Rule (POR) (Note: Modern slavery offences and passport application fraud are exempt from this rule. "National standard for incident recording counting rules". GOV.UK.)	Causes complex shifts: domestic abuse crimes decreased (-6.6% YE March 2024), while Stalking/Harassment increased.	Demonstrates administrative rules can cause apparent decreases in recorded volumes.
2025 (Expected)	Replacement of Action Fraud with Report Fraud	Expected to create a significant new discontinuity in fraud and cyber crime statistics.	Forecasted instability; current high recorded fraud figures (up 104% referred).

== Comparative reliability of offence types ==
While the Crime Survey for England and Wales (CSEW) is regarded as the best source of crime trends over the long term, it is not recommended for the comparison of some crime types, particularly high-harm offences which do not occur enough to be covered properly by a victim survey . The ONS gives the reliability of trend data for each crime type, classed as 'good', 'moderate' or 'poor', together with the preferred source. However, with the exception of homicide, the strength of police recorded (PRC) sources should also be taken into account when making comparisons over time.

Crime type	Comparison possible from	Notes	Preferred source / rating
Homicide	1960s (approx)	Generally stable and reliable over the long term. Also directly comparable internationally.	PRC / good
Robbery	April 2002	National Crime Recording Standard (NCRS) created a consistent baseline for this specific offence.	PRC / good
Knife Crime	April 2019 / 2020	New recording methodology (NDQIS) introduced in 2020. Data prior to this often incomparable due to poor 'tagging' of knives in police systems. NHS admissions data available from 2017.	PRC / moderate
Sexual Offences	Caution advised	From 2002, but previous years affected by low sample sizes; some years will have large margins of error. (See chart).	CSEW / moderate
Burglary (household)	April 2002	Like robbery, reasonably well-recorded since the NCRS introduction, though definitions changed slightly in 2017.	CSEW / good
Domestic Abuse	April 2023 / 2025	New 'self completion module' introduced by CSEW from 2023. Full coverage from 2025. Not yet included in CSEW headline measures.	CSEW / -
Fraud	Subcategory dependent	CSEW good from March 2017 for computer misuse and crimes gainst individuals / households. Poor for crimes against state and business.	-
Hate & race hate	1988 for CSEW only	Question on racial motivation added to CSEW 1988. Common definitions agreed across criminal justice system in 2007. PRC figures do not provide reliable trends from 2014.	PRC + CSEW (Note: The CSEW combines three annual datasets to provide a larger sample for a more robust estimates for hate crime, with trends published every three years. (ibid.))

== See also ==
- Police National Computer
- Office for National Statistics
- Crime in the United Kingdom
- Crime drop
- Dark figure of crime
- Criminology
- Criminal record
