= Crime Survey for England and Wales =

Theft and sub-categories over time. Robbery offences among victims under 16 years are not recorded.

The Crime Survey for England and Wales (CSEW) (previously called the British Crime Survey) is a systematic victim study established in 1982 (with data from 1981). It is currently carried out by Verian (formally known as Kantar Public) on behalf of the Office for National Statistics (ONS) and curated by the UK Data Service. The survey is comparable to the National Crime Victimization Survey conducted in the United States.

The CSEW seeks to measure the amount of crime, as well as victims' experiece of it, in England and Wales by face-to-face surveys of around 31,000 people aged 16 or over, and 1,500 children aged 10 to 15 years. The survey only covers those living in private households.

The Children's Crime Survey for England and Wales (CCSEW) was established in January 2009 when the main survey was expanded to include interviews with children aged 10 to 15. This was further expanded in 2023 to include more information on child victimisation.

The CSEW is one of two main sources of crime statistics in the UK, providing a parallel measure to police-recorded crime (PRC) stastistics. While the surveys have been criticised for methodological deficiencies, the Office for National Statistics (ONS) regards the CSEW as the most reliable source of long-term trends in crime. However, due to the low sample rate for less common (particularly violent) crimes, the ONS supplements its published statistics on these with police-reported crime figures.

== History ==
By the late 1970s and early 1980s, the unreliability of police-recorded crime statistics in the UK had evolved into an institutional crisis within the Home Office. The government response was to create a parallel statistical measure independent of law enforcement activity. The first British Crime Survey (BCS) launched in 1982 and was explicitly aimed at addressing this acknowledged 'crisis' in official statistics. By 1998, data from the BCS suggested that the police received reports for less than half of all offences that occurred.

The main purpose of the survey was to estimate the numbers of victims of crime independently of police figures, describing the circumstances under which people become victims, and the consequences of crime for victims. This provided background information on fear of crime and on the public's contact with the police. Around 31,000 respondents a year are now asked whether they or their households have been victims of relevant crimes, and then asked a series of detailed questions about that. Basic demographic information is also recorded, along with data about lifestyle and self-reported offending.

After the first survey in 1982, further surveys took place roughly every four years. From April 2001, BCS interviews were then carried out on a continuous basis. Detailed results are now reported by financial years, with headline measures updated quarterly based on interviews conducted in the previous 12 months.

The Scottish Government commissioned a bespoke survey of victimisation in Scotland called the Scottish Crime and Victimisation Survey (SCVS). As a result, the British Crime Survey was renamed the Crime Survey for England and Wales in 2012 to reflect this. Since 1994 there has also been a separate Northern Ireland Crime Survey, conducted on a biennial basis from 2001, and continuously from January 2005. It is produced by the Statistics and Research Branch of the Northern Ireland Office and broadly comparable to its counterpart in England and Wales.

=== Covid-19 and the TCSEW ===
In March 2020, to avoid a gap in national crime statistics, the Telephone Crime Survey for England and Wales (TCSEW) was introduced as a temporary, telephone-based implementation of the survey created specifically to continue measuring crime during the COVID-19 pandemic. The ONS warned that estimates from the two surveys were not directly comparable, although subsequent analysis showed that there were no statistically significant differences in estimates for most headline crime types. The TCSEW was officially closed in March 2022. However, the ONS has since integrated some telephone elements of the design to make the survey more resilient and cost-effective for future years.

Robbery offences for victims under 16 years not recorded. 2021 and 2022 not available due to suspension of face-to-face interviewing. View source data.

== Limitations ==
Unlike police-reported crime in the UK, the methodology of the CSEW has remained largely unchanged since its inception in 1982. The Office for National Statistics (ONS) therefore regards it as the most reliable source of long-term trend information. However, it fails to capture 'high-harm' crime effectively. This is because such crimes (e.g., gun crime, attempted murder) occur relatively infrequently compared to theft or burglary, thereby producing an insufficient sample size. The methodology of the survey also prevents it from capturing certain other categories such as homicide, since the victim cannot be interviewed, and so-called 'victimless' crimes such as drug or weapon possession, are not covered. This data therefore comes exclusively from the police.

The CSEW does not include non-household populations (approximately 1.7% of the population in England and Wales according to Census 2021), so excludes all victims living in care homes, prisons, student halls of residence, or the homeless - groups which likely experience crime differently from the household population. The CSEW has also not surveyed fraud and computer misuse before 2017, which may comprise as much as 40% of all crime in the UK as of 2025. It is also thought that both the youth and the adult surveys do not distinguish between crimes not reported to the police because they thought the police would do nothing, or crimes not reported to the police because the victim thought them too trivial.

Until 2019, the survey restricted victims' reports of the same crime by the same person and same victim to a maximum of five. The ONS argued that this 'cap' prevented a small number of victims distorting the statistics. In 2007, a report into the survey's methodology estimated that this resulted in an 82% increase in crime from that reported in the year of the study, although it would not necessarily affect overall trends. In 2010, the existence of the cap was also blamed for the inability of the survey to take proper account of crimes such as domestic violence, figures for which would allegedly be 140% higher without it. In 2015, a similar study found that domestic violence against women rose by as much as 70% if the cap was removed.

In response to these criticisms on the five report limit, the ONS greatly increased this - setting it to a 98th percentile figure with all historic data revised to the new methodology in 2019. It cautioned that while this did not affect the overall trends, it did produce a small effect on the absolute numbers, with increases in violent offence types between 6.4% and 31.6%. This was due to repeat incidents being more common for those crimes.

In 2022, there was a temporary suspension of national statistics status for the data from the CSEW, primarily due to concerns about low response rates for face-to-face interviews. This led to several improvements in the way the survey was published, as well as leading to the introduction of a part of the survey in which respondents completed their own description of their experiences in order to better record domestic and related crimes.

== Data access ==
Data from the survey can be downloaded for research and teaching use via the UK Data Service website. Datasets since 1982 are available under a standard End User Licence; in addition, certain data from the Crime Survey (1996 to present) are subject to the more restrictive Special Licence or Secure Access conditions. There are also bespoke versions of the survey data available for teaching purposes.

== See also ==
- Crime in the United Kingdom
- Crime statistics in the United Kingdom
- Policing in the United Kingdom
- British Social Attitudes Survey
- Social Trends (UK)

General:

- Crime statistics
- Criminology
- Dark figure of crime
- Self report study
- International Crime Victims Survey
- Victim study
