= Recordable offence =

Offence that must be recorded on the Police National Computer in England and Wales

A recordable offence is any offence in England and Wales where the police must keep records of convictions and offenders on the Police National Computer.

== Legislation ==
The power for police to keep such records is contained in the National Police Records (Recordable Offences) Regulations 2000. This states that a 'crime recordable offence' is an offence which must be recorded as a conviction on the PNC.

Recordable offences include any offence punishable by imprisonment, plus at least 50 non-imprisonable offences, such as:

- nuisance communications (phone calls, letters)
- tampering with motor vehicles
- firearms, air weapons, knives
- football offences
- causing harm or danger to children
- drunkenness
- poaching
- failing to provide a specimen of breath, and
- taking a pedal cycle without owner's consent

A full, lengthy, list of recordable offences is available, provided by ACPO as an Appendix to their Retention Guidelines for Nominal Records on the Police National Computer.

== Further police powers ==
Where a person has been arrested for a recordable offence, police may fingerprint and take non-intimate DNA samples from suspects without authorisation from senior ranks.
