= Rape statistics =

Statistics on rape and other sexual assaults

Statistics on rape and other acts of sexual assault are commonly available in industrialized countries, and have become better documented throughout the world. Inconsistent definitions of rape, reporting, recording, prosecution and conviction for rape can create controversial statistical disparities, and has led to concerns that many rape statistics may not accurately represent the extent of its prevalence.

In some jurisdictions, male-on-female rape is the only form of rape counted in the statistics. Some jurisdictions also don't count being forced to penetrate another as rape, creating further controversy around rape statistics. Countries may not define marital rape (forced sex on a spouse) as rape. Rape is an under-reported crime. The reasons for not reporting rape vary across countries, and may include fear of retaliation, uncertainty about whether a crime was committed or if the offender intended harm, feelings of shame or humiliation, not wanting the offender to get in trouble, fear of prosecution (e.g. due to laws against premarital sex), and doubt in or distrust of local law enforcement.

In 2005, a United Nations statistical report compiled from government sources showed that more than 250,000 cases of rape or attempted rape were recorded by police annually. The reported data covered 65 countries.

== Research ==
Rape rates per 100,000 population for last year reported to UNODC: above 50 30 to 50 15 to 30 5 to 15 / 3 to 5 below 3 no data

Most rape research and reporting to date has been limited to male–female forms of rape. Research on male–male and female–male is beginning to be done. However, almost no research has been done on female–female rape, though women can be charged with rape in a few jurisdictions. A few books, such as Violent Betrayal: Partner Abuse in Lesbian Relationships by Dr. Claire M. Renzetti, No More Secrets: Violence in Lesbian Relationships by Janice Ristock, and Woman-to-Woman Sexual Violence: Does She Call It Rape? by Lori B. Girshick also cover the topic of rape of women by other women.

== By country ==
This table indicates the annual number of recorded rapes per capita by country for last available year. Each entry is based on that country's definition of rape, which varies widely throughout the world. It does not specify whether recorded means reported, brought to trial, or convicted. It does not include cases of rape which go unreported or unrecorded. Alternative estimates can show large differences, such as South Africa having around 500,000 rapes per year (ten times the reported rate), or Egypt having more than 20,000 rapes a year.

| Country | Reported annual per 100,000 | Year |
|---|---|---|
| Albania | 1.8 | 2023 |
| Algeria | 1.6 | 2023 |
| Andorra | 0.0 | 2019 |
| Antigua and Barbuda | 42.9 | 2023 |
| Argentina | 14.0 | 2023 |
| Armenia | 2.8 | 2023 |
| Australia | 18.7 | 2024 |
| Austria | 25.5 | 2023 |
| Azerbaijan | 0.2 | 2021 |
| Bahamas | 13.8 | 2022 |
| Bahrain | 3.2 | 2008 |
| Bangladesh | 8.0 | 2006 |
| Barbados | 14.5 | 2022 |
| Belarus | 1.2 | 2019 |
| Belgium | 37.6 | 2023 |
| Belize | 6.0 | 2022 |
| Benin | 5.2 | 2017 |
| Bermuda | 0.0 | 2014 |
| Bhutan | 6.9 | 2020 |
| Bolivia | 36.1 | 2023 |
| Bosnia and Herzegovina | 1.1 | 2023 |
| Botswana | 96.3 | 2020 |
| Brazil | 22.9 | 2020 |
| Brunei Darussalam | 7.7 | 2006 |
| Bulgaria | 1.1 | 2023 |
| Burundi | 10.6 | 2014 |
| Cabo Verde | 20.7 | 2015 |
| Cameroon | 1.1 | 2021 |
| Canada | 1.4 | 2012 |
| Chile | 21.9 | 2023 |
| Colombia | 38.5 | 2023 |
| Costa Rica | 50.1 | 2023 |
| Croatia | 10.8 | 2023 |
| Cyprus | 3.0 | 2023 |
| Czech Republic | 16.2 | 2023 |
| Denmark | 39.9 | 2023 |
| Dominica | 13.5 | 2022 |
| Dominican Republic | 11.8 | 2023 |
| Ecuador | 33.1 | 2023 |
| Egypt | 0.1 | 2011 |
| El Salvador | 43.6 | 2022 |
| England and Wales | 117.3 | 2022 |
| Estonia | 14.0 | 2023 |
| Eswatini | 75.2 | 2021 |
| Finland | 42.5 | 2023 |
| France | 62.7 | 2023 |
| Georgia | 3.1 | 2019 |
| Germany | 15.5 | 2023 |
| Ghana | 1.3 | 2021 |
| Greece | 2.9 | 2023 |
| Grenada | 101.6 | 2023 |
| Guatemala | 33.2 | 2023 |
| Guinea | 1.0 | 2007 |
| Guyana | 24.1 | 2023 |
| Haiti | 2.2 | 2018 |
| Honduras | 16.9 | 2023 |
| Hong Kong | 0.9 | 2023 |
| Hungary | 5.5 | 2023 |
| Iceland | 45.4 | 2023 |
| India | 2.2 | 2022 |
| Indonesia | 0.5 | 2022 |
| Iraq (Central) | 2.5 | 2021 |
| Ireland | 19.3 | 2023 |
| Israel | 15.5 | 2023 |
| Jamaica | 16.9 | 2023 |
| Japan | 2.2 | 2023 |
| Jordan | 1.6 | 2021 |
| Kazakhstan | 7.1 | 2017 |
| Kenya | 1.5 | 2022 |
| Kosovo | 5.7 | 2021 |
| Kuwait | 4.3 | 2009 |
| Kyrgyzstan | 7.3 | 2020 |
| Latvia | 15.0 | 2023 |
| Lebanon | 0.0 | 2023 |
| Lesotho | 89.7 | 2009 |
| Liechtenstein | 12.6 | 2023 |
| Lithuania | 3.2 | 2023 |
| Luxembourg | 22.0 | 2023 |
| Macau | 3.0 | 2022 |
| Madagascar | 1.3 | 2015 |
| Malaysia | 4.8 | 2023 |
| Maldives | 1.3 | 2017 |
| Malta | 11.8 | 2023 |
| Mauritius | 2.8 | 2021 |
| Mexico | 19.0 | 2023 |
| Moldova | 9.4 | 2023 |
| Monaco | 13.4 | 2016 |
| Mongolia | 16.4 | 2023 |
| Montenegro | 2.4 | 2023 |
| Morocco | 2.7 | 2023 |
| Mozambique | 0.2 | 2009 |
| Myanmar | 1.3 | 2023 |
| Namibia | 43.0 | 2021 |
| Nepal | 4.2 | 2016 |
| Netherlands | 13.3 | 2023 |
| New Zealand | 58.6 | 2023 |
| Nicaragua | 15.0 | 2019 |
| Nigeria | 0.4 | 2013 |
| North Macedonia | 1.8 | 2023 |
| Northern Ireland | 63.0 | 2023 |
| Norway | 42.1 | 2023 |
| Oman | 0.0 | 2018 |
| Pakistan | 2.37 | 2023 |
| Palestine | 0.17 | 2023 |
| Panama | 76.3 | 2022 |
| Paraguay | 18.6 | 2023 |
| Peru | 31.1 | 2022 |
| Philippines | 1.2 | 2023 |
| Poland | 1.3 | 2023 |
| Portugal | 4.7 | 2023 |
| Puerto Rico | 7.1 | 2022 |
| Qatar | 0.7 | 2021 |
| Romania | 13.9 | 2023 |
| Russia | 5.8 | 2020 |
| Rwanda | 2.4 | 2013 |
| Saint Kitts and Nevis | 49.2 | 2022 |
| Saint Lucia | 10.6 | 2023 |
| Saudi Arabia | 0.1 | 2019 |
| Scotland | 43.6 | 2023 |
| Senegal | 0.5 | 2016 |
| Serbia | 1.3 | 2023 |
| Sierra Leone | 1.3 | 2008 |
| Singapore | 7.5 | 2023 |
| Slovakia | 1.8 | 2023 |
| Slovenia | 12.2 | 2023 |
| Solomon Islands | 11.0 | 2008 |
| South Africa | 69.5 | 2017 |
| South Korea | 13.3 | 2004 |
| Spain | 10.2 | 2023 |
| Sri Lanka | 7.9 | 2019 |
| St. Vincent and Grenadines | 30.4 | 2022 |
| Sudan | 3.5 | 2008 |
| Suriname | 49.9 | 2023 |
| Sweden | 24.4 | 2024 |
| Switzerland | 9.5 | 2023 |
| Syria | 0.1 | 2018 |
| São Tomé and Príncipe | 1.6 | 2011 |
| Tajikistan | 0.3 | 2020 |
| Tanzania | 11.2 | 2015 |
| Thailand | 5.6 | 2023 |
| Trinidad and Tobago | 6.2 | 2020 |
| Turkey | 15.4 | 2014 |
| Turkmenistan | 0.5 | 2006 |
| Uganda | 3.3 | 2017 |
| Ukraine | 0.84 | 2020 |
| United Arab Emirates | 0.54 | 2022 |
| United States of America | 41.4 | 2022 |
| Uruguay | 6.1 | 2023 |
| Uzbekistan | 0.6 | 2021 |
| Vatican City | 0.0 | 2023 |
| Venezuela | 2.5 | 2018 |
| Yemen | 0.7 | 2009 |
| Zimbabwe | 33.2 | 2023 |

== Policy and statistics by country ==
=== Afghanistan ===
Rape in Afghanistan is a crime which can be legally prosecuted, but in practice it is very rarely reported, because of the immense risks that women face if they report it. In 2011, Afghanistan made international news in regard to the story of a woman who was raped by a man, jailed for adultery, gave birth to a child in jail, and was then subsequently pardoned by president Hamid Karzai, and in the end married the man who raped her.

In 2012, Afghanistan recorded 240 cases of honour killings and 160 cases of rape, but did not distinguish between the two crimes. In 2013, in eastern Ghazni, a man attacked a woman and attempted to rape her, and as a result the relatives of the woman killed both the woman and the man in an honour killing. In Afghanistan, crimes such as adultery, rape and trafficking are often conflated with each other, and it is generally not acceptable for a woman and a man to be alone together (unless married or related). If this happens, the response can be very violent: an Afghan medical doctor and his female patient were attacked by an angry mob who threw stones at them after the two were discovered in his private examining room without a chaperon. In 2013, the security forces were also alleged to rape children in the country.

=== Algeria ===
Article 336 of the Penal Code stipulates that rape is a punishable offence, but does not give a definition of rape, as this is left to the courts. The lack of a clear definition of rape in Algerian law makes it difficult for people to report the act and seek legal remedies.

The Hassi Messaoud was reported in 2001, 2005, and 2010 to sexually assault, traffic, and abuse women.

There have been continuous allegations that during the Algerian War French troops had engaged in acts of torture and rape against Algerians.

=== Australia ===
Non-consensual sexual penetration is termed "rape" in Victoria, Queensland, South Australia, and Tasmania; "Sexual Assault" in New South Wales; "Sexual intercourse without consent" in the ACT and the Northern Territory; "Sexual penetration without consent" in Western Australia. All these offences are gender neutral and applicable in marriage. The laws in Australia have evolved from the English common law offence of rape, but have gradually changed, especially in the late 20th century.

In Australia the reported rape rate per 100,000 people is relatively high, although it is in a decreasing trend, coming down from 91.6 in 2003 to 28.6 in 2010. This stands in contrast to reported rape rate of 1.2 per 100,000 in Japan, 1.8 per 100,000 in India, 4.6 rapes per 100,000 in Bahrain, 12.3 per 100,000 in Mexico, 24.1 per 100,000 in United Kingdom, 28.6 per 100,000 in United States, 66.5 per 100,000 in Sweden.

During the 12 months prior to interview in 2011–12, an estimated 51,200 (0.3%) Australians aged 18 years and over were a victim of sexual assault. Almost a third (30%) of victims of sexual assault had the most recent incident they experienced reported to the police.

The Australian Women's Safety Survey conducted by the Bureau of Statistics in 1996 involved a random sample of 6,300 women aged 18 and over. It produced incidence finding of 1.9 per cent for sexual assault in the previous 12 months. Men who are known to the woman accounted for over two-thirds of assailants (68%). Only 15% of the assaulted women in the sample reported to the police.

=== Bangladesh ===
Bangladesh has received criticism for its employment of the "two-finger test" in rape investigations. This test consists of a physical examination of women who report rape during which a doctor inserts two fingers in the woman's vagina to determine whether the woman is "habituated to sex". This examination has its origin in the country's British colonial-era laws dating back to 1872. This deters many women from reporting rape. More than 100 experts, including doctors, lawyers, police, and women's rights activists, signed a joint statement in 2013 asking for the test, which they called "demeaning", to be abolished, as it "does not provide any evidence that is relevant to proving the offence." On 12 April 2018 Bangladesh High Court banned the "two-finger test" on the ground that the tests have no scientific merit or evidential value.

Between the years of 2010 and 2013, the United Nations Multi-country Study on Men and Violence asked men in rural and urban Bangladesh if they had forced a woman to have sex at any point in their lives. 14.1% of men in rural Bangladesh and 9.5% of men in urban Bangladesh said yes (10% averaged). 2.7% of men in rural Bangladesh and 0.5% (6/1252) in urban Bangladesh had raped in the past year. In rural Bangladesh 41.4% of rapists perpetrated more than once, 3.7% had four or more victims, and 40% first raped as a teenager. 82% of rural Bangladeshi and 79% of urban Bangladeshi men cited entitlement as their reason for rape. 61.2% of urban Bangladeshi men who had raped did not feel guilty or worried afterwards, and 95.1% experienced no legal consequences. 3.7% of men in rural Bangladesh had raped another man. 89.2% of urban Bangladeshi men agreed to the statement "if a woman doesn't physically fight back, it's not rape."

=== Belgium ===
In 2008, the incidence of rapes recorded by the police was 26.3 per 100,000 people, according to data by UNODC.

Rape in Belgium is defined by Article 375 of the Penal Code as "any act of sexual penetration, of whatever sort and by whatever means, committed on a non-consenting person". Marital rape is also illegal under this law.

Apart from criminal proceedings, committing marital rape has also consequences in a divorce case. The new amendments of the Civil Code regulating marriage and divorce, that came into effect in September 2007, state that any of the spouses, following a divorce, may receive alimony if they need the money; but a spouse who has committed rape or other violent crimes against the other spouse cannot receive alimony. Article 301 reads: "The court may refuse to grant the application for a alimony if the defendant proves that the applicant has committed a serious offense that rendered it impossible to continue living together. Under no circumstances will alimony be given to a spouse who was found guilty of an act referred to in Articles 375, 398-400, 402, 403 or 405 of the Penal Code, committed against the person of the defendant, or an attempt to commit an act referred to in Articles 375, 393, 394 or 397 of the Code against the same person."

=== Belize ===
According to the Belize Police Department, in 2013 there were 26 cases of rape reported in the country. The estimated total population in 2013 was 334,297.

In 2006, the incidence of rapes recorded by the police was 15.3 per 100,000 people, according to data by UNODC.

According to a 2009 report, bribery in rape investigations, including those involving child rape, is common. Suspects often offer money to the police or to the victims/their families.

The laws were amended in Belize in 1999 to criminalize marital rape; the law defines marital rape that happens at the time the spouses are cohabiting more narrowly than rape in other circumstances; it stipulates that the act is criminal if "The act of sexual intercourse is preceded or accompanied by or associated with, assault and battery, harm or injury to the female spouse". Rape between unmarried persons, or between separated spouses is defined by lack of consent.

=== Bosnia and Herzegovina ===
During the Bosnian war, rape was prevalent. In 1993, a European Community commission estimated that around 20,000 women were raped, while the Bosnian Government put the figure at 50,000.

=== Botswana ===
In a 2009 study, 4.9% of 1244 women of 13–24 years reported having been raped in their lifetimes. 10.3% of 654 women reported that they had been raped in their lifetimes in a 2011 study. 4.6% had been raped in the past year. 3.9% of 613 men had been raped in their lifetimes and 4.2% had raped in the past year.

=== Brazil ===
In Brazil, rape is "alarmingly under-reported" and there are no accurate data to compare rape rates among the country's twenty-six states and federal district. However, in 2012, there were 6,029 rapes in the state of Rio de Janeiro; 4,993 of the victims were women. On average, 416 women a month were raped that year and according to Rio's state Institute of Public Security (ISP) the rate of rape in the state is 37 per 100,000 population for victims of both sexes. Rio's civil police say that in the first quarter of 2013, 1,822 rapes were committed, while there were only 70 individuals arrested for the crimes. Typically, the victims were mainly black women, aged between 20 and 30 years, and coming from any social class.

=== Burma ===
Systematic rape committed by the military against civilians has been documented in Myanmar. A 2002 report by The Shan Human Rights Foundation and The Shan Women's Action Network, titled License to Rape, details incidents of sexual violence committed by Tatmadaw (Burmese Army) troops in Shan State, mostly between 1996 and 2001.

The military of Burma has also been accused of continuing to use rape as a weapon of war after the elections of 2010. In 2014, a women's group, The Women's League of Burma, said it had documented more than 100 cases of rape by the military since 2010.

According to a 2012 report by Human Rights Watch, the Burmese security forces have committed killings, rape, and mass arrests against Rohingya Muslims.

=== Burundi ===
Marital rape was criminalized in 2009, albeit with a rather symbolic sentence of only 8 days imprisonment and a fine of 10.000 to 50.000 Fbu. The new 2009 Criminal Code also criminalized homosexuality which was legal before; but it also abolished the capital punishment in the country, therefore the new Code received mixed reactions from human rights organizations.

A report by Amnesty International found that rape was very common in Burundi, rarely prosecuted, and that victims faced strong social stigma and a high risk of reprisal.

=== Cambodia ===
In Cambodia, rape is estimated by local and international NGOs to be common, but only a very small minority of these assaults are ever reported to authorities, due to the social stigma associated to being the victim of a sexual crime, and, in particular, to losing virginity before marriage (regardless of how this happened). From November 2008 to November 2009, police had recorded 468 cases of rape, attempted rape and sexual harassment, a 2.4 percent increase over the previous year. Breaking the Silence – Sexual Violence in Cambodia is a report produced by Amnesty International, and released in 2010, which examined the situation of sexual violence in Cambodia. The report found that, in the small minority of rapes which are reported, a very common response is for law-enforcement officials, including police and court staff, to arrange extralegal out-of-court 'agreements' between the victim and the perpetrator (or their families), in which the rapist pays a sum of money which is shared between the authorities and the victim (and her family), after which the victim has to withdraw any criminal complaint against the perpetrator, and public prosecutors close the case. When a rape is investigated, a complainant is generally expected to pay an extralegal sum of money to the authorities, to ensure that the court investigates the case, otherwise progress is slow, and it may take over two years for anything to happen. During the pre-trial period, there is always a risk that the perpetrator's family will pay a bribe to secure his acquittal or reduced charge.

The UN reported results in 2013 from a study that they did in six Asia-Pacific countries about violence against women. 20.4% of Cambodian men said that they had raped a woman in their lifetime and 11.3% had raped in the past year. 3.3% had raped another man at some point and 23% had participated in gang rape, the largest percentage out of the nine areas surveyed. Cambodia was the only area where gang rape was the most commonly reported form of non-partner rape. 45% answered that sexual entitlement was their motive for raping a woman and 42% said they raped to punish a woman. 11.7% of rapists had raped 4 or more women. 52% first perpetrated rape as teenagers and 15.8% first did so under the age of 15. 44.5% of rapists experienced no legal consequences.

=== Canada ===
In Canadian colonies, rape was an offence at common law. The conceptualization of rape was based on English common law understanding of this offence. English legal precedent was very important. Canada got its first statutory definition of rape in 1892, under the 1892 Criminal Code, which read: "Rape is the act of a man having carnal knowledge of a woman who is not his wife without her consent, or with consent which has been extorted by threats or fear of bodily harm, or obtained by personating the woman's husband, or by false and fraudulent representations as to the nature and quality of the act." A boy under 14 could not be convicted of rape. The rape law remained virtually unchanged until 1983, when the criminal offence of "rape" was abolished and replaced by three sexual assault offences. Unlike the previous rape offence, the sexual assault offences are applicable in marriage and are gender neutral. These three offences are:

- Sexual assault
- Sexual assault with a weapon, threats to a third party or causing bodily harm
- Aggravated sexual assault.

The most frequently cited research on sexual violence was conducted by Statistics Canada in 1992, which involved a national random sample of 12,300 women (Johnson and Sacco, 1995). The research found that over one in three women had experienced a sexual assault and that only 6% of sexual assaults were reported to the police. According to Justice Institute of British Columbia, one out of every 17 women is raped, 62% of rape victims were physically injured, 9% were beaten or disfigured.

=== China ===
Between the years of 2010 and 2013, the United Nations multi-country Study on Men and Violence in Asia and the Pacific asked men in urban and rural areas of China if they had ever forced a female to have sex. 22.2% said yes. 9.3% had done so in the past year. 55% of the men who had raped had done so more than once and 23.2% had raped more than one woman. 86% cited sexual entitlement as their motive, 57% said that they raped out of fun or boredom, and 46% out of anger or punishment. And despite 47% of them reporting consequences of punishment, threats or violence as a result, 72.4% had not experienced legal consequences. 1.7% had raped another man. 2.2% had participated in gang rape. 25% who had raped reported first doing so as a teenager, the lowest percentage in the study. And while only 11.8% of men and 10.2% of women surveyed approved of generally blaming the victim, 53.7% and 53.5% of each agreed with the statement "if a woman doesn't physically fight back, it's not rape."

According to the US Department of State, there were 31,833 cases of rape in China in 2007.

=== Colombia ===
The armed conflict in Colombia has resulted in increased sexual violence against women; and Colombian authorities have been accused of failing to investigate rape complaints and failing to control sexual attacks in the country. Marital rape was criminalized in 1996. Rape is very common among internally displaced women: it is reported that one in five of these women were raped.

=== Democratic Republic of the Congo ===
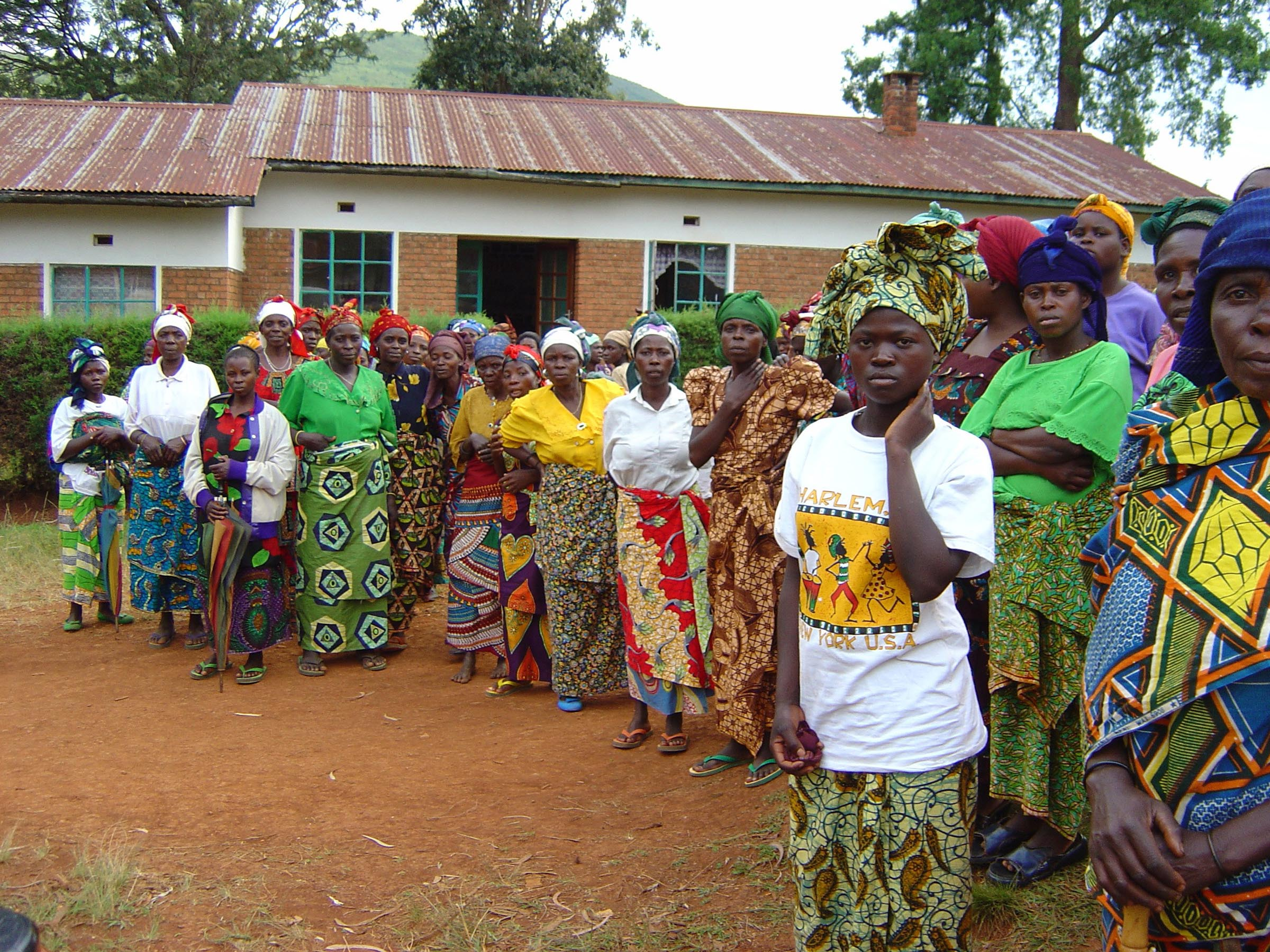
Meeting of victims of sexual violence in the Democratic Republic of the Congo

In eastern Congo, the prevalence and intensity of rape and other sexual violence is described as the worst in the world. It is estimated that there are as many as 200,000 surviving rape victims living in the Democratic Republic of the Congo today. A new study says more than 400,000 women are raped in the Democratic Republic of Congo annually. War rape in the Democratic Republic of Congo has frequently been described as a "weapon of war" by commentators. Louise Nzigire, a local social worker, states that "this violence was designed to exterminate the population." Nzigire observes that rape has been a "cheap, simple weapon for all parties in the war, more easily obtainable than bullets or bombs." In an analysis of 2565 patients who received medical care in the Médecins Sans Frontières sexual violence clinic in the capital of Ituri, Bunia, between 2005 and 2006, 73% (95.2% of male victims) reported being raped by armed men. 74.5% experienced gang rape (89.3% of male and 73.9% of female victims), with attack by between two and four perpetrators being the most common scenario (58.9%) for both sexes. 48.6% of victims were attacked while doing daily domestic activities outside their homes.

=== Denmark ===
Although only approximately 500 rapes are reported to the Danish police annually, several studies estimate that only a small minority of all rapes are actually reported, and only one in five reported rapes result in a conviction in court. For example, according to a 2014 study published by the European Union Agency for Fundamental Rights, Denmark had the highest prevalence rate of physical and sexual violence against women in Europe.

The Danish government was harshly criticized for inadequate laws in regard to sexual violence in a 2008 report produced by Amnesty International. The Danish criminal provisions regarding sexual crimes had remained nearly unchanged for 30 years, which lead Amnesty International to declare that "legislation on rape and sexual violence [conflicted] with human rights principles concerning the need to protect an individual's sexual and physical integrity and right to self-determination." The organization repeatedly urged Denmark to bring legislation on rape in line with international law over several years, which lead to an amendment to the sexual offences code in 2013, following a change in government after the 2011 elections.

Sexual offences (Danish: Seksualforbrydelser) are defined in the Danish Penal Code, Chapter 24, Section 216–236. References in legislation to marriage were removed following the 2013 amendment (previously providing for a reduced sentence or a pardon), and sexual acts performed on victims in a helpless state now also count as rape.

In Denmark it was only 1999 that the first rape crisis centre was established.

=== East Timor ===
Marital rape was made illegal in East Timor in 2010, under the Law on Domestic Violence, Law No. 7/2010 which states that "Sexual violence is understood as any conduct that induces the person to witness, to maintain or participate in unwanted sexual relations, even within a marriage, through intimidation, threats, coercion or use of force, or which limits or nullifies the exercise of sexual and reproductive rights".

The UN claimed that thousands of East Timorese women were raped during the Indonesian occupation of East Timor and that rape was used by the Indonesian military as a weapon of war. The UN commission stated that: "Rape, sexual slavery and sexual violence were tools used as part of the campaign designed to inflict a deep experience of terror, powerlessness and hopelessness upon pro-independence supporters."

=== Egypt ===
Marital rape is not a criminal offence in Egypt. Unlike many other countries in the Middle East, Egypt has, in 1999, abolished the law which stipulated that a man could escape a rape conviction if he married his victim after the fact.

Women are generally fearful when it comes to reporting rape. Engy Ghozlan of Egyptian Centre for Women's Rights and others suggest that the number of rape cases is over 200,000 every year. Ghozlan further adds that rapes are not decreasing because young men lack adequate income and employment, so their marriages are delayed.

During the 2012-13 Egyptian protests, rape has been carried out publicly. On 3 July 2013, it was reported that about 91 women were raped and sexually abused in Tahrir Square in four days. By some estimates, the figure was about 169.

=== Ethiopia ===
Rape is a very serious problem in Ethiopia, and the country is infamous for the practice of marriage by abduction, with the prevalence of this practice in Ethiopia being one of the highest in the world. In many parts of Ethiopia, it is common for a man, working in co-ordination with his friends, to kidnap a girl or woman, sometimes using a horse to ease the escape. The abductor will then hide his intended bride and rape her until she becomes pregnant. As the father of the woman's child, the man can claim her as his wife. Subsequently, the kidnapper may try to negotiate a bride price with the village elders to legitimize the marriage. Girls as young as eleven years old are reported to have been kidnapped for the purpose of marriage.

Ethiopia is estimated to have one of the highest rates of violence against women in the world. A report by the UN found that women in Ethiopia are the most likely to suffer domestic violence at the hands of their partners, and that nearly 60% of Ethiopian women were subjected to sexual violence. The 2004 Criminal Code of Ethiopia creates the offence of rape, by Article 620, which states that: "Whoever compels a woman to submit to sexual intercourse outside wedlock, whether by the use of violence or grave intimidation, or after having rendered her unconscious or incapable of resistance, is punishable with rigorous imprisonment from five years to fifteen years". There are also certain aggravated circumstances which lead to an increased punishment for rape. Apart from the criminal offence of rape, there are also other sexual offences in the Criminal Code. The age of consent is 18. As can be seen above, a woman cannot charge her husband with rape. However, the 2004 Criminal Code brings major improvements for women's rights in the country, by criminalizing several forms of violence against women, such as female genital mutilation, violence against pregnant women, marriage by abduction, child marriage, trafficking and sexual harassment, though Chapter III – Crimes Committed against life, person and health through harmful traditional practices (Articles 561–570) and other provisions (Articles 587, 597, 625, 635, 637, 648). Article 564 – Violence Against a Marriage Partner or a Person Cohabiting in an Irregular Union is a major step forward.

The Ethiopian military has been accused of committing systematic rapes against civilians. Human Rights Watch has repeatedly claimed that the army has attacked, beaten, raped and killed civilians, something which the Ethiopian authorities have denied. However, US scientists said that satellite images confirmed reports that the Ethiopian military had burnt towns and villages in Ethiopia's Somali region.

A study in Addis Ababa of high school boys found that 4.3% had been raped in their lives. According to the WHO Multi-country Study on Women's Health and Domestic Violence against Women, 59% of women reported sexual abuse by a partner; while one third of women reported being "physically forced" to have sex against their will with their partner within the past 12 months. This was the highest prevalence of all countries surveyed.

=== Finland ===
In Finland, the legal regulations on sexual offences were revised with a law that came into effect on 1. January 1999. Under this revision, sexual offences were divided into three levels: rape, aggravated rape and forcing someone into a sexual act. The revision also affects the cause of action. The law on rape (Chapter 20 - Sex offences Section 1 - Rape) states that: "(1) A person who forces another into sexual intercourse by the use or threat of violence shall be sentenced for rape to imprisonment for at least one year and at most six years. (2) Also a person who, by taking advantage of the fact that another person, due to unconsciousness, illness, disability, state of fear or other state of helplessness, is unable to defend himself or herself or to formulate or express his or her will, has sexual intercourse with him or her, shall be sentenced for rape." The Finnish government does not produce data on rape on a regular basis, beyond the raw numbers of reported rape to Finnish police. The laws and guidelines have been criticized for not making specific reference to "consent" and for offering the possibility of mediation between the victim and perpetrator. Specific information on women victims of rape can be found only from separate studies, the last one made in 2004, and that study was based on reported rape offences during the years 1998–1999. The study showed that of 468 rapes or attempted rapes reported to the police, only 47 rape charges were made, or that merely 10 per cent of the rapes reported to the police lead to a prosecution. In most cases the rape victim and the offender knew each other, only in every fourth case was the woman attacked by a stranger. Almost half the rape occurred among acquaintances (corresponding to a date rape), and intimate or family relations were involved in 13 per cent of the cases.

Finland had 980 cases of reported rape in 2013. The number of reported rape had increased in 2006 by 91% when measured since 1977, and by 27% when measured from 1997. According to a 2014 study published by the European Union Agency for Fundamental Rights, approximately 47% of women surveyed in Finland were said to have suffered physical and/or sexual abuse; which was the second highest rate after Denmark. Finland was one of the last countries in the EU to criminalize marital rape, making it illegal in 1994, after years of debate.

Convicted rapists receive very short penalties compared to other countries, although this may be due to the fact that Finland has one of the lowest incarceration rates in the world. During 2001–2003, the average sentence for rape was two years' imprisonment, and only 63% of offenders served their sentences in prison, as 37% of sentences were conditional. The average sentence for aggravated rape was four years' imprisonment. For the offence of coercion into sexual intercourse, sentences were most often one year conditional imprisonment, but only 4% of offenders went to prison.

The issue of violence against women in Finland has been of major international interest and the situation has been described as a paradox, because otherwise the country has offered women high professional and social opportunities. According to Turku University law professor Kevät Nousiainen, "the way Finns conceive gender is different. It's assumed women are perfectly capable of taking care of themselves, and if they are not able to do so, that is unacceptable." After World War I, Finland fought a war of independence, a civil war, and two decades later the Winter War, the Continuation War, and the Lapland War, which made up Finland's part in World War II. In each case Finland fought as a poorly trained underdog in brutal conditions that Nousiainen says left men "unbalanced". "Violence was taken somehow for granted, it was tolerated. And then you have to consider the transfer of violent behaviour from generation to generation," she said.

=== France ===
Article 222-23 of the criminal code reads: "Any act of sexual penetration, whatever its nature, committed against another person by violence, constraint, threat or surprise, is rape".

=== Germany ===
Under German law, a person commits rape if they employ any of these three types of coercion: 1. force; or 2. threat of imminent danger to life or limb; or 3. exploitation of a situation in which the victim is unprotected and at the mercy of the offender. Germany was one of the last Western countries to criminalize marital rape, it did so only in 1997, after a lengthy political battle which started in the 1970s. The criminalization of marital rape has been delayed by political disagreement: even when there was consensus that it should be criminalized, there was disagreement between those who wanted it punished and prosecuted in the same way as non-marital rape and those who opposed this. These disagreements have delayed the criminalization until 1997, when rape in marriage was made illegal being treated in the same way as non-marital rape. In Germany the age of consent is 14, although some limitations do exist up to the age of 18 (regarding the exploitation of the lack of capacity for sexual self-determination of 14–15 y/o; and engaging in sexual activity with a person under 18 "by taking advantage of an exploitative situation"; or paying for sex with a minor under 18 - Section 182 of the Criminal Code). Chapter 13 of the Criminal Code is called "Offences against sexual self-determination" and consists of Sections 174 to 184 which define sexual crimes.

=== Ghana ===
In a survey of Ghanaians, 8% of women reported having been raped by a man in their lifetimes and 5% of men reported having raped a wife or girlfriend.

=== Iceland ===
Rape in Iceland is defined by Article 194 of the Penal Code which states: "Any person who has sexual intercourse or other sexual relations with a person by means of using violence, threats or other unlawful coercion shall be guilty of rape and shall be imprisoned for a minimum of 1 year and a maximum of 16 years. 'Violence' here refers to the deprivation of independence by means of confinement, drugs or other comparable means. Exploiting a person's psychiatric disorder or other mental handicap, or the fact that, for other reasons, he or she is not in a condition to be able to resist the action or to understand its significance, in order to have sexual intercourse or other sexual relations with him or her, shall also be considered as rape, and shall result in the same punishment as specified in the first paragraph of this article."

Although a Nordic country, known for a high level of gender equality, Iceland has, until recently, maintained outdated provisions in its sexual offences laws. Before 2007, the law in regard to rape and certain other sexual offences stated that, if after the assault the victim and the perpetrator got married or entered into an informal cohabitation, then the punishment could be waived; if the assault took place between married or cohabiting partners, and following the act, the victim continued to live together with the perpetrator, then the punishment could also be waived. These provisions were repealed by Act No. 61/2007. Other legal changes which were made included the broadening of the definition of rape and other sexual offences, and the raising of the age of consent to 15, from 14.

In 2008, the incidence of rapes recorded by the police was 21.6 per 100,000 people, according to data by UNODC. A 2010 study found that 6% of Icelandic women had been sexually victimized in an intimate relationship during their lifetime.

=== India ===
Based on statistics published by Statista, the country had a rape rate of approximately 2.21 per 100,000 people as of 2022. The National Crime Records Bureau (NCRB) in its 2023 report put India's rape rate at 4.4 per 100,000 women. However, the incidence of rape and its rates of reporting vary widely from rural to urban areas, and across India's 28 states and 8 union territories.

In 2018, official data showed that 1 rape was reported every 5 minutes in India. Of the 134,000 cases reported, just over 85 per cent led to charges, and 27 per cent ultimately led to convictions. Of these, 31,320 were committed by perpetrators known to the victim (93.9% of the cases). This had increased to 97.5% by end-2023. As high as 27.8 per cent of victims were minors or below 18, the legal age of consent. This high percentage of perpetrators being a close family member (Father/Brother) or acquaintance has remained constant over the years.

In 2015, the Times of India reported 1300 rapes and 1500 molestation cases were reported in two months from January to February 2015. But the absolute number of rapes reported have remained broadly similar since 2015.

As of 2018, Madhya Pradesh had the highest raw number of rape reports among Indian states. By end-2023, however, Madhya Pradesh was 3rd on the list with 2979 cases, while Rajasthan (5078) and Uttar Pradesh (3516) reported the most cases of rape. Rajasthan also had the highest rape rate among all states (12.8 per 100,000 women), while the Union Territory of Chandigarh had the highest rate nationwide (17.9). Among metropolitan cities, the national capital of Delhi had the highest incidence of rape, while Jaipur had the highest rape rate.

In 2016, Union Minister for Women and Child Development Maneka Gandhi reported to the Lok Sabha that 13,766 cases of child rape were reported to the National Crime Records Bureau in 2014. India ranked 46 in the ranking of reported rape cases per 100,000 population in 2010.

=== Indonesia ===
The United Nations Multi-country Study on Men and Violence studied three different sites of Indonesia (Jakarta, rural Java, and Jayapura). In the rural area, the lifetime prevalence of perpetration of rape towards a female/females was 19.5% and gang rape 7%. When rapists were asked why they perpetrated their last non-partner rape, 76.5% of the men in the three areas averaged cited sexual entitlement, 55.2% entertainment-seeking, and 29.7% anger/punishment.

=== Italy ===
During the first half of the 20th century, in some areas of Italy, rape victims were often expected and forced to marry their rapist. In 1965, a 17-year-old girl from Sicily, created a sensation when – fully supported by her poor family and the local police – she refused to marry the man who kidnapped and raped her. In refusing this "rehabilitating marriage" to the perpetrator, she went against the traditional social norms of the time, which dictated a supposed solution, and the rapist was sentenced to ten years in prison followed by two years of internal exile in another region. His seven accomplices were sentenced to five years. The Criminal Code of Italy also supported this practice, by exonerating the rapist who married the victim. The article of law whereby a rapist could extinguish his crime by marrying his victim was abolished in 1981. The Franca Viola incident was made into a movie called La moglie più bella.

In 1999, in an infamous case that gained international attention, the Court of Cassation of Italy ordered a new Appeal trial for a man a lower Court had found guilty of the rape of a woman who was wearing tight jeans. The Court did not claim that it is impossible to forcibly remove tight jeans "without the collaboration of the person wearing them" if she resists, but it claimed that such impossibility was plausible only in the given case and that, combined with other more significant evidence come up during the trial, it had led "in abundantiam" to ruling in favour of a new trial. The court did not equated the removal of the jeans with consent to sexual penetration as stated by Italian and Anglo-Saxon press. Following this ruling, there was outrage, both in Italy and abroad. In Italy, female politicians wore jeans to parliament in protest. In 2008, the Court of Cassation did not overturn this infamous ruling: it confirmed the guilty verdict of a lower Court in a case where the victim had removed her own jeans under duress.

In another case that sparked outrage, in 2006, the Court of Cassation ruled that a 41-year-old man who raped his 14-year-old stepdaughter could seek to have his sentence reduced – but not overturned – in a new appellate trial, due to the fact that the girl had already been sexually active: "since the age of 13 [she] had had many sexual relations with men of every age and it's right to assume that at the time of the encounter with the suspect, her personality, from a sexual point of view, was much more developed than what one might normally expect from a girl of her age". Therefore, the Court of Cassation ruled that the first Appeal Court should not have apodictically based its rejection of the existence of mitigating circumstances only on the long-life consequences of the rape. UNICEF in Italy stated that the decision "seriously violates human rights and the dignity of a minor."

=== Japan ===
In Japan, rape is defined as a crime of forced sexual intercourse in Article 177 of the Penal Code of Japan. National Police Agency publishes rape statistics in Japan.

=== Jordan ===
Under the law of Jordan, rape is defined by Article 292, which reads: "Whoever has sexual intercourse with a woman, other than his wife, without her consent—whether through coercion, threat, deception, or fraud—is punished with hard labor for no less than 15 years". According to UNODC statistics, in 2006, the incidence of rapes recorded by the police was 1.9 per 100,000 people.

=== Latvia ===
The laws on sexual offences were modified in Latvia in 2014, broadening the scope of the legislation. In Latvia, a person who commits an act of sexual intercourse by means of violence, threats, taking advantage of the state of helplessness of the victim, or by abuse of authority, is guilty of rape. (Section 159 of the Criminal Code). Rape and other sexual crimes are defined under Chapter XVI called "Criminal Offences against Morals and Sexual Inviolability". In 2014, Section 48 called Aggravating Circumstances (which defines circumstances which constitute an aggravation to a crime) was modified, ensuring that marital rape is covered by legislation, by defining as an aggravating circumstance the fact that: "(15) a criminal offence related to violence or threats of violence, or against morals and sexual inviolability, is committed against a person to whom the perpetrator is related in the first or the second degree of kinship, against the spouse or former spouse, or against a person with whom the perpetrator is or has been in unregistered marital relationship, or against a person with whom the perpetrator has a joint (single) household". In 2008, according to data by UNODC, the incidence of rapes recorded by the police was 4.4 per 100,000 people. In J. L. v. Latvia (2012), the European Court of Human Rights found that Latvia had failed to comply with its obligation under Article 3 of the European Convention on Human Rights to carry out an effective investigation into allegations of ill-treatment, because it had failed to properly investigate a prisoner's allegations of rape and assault by fellow inmates, who sought revenge against the victim due to his co-operation with the police.

=== Lebanon ===
In December 2016, the Campaign Against Lebanese Rape Law - Article 522 was launched in order to abolish the article that allowed a rapist to avoid prison by marrying the victim. Prior to its abolishment in February 2017, the article read: "If a valid contract of marriage is made between the perpetrator of any of the offences mentioned in this section, and the victim, the prosecution is suspended. If judgment was already passed, the implementation of the punishment is suspended." Since February 2017, other articles of the penal code are being amended to reinforce penalties against rapists that commit sexual assault on girls under 15.

=== Lesotho ===
Rape is one of Lesotho's main social issues. According to UNODC, the incidence of rapes recorded in 2008 by the police in Lesotho was the highest incidence of any country. In a study of 1,049 women, 33% said they had been raped by the age of 18. In 66% of cases the rapist was a boyfriend. In the 2009 DHS survey 15.7% of men said that a husband is justified in hitting or beating his wife if she refuses to have sex with him, while 16% said a husband is justified to use force to have sex. HIV/AIDS in Lesotho is a very serious problem, with 23.1% of adults aged 15 to 49 living with it. In a study, researchers have concluded that "Given the high prevalence of HIV in Lesotho, programs should address women's right to control their sexuality."

=== Libya ===
Victims of rape in Libya are often deemed as having 'dishonoured' their families and communities, and may face serious violence, including honour killings. According to UNHCR, "In Libya when rape occurs, it seems to be a whole village or town which is seen to be dishonoured". Women who have been raped experience extreme shame; according to a charity worker, being raped is "worse than death for them [the victims]".

=== Mexico ===
Mexico has a federal law, as well as state laws. Mexican laws have been modernized significantly from the 1990s onwards. Rape laws used to include stipulations that the penalty was to be reduced if the victim had "provoked" the attacker. In 2005, the Supreme Court of Mexico ruled that forced sex in marriage is rape. In doing so, it overturned its prior verdict from 1994 when it had ruled that the laws on rape were inapplicable in marriage. In Mexico, the rape laws did not include a statutory exemption for marriage, but were, as elsewhere, generally understood as inapplicable in this context. This has started to be challenged in the late 20th century. Following the Court's decision in 1994, women's organizations worked to pass state laws against marital rape in order to overturn this precedent. The new 2005 verdict has been interpreted as evidence of the improvement of the position of women in the country. Mexico has recently been plagued by scandals of child sexual abuse in Catholic institutions. A 2013 violent gang rape of six Spanish tourist women in Acapulco has raised questions about how safe Mexico is for tourists.

=== Netherlands ===
The law on rape in the Netherlands states that: "A person who by an act of violence or another act or by threat of violence or threat of another act compels a person to submit to acts comprising or including sexual penetration of the body is guilty of rape and liable to a term of imprisonment of not more than twelve years or a fine of the fifth category."

Apart from the offence of 'rape', there are also other sexual offences. Marital rape was made illegal in 1991; before that date, rape was defined as a man forcing, by violence or threat of thereof, a woman to engage in sexual intercourse outside of marriage.

According to a 2014 study published by the European Union Agency for Fundamental Rights, the Netherlands had the fourth highest prevalence rate of physical and sexual violence against women in Europe, with 45% of women having experienced such violence, which is well above the European average of 33%.

In 2020 an investigation by the daily newspaper Algemeen Dagblad revealed that since 2017 a judge has never imposed the maximum prison sentence of 12 years in a Dutch rape case. The highest sentence was six years, the lowest 21 days. On average, a rapist was jailed for a year and five months.

=== Nicaragua ===
In a 2010 report on sexual violence in Nicaragua, Amnesty International stated that "Rape of girls is endemic". In Nicaragua, between 1998 and 2008, police recorded 14,377 cases of rape, with more than two thirds of reports involving girls under the age of 17. Reporting of rape, however, is estimated to be low, because rape victims often face social hostility and indifference from authorities. Since 2008, abortion is illegal without any exception, and this ban has been criticized as oppressive to rape victims who become pregnant.

In 2012, Nicaragua enacted Law no 779 – Integral Law against Violence against Women (Ley Integral contra la Violencia hacia la Mujer). This law criminalizes a wide range of acts of violence against women, such as domestic violence, including marital rape.

=== Nigeria ===
According to Amnesty International, police forces in Nigeria are reported to have perpetrated acts of rape and other sexual abuse against women, in public locations, or while women were transferred to police stations, or while women visited male detainees in police custody; and sometimes police used sexual violence in order to extract confessions and other information.

A study of students of the Polytechnic, Ibadan found that in their lifetimes 1.7% (2.5% of males and 1.1% of females) had raped and 2.7% (5.3% of males and 0.9% of females) had attempted rape.

Out of a sample of 295 female students from Ebonyi State University Abakaliki in Southeast Nigeria, 36.7% had experienced sexual harassment/victimization at least once on campus. Of this, 32.4% had been raped (10.8% of the sample).

A study comparing the sexual practises of 12- to 19-year-old students with and without mild/moderate intellectual disabilities from schools across Oyo State, Nigeria found that 68.3% of the sexually experienced intellectually disabled females reported a history of rape victimization compared to 2.9% of the sexually experienced non-disabled females.

A study analysing the hospital records of 76 sexual assault victims in Ile-Ife from 2007 to 2011 found that the majority (76.1%) of the victims that sought help at a hospital did so within 24 hours of their sexual assault, but forensic evidence was not gathered because rape kits have yet to be introduced in the country.

In a 2013 poll of 585 randomly selected adults from six Nigerian geopolitical zones by NOI Polls, 34% answered "What do you think is the most prevalent cause of rape in the society?" with 'indecent dressing'. 29% said they personally knew a victim of rape.

=== North Korea ===
The situation regarding sexual violence in North Korea is very difficult to assess because of the unwillingness of the North Korean authorities to allow foreign investigators access in the country. According to Amnesty International, the analysis of satellite images of political prison camps (kwanliso) suggest that these camps are in continuous use and expansion. Amnesty International stated that hundreds of thousands of people, including children, are detained in these institutions, where they are subjected to extreme forms of abuse and violence, including rape. The organization cited a former security official at a kwanliso who worked there in the 1980s until the mid-1990s, and who confirmed these accounts. A United Nations panel has stated that the inmate population at political camps has been subjected to systematic extermination, torture, rape, forced abortions and starvation. According to the UN report, women at these camps are systematically subjected to rape by guards or bought and sold by human traffickers in China.

=== Norway ===
Rape is defined by Section 192 of the Criminal Code which states: "Any person who a) engages in sexual activity by means of violence or threats, or b) engages in sexual activity with any person who is unconscious or incapable for any other reason of resisting the act, or c) by means of violence or threats compels any person to engage in sexual activity with another person, or to carry out similar acts with himself or herself, shall be guilty of rape [...]." Sexual crimes in Norway are defined in Chapter 19 – Sexual Offenses, which contains Sections 192 to 208.

The incidence of reported rape in Norway for 2010 is given as about 35 out of 100,000; there is no in-depth national statistic. A report released in February 2014, found that 9.4 percent of the 2435 women surveyed and 1.1 percent of the 2091 interviewed men stated that they were raped. A new report released in February 2023, found that 22 percent of the women surveyed stated that they were raped.

==== Legislative history ====
Norway overhauled its sexual offences legislation in 2000. The definition of rape was broadened to include also acts committed with persons incapable of resisting, rather than only acts enforced through direct violence or threat. The law is gender-neutral. In 1974, the Supreme Court of Norway confirmed the applicability of the rape law to marital intercourse, convicting for the first time a man of raping his wife.

==== Concerns ====
There are concerns in Norway about the low reporting and conviction rate for rape. According to Amnesty International, 84% of rape cases reported to the police do not reach court; of those that reach trial, 36% end in acquittal. In 2003, the CEDAW Committee expressed concern about the situation of sexual violence in Norway, stating, "[The Committee] is also concerned that an extremely low percentage of reported rapes results in convictions and that the police and public prosecutors dismiss an increasing number of such cases."

=== Pakistan ===
Rape in Pakistan has been notable, and in recent times have continued to spike. In one case, a teenage girl was burnt alive, as she resisted the rape.

In another notable case a woman was raped on the orders of a village council, which functions as a lower-level judiciary. In 2002, 30-year-old Mukhtaran Bibi was gang-raped on the orders of the village council as an "honor rape" after allegations that her 12-year-old brother had had sexual relations with a woman from a higher caste. Although custom would expect her to commit suicide after being raped, Mukhtaran spoke up, and pursued the case, which was picked up by both domestic and international media. On 1 September 2002, an anti-terrorism court sentenced six men (including the four rapists) to death for rape. In 2005, the Lahore High Court cited "insufficient evidence" and acquitted 5 of the 6 convicted, and commuted the punishment for the sixth man to a life sentence. Mukhtaran and the government appealed this decision, and the Supreme Court suspended the acquittal and held appeal hearings. In 2011, the Supreme Court too acquitted the accused.

In 2015, a massive child molesting crime in Pakistani history was discovered. About 280 were raped and filmed. Some of these rapists used these video clips to blackmail the parents of those children. Most of victims were below 14 years old. Malik Ahmed Saeed Khan, a member of Provincial Assembly (MPA) of Punjab, also a member of the ruling party, Pakistan Muslim League-Nawaz, was accused for his involvement in this series of crimes, including selling rape video clips (around 400 clips) to the international market.

=== Papua New Guinea ===
Papua New Guinea has a very high rate of sexual violence, which has been attributed to the interaction between a very male-dominated culture and a culture which is also very accepting of violence in day-to-day life. Marital rape was criminalized in 2003. According to a 1993 survey by the PNG Institute of Medical Research, an estimated 55% of Papua New Guinean women have experienced rape.

The United Nations Multi-country Study on Men and Violence found that 62% of men from Bougainville Island had raped a woman and 7.6% had raped a man. 14% had participated in gang rape. 7% said they had been raped by another man.

Non-partner rape was more commonly perpetrated than partner rape. 69.3% of the men who reported rape had raped more than once. 15.5% had raped four or more women or girls. 71% reported their motivation behind rape being sexual entitlement, 63% said they raped for entertainment, and 50% said they raped out of anger or to punish a woman. 52.2% had been jailed for their crime. Out of the nine areas surveyed, this was the highest rate of imprisonment.

=== Qatar ===
In Qatar, like in most countries in the Middle East, sex outside of marriage is illegal. Women who report rape or sexual violence risk being charged with "illicit relations". Amnesty International has reported that migrant domestic workers are at very high risk of sexual abuse. In 2012, the UN Committee against Torture made reference to "numerous allegations by migrant workers of physical abuse, sexual violence, rape and attempted rape".

=== Rwanda ===
The UN estimates that in Rwanda between 100,000 and 250,000 women were raped during the Rwandan genocide in 1994. Rape was used as a weapon of war, and there are numerous children who were born from these rapes. Many of the women who were raped were also infected with HIV/AIDS.

In 2009 Rwanda adopted a law (Law on prevention and punishment of Gender Based Violence) which recognizes, for the first time in the country's history, marital rape as a crime.

=== Saudi Arabia ===
Saudi Arabia has general crime rates 100 times lower than that of America. In 1981, the rates of forcible rape were 0.33 out of 100,000. Badr-el-din Ali suggests this may be due to Saudi Arabia having a synnomic state of culture, where everyone uncompromisingly shares the same values.

=== Somalia ===
In 2012, the reported nationwide prevalence rate ranged from 2% to 13%. Most incidents of sexual assault occurred within the context of the insurgency in southern Somalia. Over the first quarter of 2013, Amnesty International reported that 56.7% of victims in Mogadishu were internally displaced persons. According to the UN, there were at least 2,924 rape cases in IDP settlements in 2012. A third of the victims were under the age of 18. 70% of the perpetrators were armed men wearing uniforms, although it was not always clear whether they were members of militias, security forces or other individuals or groups. To address the issue, the central authorities as of December 2013 were in the process of forming a special crime unit to investigate and counter gender-based violence, as well as constructing a clinic set aside for victims of sexual assault. The national judiciary, security and police forces were all concurrently receiving specialized gender training as part of the broader reform effort. In June 2014, the Somali government also launched a National Action Plan against sexual violence in conjunction with local civil society groups.

=== South Africa ===
The Criminal Law (Sexual Offences and Related Matters) Amendment Act, 2007 is the relevant legislation in South Africa. Despite the fact that this act provides modern and progressive laws, that ban rape and other forms of sexual abuse, including sexual violence within marriage, South Africa remains a country where sexual attacks are common. The country has some of the highest incidences of child and baby rape in the world with more than 67,000 cases of rape and sexual assaults against children reported in 2000, with welfare groups believing that unreported incidents could be up to 10 times higher. In 2001, a nine-month-old was raped and likely lost consciousness as the pain was too much to bear. Another nine-month-old baby was raped by six men, aged between 24 and 66, after the infant had been left unattended by her teenage mother. A four-year-old girl died after being raped by her father. A 14-month-old girl was raped by her two uncles. In February 2002, an eight-month-old infant was reportedly gang raped by four men. One has been charged. The infant has required extensive reconstructive surgery. The eight-month-old infant's injuries were so extensive, increased attention on prosecution has occurred. A significant contributing factor for the escalation in child abuse is the widespread myth in HIV-ravaged South Africa that having sex with a virgin will cure a man of AIDS. According to official figures, circa 11% of South Africans are infected with the virus. Edith Kriel, a social worker who helps child victims in the Eastern Cape, said: "Child abusers are often relatives of their victims – even their fathers and providers."

One in three of the 4,000 women questioned by the Community of Information, Empowerment and Transparency said they had been raped in the past year. More than 25% of South African men questioned in a survey admitted to raping someone; of those, nearly half said they had raped more than one person, according to a new study conducted by the Medical Research Council (MRC). A 2010 study led by the government-funded Medical Research Foundation says that in Gauteng province, more than 37 percent of men said they had raped a woman. Nearly 7 percent of the 487 men surveyed said they had participated in a gang rape. Among children, a survey found 11% of boys and 4% of girls admitted to forcing someone else to have sex with them while in another survey among 1,500 schoolchildren in the Soweto township, a quarter of all the boys interviewed said that 'jackrolling', a term for gang rape, was fun.

In 2013 a study of 1991 grade nine boys at 46 secondary schools in Cape Town and Port Elizabeth found that 17.2% had raped.

South Africa has some of the highest incidences of child and baby rape in the world. More than 25% of a sample of 1,738 South African men from the KwaZulu-Natal and Eastern Cape Provinces admitted when anonymously questioned to raping someone; of those, nearly half said they had raped more than one person, according to a non-peer-reviewed policy brief issued by the Medical Research Council (MRC). 4.95% had raped or attempted rape in the past year at the time of the survey. Several news publications extrapolated these results to the rest of the South African population. The humanitarian news organization IRIN claims that an estimated 500,000 rapes are committed annually in South Africa.

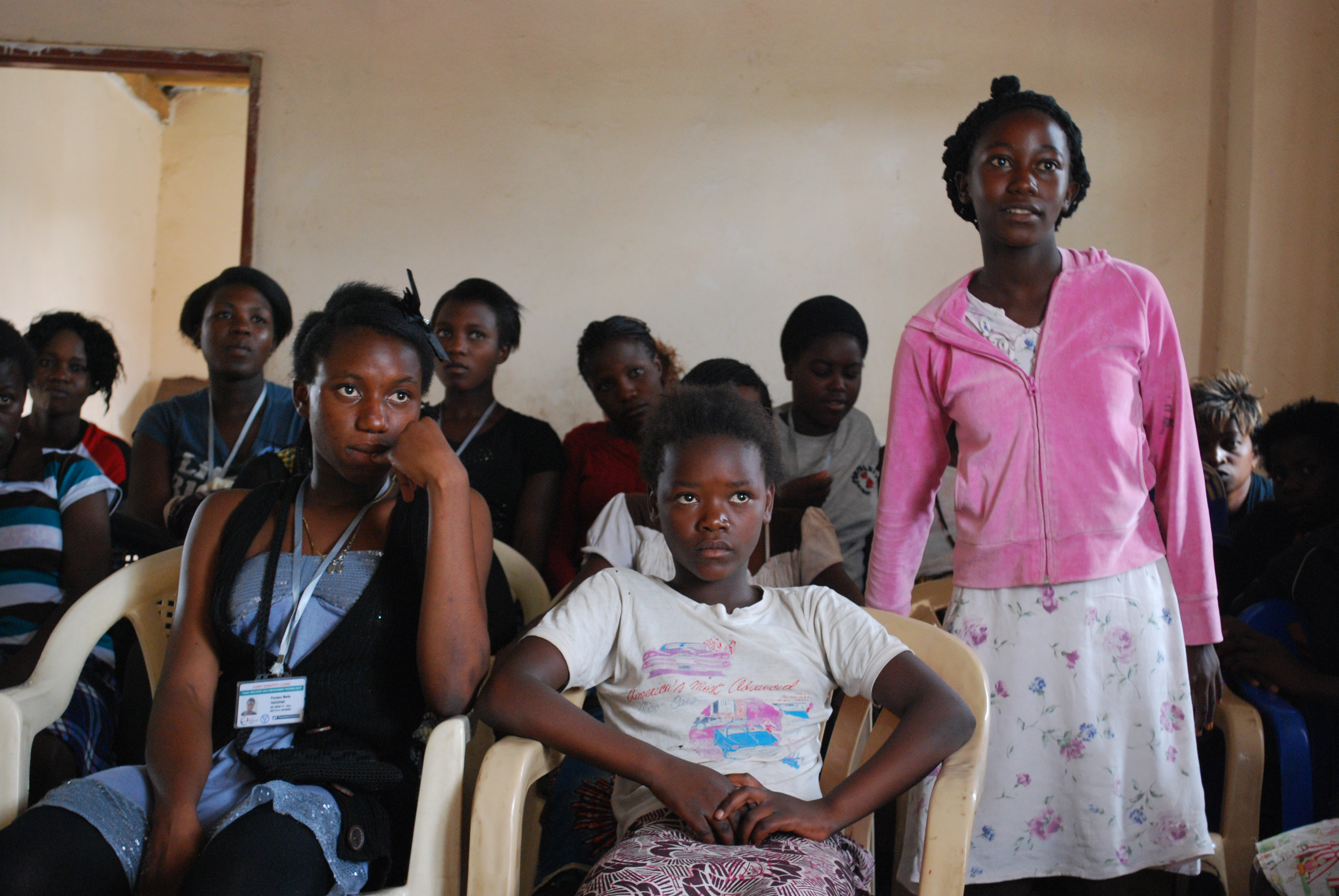
In a recent survey of schoolgirls in Lusaka, Zambia, 53% reported that girls in their school have experienced sexual harassment.

According to University of Durban-Westville anthropology lecturer and researcher Suzanne Leclerc-Madlala, the myth that sex with a virgin is a cure for AIDS is not confined to South Africa. "Fellow AIDS researchers in Zambia, Zimbabwe and Nigeria have told me that the myth also exists in these countries and that it is being blamed for the high rate of sexual abuse against young children."

"In South Africa, rape is so common it barely makes the news. The rapes of elderly women and babies are outlined in four-line stories on the inside pages of local newspapers, but most sexual assaults get no public attention."

In 2016, the police recorded 39,828 rapes which means rape rate of 71.3.

=== South Sudan ===
In South Sudan, marital rape is not criminalized; the law on rape excludes it from its definition by stating that "Sexual intercourse by a married couple is not rape, within the meaning of this section". (Art 247). Child marriage is common in the country, and this often leads to child sexual abuse; while the law on rape sets an age of consent of 18, this does not apply inside marriage. The Criminal Code criminalizes, among other behaviours, adultery and homosexuality. Amnesty International has stated that the security forces in South Sudan have shot and raped civilians while carrying out a civilian disarmament campaign in Jonglei State.

=== South Korea ===
In recent years, changes have been made to update South Korea's sex crime laws at the behest of President Park Geun-Hye, resulting in an increase in reported incidents. In 2015, reports of sexual assaults against foreigners were up 40% over 2008 numbers. Reports, apprehensions, and prosecutions have all risen with recent changes. However, victims often experience stigma due to traditional views of women's place in society and, although if convicted of rape an offender may be sentenced to between seven years and life in prison, convictions seldom result in a prison sentence.

=== Sri Lanka ===
In Sri Lanka there have been recent allegations that rape and torture by the Sri Lankan security forces have continued for years after the civil war ended. An average rape case in Sri Lanka takes 6 to 12 years to be resolved.

The UN Multi-country Study on Men and Violence found that 14.5% of the sample of Sri Lankan men had perpetrated rape at some point in their lives. 4.9% had raped in the past year. 2.7% had raped another man. 1.6% had taken part in a gang rape. 96.5% of the men who had raped experienced no legal consequences. 65.8% did not feel worried or guilty afterwards. 64.9% of rapists had raped more than once, and 11.1% had raped four or more girls or women.

=== Sudan ===
The law on rape states that: "There shall be deemed to commit the offence of rape, whoever makes sexual intercourse, by way of adultery, or sodomy, with any person without his consent".

Rape and other forms of sexual violence have been reported as being used on a large scale as a weapon of war in Darfur.

=== Sweden ===
A frequently cited source when comparing Swedish rape statistics internationally is the regularly published report by the United Nations Office on Drugs and Crime (UNODC), based on official statistics provided by each member state. (Note: For example, see Table 3.1 (Kelly et al., 2009)) In 2012, Sweden had 66 cases of reported rapes per 100,000 population, according to the Swedish National Council for Crime Prevention (Brå). This was unequivocally the biggest number reported to the UNODC in 2012. However, widely differing legal systems, offence definitions, terminological variations, recording practices and statistical conventions makes any cross-national comparison on rape statistics difficult, which is why the UNODC itself cautions against using their figures. It should also be noted that many countries do not report any rape statistics at all to the UNODC, and some report very low numbers, despite studies that indicate otherwise.

Comparison of selected countries' reported rape rates, 2012

The Swedish police record each instance of sexual violence in every case separately, leading to an inflated number of cases compared to other countries. Sweden also has a comparatively wide definition of rape. This means that more sexual crimes are registered as rape than in most other countries. For example, in 2005 Sweden reformed its sex crime legislation and made the legal definition of rape much wider, which led to a marked increase in reports. Additionally, the Swedish police have improved the handling of rape cases, in an effort to decrease the number of unreported cases. For this reason, large-scale victimization surveys have been presented by criminologists as a more reliable indicator of rape prevalence. An EU-wide survey on sexual violence against women, published by the European Union Agency for Fundamental Rights (FRA) in 2014, showed Sweden was only third highest, below Denmark and Finland and a previous assessment by Brå have placed Sweden at an average level among European nations.

According to the FRA study there is a strong correlation between higher levels of gender equality and disclosure of sexual violence. This, and a greater willingness among Swedish women to report rape in relationships, may also explain the relatively high rates of reported rape in Sweden, which has a long-standing tradition of gender equality policy and legislation, as well as an established women's movement, and has been ranked as the number one country in sex equality.

=== Syria ===
The Syrian Civil War has been associated with a high incidence of war rape, which has led to the stigmatization of victims by their relatives and communities, and in turn to honour killings, forced marriages, and child marriages. According to the Euro Mediterranean Human Rights Network (EMHRN), about 6,000 women have been raped since the start of the conflict.

=== Tanzania ===
In a survey of 1004 women (defined as 12 or older), 20% reported being raped in their lifetimes. 10% reported the event to police. In 92.4% of the events the perpetrator was known to the victim. There was no statistically significant difference between the rate of rape for women living in urban or suburban areas. 7% of the sample reported a rape occurring in the past two years. The socially closer the perpetrator, the lesser was the frequency of disclosure to either legal organs or other people, and vice versa. The prevalence of forced sexual initiation among women varied between 14% (province) and 17% (city), according to the WHO Multi-country Study on Women's Health and Domestic Violence against Women.

=== Turkey ===
In Turkey some commonly expressed views on rape were presented when individuals from various professions were asked to agree or disagree with the statement "some women deserve rape". Thirty-three to sixty-six percent of the police officers agreed with the statement as well as nearly 50% of other professional groups. The exception were the responses of psychologists about 18% and 27% of psychiatrists who agreed with the statement. Some of these suggested that "the physical appearance and behaviors of women tempt men to rape."

In 2013, The Guardian reported on claims by activists for the Kurdish terrorist group the PKK of widespread sexual abuse of prisoners allegedly used by the Turkish government to suppress dissent.

=== United Kingdom ===
The Sexual Offences Act 2003 (for England and Wales), the Sexual Offences (Scotland) Act 2009 and the Sexual Offences (Northern Ireland) Order 2008 are relevant legislative acts in the United Kingdom.

Unlike other jurisdictions, such as Australia, much of the US, and many Western countries, 'rape' in the UK is not a gender-neutral offence: it is an offence that can only be committed by a male against a person (female or male). Also the UK has not to date followed the trend in many Western countries of classifying acts other than penetration with a penis (e.g. penetration with an object, finger) as rape. These must be prosecuted under the other, equally severe, statute of assault by penetration.

The British Crime Survey 2000 found that 61,000 women were raped in England and Wales in 1999. It was also reported that approximately 754,000 women, over the age of 16, have been raped at least once in their lifetime. In 2001, the BCS (British Crime Survey) found that in the previous year, 47,000 women over the age of 16 were reported to have been raped.

The 2006–07 Crime Survey for England and Wales (formerly the British Crime Survey) reports that 1 in every 200 women were raped in that period. It also showed that only 800 people were convicted of rape crimes that same year, meaning that less than 1 in every 100 occurrences of rape led to a conviction. According to the 2015 Crime Survey for England and Wales, from January 2015 to Dec 2015, there were 34,000 incidences of rape.

According to the NCPCC, 1 in 20 children have been sexually abused in the UK. 12% of boys and 3% of girls reported committing sexual violence against their partners. In 2013, a Ministry of Justice report stated that only 15 per cent of victims of the most serious sexual offences reported the incident to the police.

A 2013 Rape Crisis survey found that one third of the 1000 women surveyed thought that if a woman did not fight back, then she could not have experienced rape. Meanwhile, 60% thought that a woman could not have experienced rape if she did not say 'no'.

According to the charity Rape Crisis 85,000 women and 12,000 men are raped each year in England and Wales, and only 15% of victims chose to report the crime to police.

In the year to the end of March 2020, 58,856 cases of rape were recorded by police forces in England and Wales. These led to just 2,102 prosecutions, compared with 3,043 in the previous 12 months.

Statistic on reported rape
| Source | Year of study | Number of female reported rapes in England and Wales |
| B. Toner | 1980 | 1,225 |
| Home Office Research Study 2005 | 2001 | 9,449 |
| Home Office Research Study 2005 | 2002 | 11,766 |
| Home Office research | 2003–04 | 12,354 |
| Home Office research | 2004–05 | 13,322 |

Over the years conviction rates have increased, however the UK remains as one of the countries with the lowest conviction rate for rape in Europe.

Statistics on female rape convictions
| Source | Year of Study | Reported rapes | Convictions and guilty pleas | Convictions as % of total reported rapes |
| B. Toner | 1980 | 1,225 | 416 | 34% |
| Home Office Research Study 2005 | 2001 | 9,449 | 572 | 6.05% |
| Home Office Research Study 2005 | 2002 | 11,766 | 655 | 5.6% |

=== United States ===
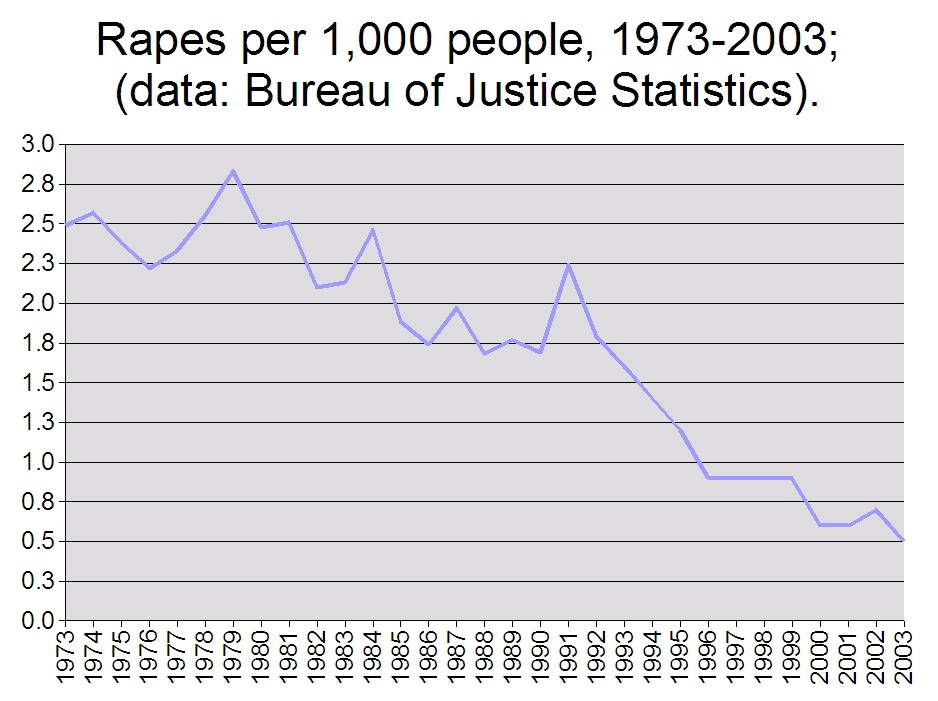
Rape rates in the U.S. per 1,000 people, 1973–2003

In 2011, the US Centers for Disease Control and Prevention (CDC) found that "nearly 20% of all women" in the United States suffered attempted rape or rape sometime in their lives. More than a third of the victims were raped before the age of 18.

The Centers for Disease Control and Prevention maintains recent statistics and standardized definitions upon which their statistics are based. A 2011 report on prison rape in the United States stated that "in 2008 there were at least 69,800 inmates who were raped under conditions involving force or threat of force, and more than 216,600 total victims of sexual abuse, in America's prisons, jails, and juvenile detention centers."

Data on the prevalence of rape vary greatly depending on what definition of rape is used. The FBI recorded 85,593 rapes in 2010. The Centers for Disease Control and Prevention reported nearly 1.3 million incidents that year. It should however be noted that the CDC's definition of rape "represents the public health perspective" and takes into account the ability of the victim to consent to sex because he or she had been drinking or taking drugs while the FBI defines rape as "Penetration, no matter how slight, of the vagina or anus with any body part or object, or oral penetration by a sex organ of another person, without the consent of the victim."

A 2007 survey by the National Institute of Justice found that 19.0% of college women and 6.1% of college men experienced either sexual assault or attempted sexual assault since entering college. In the University of Pennsylvania Law Review in 2017, D. Tuerkheimer reviewed the literature on rape allegations, and reported on the problems surrounding the credibility of rape victims, and how that relates to false rape accusations. She pointed to national survey data from the Centers for Disease Control and Prevention that indicates 1 in every 5 women (and 1 in 71 men) will be raped during their lifetime at some point. Despite the prevalence of rape and the fact that false rape allegations are rare, Tuerkheimer reported that law enforcement officers often default to disbelief about an alleged rape. This documented prejudice leads to reduced investigation and criminal justice outcomes that are faulty compared to other crimes. Tuerkheimer says that women face "credibility discounts" at all stages of the justice system, including from police, jurors, judges, and prosecutors. These credibility discounts are especially pronounced when the victim is acquainted with the accuser, and the vast majority of rapes fall into this category. The U.S. Department of Justice estimated from 2005 to 2007 that about 2% of victims who were raped while incapacitated (from drugs, alcohol, or other reasons) reported the rape to the police, compared to 13% of victims who experienced physically forced sexual assault.

The 1998 National Violence Against Women Survey, based on a sample size of 8,000, estimated the incidence of rape to be 1 in 6 for women and 1 in 33 for men, based on reports of attempted or completed rapes over the course of her or his lifetime.

A 1997 study on the non-institutionalized, non-military population by the U.S. Bureau of Justice Statistics, which defines rape as forced penetration by the offender, found that 91% of reported rape victims are female and 9% are male.

The majority of rapes in the United States go unreported. According to the American Medical Association (1995), sexual violence, and rape in particular, is considered the most under-reported violent crime. The US Bureau of Justice Criminal Victimization Statistics reports that up to 66.1% of rapes go unreported. Some of the most common reasons given by victims for not reporting rapes are when the victim considers it a personal or private matter, and the fear of reprisal from the assailant. Under-reporting affects the accuracy of this data.

A significant number of rapes reported to the police do not advance to prosecution. Twenty-five percent of reported rapes result in arrest. Only 16% of rapes and sexual assaults are reported to the police (Rape in America: A Report to the Nation. 1992 and United Nations Populations Fund, 2000a). Factoring in unreported rapes, about 5% of rapists will ever spend a day in jail.

Contrary to widespread belief, rape outdoors is rare. Over two thirds of all rapes occur in someone's home. 31% occur in the perpetrators' homes, 27% in the victims' homes and 10% in homes shared by the victim and perpetrator. 7% occur at parties, 7% in vehicles, 4% outdoors and 2% in bars. From 2000 to 2005, 59% of rapes were not reported to law enforcement. One factor relating to this is the misconception that most rapes are committed by strangers. In reality, studies indicate the following varying numbers:

| Source | Current or former intimate partner | Another relative | Acquaintance | Stranger |
|---|---|---|---|---|
| US Bureau of Justice statistics | 26% | 7% | 38% | 26% |
| Australian government statistics | 56% | 10% | 27% | 8% |
| UK Home Office (for comparison) | 45.4% | 13.9% | 29.6% | 11% |

In a 2012 news story, The New York Times reported, "according to a survey by the Alaska Federation of Natives, the rate of sexual violence in rural villages like Emmonak is as much as 12 times the national rate. And interviews with Native American women here and across the nation's tribal reservations suggest an even grimmer reality: They say few, if any, female relatives or close friends have escaped sexual violence." In a national survey conducted in the United States of America, 14.8% of women over 17 years of age reported having been raped in their lifetime (with an additional 2.8% having experienced attempted rape) and 0.3% of the sample reported having been raped in the previous year.

Drug use, especially alcohol, is frequently involved in rape. A study (only of rape victims that were female and reachable by phone) reported detailed findings related to tactics. In 47% of such rapes, both the victim and the perpetrator had been drinking. In 17%, only the perpetrator had been. 7% of the time, only the victim had been drinking. Rapes where neither the victim nor the perpetrator had been drinking were 29% of all rapes. Not only has it been a factor in the rates of sexual assault on campus, but because of the prevalence, assaults are also being affected specifically by the inability to give consent when intoxicated and bystanders not knowing when to intervene due to their own intoxication or the intoxication of the victim.

Koss, Gidycz and Wi published a study in 1987 where they interviewed approximately 6,000 college students on 32 college campuses nationwide. They asked several questions covering a wide range of behaviours. From this study, 15% of college women answered "yes" to questions about whether they experienced something that met the definition of rape. 12% of women answered "yes" to questions about whether they experienced something that met the definition of attempted rape. Moreover, depending on the region, 2-6% of the men interviewed admitted to rape. While the study focused on female victims and male perpetrators; it did not consider rape of men or rape in LGBT relationships.

In 1995, the CDC replicated part of this study with 8,810 students on 138 college campuses. They examined rape only, and did not look at attempted rape. They found that 20% of women and 4% of men had experienced rape in the course of her or his lifetime.

In 2000, the National Institute of Justice and the Bureau of Justice Statistics published a study called "The Sexual Victimization of College Women" based on a 1996–1997 survey. The study found that 3.1% of undergraduate women reported experiencing an act that met the researchers' definition of rape or attempted rape during a 6–7-month academic year. However, of those found to have experienced completed rape, only 46.5% of the victims answered that they considered the incident to be a rape, while 48.8% did not and 4.7% were unsure. The study also found that 10.1% of college women experienced rape and 10.9% experienced attempted rape prior to entering college. Victimization of men was not considered as part of this study.

In a different section of the report, the authors speculated about whether statistics during an academic year generalize to an entire college experience. For a full discussion, read more on page 10 of the report, stating that "the percentage of completed or attempted rape victimization among women in higher educational institutions might climb to between one-fifth and one-quarter" and further acknowledging in the corresponding footnote, #18, that "These projections are suggestive. To assess accurately the victimization risk for women throughout a college career, longitudinal research following a cohort of female students across time is needed."

80,000 American children are known to have been sexually abused each year. But unreported cases are higher, due to the fear among children. Over ninety percent of the time, the perpetrator is someone familiar or close with the child. Sexually violent crimes targeting children involve forced sexual activities such as intercourse, masturbation, and/or other explicit contact with a minor. According to Child Protective Services, eighty percent of the time, a parent ends up being the perpetrator. Children who become victims of this crime often end up developing phobias, depression, and post-traumatic stress disorder, as well as performing poorly in school. Sexually violent crimes of all ages occur often.

According to United States Department of Justice document Criminal Victimization in the United States, there were overall 191,670 victims of rape or sexual assault reported in 2005.

Myriam Denov (2004) states that societal responses to the issue of female perpetrators of sexual assault "point to a widespread denial of women as potential sexual aggressors that could work to obscure the true dimensions of the problem." Particularly as an increasing population of un-convicted felons and rapists who continue to insist that accusation of sexual assault is a punishment in lieu of justice through law enforcement agencies. It is thought that to be accused of rape brings shame to their families and social communities.

According to the National Crime Victimization Survey, the adjusted per-capita victimization rate of rape has declined from about 2.4 per 1000 people (age 12 and above) in 1980 to about 0.4 per 1000 people in 2006, a decline of about 85%. But other government surveys, such as the Sexual Victimization of College Women study, critique the NCVS on the basis it includes only those acts perceived as crimes by the victim, and report a higher victimization rate. Despite a decline of 60% since 1993, the US still has a relatively high rate of rape when compared to other developed countries.

RAINN asserts that from 2000 to 2005, 59% of rapes were not reported to law enforcement. For college students, the figure was 95% in 2000. One factor relating to this is the misconception that most rapes are committed by strangers. According to the Bureau of Justice Statistics, 38% of victims were raped by a friend or acquaintance, 28% by "an intimate" and 7% by another relative, and 26% were committed by a stranger to the victim. About four out of ten sexual assaults take place at the victim's own home.

=== Yemen ===
Yemen law does not recognize marital rape and does not provide a minimum age for marriage. The issues of child marriage and child rape inside marriage have made international news and have led to calls for legislative changes. There have been several reports of deaths of young girls due to violent rape by adult husbands, as well as young girls dying during childbirth. Human Rights Watch stated that "Child marriages and forced marriages remain widespread, exposing young girls to domestic violence and maternal mortality and truncating their education."

== See also ==
- Crime statistics
- Estimates of sexual violence
