= Victim study =

Survey of victims of crime

A victim study (or victimization survey or victimization study) is a survey, such as the British Crime Survey, that asks a sample of people which crimes have been committed against them over a fixed period of time and whether or not they have been reported to the police. Victim studies may be carried out at a national or local level.

Victim studies are canvasses of the public which request them to report any crimes which they have experienced, whether or not they have reported them. This is one of the main ways in which the dark figure of crime is exposed particularly in cases of abuse. Such surveys usually show the level of criminal activity is at least double that which appears in the official crime statistics.

Victimisation surveys are usually of two types:

- National survey - of a whole country in which people are asked to provide information on crimes which have been perpetrated against them. The British Crime Survey and the United States National Crime Victimization Survey are examples.
- Area or neighbourhood surveys - in which a specific, usually inner city, neighbourhood is targeted, and criminologists or sociologists engage in a more detailed study of the same issues. These small scale victim studies have been particularly associated with Left Realist criminology. For example, victim studies have been carried out in Islington in London by Jock Young, revealing a fear of crime amongst local residents that shapes much of their behaviour.

There is a third type of survey: The International Crime Victim Survey (ICVS) is a programme of standardised sample surveys to look at householders’ experience with crime, policing, crime prevention and feelings of unsafety in a large number of countries. International comparison is the main aim for this project.

A criticism of victim surveys is that there is no way of verifying information given by respondents.

== See also ==
- Criminology
- Victimization
- Policing in the United Kingdom
- The International Crime Victims Survey
