= Crime statistics =

Quantitative data on criminal behavior

Crime statistics quantitatively describe levels of criminal behaviour in society, but should not be thought of as objective measures of crime itself. Official statistics, or those generated by law enforcement agencies, report the crimes reported to police. They are reasonably accurate for crimes such as auto theft, but systematically underestimate under-reported crimes such as sexual assault.

To better estimate levels of crime, criminologists and other scholars conduct victimisation and self-offending surveys that ask the public about their direct experience of crime, as victims and offenders respectively. However, even these crime statistics are thought to underestimate actual levels.

Crimes unmeasured by crime statistics are called the dark figure of crime.

== Methods ==
There are three major methods for collecting crime data: official statistics, which count crimes reported to police; victimisation surveys, which ask representative samples of the population about crimes committed against them; and, self-offending surveys, which ask representative samples of the population about their own criminal behaviour.

=== Official statistics ===
Relatively few standards exist and none that permit international comparability beyond a very limited range of offences. As "only causing pain" is counted as assault in some countries. France was the contrasting exception having a high assault ratio without counting minor assaults.

The International Crime Victims Survey has been done in over 70 countries to date and has been a 'de facto' standard for defining common crimes. Complete list of countries participating and the 11 defined crimes can be found at the project web site.

In March 2015 the UNODC published the first version of the "International Classification of Crime for Statistical Purposes" (ICCS).

Attempts to use victimisation surveys from different countries for international comparison has failed in the past.

== Limitations ==
For less frequent crimes such as intentional homicide and armed robbery, reported incidents are generally more reliable than victimization or self-report studies, but suffer from under-recording; for example, no criming in the United Kingdom sees over one third of reported violent crimes being not recorded by the police.

The U.S. has two major data collection programs, the Uniform Crime Reports from the FBI and the National Crime Victimization Survey from the Bureau of Justice Statistics. However, the U.S. has no comprehensive infrastructure to monitor crime trends and report the information to related parties such as law enforcement.

Other measures:

- Recidivism
- Crime clearance rate, the percentage of crimes solved.
- Crime harm index, in which crimes are weighted based on how much "harm" they cause.

== International trends ==
Research using a series of victim surveys in 18 countries of the European Union, funded by the European Commission, has reported (2005) that the level of crime in Europe has fallen back to the levels of 1990, and notes that levels of common crime have shown declining trends in the U.S., Canada, Australia and other industrialized countries as well. The European researchers say a general consensus identifies demographic change as the leading cause for this international trend. Although homicide and robbery rates rose in the U.S. in the 1980s, by the end of the century they had declined by 40%.

However, the European research suggests that "increased use of crime prevention measures may indeed be the common factor behind the near universal decrease in overall levels of crime in the Western world", since decreases have been most pronounced in property crime and less so, if at all, in contact crimes.

== List of crime statistics ==
- Assault#Statistics
- Bribery#Statistics
- Burglary#Statistics
- Corruption#Statistics
- Domestic violence#By country
- Estimates of sexual violence#By country
- Fraud#Statistics
- Gang population
- Global Organized Crime Index
- Intimate partner sexual violence#Incidence by country
- Kidnapping#Statistics
- List of countries by intentional homicide rate
  - Homicide statistics by gender
- List of countries by incarceration rate
- List of countries with annual rates and counts for killings by law enforcement officers
- List of prison deaths
- Money laundering#Statistics
- Moral statistics
- Motor vehicle theft#Statistics
- People smuggling#Statistics
- Rape statistics
- Robbery#Robbery statistics
- Sexual assault#By country
- Theft#Statistics

=== By country ===
- Crime in the United States
- United States cities by crime rate
- Crime statistics in the United Kingdom

== See also ==
- Crime drop
- Crime science
- National Incident-Based Reporting System
- Statistical correlations of criminal behaviour
