= André-Michel Guerry =

French lawyer and statistician (1802–1866)

- Born: December 24, 1802; Tours, France
- Died: April 9, 1866 (aged 63); Paris
- Resting place: Montparnasse Cemetery
- Education: University of Poitiers
- Known for: Moral statistics
- Awards: Montyon Prize (statistics): 1833 & 1864

Signature
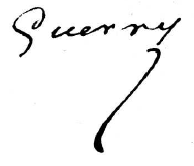

André-Michel Guerry (French: [ɡɛʁi]; December 24, 1802 – April 9, 1866) was a French lawyer and amateur statistician. Together with Adolphe Quetelet he may be regarded as the founder of moral statistics which led to the development of criminology, sociology and ultimately, modern social science.

== Early life and education ==
Guerry was born in Tours, Indre-et-Loire, the only child of Michel Guerry, a building contractor, whose family had a long history as innkeepers, merchants, farmers and trades-people. About 1817-1820 he studied at the Imperial College of Tours (now the Lyceum Descartes, founded in 1807) and subsequently studied law at the University of Poitiers.

About 1824–1825 he moved to Paris and was admitted to the bar as a royal advocate. Shortly after, he was employed by the Ministry of Justice. Guerry worked with the data on crime statistics in France collected as part of the General office for administration of criminal justice in France, the first centralized national system of crime reporting. Guerry was so fascinated with these data, and the possibility to discover empirical regularities and laws that might govern them, that he gave up the active practice of law to devote the rest of his life to study crime and its relation to other moral variables.

== Moral statistics and criminology ==
Guerry's first work on what would come to be called moral statistics was a large, one page sheet containing three shaded maps of France, prepared together with the Venetian geographer, Adriano Balbi in 1829. These showed the departments of France, shaded according to crimes against persons, crimes against property, and school instruction. Such statistical maps, now called choropleth maps had just been invented in 1826 by Baron Charles Dupin.

Guerry is best known for his Essay on moral statistics of France, presented to the French Academy of Sciences on July 2, 1832, and published in 1833 after it was awarded the Prix Montyon in statistics. His presentation, in tables and thematic maps, showed that rates of crime and suicide remained remarkably stable over time, when broken down by age, sex, region of France and even season of the year. Yet, these numbers also varied systematically across departments of France. This regularity of social numbers created the possibility to conceive that human actions could be described by social laws, just as inanimate actions were governed by physical laws.

Throughout his career, Guerry was particularly interested in uncovering the relation between social and moral variables. How are personal crime and property related to each other, and to suicide, donations to the poor, illegitimate births, wealth, and so forth? How do different types of crimes vary with age of the accused? Statistical methods (correlation and regression) were still in their infancy, so Guerry relied on graphic comparisons of maps and semi-graphic tables. Shown below are three of the six thematic maps that Guerry included in his Essay.

Personal crime	Property crime	Instruction

=== Suicide ===
In addition to a map of France showing rates of suicide by department, Guerry collected all the suicide notes found by the police in Paris over a four-year period. He classified these by the apparent motive expressed for taking one's life, perhaps the first content analysis in the social sciences.

=== Ordonnateur statistique ===
Around 1851, Guerry invented the Ordonnateur Statistique, probably the first mechanical device designed to aid in statistical calculations and the assessment of relationships among moral variables. This device is now known to have been used for sorting one target variable (e.g., crimes of different types) in relation to other possibly explanatory variables (e.g., population density).

=== Polar area diagram ===
In 1829, Guerry invented a new graphic form, the polar area diagram to show variations in weather and other phenomena over calendar cycles. This variation of the pie chart uses equi-angular sectors of differing radii, in contrast to the pie chart that uses sectors with varying angle, but equal radii. The polar area diagram is often mistakenly credited to Florence Nightingale, who used it to great effect to illustrate needless mortality in the Crimean War due to unsanitary medical conditions. Nightingale most probably got the idea from William Farr, who in turn was acquainted with Guerry's work.

=== Other activities ===
Guerry also resided in Beaumont-sur-Dême, where he was mayor of the village from 1846 to 1855.

== Major works ==
- Balbi, Adriano, and André-Michel Guerry. 1829. Statistique comparée de l'état de l'instruction et du nombre des crimes dans les divers arrondissements des Académies et des Cours Royales de France. Paris. Image
- Guerry, André-Michel. 1829. Mémoire sur les variations méterologiques comparées aux phénomènes physiologiques. Annales d'Hygiène Publique et de Médecine Légal 1:228.
- Guerry, André-Michel. 1832. Statistique comparée de l’état de l’instruction et du nombre des crimes. Paris: Everat Gallica
- Guerry, André-Michel. 1832. Motifs des crimes capitaux, d’apres les comptes de l’administration de la justice criminelle. Annales d’Hygiène Publique et de Médecine Légale, 8, 335–346.
- Guerry, André-Michel. 1833. Essai sur la statistique morale de la France. Paris: Crochard. Gallica
- Guerry, André-Michel. 1864. Statistique morale de l'Angleterre comparée avec la statistique morale de la France, d'après les comptes de l'administration de la justice criminelle en Angleterre et en France, etc. Paris: J.-B. Baillière et fils.
