= Gang population =

Reports on the number of people involved in criminal gangs, by locale

Reports on the number of people involved in criminal gangs, by locale.

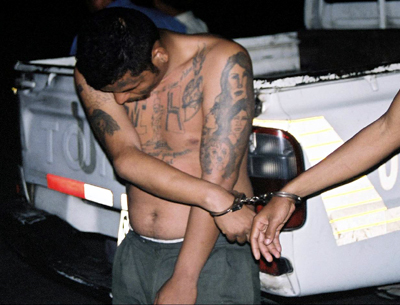
Mara Salvatrucha suspect bearing gang tattoos is handcuffed. In 2009; the FBI created the MS-13 National Gang Task Force to combat gang activity in the United States. A year later, the FBI helped create National Gang Intelligence Center.

== United States ==
There were at least 30,000 gangs and 800,000 gang members active across the US in 2007, and an estimated 1.4 million in 33,000 gangs in 2011. About 900,000 gang members lived "within local communities across the country", and about 147,000 were in U.S. prisons or jails in 2009. By 1999, Hispanics accounted for 47% of all gang members, Blacks 31%, Whites 13%, and Asians 6%.

The Latin Kings have organized chapters in over 41 US states, most notably Illinois, and several Latin American and European countries, including: Mexico, Spain, Dominican Republic, Canada, Italy, Ecuador, Peru, Puerto Rico, Portugal, Brazil, United Kingdom and others.

=== Chicago ===
The Chicago Crime Commission publication "The Gang Book 2012" gave the statistic that Chicago has more gang members than any other city in the world with a reported population of 150,000. The city had 532 murders in 2012, however, it saw a decrease to 403 murders in 2013, but up to 762 in 2016. Not all murders are gang-related, but the Chicago Police Department states that 80% of all shootings and murders in the city are gang-related.

=== Los Angeles ===
Los Angeles has held the nickname "gang capital America" since 1930 because approximately 120,000 gang members reside in the city, and tens of thousands more in surrounding Los Angeles County.

== Latin America ==
There are between 25,000 and 50,000 gang members in Central America's El Salvador.

The Mexican drug cartels have as many as 100,000 foot soldiers, many of them in the Los Angeles area.

Gangs controlled approximately 40% of Haiti's Port-au-Prince in 2022.

== Asia ==
The Yakuza are among the largest organized crime organizations in the world. In Japan, as of 2005, there are some 86,300 known members.

Hong Kong's Triads include up to 160,000 members in the 21st century. It was estimated that in the 1950s, there were 300,000 Triad members in Hong Kong. The Chinese government claims that police have eliminated 1,221 triad-style gangs across China since a crackdown was launched in 2006. More than 87,300 suspects have been arrested.

== Europe ==
The FBI estimates the size of the four Italian organized crime groups to be approximately 25,000 members and 250,000 affiliates worldwide.

== Oceania ==
=== Australia ===
In 2013, the Australian Crime Commission listed 4,483 outlaw motorcycle (OMC) gang members in 179 chapters of 44 OMC gangs. An assessment by the Australian Criminal Intelligence Commission in September 2020 identified over 4,700 patched gang members and 1,000 prospects in 38 OMCGs.

=== New Zealand ===
In June 2021 there were 8,061 gang members, across 25 gangs, according to information obtained from the New Zealand Gang Intelligence Centre, which holds the National Gang List. This figure is almost double the 4,420 gang members, of 24 gangs, on the list in 2016. NZ Police attribute some of the increase to better methodology and recording processes but also noted that those who cease to be involved in a gang might not be removed from the list. On February 25, 2021, the NZ Police commissioner, Andrew Coster, advised the Justice Select Committee that he considered gang membership numbers derived from the gang list were inaccurate because it was easy for someone to be added to the list but difficult for them to be removed, short of death.

== See also ==
- Crime statistics
- Prison gang
- Gang signal

By country:

- List of gangs in the United States
- Gangs in Australia
- Gangs in Canada
- Gangs in the United Kingdom
- Gangs in New Zealand
