= Victimisation =

Process of being or subjected to a victim

Victimisation (or victimization) is the state or process of being victimised or becoming a victim. The field that studies the process, rates, incidence, effects, and prevalence of victimisation is called victimology.

== Peer victimisation ==
Peer victimisation is the experience among children of being a target of the aggressive behaviour of other children, who are not siblings and not necessarily age-mates. Peer victimisation is correlated with an increased risk of depression and decreased well-being in adulthood.

== In the workplace ==
In UK employment equality law, victimisation refers to unfavourable treatment towards an employee due to their having carried out a protected act in relation to the Equality Act 2010 (such as raising a grievance about discrimination or harassment). The legal concept of victimisation may have been influenced by US and EU law. Claims of victimisation function similarly to claims of direct discrimination, except that the "proscribed ground" (the reason for the unlawful treatment) is not a protected characteristic but the fact that the victim has exercised their statutory rights under the Equality Act. It is not necessary for the perpetrator of the unlawful treatment to have stated that the victim's protected act was the reason for the treatment, nor for it to be the only reason.

A protected act under UK law is:

1. making a claim or complaint of discrimination
2. helping someone else to make a claim by giving evidence or information
3. making an allegation that someone has breached the Equality Act
4. doing anything else in connection with the Equality Act.

Case law, in particular appeal outcomes, suggests a somewhat wider working definition of "protected act" (within the "anything else" criterion above) which may include opting into a positive action scheme or taking steps to ensure the employer's compliance with the Equality Act.

Australian law defines victimisation more broadly, covering unfavourable treatment against employees who have raised any complaint under the Fair Work Act 2009 or under state laws like Victoria's Equal Opportunity Act 2010.

== Secondary victimisation ==
Secondary victimization (also known as post crime victimization or double victimization) refers to further victim-blaming from criminal justice authorities following a report of an original victimization.

== Revictimisation ==
The term revictimisation refers to a pattern wherein the victim of abuse and/or crime has a statistically higher tendency to be victimised again, either shortly thereafter or much later in adulthood in the case of abuse as a child. This latter pattern is particularly notable in cases of sexual abuse. While an exact percentage is almost impossible to obtain, samples from many studies suggest the rate of revictimisation for people with histories of sexual abuse is very high. The vulnerability to victimisation experienced as an adult is also not limited to sexual assault, and may include physical abuse as well.

Reasons as to why revictimisation occurs vary by event type, and some mechanisms are unknown. Revictimisation in the short term is often the result of risk factors that were already present, which were not changed or mitigated after the first victimisation; sometimes the victim cannot control these factors. Examples of these risk factors include living or working in dangerous areas, chaotic familial relations, having an aggressive temperament, drug or alcohol usage and unemployment. Revictimisation may be "facilitated, tolerated, and even produced by particular institutional contexts, illustrating how the risk of revictimization is not a characteristic of the individual, nor is it destiny."

Revictimisation of adults who were previously sexually abused as children is more complex. Multiple theories exist as to how this functions. Some scientists propose a maladaptive form of learning; the initial abuse teaches inappropriate beliefs and behaviours that persist into adulthood. The victim believes that abusive behaviour is "normal" and comes to expect, or feel they deserve it from others in the context of relationships, and thus may unconsciously seek out abusive partners or cling to abusive relationships. Another theory draws on the principle of learned helplessness. As children, they are put in situations that they have little to no hope of escaping, especially when the abuse comes from a caregiver. One theory goes that this state of being unable to fight back or flee the danger leaves the last primitive option: freeze, an offshoot of death-feigning.

Revictimisation has also been characterized as a phenomenon whereby the children depicted in child pornography have a feeling of the depicted event reoccurring every single time the image is viewed. Each time the image is viewed, the children relive the experience as if it were happening all over again. As the images are viewed over and over again, this leaves the children feeling, or being as if they were, raped all over again.

== Offenders choosing pre-traumatized victims ==
In adulthood, the freeze response can remain, and some professionals have noted that victimisers sometimes seem to pick up subtle clues of this when choosing a victim. This behaviour can make the victim an easier target, as they sometimes make less effort to fight back or vocalise. Afterwards, they often make excuses and minimise what happened to them, sometimes never reporting the assault to the authorities.

== Self-victimisation ==
Self-victimisation (or victim playing) is the fabrication of victimhood for a variety of reasons, such as to justify real or perceived abuse of others, to manipulate others, as a coping strategy, or for attention seeking. In a political context, self-victimisation could also be seen as an important political tool within post-conflict, nation-building societies. While failing to produce any affirmative values, the fetishistic lack of future is masked up by an excess of confirmation of its own status of victimhood, as noted by the Bosnian political theoretician Jasmin Hasanović, seeing it in the post-Yugoslav context as a form of auto-colonialism, where reproducing the narrative of victimhood corresponds with the balkanization stereotypes, being the very narrative of the colonizer where the permanence of war is the contemporaneity of fear, affirming the theses on eternal hatred thus strengthening ethnonationalism even more.

== Self-image of victimisation (victim mentality) ==
Victims of abuse and manipulation sometimes get trapped into a self-image of victimisation. The psychological profile of victimisation includes a pervasive sense of helplessness, passivity, loss of control, pessimism, negative thinking, strong feelings of guilt, shame, self-blame and depression. This way of thinking can lead to hopelessness and despair.

== By country ==
=== Kazakhstan ===
At the end of 2012, the first-ever victimisation survey of 219,500 households (356,000 respondents) was conducted by the State Statistics Agency at the request of Marat Tazhin, the head of the Security Council and a sociologist by training. According to the survey, 3.5% of respondents reported being a victim of crime in the previous 12 months, and only half of those said that they had reported the crime to the police. The presidential administration chose not to release any further details from this survey to the public.

In May–June 2018, the first International Crime Victims Survey (ICVS) of nationally representative sample of 4,000 persons was conducted in Kazakhstan. It showed low levels of victimisation. The overall violent crime victimisation rate among the population in a one-year period was 3.7%. Rates of violent victimisation by strangers were somewhat higher among females (2.1%) than among males (1.8%). The rates of violence by persons known to them were as much as three times higher for women than for men (2.8% for females and 0.8% for males). In a one-year period, the highest rates of victimisation were consumer fraud (13.5% of respondents), theft from the car and personal theft (6.3% of respondents), and official bribe-seeking (5.2% of respondents). In almost half of bribe-seeking cases the bribe-seeker was a police officer. Taking only the adult population of Kazakhstan into account, the ICVS police bribery figures suggest around 400,000 incidents of police bribery every year in Kazakhstan. These calculations are most likely very conservative in that they only capture when a bribe has been solicited and exclude instances of citizen-initiated bribery. The ICVS revealed extremely low levels of reporting crime to the police. Only one in five crimes were reported to the police in Kazakhstan, down from the 46% reporting rate recorded in the government-conducted 2012 survey.

=== United States ===
Levels of criminal activity are measured through three major data sources: the Uniform Crime Reports (UCR), self-report surveys of criminal offenders, and the National Crime Victimization Survey (NCVS). However, the UCR and self-report surveys generally report details regarding the offender and the criminal offense; information on the victim is only included so far as his/her relationship to the offender, and perhaps a superficial overview of his/her injuries. The NCVS is a tool used to measure the existence of actual, rather than only those reported, crimes—the victimisation rate—by asking individuals about incidents in which they may have been victimised. The National Crime Victimization Survey is the United States' primary source of information on crime victimisation.

Each year, data is obtained from a nationally represented sample of 77,200 households comprising nearly 134,000 persons on the frequency, characteristics and consequences of criminal victimisation in the United States. This survey enables the (government) to estimate the likelihood of victimisation by rape (more valid estimates were calculated after the surveys redesign in 1992 that better tapped instances of sexual assault, particularly of date rape), robbery, assault, theft, household burglary, and motor vehicle theft for the population as a whole as well as for segments of the population such as women, the elderly, members of various racial groups, city dwellers, or other groups. According to the Bureau of Justice Statistics (BJS), the NCVS reveals that, from 1994 to 2005, violent crime rates have declined, reaching the lowest levels ever recorded. Property crimes continue to decline.

In 2010, the National Institute of Justice reported that American adolescents were the age group most likely to be victims of violent crime, while American men were more likely than American women to be victims of violent crime, and blacks were more likely than Americans of other races to be victims of violent crime. Overall, black men were most likely to be victims of violent crime.

== See also ==
- Anti-social behaviour
- Blame
- Bullying
- Crime
- Dehumanisation
- Destabilisation
- Frontier justice
- Happy victimizing
- Just-world fallacy
- Mobbing
- Post-assault treatment of sexual assault victims
- Public criminology
- Race card
- Scapegoating
- Symptoms of victimization
- United Kingdom employment discrimination law
- Victim blaming
- Victim playing
- Victimization and emotional intelligence
- Violent crime
