= Moral statistics =

Moral statistics most narrowly refers to numerical data generally considered to be indicative of social pathology in groups of people. Examples include statistics on crimes (against persons and property), illiteracy, suicide, illegitimacy, abortion, divorce, prostitution, and the economic situation sometimes called pauperism in the 19th century.

The gathering of anything that might be called social statistics is often dated from John Graunt’s (1662) analysis of the London Bills of Mortality, which tabulated birth and death data collected by London parishes. The beginnings of the systematic collection of population statistics (now called demography) occurred in the mid-18th century, often attributed to Johann Peter Süssmilch in 1741. Data on moral variables began to be collected and disseminated by various state agencies (most notably in France and Britain) in the early 19th century, and were widely used in debates about social reform.

The first major work on this topic was the Essay on moral statistics of France by André-Michel Guerry in 1833. In this book, Guerry presented thematic maps of the departments of France, shaded according to illiteracy, crimes against persons and against property, illegitimacy, donations to the poor and so forth, and used these to ask questions about how such moral variables were related.

In Britain this theme was taken up beginning in 1847 by Joseph Fletcher who published several articles on the topic Moral and educational statistics of England and Wales.
