= Estimates of sexual violence =

Prevalence of violent sexual crime

Estimates of sexual violence are surveys of victims of sexual violence crime that have been undertaken to estimate the prevalence of sexual violence. The prevalence of sexual violence differs from the reported sexual violence statistics according to the law enforcement agencies due to the dark figure of crime and under-reporting of crime. The surveys use a common methodology to aid comparability.

== Overview ==
The United Nations has conducted extensive surveys to determine the level of sexual violence in different societies. According to these studies, the percentage of women reporting having been a victim of sexual assault ranges from less than 2% in places such as La Paz, Bolivia (1.4%), Gaborone, Botswana (0.8%), Beijing, China (1.6%), and Manila, Philippines (0.3%), to 5% or more in Istanbul, Turkey (6.0%), Buenos Aires, Argentina (5.8%), Rio de Janeiro, Brazil (8.0%), and Bogotá, Colombia (5.0%).

=== Rape ===
The 1998 National Violence Against Women Survey, based on a sample size of 8,000, estimated the incidence of rape to be 1 in 6 for women and 1 in 33 for men, based on reports of attempted or completed rapes over the course of her or his lifetime.

No distinction has been made in these figures between rape by strangers and that by intimate partners. Surveys that fail to make this distinction or those that only examine rape by strangers usually underestimate substantially the prevalence of sexual violence.

In 2011, the US Centers for Disease Control and Prevention (CDC) found that "nearly 20% of all women" in the United States suffered attempted rape or rape sometime in their lives. More than a third of the victims were raped before the age of 18.

Apart from crime surveys, there have been a small number of surveys, with representative samples, that have asked women about sexual violence. For instance, in a national survey conducted in the United States, 14.8% of women over 17 years of age reported having been raped in their lifetime (with an additional 2.8% having experienced attempted rape) and 0.3% of the sample reported having been raped in the previous year. A survey of a representative sample of women aged 18–49 years in three provinces of South Africa found that in the previous year 1.3% of women had been forced, physically or by means of verbal threats, to have non-consensual sex. In a survey of a representative sample of the general population over 15 years of age in the Czech Republic, 11.6% of women reported forced sexual contact in their lifetime, 3.4% reporting that this had occurred more than once. The most common form of contact was forced vaginal intercourse.

== Sexual violence by intimate partners ==
=== Forced sexual initiation ===
A growing number of studies, particularly from sub-Saharan Africa, indicate that the first sexual experience of girls is sometimes unwanted and forced. In a case control study, for example, of 191 adolescent girls (mean age 16.3 years) attending an antenatal clinic in Cape Town, South Africa, and 353 non pregnant adolescents matched for age and neighborhood or school, 31.9% of the study cases and 18.1% of the controls reported that force was used during their sexual initiation. When asked about the consequences of refusing sex, 77.9% of the study cases and 72.1% of the controls said that they feared being beaten if they refused to have sex.

Forced sexual initiation and coercion during adolescence have been reported in many studies of young women and men. Where studies have included both men and women in the sample, the prevalence of reported rape or sexual coercion has been higher among the women than the men. For example, nearly half of the sexually active adolescent women in a multi-country study in the Caribbean reported that their first sexual intercourse was forced, compared with one-third of the adolescent men. In Lima, Peru, the percentage of young women reporting forced sexual initiation was almost four times that reported by the young men (40% against 11%, respectively).

There are not many studies of forced sexual initiation in the United States, and estimates from the studies that do exist vary widely. One study of 5,663 heterosexual women in the United States found that 12.5% had experienced forced sexual initiation. Of the women who were 15 years old or younger when they had their first sexual experience, 22% reported that those initiations were forced. In the 1992 US National Health and Social Life Survey of over 3,400 adults, more than 4% of women reported coerced sexual initiation.

In a study of over 24,000 women, the World Health Organization found the following rates of women reporting forced sexual initiation: 30% in a Bangladesh province, 24% in a Bangladesh city, 24% in a Peru province, 17% in an Ethiopia province, 17% in a United Republic of Tanzania province, 14% in a United Republic of Tanzania city, 8% in Samoa, 7% in a Peru city, 6% in a Namibia city, 5% in a Brazil province, 4% in a Thailand city, 3% in a Brazil city, 0.7% in a Serbia and Montenegro city, and 0.4% in a Japan city. In all of these sites except Ethiopia, the younger the woman was at the time of her first sexual experience, the more likely it was that that experience was forced sexual initiation.

=== Gang rape ===
Gang rape, or mass rape, occurs when a group of people participate in the rape of a single victim. Rape involving at least two or more perpetrators is widely reported to occur in many parts of the world.

=== Sexual trafficking ===
Each year hundreds of thousands of women and girls throughout the world are bought and sold into prostitution or sexual slavery. Internationally, the most common destinations for victims of human trafficking are Thailand, Japan, Israel, Belgium, the Netherlands, Germany, Italy, Turkey and the United States, according to a report by the United Nations Office on Drugs and Crime (UNODC).

Research in Kyrgyzstan has estimated that around 4,000 people were trafficked from the country in 1999, with the principal destinations being China, Germany, Kazakhstan, the Russian Federation, Turkey and the United Arab Emirates. Of those trafficked, 62% reported being forced to work without pay, while over 50% reported being physically abused or tortured by their employers.

A World Organization against Torture (OMCT) report suggested that more than 200,000 Bangladeshi women had been trafficked between 1990 and 1997. Over 200,000 Nepali girls have been trafficked to red light areas of India, and trafficking of Thai women to Japan has also been reported. Trafficking of women also takes place internally within some countries, often from rural areas to cities.

In recent years, the problem of human trafficking has gotten very serious in Europe, where women from Eastern Europe, as well as from Asia, Africa and Latin America are trafficked to Western Europe. In Netherlands, it is estimated that there are from 1,000 to 7,000 trafficking victims a year. Most police investigations relate to legal sex businesses, with all sectors of prostitution being well represented, but with window brothels being particularly overrepresented. In 2008, there were 809 registered trafficking victims, 763 were women and at least 60 percent of them were forced to work in the sex industry. All victims from Hungary were female and were forced into prostitution. Out of all Amsterdam's 8,000 to 11,000 prostitutes, more than 75% are from Eastern Europe, Africa and Asia, according to a former prostitute who produced a report about the sex trade in Amsterdam, in 2008. An article in Le Monde in 1997 found that 80% of prostitutes in the Netherlands were foreigners and 70% had no immigration papers. In 2020, investigative journalists from Argos and Lost in Europe, found that the Dutch government had known for over five years that Vietnamese children go missing from protected shelters in The Netherlands, sparking fears of trafficking. In 2015, Argos stated, four Vietnamese girls went missing from a shelter, carrying brown suitcases of the same brand, "a lot of cash and phones without sim cards". Two of the minors carried "sexy lingerie" in their suitcases.

In Germany, the trafficking of women from Eastern Europe is often organized by people from that same region. The German Federal Police Office (BKA) reported in 2006 a total of 357 completed investigations of human trafficking, with 775 victims. Thirty-five percent of the suspects were Germans born in Germany and 8% were German citizens born outside of Germany.

North America is also an important destination for international trafficking. A study undertaken under the auspices of the United States Central Intelligence Agency estimated that 45,000 to 50,000 women and children are trafficked annually to the United States. Over 150 cases of trafficking were prosecuted between 1996 and 1999 by the United States Department of Justice. In 2004, the Royal Canadian Mounted Police (RCMP) estimated that 600-800 persons are trafficked into Canada annually and that additional 1,500–2,200 persons are trafficked through Canada into the United States. In Canada, foreign trafficking for prostitution is estimated to be worth $400 million annually.

=== Sexual violence against sex workers ===
Whether trafficked or not, sex workers are at high risk for both physical and sexual violence, particularly where sex work is illegal. A survey of female sex workers in Leeds, England, and Glasgow and Edinburgh, Scotland, revealed that 30% had been slapped, punched or kicked by a client while working, 13% had been beaten, 11% had been raped and 22% had experienced an attempted rape. Only 34% of those who had suffered violence at the hands of a client reported it to police.

A survey of sex workers in Bangladesh revealed that 49% of the women had been raped and 59% beaten by police in the previous year; the men reported much lower levels of violence. In Ethiopia, a study of sex workers also found high rates of physical and sexual violence from clients, especially against the child sex workers.

=== Stalking ===
Stalking victimization involves a pattern of harassing or threatening tactics used by a perpetrator that is both unwanted and causes fear or safety concerns in the victim. According to the CDC's The National Intimate Partner and Sexual Violence Survey from 2015, 1 in 6 women in the U.S. were a victim of stalking at one point in her lifetime. The survey also found that about 1 in 17 men were victims of stalking at some point in their lives.

== Sexual violence in schools, health care settings, armed conflicts, prisons, and refugee settings ==
=== Schools ===
For many young women, the most common place where sexual coercion and harassment are experienced is in school. In an extreme case of violence in 1991, 71 teenage girls were raped by their classmates and 19 others were killed at a boarding school in Meru, Kenya. While much of the research in this field comes from Africa, it is not clear whether this reflects a particularly high prevalence of the problem or simply the fact that the problem has had a greater visibility there than in other parts of the world.

Harassment of girls by boys is in all likelihood a global problem. In Canada, for example, 23% of girls had experienced sexual harassment while attending school. A 2007 survey by the National Institute of Justice found that 19.0% of college women and 6.1% of college men experienced either sexual assault or attempted sexual assault since entering college. In the University of Pennsylvania Law Review in 2017, D. Tuerkheimer reviewed the literature on rape allegations, and reported on the problems surrounding the credibility of rape victims, and how that relates to false rape accusations. She pointed to national survey data from the Centers for Disease Control and Prevention that indicates 1 in every 5 women (and 1 in 71 men) will be raped during their lifetime at some point. Despite the prevalence of rape and the fact that false rape allegations are rare, Tuerkheimer reported that law enforcement officers often default to disbelief about an alleged rape. This documented prejudice leads to reduced investigation and criminal justice outcomes that are faulty compared to other crimes. Tuerkheimer says that women face "credibility discounts" at all stages of the justice system, including from police, jurors, judges, and prosecutors. These credibility discounts are especially pronounced when the victim is acquainted with the accuser, and the vast majority of rapes fall into this category. The U.S. Department of Justice estimated from 2005 to 2007 that about 2% of victims who were raped while incapacitated (from drugs, alcohol, or other reasons) reported the rape to the police, compared to 13% of victims who experienced physically forced sexual assault.

The research done in Africa, however, has highlighted the role of teachers there in facilitating or perpetrating sexual coercion. A report by Africa Rights found cases of schoolteachers attempting to gain sex, in return for good grades or for not failing pupils, in the Democratic Republic of the Congo, Ghana, Nigeria, Somalia, South Africa, Sudan, Zambia and Zimbabwe. A recent national survey in South Africa that included questions about experience of rape before the age of 15 years found that schoolteachers were responsible for 32% of disclosed child rapes. In Zimbabwe, a retrospective study of reported cases of child sexual abuse over an 8-year period (1990 to 1997) found high rates of sexual abuse committed by teachers in rural primary schools. Many of the victims were girls between 11 and 13 years of age and penetrative sex was the most prevalent type of sexual abuse.

In their 2002 survey, the AAUW reported that, of students who had been harassed, 38% were harassed by teachers or other school employees. One survey that was conducted with psychology students reports that 10% had sexual interactions with their educators; in turn, 13% of educators reported sexual interaction with their students. In a national survey conducted for the American Association of University Women Educational Foundation in 2000, it was found that roughly 290,000 students experienced some sort of physical sexual abuse by a public school employee between 1991 and 2000. A major 2004 study commissioned by the U.S. Department of Education found that nearly 10 percent of U.S. public school students reported having been targeted with sexual attention by school employees. Charol Shakeshaft, a researcher in the field, claimed that sexual abuse in public schools "is likely more than 100 times the abuse by priests."

A secondary analysis of a series of surveys conducted for the AAUW and administered to a representative sample of 2,064 8th through 11th-grade American students in 2000 showed that 9.6% of the students reported educator sex abuse. The students were asked if and how often they had experienced 14 types of behaviors which constitute sexual harassment. They then indicated who harassed them (students, teachers, school employees). Nonphysical sexual abuse (e.g., making sexual jokes) was more prevalent than physical abuse (8.7 and 6.7%). Girls were more likely to report educator sexual harassment than boys (10.3 and 8.8%). 12.3% of black, 12.2% of Latino, 8.4% of white and 1.8% of Asian students indicated that they had experienced sexual harassment by teachers. In 1995, the CDC replicated part of this study with 8,810 students on 138 college campuses. They examined rape only, and did not look at attempted rape. They found that 20% of women and 4% of men had experienced rape in the course of her or his lifetime.

On campuses, it has been found that alcohol is a prevalent issue in regards to sexual assault. It has been estimated that 1 in 5 women experience an assault, and of those women, 50–75% have had either the attacker, the woman, or both, consume alcohol prior to the assault. Not only has it been a factor in the rates of sexual assault on campus, but because of the prevalence, assaults are also being affected specifically by the inability to give consent when intoxicated and bystanders not knowing when to intervene due to their own intoxication or the intoxication of the victim.

=== Health care settings ===
Sexual violence against patients in health facilities has been reported in many places. A study of physicians disciplined for sexual offences in the United States, for instance, found that the number of cases had increased from 42 in 1989 to 147 in 1996, with the proportion of all disciplinary action that was sex-related rising from 2.1% to 4.4% over the same period. This increase, though, could reflect a greater readiness to lodge complaints.

Other documented forms of sexual violence against female patients include the involvement of medical staff in the practice of clitoridectomy in Egypt, forced gynecological examinations and the threat of forced abortions in China, and inspections of virginity in Turkey. Sexual violence is part of the broader problem of violence against women patients perpetrated by health workers that has been reported in a large number of countries and until recently has been much neglected. Sexual harassment of female nurses by male doctors has also been reported.

=== Armed conflicts and refugee settings ===
Rape has been used as a strategy in many conflicts, including in Korea during the Second World War and in Bangladesh during the war of independence, as well as in a range of armed conflicts such as those in Algeria, India (Kashmir), Indonesia, Liberia, Rwanda and Uganda. In some armed conflicts, for example, the ones in Rwanda and the states of the former Yugoslavia rape has been used as a deliberate strategy to subvert community bonds and thus the perceived enemy, and furthermore as a tool of ethnic cleansing.

In East Timor, there were reports of extensive sexual violence against women by the Indonesian military. A study in Monrovia, Liberia, found that women under 25 years were more likely than those aged 25 years and over to report experiencing attempted rape and sexual coercion during the conflict (18% compared with 4%). Women who were forced to cook for a warring faction were at significantly higher risk.

Another inevitable consequence of armed conflicts is the ensuing economic and social disruption which can force large numbers of people into prostitution, an observation that applies equally to the situation of refugees, whether they are fleeing armed conflicts or natural disasters such as floods, earthquakes or powerful storms.

Refugees fleeing conflicts and other threatening conditions are often at risk of rape in their new setting. Data from the Office of the United Nations High Commissioner for Refugees, for instance, indicated that among the boat people who fled Vietnam in the late 1970s and early 1980s, 39% of the women were abducted or raped by pirates while at sea, a figure that is likely to be an underestimate.

In many refugee camps as well, including those in Kenya and the United Republic of Tanzania, rape has been found to be a major problem.

=== By women ===
According to Lara Stemple, Andrew Flores, and Ilan H Meyer, when, in the United States, counting cases where the victim is made to penetrate the perpetrator against their will, women and men suffer from non-consensual sex at similar rates. 68.6% of men report female perpetrators. This does not show up in the Centers for Disease Control's rape statistics, because they define rape as being penetrated against one's own will. Men are more likely to be made to penetrate someone else against their will than they are to be penetrated against their will. 79.2% of men who are made to penetrate someone else against their will report female perpetrators.

== Customary forms of sexual violence ==
=== Child marriage ===
Marriage is often used to legitimize a range of forms of sexual violence against women. The custom of marrying off young children, particularly girls, is found in many parts of the world. This practice is legal in many countries and is a form of sexual violence, since the children involved are unable to give or withhold their consent. The majority of them know little or nothing about sex before they are married. They therefore frequently fear it and their first sexual encounters are often forced.

Early marriage is most common in Africa and South Asia, though it also occurs in the Middle East and parts of Latin America and Eastern Europe. In Ethiopia and parts of West Africa, for instance, marriage at the age of 7 or 8 years is not uncommon. In Nigeria, the mean age at first marriage is 17 years, but in the Kebbi State of northern Nigeria, the average age at first marriage is just over 11 years. High rates of child marriage have also been reported in the Democratic Republic of the Congo, Mali, Niger and Uganda.

In South Asia, child marriage is especially common in rural areas, but exists also in urban areas. In Nepal, the average age at first marriage is 19 years. Seven per cent of girls, though, are married before the age of 10 years, and 40% by the age of 15 years. In India, the median age at first marriage for women is 16.4 years. A survey of 5000 women in the Indian state of Rajasthan found that 56% of the women had married before the age of 15 years, and of these, 17% were married before they were 10 years old. Another survey, conducted in the state of Madhya Pradesh, found that 14% of girls were married between the ages of 10 and 14 years.

Elsewhere, in Latin America for instance, early age at first marriage has been reported in Cuba, Guatemala, Honduras, Mexico and Paraguay. In North America and Western Europe, less than 5% of marriages involve girls younger than 19 years of age (for example, 1% in Canada, Switzerland and the United Kingdom, 2% in Belgium and Germany, 3% in Spain, and 4% in the United States.

=== Other customs leading to violence ===
There are no reliable global estimates for the prevalence of child maltreatment. Data for many countries, especially low- and middle-income countries, are lacking. Current estimates vary widely depending on the country and the method of research used. Approximately 20% of women and 5–10% of men report being sexually abused as children, while 25–50% of all children report being physically abused.

In many places, there are customs other than child marriage that result in sexual violence towards women. In Zimbabwe, for instance, there is the custom of ngozi, whereby a girl can be given to a family as compensation for a death of a man caused by a member of the girl's family. On reaching puberty the girl is expected to have sexual intercourse with the brother or father of the deceased person, so as to produce a son to replace the one who died. Another custom is chimutsa mapfiwa, according to which, when a married woman dies, her sister is obliged to replace her in the matrimonial home. Widow inheritance is or was practised by many cultures; when a man died, his widow was forced to marry one of his brothers.

== By country ==
Annual recorded statistics of victims of sexual violence per 100,000 population is shown below for available countries for the last available year as reported by law enforcement. Definition of sexual violence and types of perpetrators might differ between countries.

Country	Sex of victim	Type of perpetrator				Year
Country	Sex of victim	Domestic	Non-domestic Known to victim	Unknown to victim	Not known	Year
Albania	Female	0.1	-	-	-	2018
Albania	Male	0.1	0.8	0.1	6.2	2018
Antigua and Barbuda	Female	-	-	-	-	2018
Antigua and Barbuda	Male	4.6	22.6	-	69.2	2022
Australia	Female	78.8	-	-	-	2022
Australia	Male	9.7	-	-	-	2022
Austria	Female	18.6	47.3	24.6	2.0	2022
Austria	Male	3.8	5.9	3.8	0.2	2022
Azerbaijan	Female	0.0	-	-	0.7	2020
Azerbaijan	Male	-	-	-	0.5	2020
Bahamas	Female	13.1	22.9	11.2	0.0	2022
Bahamas	Male	2.6	0.5	0.0	0.0	2022
Belize	Female	19.8	1.0	51.6	0.0	2022
Belize	Male	0.5	0.0	1.0	0.0	2022
Bolivia	Female	58.1	6.5	55.6	45.8	2018
Bolivia	Male	2.3	0.1	2.5	2.0	2022
Canada	Female	69.1	78.4	26.9	0.2	2022
Canada	Male	7.4	12.4	4.6	0.0	2022
Colombia	Female	3.1	0.8	0.0	20.4	2022
Colombia	Male	0.2	0.1	0.0	2.7	2022
Croatia	Female	13.2	9.7	2.9	6.7	2022
Croatia	Male	0.9	0.7	0.2	0.7	2022
Czech Republic	Female	6.6	11.0	0.0	11.3	2022
Czech Republic	Male	0.5	3.6	0.0	1.7	2022
Denmark	Female	-	-	-	176.6	2022
Denmark	Male	-	-	-	20.8	2022
El Salvador	Female	14.9	5.0	168.7	-	2022
El Salvador	Male	1.0	0.0	18.1	-	2022
England and Wales	Female	0.6	-	-	-	2021
England and Wales	Male	0.1	-	-	-	2021
Finland	Female	11.4	-	-	121.8	2022
Finland	Male	1.4	-	-	11.9	2022
France	Female	62.7	-	-	164.4	2022
France	Male	8.5	-	-	26.1	2022
Germany	Female	19.2	43.4	37.7	9.1	2022
Germany	Male	2.5	6.8	4.6	2.2	2022
Greece	Female	-	-	0.1	-	2020
Greece	Male	-	-	-	-	2020
Guatemala	Female	0.1	-	-	-	2020
Guatemala	Male	0.0	-	-	20.1	2020
Guyana	Female	66.6	10.9	0.0	0.0	2022
Guyana	Male	8.1	3.8	0.0	0.0	2022
Honduras	Female	11.8	4.2	0.0	-	2022
Honduras	Male	1.0	0.4	0.0	4.6	2022
Hungary	Female	4.0	3.1	1.3	0.0	2022
Hungary	Male	0.5	1.8	0.2	0.0	2022
Ireland	Female	11.8	13.9	3.8	1.5	2022
Ireland	Male	1.2	1.8	0.2	0.3	2022
Italy	Female	-	-	-	17.6	2022
Italy	Male	-	-	-	2.0	2022
Kyrgyzstan	Female	0.9	9.1	4.8	-	2020
Kyrgyzstan	Male	-	-	-	-	2020
Latvia	Female	6.9	8.8	2.7	1.6	2020
Latvia	Male	1.5	0.8	0.8	0.3	2020
Lithuania	Female	1.9	2.5	1.6	0.5	2022
Lithuania	Male	0.1	0.5	0.3	0.4	2022
Mexico	Female	22.8	12.4	25.2	40.3	2021
Mexico	Male	2.6	1.3	3.8	11.2	2022
Mongolia	Female	0.8	24.2	4.7	0.0	2018
Mongolia	Male	0.0	0.1	0.0	0.0	2018
Morocco	Female	0.5	0.5	1.7	6.2	2022
Morocco	Male	0.2	0.2	0.8	2.7	2022
Myanmar	Female	0.1	0.3	0.0	-	2022
Myanmar	Male	0.0	0.0	0.0	-	2018
New Zealand	Female	20.2	20.7	10.4	136.0	2018
New Zealand	Male	1.8	3.7	1.1	21.0	2018
Norway	Female	-	-	-	142.0	2022
Norway	Male	-	-	-	20.0	2022
Oman	Female	0.3	3.9	0.0	0.0	2018
Oman	Male	0.1	1.9	0.0	0.0	2018
Panama	Female	9.8	1.2	0.0	-	2020
Panama	Male	0.7	0.1	0.0	10.7	2020
Poland	Female	-	-	-	14.0	2022
Poland	Male	-	-	-	3.3	2022
Romania	Female	6.5	-	-	-	2022
Romania	Male	0.5	-	-	-	2022
Saint Kitts and Nevis	Female	8.1	40.6	40.6	129.8	2022
Saint Kitts and Nevis	Male	4.3	0.0	0.0	0.0	2022
Slovakia	Female	0.0	-	17.9	-	2022
Slovakia	Male	0.5	0.4	1.6	0.4	2022
Slovenia	Female	6.4	8.1	6.3	0.0	2022
Slovenia	Male	0.8	1.2	0.3	0.0	2022
Spain	Female	8.1	6.6	33.3	9.8	2022
Spain	Male	0.8	1.0	5.1	1.4	2022
Sweden	Female	43.4	65.5	87.8	164.2	2022
Sweden	Male	2.0	5.1	7.9	23.7	2022
Switzerland	Female	18.4	18.6	9.8	9.6	2022
Switzerland	Male	2.0	3.3	1.7	1.5	2022
Venezuela	Female	0.5	0.0	2.5	1.4	2018
Venezuela	Male	0.1	0.0	0.3	0.2	2018

== See also ==
- Fear of crime
- Rape statistics
- Crime statistics
- Sexual violence in the Democratic Republic of the Congo
- Sexual violence in Papua New Guinea
- Sexual violence in South Africa
