= Dark figure of crime =

Term used by criminologists and sociologists

The dark figure of crime, hidden figure of crime, or latent criminality is the amount of unreported, undetected, or undiscovered crime. It is a central concept of victimology, as it highlights the limitations of solely relying upon official crime statistics. Crime may go unreported for various reasons, such as a victim being unaware that a crime occurred, personal dynamics with the perpetrator, perceived social stigma, distrust of the police, or fear of retaliation. The concept was coined by Belgian sociologist and criminologist Adolphe Quetelet in the 19th century.

== Methodology ==
The gap between reported and unreported crimes calls the accuracy and completeness of crime data, calling the reliability of official crime statistics into question. The analysis of multiple sources of crime data is thus necessary to adjust for this discrepancy.

All measures of crime have a dark figure to some degree. Comparisons between official statistics, such as the Uniform Crime Reports and the National Incident-Based Reporting System, and victim studies, such as the National Crime Victimization Survey (NCVS), attempt to provide an insight into the amount of unreported crime.

Self-report studies are also used in comparison with official statistics and organized datasets to assess the dark of crime.

== By type ==
The gap in official statistics is largest for certain types of crime, particularly non-violent offenses, domestic abuse, white-collar crime, and sexual abuse.

White-collar crime and corporate crime often remain undetected due to several factors, including the desire to avoid law enforcement interference that could negatively impact their reputation, contracts, and employee productivity, as well as fear of potential penalties such as fines or increased scrutiny that may arise from police investigations. Further factors such as the limited classifications of white collar crime, manipulation of official records, resource limitations for investigators, and a historical focus on traditional crimes also hamper the efficacy of crime reporting programs such as the UCR from providing accurate statistics on white-collar crime.

Sexual violence is another crime type that has been historically underreported. Estimates of sexual violence from victim surveys differ from sexual violence crime statistics reported by law enforcement. It is estimated that only 23 out of 1,000 sexual violence and rape cases are reported to law enforcement, with only 1 in 5 victims disclosing their assault to law enforcement directly. Common reasons victims cite for not reporting include considering the incident a personal matter, fear of reprisal, or a belief that the police may be biased or ineffective. In cases of attempted rape, victims may also choose not to report in order to protect the offender. The relationship between the victim and the offender can also significantly impact reporting. Crimes committed by current or former intimate partners are especially likely to go unreported, as are incidents involving friends or acquaintances.

== Impacts ==
The dark figure of crime affects the public perception of crime when many crimes are not reported and counted in official statistics. The under-reporting of certain categories of crimes (such as domestic violence and child abuse) leads to misperceptions about who commits crimes and where; street crimes are more heavily reported in official statistics leading to artificially high rates of crime among young working-class males. Additionally, it can alter decision making by policymakers when drafting laws, funding programs, and issuing support for disadvantaged groups.

== See also ==
- Fear of crime
- There are unknown unknowns
