= International Crime Victims Survey =

The International Crime Victims Survey (ICVS) is a large scale international survey project about crime and victimization. The project was set up to fill the gap in adequate recording of offenses by the police for purposes of comparing crime rates in different nations and to provide a crime index independent of police statistics as an alternative standardized measure.

There have been 6 rounds of surveys to date (1989–1992-1996–2000–2004/05–2010). Surveys have been done on 80 countries and provides information about criminal victimization in 41 countries and 66 main(capital) cities from all continents.

== European Survey on Crime and Safety ==
The European Survey on Crime and Safety (EU ICS) is an EU funded project, and builds on the ICVS methodology and the results are fully compatible with the ICVS. The EU ICS results have been published separately and in combination with the ICVS in other countries.

== See also ==
- Criminology
- Crime statistics
- List of countries by murder rate
