= National Crime Victimization Survey =

National survey administered by the United States Census Bureau

The National Crime Victimization Survey (NCVS), administered by the US Census Bureau under the Department of Commerce, is a survey of a nationally representative sample of about 240,000 persons aged 12 or older in about 150,000 households twice a year in the United States. It obtains data on the frequency of crime victimization, as well as characteristics and consequences of victimization. The survey focuses on gathering information on the following crimes: assault, burglary, larceny, motor vehicle theft, rape, and robbery. The survey results are used for the purposes of building a crime index. It has been used in comparison with the Uniform Crime Reports and the National Incident-Based Reporting System to assess the dark figure of crime. The NCVS survey is comparable to the British Crime Survey conducted in the United Kingdom.

The NCVS began in 1972 and was developed from work done by the National Opinion Research Center and the President's Commission on Law Enforcement and Administration of Justice. A key finding of the survey was the realization that many crimes were not reported to the police.

== Methodology ==
NCVS surveys households randomly selected from a stratified multistage cluster sample, with the interviews administered by the United States Census Bureau. This methodology has some disadvantages for surveying domestic violence crimes, since the entire selected household (above age 12) is interviewed instead of just one member selected. The selected household remains in the survey sample for three years, with interviews conducted every six months.

NCVS also includes supplemental questions, which allow periodic questions to be asked regarding such topics as school violence or attitudes toward crime or police.

In response to criticism of the survey design, the NCVS was redesigned in the late 1980s. The survey redesign also incorporated improved survey methodology and asks more direct questions. The redesign went through testing and evaluation before being fully implemented in the 1992–1993 survey.

== See also ==
- Uniform Crime Reports
- Defensive gun use
- List of household surveys in the United States
