= Low copy number =

DNA profiling technique

Low Copy Number (LCN) is a DNA profiling technique developed by the UK Forensic Science Service (FSS) which has been in use since 1999.

In the United Kingdom use of the technique was suspended between 21 December 2007 and 14 January 2008 while the Crown Prosecution Service conducted a review into its use – this suspension has now been lifted.

LCN is an extension of Second Generation Multiplex Plus (SGM Plus) profiling technique. It is a more sensitive technique because it involves a greater amount of copying via polymerase chain reaction (PCR) from a smaller amount of starting material, meaning that a profile can be obtained from only a few cells, which may be as small as a millionth the size of a grain of salt, and amount to just a few cells of skin or sweat left from a fingerprint.

== Advantages ==
LCN evidence has allowed convictions to be made in several cold cases. For example, Mark Henson was convicted of rape in 2005, 10 years after the crime was committed, from re-analysis of a microscope slide. In 1981, evidence was deliberately kept after the rape and murder of 14-year-old Marion Crofts in Aldershot. In 1999, a DNA profile was obtained from this using LCN. This was continually checked against the UK National DNA Database for the next two years, until a match was eventually found for Tony Jasinskyj after he was arrested for another crime. He was eventually given a life sentence in 2002.

In 2010 the technique was only used in a few countries: the UK, the Netherlands, Poland and New Zealand.

== Criticism ==
It has been used in more than 21,000 serious crime cases in the UK and internationally, particularly in "cold" cases. A FSS spokesman said: "LCN DNA analysis is only carried out by the most-experienced DNA scientists, who have undergone special additional training and testing in this area of casework." However, the technique came under attack from the Judge during the trial of Sean Hoey – who was eventually cleared of involvement in the Omagh Bombing. One of the criticisms the judge leveled at LCN was that although the FSS had internally validated and published scientific papers on the technique, there was an alleged lack of external validation by the wider scientific community. Following the Judge's ruling, the use of the technique was suspended in the UK, pending a review by the Crown Prosecution Service. This review was completed and the suspension lifted on the January 14, 2008 with the CPS stating that it had not seen anything to suggest that any current problems exist with LCN.

== See also ==
- Batman rapist – unidentified British serial rapist whose DNA is known thanks to the low copy number technique
