= Police Forensic Science Laboratory Dundee =

The Police Forensic Science Laboratory Dundee (PFSLD) was established in April 1989. There are four main departments: Biology, Chemistry, the national DNA Database and Quality/Administration.

PFSLD is funded by and serves Central Scotland Police, Fife Constabulary and Tayside Police and along with the 3 other police laboratories in Scotland, is independent from the Forensic Science Service of England and Wales. The PFSLD houses the DNA database for the whole of Scotland, and exports copies to the UK National DNA Database.

== See also ==
- DNA
- Forensic science
- Law enforcement in Scotland
