= Murder of Marion Crofts =

1981 child murder in Aldershot, England

Marion Crofts
- Marion Crofts, c. 1981
- Born: 12 December 1966
- Died: 6 June 1981 (aged 14); Laffans Road, Aldershot, England; 51.268586°N 0.791111°W (approximate)
- Cause of death: Blunt force trauma to face and skull; Strangulation
- Education: Court Moor School, Fleet
- Occupation: Student
- Known for: Victim of child murder

The murder of Marion Crofts is a British child murder case which occurred on 6 June 1981, in which a 14-year-old girl was abducted, raped, then bludgeoned and strangled to death while cycling from her home in Fleet, Hampshire to the town of Farnborough. Her body was discovered concealed in undergrowth alongside a canal towpath within hours of her murder.

Despite an intense contemporary investigation, her murder remained unsolved for over twenty years until advances in DNA analysis enabled investigators to identify her murderer as a 44-year-old security guard and former soldier named Tony Jasinskyj, who had been stationed at Aldershot Garrison—less than two miles (3.2 km) from the site of Crofts' murder—at the time of her death.

Jasinskyj was brought to trial for Crofts' rape and murder at Winchester Crown Court in April 2002; he was convicted of all charges and jailed for life the following month.

== Early life ==
Marion Crofts was the youngest of three children born to Trevor and Anne (née Evans) Crofts. She had two older sisters, Shirley and Sally. Her family was reasonably wealthy, and lived in a middle-class neighbourhood in Fleet, Hampshire.

Crofts has been described as a shy, intelligent, studious and academically achieving girl, yet humorous and lively around her family and friends. She attended Court Moor School, and her interests included sports—in particular netball—and music. She also played the clarinet in her school band, and held aspirations to become a teacher.

== 6 June 1981 ==
On the morning of Saturday 6 June 1981, Crofts left her home to cycle approximately 5 miles (8.0 km) to a youth orchestra rehearsal at The Wavell School in nearby Farnborough. Typically, Crofts' father drove his daughter to her weekly band practice, although on this particular day, he had plans to play in a local cricket match. As such, with her family's knowledge and approval, Crofts opted to ride to band practice on her blue Raleigh bicycle. She left the family home at approximately 9:10 a.m., wearing a fawn anorak, blue jeans and brown plimsolls and with her clarinet in a leather case upon the bicycle's rear rack. She also had a school sponsorship form upon her person. As Saturday orchestra rehearsals at The Wavell School typically finished by mid-afternoon, Crofts' family expected her to return home by approximately 3:30 p.m.

Map of Hampshire, depicting the locations of Crofts' home and The Wavell School. The flashpoint depicts the approximate location of her murder.

To reach The Wavell School via bicycle, Crofts travelled from her Basingbourne Close home to Velmead Road, then along the A323 before cycling along Laffans Road adjacent to the Basingstoke Canal. She is believed to have encountered her murderer as she passed a dense section of undergrowth at this location shortly after 9:30 a.m.

=== Murder ===
Crofts was attacked by her assailant as she cycled along Laffans Road sometime between 9:30 and 10 a.m. The precise chain of events which unfolded is unknown; however her assailant evidently either waylaid her, pushed her off her bike, or grabbed her as she cycled along the road. Crofts was then dragged or otherwise forced into the woodland and undergrowth out of the sight of passing motorists. Her assailant then raped her—either before, during or after inflicting extensive blunt force trauma to her face and skull, causing intracranial hemorrhaging—before strangling her to death and concealing her body in a nearby copse.

When Crofts had failed to return home by 4 p.m., her mother and sister (the only other family members present in the household at the time) became concerned—particularly after telephoning her school and learning she had failed to attend the orchestra rehearsal. Similar telephone inquiries at the homes of her close friends also revealed none of them had seen her that day. In response, her mother and 17-year-old sister, Shirley, cycled along the route Crofts would have taken from her home to the school, whereupon one of the two found the school sponsorship form she had been carrying discarded along the roadside upon a remote section of Laffans Road. Upon searching the area further, they discovered one of Crofts' socks and one of her plimsolls. Her mother and sister immediately cycled to the nearby Army Golf Club and telephoned the police.

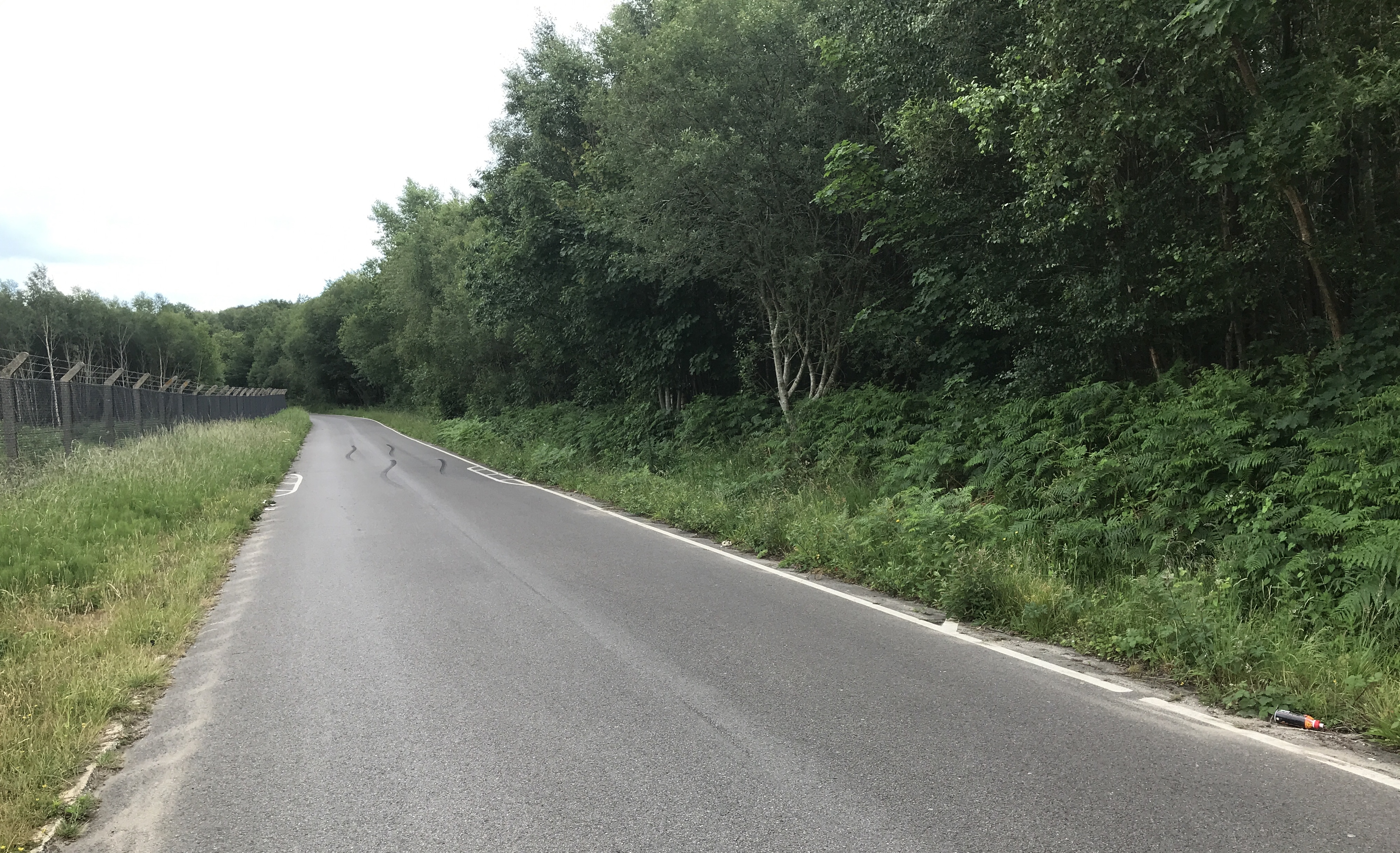
Laffans Road, seen here in 2020. Crofts encountered her murderer as she cycled along this stretch of road.

== Body discovery ==
Shortly after Anne Crofts' telephone call, police officers arrived at Laffans Road with a search and rescue dog and at 5:20 p.m., a police dog-handler discovered Crofts' extensively bludgeoned body concealed beneath vegetation and branches in a dense patch of undergrowth within the copse, adjacent to Basingstoke Canal. The location was close to the Army Golf Club from where Anne Crofts had earlier reported her daughter's disappearance and approximately 30 feet (9.1 m) from where she and Shirley had discovered her sock and plimsoll. A two-and-a-half-inch depression was discovered in the compacted soil beneath the teenager's head where her murderer had evidently stamped upon her skull.

The day after the discovery of Crofts' body, a canoeist discovered a clarinet case floating upon the edge of the Basingstoke Canal. Trevor and Anne Crofts identified the case as belonging to their daughter. Shortly thereafter, an underwater search unit located her bicycle at the bottom of the canal, close to where her murderer had left her body.

=== Autopsy ===
Crofts' autopsy revealed the teenager had been violently raped in addition to receiving extensive bludgeoning to her face and skull prior to her death by strangulation. No defence wounds were visible upon her body, and marks upon and around her mouth indicated that at one point in her abduction, her murderer had placed his hand firmly across her mouth, most likely from behind, thus indicating she may have been dragged off her bike as she cycled along Laffans Road. Her murderer had extensively beaten her with both his fists and his feet at a location close to where her body was discovered, likely rendering her unconscious. The coroner also noted ample traces of the murderer's secretions both in and upon her body as well as upon her jeans and one of her socks.

Marion Crofts' funeral service was conducted in Aldershot on the morning of 17 June 1981. Her body was cremated following the service.

== Initial investigation ==
Hampshire Police immediately launched an intense manhunt to apprehend Crofts' murderer, with Detective Sergeant John Carruthers assigning numerous officers full-time to the case. Upon launching the manhunt, a police spokesman informed the press: "The murder of Marion Crofts leads anyone in the police service to the conclusion that it is highly probable that the killer is responsible for other crimes. We consider [the perpetrator] to be someone who represents a very serious threat to the public."

Investigators conducted extensive door-to-door inquiries in addition to questioning every soldier stationed at the nearby army barracks. In the weeks following the murder, over 24,000 people were questioned—1,500 of them British Army personnel stationed at Aldershot—and numerous persons of interest interviewed or otherwise investigated. Many members of the public, including each member of the armed forces, were asked to fill in a questionnaire accounting for their movements on 6 June before their alibis were investigated. This line of inquiry failed to produce any solid leads.

Contemporary police reconstruction of Crofts' movements prior to her murder. The stand-in is depicted riding Crofts' bicycle and wearing the clothes Crofts wore as her abductor saw her.

=== Televised reconstruction ===
One week after the discovery of Crofts' body, a televised reconstruction of her movements from her home to the site of her murder was broadcast nationwide in an effort to produce further eyewitnesses; this reconstruction resulted in several witnesses who had observed suspicious individuals and/or vehicles upon or near Laffans Road on the morning of Crofts' murder contacting the police. One eyewitness had observed a young, dark-haired man running along Laffans Road towards Eelmoor Bridge sometime between 9:30 and 10:30 a.m. on the morning of 6 June; another witness stated she had seen either a brown or maroon Mark III Ford Cortina parked on Laffans Road both on the morning of 6 June and on several consecutive Saturdays prior. A Reliant Robin was also seen driving along Laffans Road on several occasions between 9:30 and 11 a.m. (Note: The owner of the Mark III Ford Cortina and the individual seen running in the direction of Eelmoor Bridge were never traced.)

Although this televised reconstruction saw ninety-seven new witness statements collected and over 100 individuals in the vicinity of the murder on 6 June—some of whom had been referenced in the reconstruction—coming forward to be eliminated from police inquiries, the perpetrator remained at large.

== Cold case ==
Despite an extensive contemporary police investigation, which saw numerous persons of interest eliminated as suspects, the murder remained unsolved and, with investigators having exhausted all leads of inquiry by early 1983, the investigation largely became cold, although subject to periodic review. Nonetheless, all physical and forensic evidence from the crime scene was retained and carefully preserved in the hope that future forensic testing techniques would advance sufficiently to identify and apprehend the perpetrator of the crime. This included the DNA samples obtained from Crofts' body and clothing, which were carefully sealed to avoid any form of cross contamination. (Note: The DNA retrieved from Crofts' body and clothing was preserved upon microscope slides.)

== Renewed investigation ==
By September 1999, the technique of forensic analysis had advanced sufficiently to enable law enforcement to obtain a complete DNA profile of Crofts' murderer from the physical evidence investigators had retained and preserved upon microscope slides. This profile was obtained using the new low copy number (LCN) testing technique, and Hampshire Police launched Operation Vortex in a renewed effort to locate Crofts' murderer. Fresh public appeals to identify the perpetrator were launched, and over 3,300 individuals originally questioned in 1981 and 1982 were revisited, re-questioned and—in instances where the individual was unable to prove he had not been in Hampshire on the date of the murder—DNA swabs taken for comparison with the sample from the perpetrator. (Note: The renewed police effort to identify Crofts' murderer via comparing suspects' DNA samples to the DNA profile obtained from the crime scene saw approximately 580 mouth swabs taken from individuals then living as far afield as Australia.) The case was also featured on BBC One's Crimewatch UK in February 2000, and a psychological profile of the perpetrator was also released to the public. This profile described the perpetrator as being prone to violence in his everyday life and incapable of understanding the true concept of remorse. The profile also indicated a high likelihood the perpetrator would have committed other violent offences as serious as Crofts' murderer before and after the crime.

=== Suspect identification ===
To the disappointment of both Crofts' family and investigators, the DNA profile of her murderer initially failed to match any individuals either within the UK National DNA Database or independently swabbed as a result of Operation Vortex; however, the DNA profile was intermittently checked against the UK National DNA Database for a potential match over the following two years until, in August 2001, a match was made against a former soldier named Tony Jasinskyj (b. 2 April 1957), a native of Leicester who had been stationed at Aldershot in 1981, had served with the Parachute Regiment in Northern Ireland, and had been discharged from the British Army one year later.

Jasinskyj was a former lance corporal in the Army Catering Corps; he had been among the 1,500 British Army personnel stationed at Aldershot who had been questioned in the weeks following Crofts' murder and had claimed to have been working within the mess hall at Browning Barracks upon the army base at the time of the crime, although his alibi had never been verified. He had no criminal record and at the time of the murder, had been married for five years and was living in army married quarters approximately a mile and a half away from the murder scene with his pregnant wife, Lynn (née Gowans), and infant daughter. He had been discharged from the army in 1982 and in the intervening years had worked as a lorry driver and insurance salesman before relocating to the village of Desford in Leicestershire with his second wife, Michelle (née Jordan), whom he had married four years after his first wife had divorced him in 1984 due to repeated instances of his domestic violence, and with whom he fathered six further children.

By the early 2000s, Jasinskyj was employed as a security guard. As had been the case with his first marriage, his marriage to his second wife had been mired by multiple instances of domestic violence. In early 2001, his second wife filed a complaint against Jasinskyj in relation to a particularly severe physical assault in which he had fractured several of her ribs. Upon his arrest, police had obtained a routine DNA sample which was subsequently entered into the UK National DNA Database as a matter of routine procedure. Shortly after investigators discovered the forensic match, Hampshire Police were notified of developments, and a warrant was issued for Jasinskyj's arrest. He was arrested by Hampshire Police for Crofts' rape and murder as he appeared at Hinckley Magistrates Court in Leicestershire to face charges of assaulting his second wife and driven to Hampshire to face formal questioning in relation to Crofts' murder.

=== Formal murder charge ===
Formal questioning of Jasinskyj took place at Aldershot police station. He was interrogated by detectives Douglas Utting and Adrian Leese. Jasinskyj denied any culpability in the crime; he claimed to be unable to recall his movements on the date of Crofts' murder and expressed surprise and bewilderment at being accused of "something this vile". However, when confronted with the forensic evidence irrefutably linking him to the crime, Jasinskyj replied: "That's impossible ... unless [the DNA] was actually planted there." In response, one of the detectives replied: "Why would [anyone] do that? DNA wasn't known about then, was it? No-one was thinking about that back then."

Jasinskyj continued to deny any culpability in the crime and insisted the evidence had either been planted at the scene, or speculated his semen may have transferred to her clothing via a method unbeknownst to him. In response to this conjecture, one of the detectives stated: "She was raped; she was fourteen. No prior sexual history. Fourteen! A child! She's got semen on her—your semen!" He was formally charged with Crofts' murder on 6 September 2001 and remanded in custody at HM Prison Winchester, to await trial.

=== Additional circumstantial evidence ===
Additional police inquiries also amassed circumstantial evidence further attesting to Jasinskyj's guilt; this included the fact his contemporary claim to investigators to have been working on the morning of the murder was untrue, and his first wife's testimony that she had been pregnant with her second child at the time of Crofts' death and that due to the fact she had suffered a miscarriage the year prior, had thus refused to engage in sex with Jasinskyj while carrying their second child for fear of compromising her pregnancy—leading her to speculate her refusal to engage in sex with him may have led him to forcefully seek encounters elsewhere.

Jasinskyj's first wife would also recall for investigators that shortly prior to Crofts' murder, he had severely beaten her and that, in the days following her death, she had observed scratches on his arms as he sat on their living room floor playing with their toddler daughter. As she was well aware her husband was unafraid to beat her and potentially other women but would cower away from conflicts with other males, she had both thought and hoped the wounds had been inflicted as he had been "given the smacking I dreamed of giving him every time he hurt me" by another male.

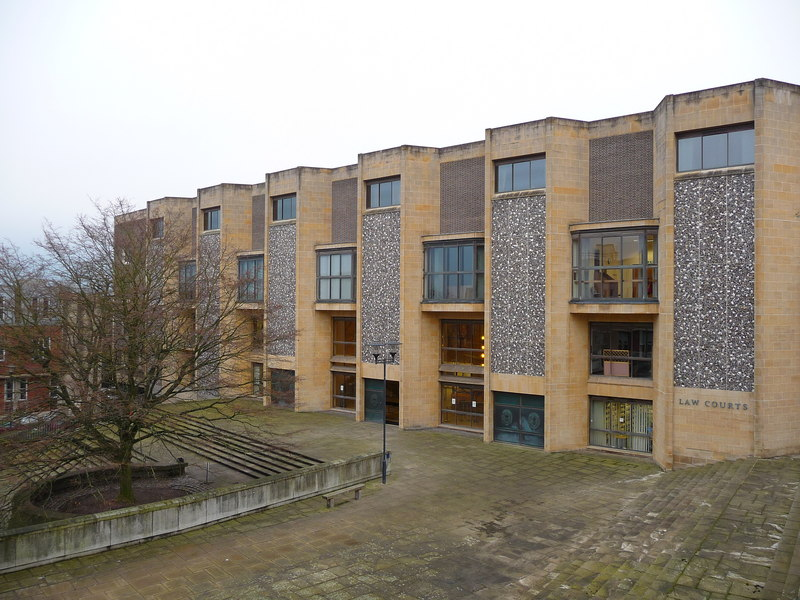
Winchester Crown Court. Jasinskyj was brought to trial at this location in April 2002.

== Trial ==
The trial of Tony Jasinskyj for the murder of Marion Crofts began at Winchester Crown Court on 8 April 2002. He was tried before Judge Michael Brodrick and a jury. Jasinskyj's counsel entered a plea of not guilty on behalf of their client.

In the opening days of the trial, prosecutors Michael Bowes and James Leonard outlined the circumstances surrounding Crofts' abduction and murder, the subsequent search along Laffans Road by her mother and sister, the discovery of her body, the details within the subsequent autopsy report of how the injuries she had sustained had likely rendered her unconscious before her rapist and murderer had strangled her to death before making hasty efforts to conceal her body, and the DNA evidence retrieved upon and within her body left by the perpetrator.

Forensic experts also testified as to the locations of the DNA evidence retrieved from three separate areas of Crofts' body and clothing, the pattern of which portrayed a clear scenario as to how Crofts' lower body had been in a state of partial or complete undress as her murderer had either ejaculated within her body, then wiped and/or daubed his penis upon her clothing, or had ejaculated upon her clothing before or after physically raping the child. In reference to the forensic efforts to preserve all the physical evidence introduced at trial—including the perpetrator's bodily secretions—and avoid any form of contamination, the prosecution also produced charts chronologically documenting the whereabouts of each piece of evidence from the date of the crime to the present, who had come into contact with the evidence at each stage, and what appropriate forensic methods had been taken when handling the evidence. Each stage of each chart was supported with corroborating documentary evidence.

The jury were also told by a scientific expert that the DNA match to Jasinskyj was one in a billion, that the technology used to link his secretions to those at the crime scene did not exist in 1981, and that the forensic breakthrough which had enabled investigators to link his bodily secretions to the crime sourced from a mouth swab he had provided the previous year, having been arrested in Leicester on an "unconnected matter".

The defence presented their case before the jury on 3 May. The sole witness to testify on their behalf was Jasinskyj himself. He denied any culpability in the crime and continued to contend that the forensic match to his DNA was due to either the evidence having been planted or via innocuous transferral. When cross-examined about his earlier claim to investigators that the semen stains upon Crofts' body being a forensic match to his own DNA was "impossible", Jasinskyj was asked: "Well ... where did your DNA [upon Crofts' body] come from?" To this, Jasinskyj countered by asking the prosecutor: "Well, let's have the alternative, then. What's your explanation?" to which he was told: "The explanation is that you did it."

After six hours, the defence rested their case.

=== Conviction ===
Jasinskyj's trial lasted four weeks, with both counsels delivering their closing arguments before the jury on 9 May before the jurors retired to begin their deliberations. They would deliberate for three hours over the course of two days before finding Jasinskyj guilty of both charges. He was sentenced to life imprisonment for Crofts' murder and ten years' imprisonment for her rape, to run concurrently. Upon hearing the jury's verdict, Jasinskyj simply shrugged his shoulders and shook his head, muttering "I can't believe it" as several individuals within the public gallery cheered and/or wept.

"Tony Jasinskyj, you have been convicted of the cruel and callous murder of Marion Crofts, a fourteen-year-old girl cycling on her way to band practice. The anguish that your action must have caused her parents, her family and friends ... probably cannot be imagined by anyone who hasn't had to suffer that loss for nigh on twenty-one years and hasn't had to comprehend those final brutal moments of her life."

— Judge Michael Brodrick, passing sentence upon Tony Jasinskyj. 10 May 2002.

Upon passing sentence, Judge Brodrick remarked that Jasinskyj had committed a "cruel and callous murder" and had subjected Crofts' family to twenty-one years of suffering as they thought of "the final, dreadful, brutal moments of her life", adding: "The anguish that your action must have caused her parents, her family and friends, probably cannot be imagined."

== Aftermath ==
With the agreement of both of Jasinskyj's former wives, the outstanding charges against him pertaining to the physical assaults against both women were ordered to lie on file following his murder conviction.

In 2014, Jasinskyj appealed his conviction, contending before Lady Justice Macur QC, Lord Justice Phillips and Judge Neil Ford QC at the Court of Appeal that the DNA evidence introduced as irrefutable evidence of his guilt at trial was unsafe due to an irregularity in the DNA profile obtained and which experts had testified sourced from the DNA of the victim which had been mixed with the profile prosecutors had contended sourced from him. As such, Jasinskyj contended the DNA was not his and that the actual perpetrator had suffered from a chromosome abnormality.

Upon reviewing the evidence, Appeal Judge Lord Justice Phillips ruled the original verdict was "entirely safe" and dismissed Jasinskyj's claim as "fanciful", stating that his "fixation on an anomaly" did not in any way explain the otherwise precise DNA match between himself and the perpetrator of the crime.

Jasinskyj became eligible for parole in 2022. He has unsuccessfully applied for release, and remains incarcerated within HM Prison Littlehey in Huntingdon, Cambridgeshire.

== See also ==
- Cold case
- DNA analysis – Medical test to identify changes in DNA or chromosomes
- Forensic science
- List of kidnappings
- List of solved missing person cases: 1950–1999
- Low copy number – DNA profiling technique

== Media ==
=== Bibliography ===
- Ellis, Chris; Owens, Andy (2008). Killer Catchers - Fourteen True Stories of How Britain's Wickedest Murderers Were Brought to Justice. London: John Blake Publishing. ISBN 978-1-784-18559-6.
- Marriner, Brian (1994). "Murderer of Childhood". True Crime Detective Monthly (August 1994 ed.). Magazine Design & Publishing Ltd. pp. 10–14. ISSN 0261-264X.

=== Television ===
- The BBC have commissioned a documentary focusing on the murder of Marion Crofts as part of the documentary series Watching the Detectives. This 60-minute documentary, titled The Murder of Marion Crofts, was first broadcast in August 2003. This documentary focuses on the forensic developments leading to the eventual apprehension and conviction of Tony Jasinskyj for Crofts' murder.

== Cited works and further reading ==
- Appleyard, Nicholas (2009). Life Means Life: Jailed Forever: True Stories of Britain's Most Evil Killers. London: John Blake Publishing. ISBN 978-1-476-60808-2.
- Barker, Francis (1984). Confronting the Crisis War, Politics and Culture in the Eighties: the Proceedings of the Essex Sociology of Literature Conference. University of Essex. ISBN 978-0-901-72622-3.
- Basannavar, Nick (2021). Sexual Violence Against Children in Britain Since 1965: Trailing Abuse. Macmillan Publishers Ltd. ISBN 978-3-030-83148-6.
- Cawthorne, Nigel (2007). The Mammoth Book of Killers at Large. London: Constable & Robinson Ltd. ISBN 978-1-845-29631-5.
- Church, Robert (1996). Well Done, Boys: the Life and Crimes of Robert Black. Constable. ISBN 978-0-094-74150-8.
- Dunning, John (1987). Mindless Murders. London: Mulberry Editions. ISBN 978-1-873-12333-1.
- Evans, Colin (1996). The Casebook of Forensic Detection: How Science Solved 100 of the World's Most Baffling Crimes. New York City: John Wiley & Sons Inc. ISBN 0-471-07650-3.
- Greig, Charlotte (2016). Cold Cases: Astonishing investigations from The Green River Killer to JonBenet Ramsay. London: Arcturus Publishing. ISBN 978-1-785-99858-4.
- Holmes, Ronald M.; Holmes, Stephen T. (2002). Profiling Violent Crimes: An Investigative Tool. Los Angeles: Sage Publications. ISBN 978-0-761-92594-1.
- Innes, Brian (2000). Bodies of Evidence. London: Amber Books Ltd. ISBN 978-1-856-05623-6.
- Jermyn, Deborah (2006). Crime Watching: Investigating Real Crime TV. London: I. B. Tauris. ISBN 978-0-857-71172-4.
- Lawless, Christopher (2022). Forensic Science: A Sociological Introduction. New York: Taylor & Francis Group. ISBN 978-1-000-54343-8.
- McRery, Nigel (2013). Silent Witnesses: A History of Forensic Science. London: Random House Books. ISBN 978-1-847-94683-6.
- Nash, Jay Robert (1983). Open Files: A Narrative Encyclopedia of the World's Greatest Unsolved Crimes. London: The Rowman & Littlefield Publishing Group, Inc. ISBN 978-0-070-45907-6.
- Newton, Michael (2004). The Encyclopedia of Unsolved Crimes. New York: Facts on File. ISBN 978-0-816-07818-9.
- Owens, Andy; Ellis, Chris (2008). Killer Catchers: Fourteen True Stories of How Britain's Wickedest Murderers Were Brought to Justice. Sussex: John Blake Publishing. ISBN 978-1-784-18559-6.
- Pettem, Silvia (2013). Cold Case Research: Resources for Unidentified, Missing, and Cold Homicide Cases. Boca Raton: CRC Press. ISBN 978-1-466-57053-5.
- Sly, Nicola (2012). Hampshire Murders. Cheltenham: History Press. ISBN 978-0-752-48381-8.
- Watson, James D.; Berry, Andrew (2004). DNA: The Secret of Life. Warwickshire: Arrow Books Ltd. ISBN 978-0-099-45184-6.
- Wilson, Colin (1995). Written in Blood: A History of Forensic Detection. Glasgow: HarperCollins. ISBN 978-0-586-20842-7.
- Yount, Lisa (2007). Forensic Science: From Fibers to Fingerprints. New York City: Chelsea House Publishing. ISBN 978-1-604-13061-4.
