= National DNA Data Bank of Canada =

Canadian national DNA repository

The National DNA Data Bank of Canada (NDDB) is a national DNA database that was established in 2000. Managed by the RCMP, it provides matches to convicted offenders and offers a memory repository for cold cases. The database holds 734,184 DNA profiles as of July 15, 2025.

== History ==
The first DNA analysis in Canada for investigative purposes was in April of 1989. The RCMP utilized the method to aid in the investigation of a sexual assault in Ottawa, Ontario. The suspect in the case denied allegations made by the victim. Subsequent use of DNA forensic analysis confirmed the suspect to be the perpetrator.

In 1995, Bill C-104 was unanimously passed by the parliament. This enabled provincial court judges to issue police warrants for obtaining biological samples from suspects in a criminal investigation.

In 1998, the DNA Identification Act was enacted by the parliament. The Act established a new law governing the creation and administration of a national DNA database. It updated the Criminal Code to allow a judge to authorize collection of bodily substances from a person found guilty of designated offences. The same year, after the Swissair Flight 111 disaster, a special DNA typing task force led by the RCMP used the technology to help identify human remains.

In 2000, National DNA Data Bank was officially launched. The legislation enabled this time, allowed military judges to make post-conviction DNA data bank orders.

== National Missing Persons DNA Program ==
National Missing Persons DNA Program (NMPDP) is an initiative established by the Royal Canadian Mounted Police in 2018 to support missing persons and unidentified remains investigations.

== See also ==
- CODIS
