= Second Generation Multiplex Plus =

Second Generation Multiplex Plus (SGM Plus), is a DNA profiling system developed by Applied Biosystems. It is an updated version of Second Generation Multiplex. SGM Plus has been used by the UK National DNA Database since 1998.

An SGM Plus profile consists of a list of 10 number pairs, one number pair for each of 10 genetic markers, along with two letters (XX or XY) which show the result of the Amelogenin sex indicating test. Each number pair denotes the two allele values for the marker - one value is inherited from each of the subject's parents. If both alleles are the same, then only a single number, rather than a pair, is recorded.

== Genetic markers ==
The genetic markers (or loci) used by SGM Plus are all short tandem repeats (STRs). The markers used are: VWA, D8S1179, D21S11, D18S51, TH01, FGA, D3S1358, D16S539, D2S1338 and D19S433. Where a marker's designation begins with D, the digits immediately following the D indicate the chromosome that contains the marker. For example, D21S11 is on chromosome 21. SGM Plus also uses the amelogenin (amelo) sex-indicating test.

SGM Plus differs from SGM in that SGM does not use the markers D3S1358, D16S539, D2S1338 and D19S433.

SGM Plus has eight markers in common with CODIS FGA, TH01, VWA, D3S1358, D8S1179, D16S539, D18S51, and D21S11. It differs from CODIS in that it uses the additional markers D2S1338 and D19S433 and does not use the five markers CSF1PO, TPOX, D5S818, D7S820, D13S317.

Characteristics of alleles observed in the SGM Plus loci
Locus designation	Chromosome location	Common sequence motif	Allele range	Size range (bp)	Dye label
FGA	4q28	(TTTC)_{3}TTTT TTCT (CTTT)_{n} CTCC (TTCC)_{2}	12.2-51.2	215–353	NED
TH01	11p15.5	(AATG)_{n}	3-14	165–204	NED
VWA	12p12-pter	TCTA(TCTG)_{3-4}(TCTA)_{n}	10-25	157–209	5-FAM
D2S1338	2q35–37.1	(TGCC)_{n}(TTCC)_{n}	15-28	289–341	5-FAM
D3S1358	3p	TCTA (TCTG)_{1-3} (TCTA)_{n}	8-21	114–142	5-FAM
D8S1179	8	(TCTR)_{n}	7-20	128–172	JOE
D16S539	16q24-qter	(AGAT)_{n}	5-16	234–274	5-FAM
D18S51	18q21.3	(AGAA)_{n}	7-39.2	26–345	JOE
D19S433	19q12–13.1	(AAGG)(AAAG)(AAGG)(TAGG)(AAGG)_{n}	9-17.2	106–140	NED
D21S11	21q11.2–q21	(TCTA)_{n}(TCTG)_{n}[(TCTA)_{3}TA(TCTA)_{3}TCA (TCTA)_{2}TCCA TA] (TCTA)_{n}	12-41.2	187–243	JOE
Amelogenin	X: p22.1–22.3 Y: p11.2	—	—	107 113	JOE

== Dye tags ==
The primers are tagged with the following fluorescent dyes for detection under electrophoresis:

- 5-FAM
- JOE
- NED

The primers for each locus are arranged on the dyes in the following order, from low molecular weight to large molecular weight:

- 5-FAM: D3, VWA, D16, D2
- JOE: Amelo, D8, D21, D18
- NED: D19, THO, FGA

The dyes to which each primer is attached differ from those of the original SGM DNA profiling system.

== Example SGM Plus profile ==
The SGM Plus profile of subject GT36865 from a National Institute of Standards and Technology paper is given below:

SGM Plus profile of subject GT36865
Locus	Allele values
FGA	22,22
TH01	6,7
VWA	14,16
D2S1338	19,24
D3S1358	17,17
D8S1179	13,14
D16S539	9,13
D18S51	13,16
D19S433	14,15
D21S11	30,30
Amelogenin	XX

An SGM Plus profile retrieved from a DNA database would just list the allele values:

15,18; 6,9; 11,13; 22,22; 31,32.2; 14,17; 17,20; 11,12; 13,16.3; 15,16; XY

Each value is the number of tandem repeats within the allele. A non-standard repeat is designated by the number of complete repeat units and the number of base pairs of the partial repeat, separated by a decimal point.

== Probability of identity ==
The probability of identity (also known as the random match probability) is the probability that two individuals selected at random will have an identical genetic profile.

Applied Biosystems estimates the probability of identity for SGM Plus to be approximately 1 in 13 trillion for African-Americans and 1 in 3.3 trillion Caucasian Americans.

The Human Genetics Commission has reported that the random match probability is in the region of 1 in a trillion. However it stated "When the SGM Plus profiling system was first introduced, there was agreement within the scientific community that identifications with match probabilities lower than one in a billion would not be quoted in the courts of law, so as to avoid overstating the value of the DNA evidence to take into account that match probabilities are only estimates, and to make sure that the figure used was one that was meaningful to non-specialists."

The UK Crown Prosecution Service states "SGM Plus DNA profiling is very discriminating between individuals. The probability of obtaining a match between the profiles of two unrelated individuals by chance is very low, of the order of 1 in a billion. However, it has not yet been possible to carry out the required statistical testing to be able to quote this match probability, and in practice a more conservative chance match figure of 1 in 1,000 million is used."

== See also ==
- DNA profiling
- National DNA database
