= DNA database =

Type of database

A DNA database or DNA databank is a database of DNA profiles which can be used in the analysis of genetic diseases, genetic fingerprinting for criminology, or genetic genealogy. DNA databases may be public or private, the largest ones being national DNA databases.

DNA databases are often employed in forensic investigations. When a match is made from a national DNA database to link a crime scene to a person whose DNA profile is stored on a database, that link is often referred to as a cold hit. A cold hit is of particular value in linking a specific person to a crime scene, but is of less evidential value than a DNA match made without the use of a DNA database. Research shows that DNA databases of criminal offenders reduce crime rates.

Whether larger databases actually weaken match evidence has been debated. Stockmarr argued that searching a database increases the chance of coincidental matches, while Balding maintained that the evidence stays just as strong regardless of how the search was done. Recent analysis suggests both were partly right: traditional DNA profiling operates in a regime where false matches are so rare that database size barely matters, but threshold-based screening systems—which flag individuals matching some number of attributes rather than requiring an exact match—operate in a different regime where false alerts become statistically inevitable as populations grow.

== Types ==
=== Forensic ===
A forensic database is a centralized DNA database for storing DNA profiles of individuals that enables searching and comparing of DNA samples collected from a crime scene against stored profiles. The most important function of the forensic database is to produce matches between the suspected individual and crime scene bio-markers, and then provides evidence to support criminal investigations, and also leads to identify potential suspects in the criminal investigation. Majority of the National DNA databases are used for forensic purposes.

The Interpol DNA database is used in criminal investigations. Interpol maintains an automated DNA database called DNA Gateway that contains DNA profiles submitted by member countries collected from crime scenes, missing persons, and unidentified bodies. The DNA Gateway was established in 2002, and at the end of 2013, it had more than 140,000 DNA profiles from 69 member countries. Unlike other DNA databases, DNA Gateway is only used for information sharing and comparison, it does not link a DNA profile to any individual, and the physical or psychological conditions of an individual are not included in the database.

=== Genealogical ===
A national or forensic DNA database is not available for non-police purposes. DNA profiles can also be used for genealogical purposes, so that a separate genetic genealogy database needs to be created that stores DNA profiles of genealogical DNA test results. GenBank is a public genetic genealogy database that stores genome sequences submitted by many genetic genealogists. Until now, GenBank has contained large number of DNA sequences gained from more than 140,000 registered organizations, and is updated every day to ensure a uniform and comprehensive collection of sequence information. These databases are mainly obtained from individual laboratories or large-scale sequencing projects. The files stored in GenBank are divided into different groups, such as BCT (bacterial), VRL (viruses), PRI (primates)...etc. People can access GenBank from NCBI's retrieval system, and then use “BLAST” function to identify a certain sequence within the GenBank or to find the similarities between two sequences.

=== Medical ===
A medical DNA database is a DNA database of medically relevant genetic variations. It collects an individual's DNA which can reflect their medical records and lifestyle details. Through recording DNA profiles, scientists may find out the interactions between the genetic environment and occurrence of certain diseases (such as cardiovascular disease or cancer), and thus finding some new drugs or effective treatments in controlling these diseases. It is often collaborated with the National Health Service.

=== National ===
A national DNA database is a DNA database maintained by the government for storing DNA profiles of its population. Each DNA profile based on PCR uses STR (Short Tandem Repeats) analysis. They are generally used for forensic purposes, including searching and matching DNA profiles of potential criminal suspects.

In 2009 Interpol reported 54 police national DNA databases in the world and 26 more countries planned to start one. In Europe Interpol reported there were 31 national DNA databases and six more planned. The European Network of Forensic Science Institutes (ENFSI) DNA working group made 33 recommendations in 2014 for DNA database management and guidelines for auditing DNA databases. Other countries have adopted privately developed DNA databases, such as Qatar.

Typically, a tiny subset of the individual's genome is sampled from 13 or 16 regions that have high individuation.

==== United Kingdom ====
The first national DNA database in the United Kingdom was established in April 1995, called National DNA Database (NDNAD). By 2006, it contained 2.7 million DNA profiles (about 5.2% of the UK population), as well as other information from individuals and crime scenes. in 2020 it had 6.6 million profiles (5.6 million individuals excluding duplicates). The information is stored in the form of a digital code, which is based on the nomenclature of each STR. In 1995 the database originally had 6 STR markers for each profile, from 1999 10 markers, and from 2014, 16 core markers and a gender identifier. Scotland has used 21 STR loci, two Y-DNA markers and a gender identifier since 2014. In the UK, police have wide-ranging powers to take DNA samples and retain them if the subject is convicted of a recordable offence. As the large amount of DNA profiles which have been stored in NDNAD, "cold hits" may happen during the DNA matching, which means finding an unexpected match between an individual's DNA profile and an unsolved crime-scene DNA profile. This can introduce a new suspect into the investigation, thus helping to solve the old cases.

In England and Wales, anyone arrested on suspicion of a recordable offence must submit a DNA sample, the profile of which is then stored on the DNA database. Those not charged or not found guilty have their DNA data deleted within a specified period of time. In Scotland, the law similarly requires the DNA profiles of most people who are acquitted be removed from the database.

==== New Zealand ====
New Zealand was the second country to set up a DNA database. In 2019 The New Zealand DNA Profile Databank held 40,000 DNA profiles and 200,000 samples.

==== United States ====
The United States national DNA database is called Combined DNA Index System (CODIS). It is maintained at three levels: national, state and local. Each level implemented its own DNA index system. The national DNA index system (NDIS) allows DNA profiles to be exchanged and compared between participated laboratories nationally. Each state DNA index system (SDIS) allows DNA profiles to be exchanged and compared between the laboratories of various states and the local DNA index system (LDIS) allows DNA profiles collected at local sites and uploaded to SDIS and NDIS.

CODIS software integrates and connects all the DNA index systems at the three levels. CODIS is installed on each participating laboratory site and uses a standalone network known as Criminal Justice Information Systems Wide Area Network (CJIS WAN) to connect to other laboratories. In order to decrease the number of irrelevant matches at NDIS, the Convicted Offender Index requires all 13 CODIS STRs to be present for a profile upload. Forensic profiles only require 10 of the STRs to be present for an upload.

As of 2011, over 9 million records were held within CODIS. As of March 2011, 361,176 forensic profiles and 9,404,747 offender profiles have been accumulated, making it the largest DNA database in the world. As of the same date, CODIS has produced over 138,700 matches to requests, assisting in more than 133,400 investigations.

The growing public approval of DNA databases has seen the creation and expansion of many states' own DNA databases. Political measures such as California Proposition 69 (2004), which increased the scope of the DNA database, have already met with a significant increase in numbers of investigations aided. Forty-nine states in the USA, all apart from Idaho, store DNA profiles of violent offenders, and many also store profiles of suspects. A 2017 study showed that DNA databases in U.S. states "deter crime by profiled offenders, reduce crime rates, and are more cost-effective than traditional law enforcement tools".

CODIS is also used to help find missing persons and identify human remains. It is connected to the National Missing Persons DNA Database; samples provided by family members are sequenced by the University of North Texas Center for Human Identification, which also runs the National Missing and Unidentified Persons System. UNTCHI can sequence both nuclear and mitochondrial DNA.

The Department of Defense maintains a DNA database to identify the remains of service members. The Department of Defense Serum Repository maintains more than 50,000,000 records, primarily to assist in the identification of human remains. Submission of DNA samples is mandatory for US servicemen, but the database also includes information on military dependents. The National Defense Authorization Act of 2003 provided a means for federal courts or military judges to order the use of the DNA information collected to be made available for the purpose of investigation or prosecution of a felony, or any sexual offense, for which no other source of DNA information is reasonably available.

==== Australia ====
The Australian national DNA database is called the National Criminal Investigation DNA Database (NCIDD). By July 2018, it contained 837,000+ DNA profiles. The database used nine STR loci and a sex gene for analysis, and this was increased to 18 core markers in 2013. NCIDD combines all forensic data, including DNA profiles, advanced bio-metrics or cold cases.

==== Canada ====
The Canadian national DNA database is called the National DNA Data Bank (NDDB) which was established in 1998 but first used in 2000. The legislation that Parliament enacted to govern the use of this technology within the criminal justice system has been found by Canadian courts to be respectful of the constitutional and privacy rights of suspects, and of persons found guilty of designated offences.

On December 11, 1999, The Canadian Government agreed upon the DNA Identification Act. This would allow a Canadian DNA data bank to be created and amended for the criminal code. This provides a mechanism for judges to request the offender to provide blood, buccal swabs, or hair samples from DNA profiles. This legislation became official on June 29, 2000. Canadian police has been using forensic DNA evidence for over a decade. It has become one of the most powerful tools available to law enforcement agencies for the administration of justice.

NDDB consists of two indexes: the Convicted Offender Index (COI) and National Crime Scene Index (CSI-nat). There is also the Local Crime Scene Index (CSI-loc) which is maintained by local laboratories but not NDDB as local DNA profiles do not meet NDDB collection criteria. Another National Crime Scene Index (CSI-nat) is a collection of three labs operated by Royal Canadian Mounted Police (RCMP), Laboratory Sciences Judiciary Medicine Legal (LSJML) and Center of Forensic Sciences (CFS).

==== Dubai ====
In 2017 Dubai announced an initiative called Dubai 10X which was planned to create 'disruptive innovation' into the country. One of the projects in this initiative was a DNA database that would collect the genomes of all 3 million citizens of the country over a 10-year period. It was intended to use the data base for finding genetic causes of diseases and creating personalised medical treatments.

==== Germany ====
Germany set up its DNA database for the German Federal Police (BKA) in 1998. In late 2010, the database contained DNA profiles of over 700,000 individuals and in September 2016 it contained 1,162,304 entries. On 23 May 2011 in the "Stop the DNA Collection Frenzy!" campaign various civil rights and data protection organizations handed an open letter to the German minister of justice Sabine Leutheusser-Schnarrenberger asking her to take action in order to stop the "preventive expansion of DNA data-collection" and the "preemptive use of mere suspicions and of the state apparatus against individuals" and to cancel projects of international exchange of DNA data at the European and transatlantic level.

==== Israel ====
The Israeli national DNA database is called the Israel Police DNA Index System (IPDIS) which was established in 2007, and has a collection of more than 135,000 DNA profiles. The collection includes DNA profiles from suspected and accused persons and convicted offenders. The Israeli database also include an “elimination bank” of profiles from laboratory staff and other police personnel who may have contact with the forensic evidence in the course of their work.

In order to handle the high throughput processing and analysis of DNA samples from FTA cards, the Israeli Police DNA database has established a semi-automated program LIMS, which enables a small number of police to finish processing a large number of samples in a relatively small period of time, and it is also responsible for the future tracking of samples.

==== Kuwait ====
The Kuwaiti government passed a law in July 2015 requiring all citizens and permanent residents (4.2 million people) to have their DNA taken for a national database. The reason for this law was security concerns after the ISIS suicide bombing of the Imam Sadiq mosque. They planned to finish collecting the DNA by September 2016 which outside observers thought was optimistic. In October 2017 the Kuwait constitutional court struck down the law saying it was an invasion of personal privacy and the project was cancelled.

==== Brazil ====
In 1998, the Forensic DNA Research Institute of Federal District Civil Police created DNA databases of sexual assault evidence. In 2012, Brazil approved a national law establishing DNA databases at state and national levels regarding DNA typing of individuals convicted of violent crimes. Following the decree of the Presidency of the Republic of Brazil in 2013, which regulates the 2012 law, Brazil began using CODIS in addition to the DNA databases of sexual assault evidence to solve sexual assault crimes in Brazil.

==== France ====
France set up the DNA database called FNAEG in 1998. By December 2009, there were 1.27 million profiles on FNAEG.

==== Russia ====
In Russia, scientific DNA testing is being actively carried out in order to study the genetic diversity of the peoples of Russia in the framework of the state task - to learn from DNA to determine the probable territory of human origin based on data on the majority of the peoples of the country. On June 16, 2017, the Council of Ministers of the Union State of Belarus and Russia adopted Resolution No. 26, in which it approved the scientific and technical program of the Union State "Development of innovative genogeographic and genomic technologies for identification of personality and individual characteristics of a person based on the study of gene pools of the regions of the Union State" (DNA - identification).

Within the framework of this program, it is also planned to include the peoples of neighboring countries, which are the main source of migration, into the genogeographic study on the basis of existing collections.

In accordance with the Federal Law of December 3, 2008 No. 242-FZ "On state genomic registration in the Russian Federation", voluntary state genomic registration of citizens of the Russian Federation, as well as foreign citizens and stateless persons living or temporarily staying in the territory of the Russian Federation on the basis of a written application and on a paid basis. Genomic information obtained as a result of state genomic registration is used, among other things, for the purpose of establishing family relationships of wanted (identified) persons. The form of keeping records of data on genomic registration of citizens is the Federal Genomic Information Database (FBDGI).

Articles 10 and 11 of the Federal Law of July 27, 2006 No. 152-FZ "On Personal Data" provide that the processing of special categories of personal data relating to race, nationality, political views, religious or philosophical beliefs, health status, intimate life is allowed if it is necessary in connection with the implementation of international agreements of the Russian Federation on readmission and is carried out in accordance with the legislation of the Russian Federation on citizenship of the Russian Federation. Information characterizing the physiological and biological characteristics of a person, on the basis of which it is possible to establish his identity (biometric personal data), can be processed without the consent of the subject of personal data in connection with the implementation of international agreements of the Russian Federation on readmission, administration of justice and execution of judicial acts, compulsory state fingerprinting registration, as well as in cases stipulated by the legislation of the Russian Federation on defense, security, anti-terrorism, transport security, anti-corruption, operational investigative activities, public service, as well as in cases stipulated by the criminal-executive legislation of Russia, the legislation of Russia on the procedure for leaving the Russian Federation and entering the Russian Federation, citizenship of the Russian Federation and notaries.

==== Other European countries ====
In comparison with the other European countries, The Netherlands is the largest collector of DNA profiles of its citizens. At this moment the DNA databank at the Netherlands Forensic Institute contains the DNA profiles of over 316,000 Dutch citizens.

Contrary to the situation in most other European countries, the Dutch police have wide-ranging powers to take and retain DNA samples if a subject is convicted of a recordable offence, except when the conviction only involves paying a fine. If a subject refuses, for example because of privacy concerns, the Dutch police will use force.

In Sweden, only the DNA profiles of criminals who have spent more than two years in prison are stored. In Norway and Germany, court orders are required, and are only available, respectively, for serious offenders and for those convicted of certain offences and who are likely to reoffend. Austria started a criminal DNA database in 1997 and Italy also set one up in 2016 Switzerland started a temporary criminal DNA database in 2000 and confirmed it in law in 2005.

In 2005 the incoming Portuguese government proposed to introduce a DNA database of the entire population of Portugal. However, after informed debate including opinion from the Portuguese Ethics Council the database introduced was of just the criminal population.

Genuity Science (formerly Genomics Medicine Ireland) is an Irish life sciences company that was founded in 2015 to create a scientific platform to perform genomic studies and generate new disease prevention strategies and treatments. The company was founded by a group of life science entrepreneurs, investors and researchers and its scientific platform is based on work by Amgen’s Icelandic subsidiary, deCODE genetics, which has pioneered genomic population health studies. The company is building a genomic database which will include data from about 10 per cent of the Irish population, including patients with various diseases and healthy people. The idea of a private company owning public DNA data has raised concerns, with an Irish Times editorial stating: "To date, Ireland seems to have adopted an entirely commercial approach to genomic medicine. This approach places at risk the free availability of genomic data for scientific research that could benefit patients." The paper's editorial pointed out that this is in stark contrast to the approach the U.K. has taken, which is the publicly and charitably funded 100,000 Genomes Project being carried out by Genomics England.

==== China ====
By 2020, Chinese police had collected 80 million DNA profiles. There have been concerns that China may be using DNA data not just for crime solving, but for tracking activists, including Uyghurs.

Chinese have begun a $9 billion program for genetic science studying, Fire-Eye has DNA labs in over 20 countries.

==== India ====
India announced it will launch its genomic database by fall 2019. In the first phase of "Genome India" the genomic data of 10,000 Indians will be catalogued. The Department of Biotechnology (DBT) has initiated the project. The first private DNA bank in India is in Lucknow - the capital of Indian State Uttar Pradesh. Unlike a research center, this is available for Public to store their DNA by paying a minimum amount and four drops of blood.

=== Corporate ===
- Ancestry was reported to have collected 14 million DNA samples as of November 2018.
- 23andme's DNA database contained genetic information of over nine million people worldwide by 2019. The company explores selling the "anonymous aggregated genetic data" to other researchers and pharmaceutical companies for research purposes if patients give their consent. Ahmad Hariri, professor of psychology and neuroscience at Duke University who has been using 23andMe in his research since 2009 states that the most important aspect of the company's new service is that it makes genetic research accessible and relatively cheap for scientists. A study that identified 15 genome sites linked to depression in 23andMe's database lead to a surge in demands to access the repository with 23andMe fielding nearly 20 requests to access the depression data in the two weeks after publication of the paper.
- My Heritage said their database had 2.5 million profiles in 2019.
- Family Tree DNA was reported they had about two million people in their database in 2019.

== Compression ==
DNA databases occupy more storage when compared to other non DNA databases due to the enormous size of each DNA sequence. Every year DNA databases grow exponentially. This poses a major challenge to the storage, data transfer, retrieval and search of these databases. To address these challenges DNA databases are compressed to save storage space and bandwidth during the data transfers. They are decompressed during search and retrieval. Various compression algorithms are used to compress and decompress. The efficiency of any compression algorithm depends how well and fast it compresses and decompresses, which is generally measured in compression ratio. The greater the compression ratio, the better the efficiency of an algorithm. At the same time, the speed of compression and decompression are also considered for evaluation.

DNA sequences contain palindromic repetitions of A, C, T, G. Compression of these sequences involve locating and encoding these repetitions and decoding them during decompression.

Some approaches used to encode and decode are:

1. Huffman Encoding
2. Adaptive Huffman Encoding
3. Arithmetic coding
4. Adaptive arithmetic coding
5. Context tree weighting (CTW) method

The compression algorithms listed below may use one of the above encoding approaches to compress and decompress DNA database

1. Compression using Redundancy of DNA sets (COMRAD)
2. Relative Lempel-Ziv (RLZ)
3. GenCompress
4. BioCompress
5. DNACompress
6. CTW+LZ

In 2012, a team of scientists from Johns Hopkins University published the first genetic compression algorithm that does not rely on external genetic databases for compression. HAPZIPPER was tailored for HapMap data and achieves over 20-fold compression (95% reduction in file size), providing 2- to 4-fold better compression much faster than leading general-purpose compression utilities.

Genomic sequence compression algorithms, also known as DNA sequence compressors, explore the fact that DNA sequences have characteristic properties, such as inverted repeats. The most successful compressors are XM and GeCo. For eukaryotes XM is slightly better in compression ratio, though for sequences larger than 100 MB its computational requirements are impractical.

== Medicine ==
Many countries collect newborn blood samples to screen for diseases mainly with a genetic basis. Mainly these are destroyed soon after testing. In some countries the dried blood (and the DNA) is retained for later testing.

In Denmark the Danish Newborn Screening Biobank at Statens Serum Institut keeps a blood sample from people born after 1981. The purpose is to test for phenylketonuria and other diseases. However, it is also used for DNA profiling to identify deceased and suspected criminals. Parents can request that the blood sample of their newborn be destroyed after the result of the test is known.

== Privacy issues ==
Critics of DNA databases warn that the various uses of the technology can pose a threat to individual civil liberties. Personal information included in genetic material, such as markers that identify various genetic diseases, physical and behavioral traits, could be used for discriminatory profiling and its collection may constitute an invasion of privacy. Also, DNA can be used to establish paternity and whether or not a child is adopted. Nowadays, the privacy and security issues of DNA database has caused huge attention. Some people are afraid that their personal DNA information will be let out easily, others may define their DNA profiles recording in the Databases as a sense of "criminal", and being falsely accused in a crime can lead to having a "criminal" record for the rest of their lives.

UK laws in 2001 and 2003 allowed DNA profiles to be taken immediately after a person was arrested and kept in a Database even if the suspect was later acquitted. In response to public unease at these provisions, the UK later changed this by passing the Protection of Freedoms Act 2012 which required that those suspects not charged or found not guilty would have their DNA data deleted from the Database.

In European countries which have established a DNA database, there are some measures which are being used to protect the privacy of individuals, more specifically, some criteria to help removing the DNA profiles from the databases. Among the 22 European countries which have been analyzed, most of the countries will record the DNA profiles of suspects or those who have committed serious crimes. For some countries (like Belgium and France) may remove the criminal's profile after 30–40 years, because these “criminal investigation” database are no longer needed. Most of the countries will delete the suspect's profile after they are acquitted...etc. All the countries have a completed legislation to largely avoid the privacy issues which may occur during the use of DNA database. Public discussion around the introduction of advanced forensic techniques (such as genetic genealogy using public genealogy databases and DNA phenotyping approaches) has been limited, disjointed, and unfocused, and raises issues of privacy and consent that may warrant additional legal protections to be established.

Privacy issues surrounding DNA databases not only means privacy is threatened in collecting and analyzing DNA samples, it also exists in protecting and storing this important personal information. As the DNA profiles can be stored indefinitely in DNA database, it has raised concerns that these DNA samples can be used for new and unidentified purposes. With the increase of the users who access the DNA database, people are worried about their information being let out or shared inappropriately, for example, their DNA profile may be shared with others such as law enforcement agencies or countries without individual consent.

The application of DNA databases have been expanded into two controversial areas: arrestees and familial searching. An arrestee is a person arrested for a crime and who has not yet been convicted for that offense. Currently, 21 states in the United States have passed legislation that allows law enforcement to take DNA from an arrestee and enter it into the state's CODIS DNA database to see if that person has a criminal record or can be linked to any unsolved crimes. In familial searching, the DNA database is used to look for partial matches that would be expected between close family members. This technology can be used to link crimes to the family members of suspects and thereby help identify a suspect when the perpetrator has no DNA sample in the database.

Furthermore, DNA databases could fall into the wrong hands due to data breaches or data sharing.

== DNA collection and human rights ==
In a judgement in December 2008, the European Court of Human Rights ruled that two British men should not have had their DNA and fingerprints retained by police saying that retention "could not be regarded as necessary in a democratic society".

The DNA fingerprinting pioneer Professor Sir Alec Jeffreys condemned UK government plans to keep the genetic details of hundreds of thousands of innocent people in England and Wales for up to 12 years. Jeffreys said he was "disappointed" with the proposals, which came after a European court ruled that the current policy breaches people's right to privacy. Jefferys said "It seems to be as about as minimal a response to the European court of human rights judgment as one could conceive. There is a presumption not of innocence but of future guilt here … which I find very disturbing indeed".

== Effects on crime ==
A 2021 study found that registration of Danish criminal offenders in a DNA database substantially reduced the probability of re-offending, as well as increased the likelihood that re-offenders were identified if they committed future crimes.

A 2017 study in the American Economic Journal: Applied Economics showed that databases of criminal offenders' DNA profiles in US states "deter crime by profiled offenders, reduce crime rates, and are more cost-effective than traditional law enforcement tools."

== Monozygotic twins ==
Monozygotic twins share around 99.99% of their DNA, while other siblings share around 50%. Some next generation sequencing tools are capable of detecting rare de novo mutations in only one of the twins (detectable in rare single nucleotide polymorphisms). Most DNA testing tools would not detect these rare SNPs in most twins.

Each person's DNA is unique to them to the slight exception of identical (monozygotic and monospermotic) twins, who start out from the identical genetic line of DNA but during the twinning event have incredibly small mutations which can be detected now (for all intents and purposes, compared to all other humans and even to theoretical "clones, [who would not share the same uterus nor experience the same mutations pre-twinning event]" identical twins have more identical DNA than is probably possible to achieve between any other two humans). Tiny differences between identical twins can now (2014) be detected by next generation sequencing. For current fiscally available testing, "identical" twins cannot be easily differentiated by the most common DNA testing, but it has been shown to be possible. While other siblings (including fraternal twins) share about 50% of their DNA, monozygotic twins share virtually 99.99%. Beyond these more recently discovered twinning-event mutation disparities, since 2008 it has been known that people who are identical twins also each have their own set of copy number variants, which can be thought of as the number of copies they each personally exhibit for certain sections of DNA.

== See also ==
- Combined DNA Index System (CODIS)
- DNA profiling
- Forensic Science Service
- Government databases
- LGC Forensics
- UK National DNA Database
