= Second Generation Multiplex =

Second Generation Multiplex is a DNA profiling system used in the United Kingdom to set up the UK National DNA Database in 1995. It is manufactured by ABI (Applied Biosystems).

It contains primers for the following STR (Short Tandem Repeat) loci: VWA (HUMVWF31/A), D8 (D8S1179), D21 (D21S11), D18 (D18S51), THO (HUMTHO1), and FGA (HUMFIBRA).

It also contains primers for the Amelogenin sex indicating test.

The primers are tagged with the following fluorescent dyes for detection under electrophoresis: 5-FAM, JOE, and NED.

Its use in the United kingdom as the DNA profiling system used by The UK National DNA Database was superseded by the Second Generation Multiplex Plus SGM+ DNA profiling system in 1998.
