= R v Rodgers =

- Supreme Court of Canada

Hearing: November 15, 2005 Judgment: April 27, 2006
- Full case name: Her Majesty The Queen v Dennis Rodgers
- Citations: 2006 SCC 15, [2006] 1 S.C.R. 554
- Ruling: Crown appeal allowed

Court membership
- Chief Justice: Beverley McLachlin; Puisne Justices: Michel Bastarache, Ian Binnie, Louis LeBel, Marie Deschamps, Morris Fish, Rosalie Abella, Louise Charron

Reasons given
- Majority: Charron J., joined by McLachlin C.J. and Bastarache and Abella JJ.
- Dissent: Fish J., joined by Binnie and Deschamps JJ.

R v Rodgers, 2006 SCC 15, [2006] 1 S.C.R. 554, is a case decided by the Supreme Court of Canada on the constitutionality of the collection of blood samples from prisoners. The Court upheld the Criminal Code provision allowing for retroactive DNA samples of prisoners without notice.

== Background ==
Dennis Rodgers was a convicted sex offender who was serving his sentence in an Ontario prison. Since Rodgers was sentenced before the enactment of the 1998 DNA Identification Act, his blood sample was not taken upon sentencing to be placed in the national database. Under the section 487.055(1)(c) of the Criminal Code, the Crown applied for an ex parte application for the DNA sample. Rodgers challenged the application on the basis that the enabling Code provision violated the rights within Canadian Charter of Rights and Freedoms.

== Opinion of the Court ==
In a four to three decision the Court upheld the Code provisions. Justice Charron, writing for the majority found that the state's interest in his personal information was sufficient to outweigh Rodger's right to privacy. She noted that the DNA sample is akin to a finger print and will only be used for identification purposes. She also found that the provision is procedurally fair and was a clear articulation of the legislature's intent.

== See also ==
- List of Supreme Court of Canada cases (McLachlin Court)
