= United Kingdom National DNA Database =

UK database of DNA records, established in 1995

The United Kingdom National DNA Database (NDNAD; officially the UK National Criminal Intelligence DNA Database) is a national DNA Database that was set up in 1995. Its existence is aimed at aiding police forces investigate crime.

In 2020 it had 6.6 million profiles (5.6 million individuals excluding duplicates). 270,000 samples were added to the database in 2019–20, populated by samples recovered from crime scenes and taken from police suspects. 124,000 were deleted for those not charged or not found guilty. There were 731,000 matches of unsolved crimes between 2001 and 2020.

Only patterns of short tandem repeats are stored in the NDNAD – not a person's full genomic sequence. Since 2014 sixteen loci of the DNA-17 system are analysed, resulting in a string of 32 numbers, being two allele repeats from each of the sixteen loci. Amelogenin is used for a rapid test of a donor's sex. Scotland has used 21 STR loci, two Y-DNA markers and the gender identifier since 2014.

However, individuals' skin or blood samples are also kept permanently linked to the database and can contain complete genetic information. Because DNA is inherited, the database can also be used to indirectly identify many others in the population related to a database subject. Stored samples can also degrade and become useless, particularly those taken with dry brushes and swabs.

The UK NDNAD is run by the Home Office, after transferring from the custodianship of the National Policing Improvement Agency (NPIA) on 1 October 2012. A major expansion to include all known active offenders was funded between April 2000 and March 2005 at a cost of over £300 million.

== Origin and function ==
The United Kingdom's National DNA Database (NDNAD) was set up in 1995 using the Second Generation Multiplex (SGM) DNA profiling system (SGM+ DNA profiling system since 1998). All data held on the National DNA Database is governed by a tri-partite board consisting of the Home Office, the National Police Chiefs’ Council and the Association of Police and Crime Commissioners, there are also independent representatives present from the Human Genetics Commission. The data held on the NDNAD is owned by the police authority which submitted the sample for analysis. The samples are stored permanently by the companies that analyse them, for an annual fee.

All forensic service providers in the UK which meet the accredited standards can interact with the NDNAD. The UK's NDNAD is the foremost and largest forensic DNA database of its kind in the world – containing nearly 10% of the population, compared to 0.5% in the USA.

The data held on the National DNA Database consists of both demographic sample data and the numerical DNA profile. Records on the NDNAD are held for both individuals sampled under the Police and Criminal Evidence Act 1984 (PACE) and for unsolved crime-stains (such as from blood, semen, saliva, hair and cellular materials left at a crime scene)

Whenever a new profile is submitted, the NDNAD's records are automatically searched for matches (hits) between individuals and unsolved crime-stain records and unsolved crime-stain to unsolved crime-stain records - linking both individuals to crimes and crimes to crimes. Matches between individuals only are reported separately for investigation as to whether one is an alias of the other. Any NDNAD hits obtained are reported directly to the police force which submitted the sample for analysis. The NDNAD is widely acknowledged as an intelligence tool, for its ability to aid in the solving of crimes, both past and present. One-off speculative intelligence searches can be initiated by scientists in instances where a crime-stain DNA profile does not meet the required standard for loading to the NDNAD. These searches can produce many matches which may be restricted by demographic data.

The latest innovative intelligence approach brought forward by the Forensic Science Service, is in the use of familial searching. This is a process that may be carried out in relation to unsolved crime-stains whereby a suspect's DNA may not be held on the NDNAD, but that of a close relative is. This method identifies potential relatives by identifying DNA profiles held on the NDNAD that are similar. 16 familial searches were carried out in 2019–20. Again many matches may be produced which may be restricted by demographic data. However, this technique raises new privacy concerns because it could lead to the police identifying cases of non-paternity.

== Control transferred to the National Policing Improvement Agency in 2007 ==
In April 2007, responsibility for the delivery of National DNA Database (NDNAD) services was transferred from the Home Office to the National Policing Improvement Agency (NPIA). The agency's role was to run the database operations and maintain and ensure the integrity of the data, and to oversee the National DNA Database service so that it is operated in line with agreed standards.

=== Database subjects ===
==== England and Wales ====
Though initially only samples from convicted criminals, or people awaiting trial, were recorded, the Criminal Justice and Police Act 2001 changed this to allow DNA to be retained from people charged with an offence, even if they were subsequently acquitted. The Criminal Justice Act 2003 later allowed DNA to be taken on arrest, rather than on charge. Between 2004 when this law came into force and 2012, anyone arrested in England and Wales on suspicion of involvement in any recordable offence (all except the most minor offences) had their DNA sample taken and stored in the database, whether or not they are subsequently charged or convicted. In 2005-06 45,000 crimes were matched against records on the DNA Database; including 422 homicides (murders and manslaughters) and 645 rapes. However, not all these matches would have led to criminal convictions and some would be matches with innocent people who were at the crime scene. Critics argued that the decision to keep large numbers of innocent people on the database did not appear to have increased the likelihood of solving a crime using DNA. Since the Protection of Freedoms Act 2012, those not charged or not found guilty must have their DNA data deleted within a specified period of time.

==== Scotland ====
The PFSLD houses the DNA database for Scotland, and exports copies to the National DNA Database in England.

Only samples from convicted criminals, or people awaiting trial, are recorded, although a new law will allow the DNA from people charged with a serious sexual or violent offence to be kept for up to five years after acquittal.

==== Isle of Man ====
Samples collected by the Isle of Man Constabulary's Scientific Support Department from crime scenes are sent to the UK for testing against the database. Samples from suspects are also added to the database, but are removed if the suspect is not convicted of the crime.

==== Channel Islands ====
Data supplied by the police of Jersey and Guernsey is also stored on the database.

== Legal challenges ==
The issue of taking fingerprints and a DNA sample was involved in a case decided at the High Court in March 2006. A teacher who was accused of assault won the right to have her DNA sample and fingerprints destroyed. They had been taken whilst she was in custody, but after the Crown Prosecution Service had decided to not pursue any charges against her. She should have been released expeditiously once this was the case and so her continued detention to obtain samples was unlawful, and thus the samples were taken "without appropriate authority". Had they been taken before the decision not to prosecute, the samples would have been lawful and retained as normal under the rules at the time. After the 2012 Protection of Freedoms Act, they would have had to be destroyed within a specified period of time.

=== European Court of Human Rights ===
The DNA Database's indefinite retention policy was abolished by the 2012 Protection of Freedoms Act. Before that, a test case was filed by two claimants from Sheffield, Mr. S. and Michael Marper, both of whom had fingerprint records and DNA profiles held in the database. S and Marper were supported by the Liberty and Privacy International, non-profit pressure groups who were permitted to make amicus brief submissions to the court.

S. was a minor, at 11 years old, when he was arrested and charged with attempted robbery on 19 January 2001; he was acquitted a few months later, on 14 June 2001. Michael Marper was arrested on 13 March 2001, and charged with harassment of his partner; the charge was not pressed because Marper and his partner became reconciled before a pretrial review had taken place.

In November 2004 the Court of Appeal held that the keeping of samples from persons charged, yet not convicted - i.e. S and Marper - was lawful. However, an appeal was made to the European Court of Human Rights and the case was heard on 27 February 2008. On 4 December 2008, 17 judges unanimously ruled that there had been a violation of Article 8 of the European Convention on Human Rights, which refers to a person's right to a private life, and awarded €42,000 each to the appellants. The judges said keeping the information "could not be regarded as necessary in a democratic society".

In response to this the Home Office announced in May 2009 a consultation on how they would comply with the ruling. The Home Office proposed to continue retaining indefinitely the DNA profiles of anyone convicted of any recordable offence, but to remove other profiles from the database after a period of time - generally 6 or 12 years, depending on the seriousness of the offence. The practice of taking DNA profiles upon arrest was not affected by the decision. In April 2010 the Crime and Security Act 2010 established that DNA profiles and fingerprints of anyone convicted of a recordable offence would be stored permanently, while those obtained on arrest, even when no conviction follows, would be stored for 6 years, renewable on new arrests.

On 18 May 2011 the UK supreme court also ruled, by a majority, that the ACPO DNA retention guidelines at the time were unlawful because they were incompatible with article 8 of the ECHR. However, not wishing to step on the toes of Parliament discussing the same issue, they granted no other relief.

Finally on 1 May 2012 the Protection of Freedoms Act 2012 received Royal Assent. This act allowed the police to retain fingerprint and DNA data on NDNAD indefinitely for most people convicted of a recordable crime. Those not charged or not found guilty must have their DNA data deleted within a specified period of time.

== Privacy concerns ==
The UK DNA database is one of the world's largest, and has prompted concerns from some quarters as to its scope and usage. Recordable offences include begging, being drunk and disorderly and taking part in an illegal demonstration.

The use of the database for genetic research without consent has also been controversial, as has the storage of DNA samples and sensitive information by the commercial companies which analyse them for the police.

Given the privacy issues, but set against the usefulness of the database in identifying offenders, some have argued for a system whereby the encrypted data associated with a sample is held by a third, trusted, party and is only revealed if a crime scene sample is found to contain that DNA. Such an approach has been advocated by the inventor of genetic fingerprinting, Alec Jeffreys.

Others have argued that there should be time limits on how long DNA profiles can be retained on the Database, except for people convicted of serious violent or sexual offences. GeneWatch UK has launched a campaign calling on people to reclaim their DNA if they have not been charged or convicted of a serious offence, and has called for more safeguards to prevent misuse of the database. The Human Genetics Commission has argued that individuals' DNA samples should be destroyed after the DNA profiles used for identification purposes have been obtained.

The Liberal Democrats believed that innocent people's DNA should not be held on the database indefinitely. They launched a national online petition arguing that whilst they believe "DNA is a vital tool in the fight against crime, there was no legitimate reason for the police to retain for life the DNA records of innocent people." They revealed figures in November 2007 showing that nearly 150,000 children under the age of 16 have their details on the database.

The Conservative Party objected to the database on the grounds that Parliament had not been given the opportunity to vote on it. Damian Green, former Tory home affairs spokesman, issued a press release in January 2006 stating: "We do have concerns about the Government including on the database the DNA and fingerprints of completely innocent people.... If the Government wants a database which has the details of everyone, not just criminals, they should be honest about it and not construct it by stealth." Mr Green had his own DNA profile on the database for a time having been arrested and subsequently released without charge on 27 November 2008.

A YouGov poll published on 4 December 2006, indicated that 48% of those interviewed disapproved of keeping DNA records of those who have not been charged with any crime, or who have been acquitted, with 37% in favour.

In early 2007, five civil servants were suspended and sued in the High Court by the Forensic Science Service after being accused of industrial espionage and for allegedly copying confidential information and using it to establish a rival firm.

In 2009 the Home Office consulted on plans to extend the period of DNA retention to twelve years for serious crimes and six years for other crimes. According to the official figures, enough searches (around 2.5 trillion by 2009) had been run on the NDNAD such that statistically at least two matches (a 1 in a trillion chance, under ideal conditions) should have arisen by chance. However, depending on factors such as the number of incomplete profiles and the presence of related individuals, the chance matches might actually be higher. However the official position was that no chance matches have occurred, a position backed up by the fact that the majority of the searches would have been repeated, and that there are not 1 trillion unique DNA profiles on file.

In July 2009, a lawyer, Lorraine Elliot, was arrested on accusations of forgery which were quickly proven to be false. A DNA sample was taken from her and logged. She was cleared of the accusations a day later and exonerated. However, Mrs Elliot subsequently lost her job (even though she was completely innocent of any crime) when the fact that her DNA profile was stored on the national database was discovered during a subsequent work-related security check. In 2010 she was finally able to have her details removed from the database.

== Racial demographics and controversy ==
Census data and Home Office statistics indicated that by 2007 almost 40% of black men had their DNA profile on the database compared to 13% of Asian men and 9% of white men.

In July 2006, the Black Police Association called for an inquiry into why the database held details of 37% of black men but fewer than 10% of white men.

In November 2006, similar concerns were raised by the Sunday Telegraph which claimed that three in four young black men were on the DNA database.

According to the Sunday Telegraph, an estimated 135,000 black males aged 15 to 34 would have been added to the DNA database by April 2007, equivalent to 77 per cent of the young black male population in England and Wales.

By contrast, only 22 per cent of young white males, and six per cent of the general population, would be on the database.

This figure was confirmed by the British Government's own Human Genetics Commission 2009 report on the topic, titled Nothing to hide, nothing to fear? Balancing individual rights and the public interest in the governance and use of the National DNA Database, which said that "the profiles of over three quarters of young black men between the ages of 18 and 35 are recorded."

One explanation for the racial disparities is racial bias towards certain demographics, as evidenced by the reaction of the then chair of the home affairs select committee, Keith Vaz MP, in August 2009 who said that "Such disparity in the treatment of different ethnic groups is bound to lead to a disintegration of community relations and a lack of trust in the police force."

These allegations have been refuted by the National Policing Improvement Agency (NPIA), which used to run the National DNA database. According to the NPIA, the database is a successful tool in fighting crime and points out that "between April 09 and 28th January 2010 the National DNA Database produced 174 matches to murder, 468 to rapes and 27,168 to other crime scenes."

In addition, the NPIA says that the ¨National¨ DNA Database continues to provide police with the most effective tool for the prevention and detection of crime since the development of fingerprint analysis over 100 years ago. Since 1998, more than 300,000 crimes have been detected with the aid of the Database, reassuring the public that offenders are more likely to be brought to justice."

Profiles retained on the DNA Database by ethnic appearance as of 2015 were; 76% White North European, 2.1% White South European, 7.5% black, 5.2% Asian, 0.8% Middle Eastern, 0.6% Chinese, Japanese or South East Asian, and 8.0% unknown.

== Potential expansion of database ==
The idea of expanding the database to cover the entire UK population has drawn some support as well as strong criticism from experts such as the Nuffield Council on Bioethics, but been rejected for the moment by the UK government as impractical and problematic for civil liberties. Supporters included Lord Justice Sedley and some police officers, and Tony Blair said in 2006 that he could see no reason why the DNA of everyone should not ultimately be kept on record. Opponents of the expansion include Reclaim Your DNA, backed by No2ID, GeneWatch and Liberty among others. Shami Chakrabarti, director of Liberty, said in 2007 that a database for every man, woman and child in the country was "a chilling proposal, ripe for indignity, error and abuse".

== See also ==
- National DNA database
- Mass surveillance in the United Kingdom
- National Identity Register
- Police National Computer
- Crimint
- National Ballistics Intelligence Service
