= Department of Defense Serum Repository =

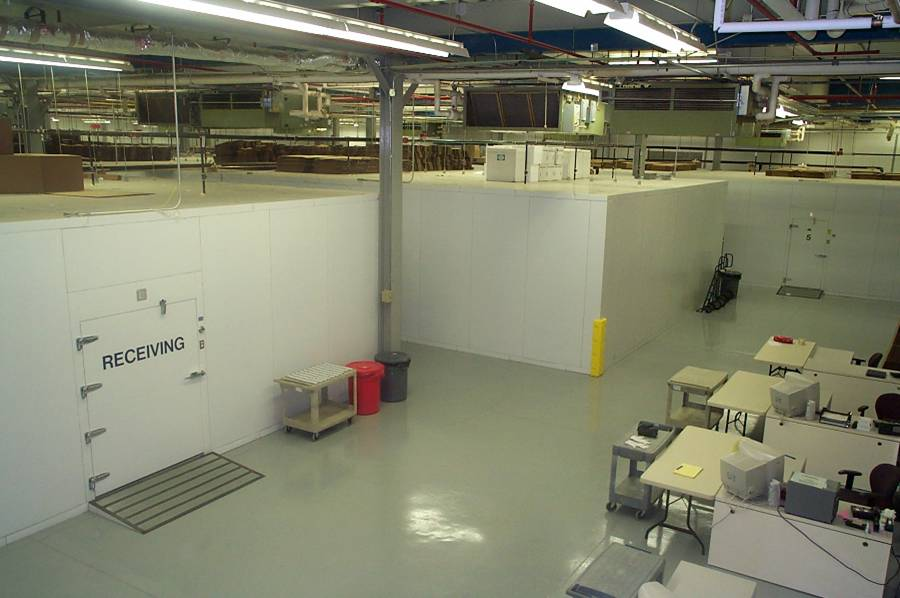
Interior of the United States Department of Defense Serum Repository (DoDSR).

The Department of Defense Serum Repository (also referred to as the DoD Serum Repository or simply DoDSR) is a biological repository operated by the United States Department of Defense containing over 50,000,000 human serum specimens, collected primarily from applicants to and members of the United States Uniformed Services.

The DoDSR is located in Silver Spring, Maryland and is operated by the Armed Forces Health Surveillance Center (AFHSC), a subordinate of the United States Army Center for Health Promotion and Preventive Medicine (USACHPPM), itself evolved from the Johns Hopkins School of Hygiene and Public Health. The DoDSR traces its origins to 1985 and the beginnings of the United States Armed Forces HIV screening program (originally referred to as the HTLV-III screening program), when serum remaining after periodic laboratory testing of service members was retained first by the Walter Reed Army Institute of Research (WRAIR), then later systematically archived in the Army/Navy Serum Repository, the precursor to the DoDSR.

Today the DoDSR is among the largest serum repositories in the world, in terms of numbers of individuals represented, number of longitudinal specimens stored per individual, and total quantity of serum. The majority of specimens are linked to detailed medical and personnel data, creating a valuable resource for retrospective research and public health surveillance. The DoDSR's longitudinal serum, collected systematically from a large population, has enabled major contributions to understanding the etiology of many health conditions not otherwise amenable to prospective study, including multiple sclerosis, schizophrenia, autoimmune diseases and cancer.

== History ==
The earliest serum housed in the DoDSR was collected through the Armed Forces' HLTV-III screening program, implemented in 1985 in response to the emergence of a new human virus, subsequently known as Human Immunodeficiency Virus (HIV). Early laboratory testing was performed via contracted private laboratories. Screening soon expanded to all civilian applicants processed at Military Entrance Processing Stations. A condition of some early laboratory testing contracts specified that remnant serum were to remain in frozen storage. In 1989, the Army's Walter Reed Army Institute of Research (WRAIR) awarded a contract to McKesson to consolidate and store accumulated residual serum specimens at a single facility, established in proximity to WRAIR in Rockville, Maryland. The HIV Research Program (established by Congressional Direction in 1986), under the WRAIR Division of Retrovirology, established the Walter Reed Army Serum Repository, which would evolve to become the Army/Navy Serum Repository in 1989. In 2001, the repository inventory was moved to its current location, a 25,000-square-foot (2,300 m^{2}) facility in Silver Spring, Maryland. In recent years, the DoDSR has grown by approximately 1.9-2.3 million specimens annually. By 2007, the DoDSR inventory had grown to over 44 million specimens, and by the end of 2009, over 50,000,000 specimens.

=== Growth of the DoDSR Inventory ===
==== HIV Seronegative Specimens ====
The DoDSR, along with its precursor repositories, were designated as the ultimate storage facility for all serologically negative HIV specimens obtained through military HIV testing programs. Growing initially through the routine screening of all civilian applicants, and then through the continued screening of retained military personnel (at approximate two year intervals), by 1990 the DoDSR inventory had grown to contain over six million serum specimens, and by 1996 over 17 million specimens. Standardized processes in place at the contracted military HIV testing laboratories ensured efficient management of the growing inventory, permitting the DoDSR to enforce standards in specimen labelling, configuration, and shipment of specimens which facilitated their physical integration into the DoDSR inventory. Contracts for HIV testing, negotiated by the individual military services, covered all specimens shipped from Military Treatment Facilities for HIV testing within the United States; for this reason unless specifically removed, serum from military beneficiaries (i.e. spouses and children) would also find their way into the DoDSR inventory.

==== Addition of Pre- and Post-Deployment Specimens ====
Prompted by experiences in the aftermath of the Persian Gulf War, including claims by many service members of adverse health outcomes, the December, 1995 deployment of U.S. service members to Bosnia was accompanied by increased emphasis on health surveillance. A 1996 Assistant Secretary of Defense for Health Affairs memorandum mandated the collection of pre- and post-deployment serum specimens from deploying service members, and their integration into the DoDSR. The policy also directed that specimens collected for HIV surveillance could suffice. Although a small number of specimens were collected directly for health surveillance outside of existing HIV testing channels, specimens collected in this manner suffered from lack of standardization. By 1999, the Assistant Secretary of Defense issued modified instructions, which directed that the requirement for pre- and post-deployment specimens be satisfied by HIV testing. Initially, an HIV specimen was required to be collected prior to deployment if none had been collected in the year prior.

Concerns over the adequacy of specimens collected for this purpose, including findings of the Rhode Island Gulf War Commission, contributed to public concern over the adequacy of existing serum collection practices. The FY2005 Defense Authorization Act called on the Department of Defense to perform

[a]n assessment of whether there is a need for changes to regulations and standards for drawing blood samples for effective tracking and health surveillance of the medical conditions of personnel before deployment, upon the end of a deployment, and for a followup period of appropriate length.

Additionally, this legislation required DoD to change its policies to require collection of an HIV specimen within 120 days pre-deployment and 30 days post-deployment. This change was later rescinded in conjunction with the later recommendations of the Armed Forces Epidemiological Board, to permit a sample collected within the year prior to deployment to meet requirements. Despite the many changes in policies, the large numbers of service members deploying in support of Operations Iraqi Freedom and Enduring Freedom have led to a moderate increase in the rate of specimen acquisition and growth of the DoDSR inventory.

=== Evolution of the DoDSR Mission and Custody ===
The DoDSR has evolved from a research-affiliated repository limited to storing HIV seronegative specimens, to a repository serving a broad health surveillance mission for which it was not originally intended.

The first officially articulated purpose of the DoDSR is found in a 1991 WRAIR solicitation for the management of the precursor to the DoDSR:

Sera repository operations are required for retrospective studies in support of current and future retroviral research efforts ... Analysis of these sera will be very important.

The WRAIR solicitation anticipated as-needed specimen retrieval of up to 5,000 specimens per year.

In 1995, responsibility and custody of the DoDSR inventory and its associated database was transferred from WRAIR to a newly formed subordinate command of the United States Army Medical Command, the United States Army Center for Health Promotion and Preventive Medicine (USACHPPM). USACHPPM, or simply CHPPM, itself evolved from the U.S. Army Industrial Hygiene Laboratory, which was initially established in 1942 at the beginning of World War II at the Johns Hopkins School of Hygiene, now the Johns Hopkins Bloomberg School of Public Health. The change in custody was accompanied by an increased emphasis on the epidemiologic, public health and health surveillance utility of DoDSR specimens.

A DoD Instruction issued in 1997, since rescinded, described the purpose of the DoDSR as being for

medical surveillance for clinical diagnosis and epidemiological studies. The repository shall be used exclusively for the identification, prevention, and control of diseases associated with operational deployments of military personnel.

A subsequent DoD Directive, DoDD 6490.02E, expanded authorized uses of the DoDSR slightly:

There shall be a Department of Defense Serum Repository for medical surveillance for clinical diagnosis and epidemiological studies. The repository shall be used for the identification, prevention, and control of diseases associated with military service.

=== Rationale for Current Practices ===
Responding to concerns outlined in the FY2005 Defense Authorization Act, the Assistant Secretary of Defense for Health Affairs requested the Armed Forces Epidemiological Board (AFEB) address three questions related to the mission and operation of the DoDSR:

- Is there a sound basis for the continued routine collection of sera pre- and post-deployment for clinical care reasons, public health surveillance or research purposes in order to examine the effects of deployment on health?
- Should any other biological specimens be collected for clinical care reasons, public health surveillance, or research purposes?
- Are there any valid reasons to change the time frames of specimens of collected biological specimens either pre- or post-deployment for clinical care reasons, public health surveillance, or research purposes?

The AFEB study determined that there was sound basis for the continued collection of serum, but recommending the additional collection of white blood cells in addition to serum. The AFEB study also recommended that the DoD establish an oversight panel be created to govern access to the specimens. Neither recommendation has yet been acted on.

== Present DoDSR ==
=== Location ===
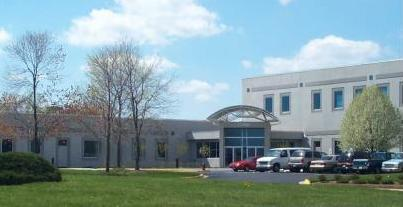
Exterior of the United States Department of Defense Serum Repository (DoDSR), located at 11800 Tech Road, Silver Spring, MD.

The DoDSR facility is located in 25,283 square feet (2,348.9 m^{2}) of leased commercial space in a 90,000-square-foot (8,400 m^{2}) building located at 11800 Tech Road, Silver Spring, Maryland. The leased space was acquired through a ten-year lease managed by the General Services Administration (GSA) which expires October 1, 2010.

The commercial facility is shared with two other major tenants: Holy Cross Hospital, and Comcast, whose continued occupancy precludes contiguous expansion of the DoDSR inventory. Due to space constraints at the existing facility, relocation of the DoDSR inventory to another location in the Baltimore - National Capital region (including Ft. Meade, Maryland) was considered as early as 2005.

==== Considerations under BRAC ====
Although AFHCS maintains technical and computing facilities supporting the DoDSR at the Walter Reed Army Medical Center (WRAMC), Washington, D.C. and is subject to realignment under the recommendations of the Base Realignment and Closure (BRAC) Commission, published BRAC recommendations do not specify a location to which the facilities must relocate. Relocation of the WRAMC AFHSC facilities are necessary by September 15, 2011.

=== Contracted Operation ===
The DoDSR is operated by Thermo Fisher Scientific under a no-bid or "sole-source" contract awarded in 2006. An earlier no-bid contract was awarded to Cryonix in 2005, although Cryonix was later incorporated under Thermo Electron Corporation's Biorepository Services division Thermo Electron subsequently merged with Fisher Scientific in 2006. Thermo Fisher's Fisher BioServices business currently holds the contract.

=== Freezer Equipment ===
The DoDSR consists of 15 large walk-in freezers, each approximately 30 feet (9.1 m) x 30 feet x 10 high, whose interiors are maintained at -30 °C by pairs of compressors.

=== Serum Storage ===
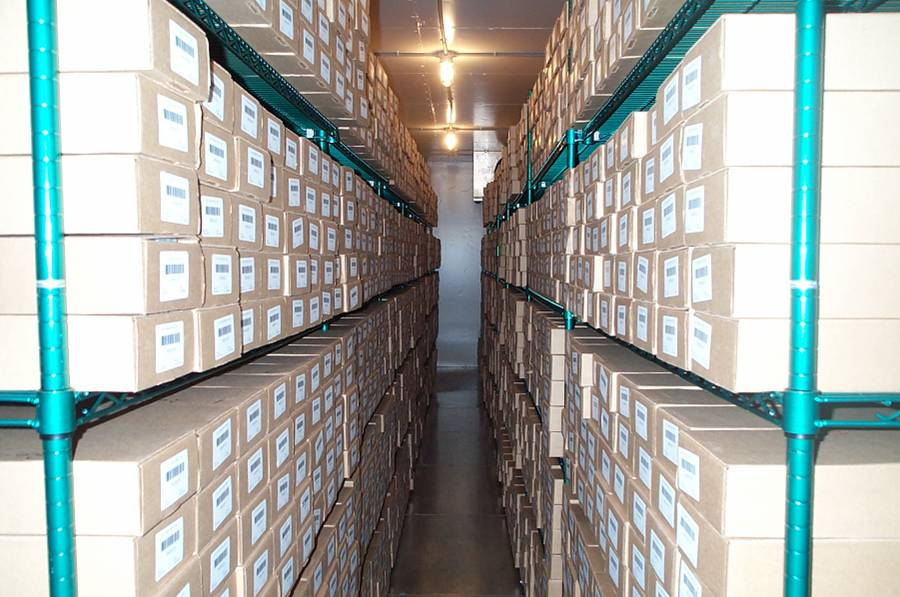
Interior of one of 15 of the large walk-in freezers in the DoDSR.

The majority of serum specimens are stored inside the walk-in freezers in cardboard boxes, approximately 6 x 18 x 3.5 inches (89 mm) in size, each containing 308 specimens, and each consisting of approximately 2.5 mL of frozen serum The cardboard boxes are sequentially numbered and labeled, and stored on metal shelving units within the walk-in freezers for ready accessibility and retrieval.

Due to storage constraints, approximately 5.5 million specimens from two walk-in freezers were placed into "high-density" configuration in 2006, and additional reconfiguration may be required. The current operations contract calls for the contractor to "adjust the storage configurations of specimens in one or more freezers to accommodate high-density, boxed specimen storage" as required.

=== Transportation of Specimens to the DoDSR ===
The majority of specimens are received quarterly in frozen form, following completion of all HIV testing. Shipments arrive in pallets transported in a freezer truck from the major contracted testing laboratory, ViroMed, which is located in Minnetonka, Minnesota.

In 2008, the DoDSR procured a specialized freezer truck to transport specimens to the DoDSR, and solicited a bid for more frequent transport of specimens to the repository .

== Data Linkages ==
DoDSR inventory data and related information are stored in an Oracle database referred to as the Defense Medical Surveillance System (DMSS), which serves as the "sole link" to the DoDSR inventory. Serum specimens are identified by a unique specimen identification number, which for the majority of specimens are linked to the Social Security Number of the donor, and the date the specimen was obtained.

In addition to inventory data, DMSS also integrates select medical outcomes data available through the Military Health System (MHS), including International Classification of Diseases, 9th Edition, Clinical Modification (ICD-9CM) diagnosis codes, Current Procedural Terminology (CPT) codes, and other pertinent administrating data from inpatient and outpatient encountered provided directly by the MHS or through Tricare managed care services.

Active duty component service members (unlike service members in the Reserve components), are entitled to free (or nearly free) health care for the duration of their military service, the details of which are captured electronically in DMSS. The active duty component thus constitutes a cohort where health events can be assessed longitudinally with minimal ascertainment bias. Over half of the specimens in the DoDSR are traceable to service members who have been on active duty, and 75% of active duty service members have provided three or more longitudinal specimens.

Limited additional health and personnel data linked to DoDSR specimens include records of immunizations, overseas deployments, military assignment data, and records from pre- and post-deployment health assessments.

=== Links to Other Available Data ===
Significant additional MHS administrative and clinical data exist which are not integrated into DMSS. These include:

- Records of pharmaceuticals dispensed at MHS outpatient pharmacies and through the outsourced civilian retail and mail-order pharmacy, available through the DoD Pharmacoeconomics Center's (PEC) Pharmacy Data Transaction Service (PDTS).
- Records of Health Level 7 (HL7) coded results of microbiology, chemistry, and hematology laboratory tests, available through the MHS.
- Family history, risk factor data, available through the MHS Armed Forces Health Longitudinal Technology Application (AHLTA) Electronic Medical Record system.
- Information on confirmed cancer diagnoses available in the Automated Central Tumor Registry (ACTUR).

Recent AFHSC solicitations have requested additional staff to address these data shortfalls.

=== Linkages to Other DoD Biological Repositories ===
The Department of Defense, through the Armed Forces Institute of Pathology operates the AFIP Tissue Repository, which contains approximately 3 million case files and associated paraffin blocks, microscopic glass slides, and formalin-fixed tissue specimens from pathologic examinations occurring throughout the Military Health System. Thousands of cases are added to the repository each year. With the disestablishment of the AFIP under Base Realignment and Closure, management of the Tissue Repository was to have been transferred to the Uniformed Services University of the Health Sciences. However, Public Law 110-181 Section 722 directed the President to establish a Joint Pathology Center, which would subsume responsibility for the AFIP Tissue Repository. A Joint Pathology Center Working Group Concept of Operations stated that:

The JPC ... will provide maintenance/modernization of the Tissue Repository in support of the mission of the DoD and other federal agencies.

In its review of the JPC Working Group Concept of Operations, the Defense Health Board emphasized that:

Every effort must be pursued to guarantee that the Tissue Repository is preserved, implements world-class modernization, and is utilized appropriately. A recent independent report by Asterand (Detroit, MI) submitted to Uniformed Services University of the Health Sciences found the repository to have a commercial value of $3.0-$3.6 Billion ...

Despite the utility of linking AFIP Tissue Repository specimens to longitudinal pre-diagnostic serum available in the DoDSR, no formal linkage of the AFIP Tissue Repository inventory has yet been made to DMSS or to the DoDSR. No estimate is yet available on the potential commercial value of such a formal linkage.

== Permitted Uses of DoDSR Specimens ==
Requests for access to DoDSR specimens are governed by guidelines developed by the Armed Forces Health Surveillance Center. According to guidelines, " [t]he Director of the repository is solely responsible for authorizing releases of specimens from the repository."

=== Research ===
DoDSR specimens may only be released to principal investigators outside the Department of Defense for purposes of medical research if the proposed study has "a coinvestigator who is assigned to the Department of Defense and is knowledgeable, responsible, and accountable for all aspects of the study's design and execution (including data management, analysis, interpretation, and reporting of results)."

=== Clinical Care ===
Serum from the DoDSR may be requested by clinicians within the Military Health System to aid diagnosis and guide clinical management. Serum may also be released to clinicians outside the Military Health System provided a physician in the Military Health System in the same specialty as the requestor validates the clinical relevance of the requested use prior to the release of any serum.

=== Criminal Investigations ===
Serum specimens from the DoDSR may be used for criminal investigations and prosecutions if directed by the Assistant Secretary of Defense for Health Affairs.

== Other Issues ==
=== Informed Consent ===
DoDSR specimens are collected without informed consent, and specimen donors are not informed of the use of their specimens in subsequent studies. Specimens retrieved by the DoDSR for use in external research studies are, with rare exceptions, deidentified prior to being sent to outside investigators.

=== Genetic Testing ===
A 1996 memorandum specifically stated that DoDSR specimens collected for pre- and post-deployment health surveillance "will not be used for any genetics related testing".

=== Civilian and Beneficiary Serum ===
As a result of clinically indicated HIV testing performed on civilians and family beneficiaries at Military Treatment Facilities (eligible for health care within the Military Health System), approximately 900,000 serum specimens from individuals not directly affiliated with the Uniformed Services through application or service are also stored in the DoDSR. In Privacy Act documentation, DoD acknowledges that the AFHSC maintains "... specimen collections (remaining serum from blood samples) from which serologic tests can be performed ..." from categories of individuals which include "Department of Defense military personnel (active and reserve) and their family members ...".

=== Destruction of Specimens ===
DoDSR guidelines are silent as to whether a mechanism exists for specimen donors to request destruction or removal of their specimens from the repository. In Privacy Act documentation, DoD states that "[r]ecords are destroyed when no longer needed for reference and for conducting business", but no formal mechanism is articulated for the destruction or specimens. This is in contrast to the Armed Forces Institute of Pathology DNA Repository (also known as the Repository of Specimen Samples for the Identification of Remains) which articulates a mechanism for donors to request the destruction of their specimens following separation from service.

=== RAND Study on the Role of the DoDSR in Pandemic Influenza Preparedness ===
On May 1, 2009, during the early stages of the 2009 H1N1 flu outbreak, an unpublished RAND study, originally commissioned in 2006 by USACHPPM was published in its entirety on WikiLeaks. The leaked documents included a justification for the $500,000 contract cost, directly authorized by former Surgeon General of the United States Army Kevin C. Kiley on August 4, 2006, which stated the study and its 12-month timetable for delivery was necessary

... to describe the current and future capabilities of the Department of Defense Serum Repository to assist with the early identification and response to an influenza pandemic. Adequate resources are not available in-house to perform these analyses in sufficient time to prepare for a pandemic ...

Despite the leaked study draft's publication date of May 2008, at the time of the leak and outbreak in May 2009, RAND listed the study as a "current project", noting in its description that "the threat of an emerging human pandemic [has] highlighted the importance of a comprehensive U.S. Armed Forces health surveillance architecture". Around the time of the leaked documents' appearance on WikiLeaks, the lead author of the unpublished RAND study published an op-ed piece in The Baltimore Sun describing the control of the outbreak a concern of "national security", and highlighting the need to "marshal the best ... institutional strengths ... to prevent, detect and respond effectively to this latest infectious disease".
