= Human Genetics Commission =

British advisory body

The Human Genetics Commission (HGC) was an advisory non-departmental public body that advised the UK government on the ethical and social aspects of genetics. This included genetic testing, cloning and other aspects of molecular medicine. The Commission was created after a review of the UK government biotechnology advisory framework in 1999. It was chaired initially by the lawyer, Baroness Helena Kennedy QC and, from 2007 to 2009, the acting chair was Sir John Sulston. From 2009, the Commission was chaired by Professor Jonathan Montgomery and comprised 21 members whose backgrounds include the law, medicine, consumer affairs, philosophy and ethics, scientific research, and clinical practice. Representatives of the Chief Medical Officers of England, Scotland, Wales, and Northern Ireland also sat on the Commission.

The Commission was abolished when quangos were reviewed by the newly elected government in October 2010. The Commission published its final paper in May 2012.
