= Forensic Science Service =

Former UK government body

Forensic Science Service Ltd
- Abbreviation: FSS
- Formation: December 2005 (former executive agency established in 1991)
- Dissolved: March 2012
- Legal status: Government-owned company
- Purpose: Integrated forensic science for English and Welsh criminal investigations
- Location: Trident Court, Birmingham Business Park, Marston Green, B37 7YN
- Region served: England and Wales
- Members: Forensic scientists
- Chief Executive: Dr Simon Bennett
- Main organ: FSS Board
- Parent organization: Home Office
- Affiliations: HM Revenue and Customs, Crown Prosecution Service, HM Coroners, Ministry of Defence Police and British Transport Police
- Website: FSS

The Forensic Science Service (FSS) was a government-owned company in the United Kingdom which provided forensic science services to the police forces and government agencies of England and Wales, as well as other countries.

The UK Government announced the closure of the FSS in December 2010, citing monthly losses of up to £2m as justification. The House of Commons Science and Technology Committee - Seventh Report (FSS) took evidence between 23 March 2011 and 27 April 2011 Science and Technology Committee. The FSS finally closed on 31 March 2012. The FSS archives – a collection of case files and retained casework samples such as microscope slides, fibre samples and DNA samples – has been retained to allow review of old cases. Forensic work is now contracted out to the private sector or carried out in-house.

== History ==
Originally the Aldermaston laboratory was known as the Central Research and Support Establishment and was part of the Home Office. As well as having a Forensic Laboratory it had research facilities where the Lion intoximeter was pioneered later leading to the pioneering use of the hand held breath alcohol roadside tester and the DNA national database was first worked on and initially tested on all staff and police forces to ensure its reliability. The organisation later pioneered the use of large scale DNA profiling for forensic identification and crime detection when it moved the facilities to Birmingham. This later enabled the launch of the world's first DNA database on 10 April 1995.

The organisation became an executive agency of the Home Office on 1 April 1991, shortly after deciding to close its Aldermaston Laboratory. It became a trading fund on 1 April 1999. In December 2005, it changed its status from an executive agency to a government-owned company. It was the Home Office's only government-owned company, although shareholder responsibilities were delegated to the Shareholder Executive.

Increasing use of competitive tendering by police forces for forensic services resulted in the loss of market share. Earlier in 2009, the government injected £50 million into the business.

On 22 October 2009, the FSS confirmed plans to close a further three regional labs in Chepstow, Chorley and Priory House, Birmingham, "to ensure provision of a sustainable business".

On 14 December 2010 HM Government announced that the service was to be closed by March 2012, with as much of its operations as possible being transferred or sold. This prompted criticism, both from international forensic scientists as well as victim campaigners, for the potential damage the cuts would do to the UK criminal justice system.

== Structure ==
The FSS had several facilities throughout the country, and provided scene-of-crime and forensic investigation services to police forces in England and Wales, as well as to the Crown Prosecution Service, HM Revenue and Customs, HM Coroners' Service, Ministry of Defence Police, British Transport Police and worldwide forensic services.

When an executive agency, its two main headquarters were at 109 Lambeth Road (A3202), London and at Priory House on Gooch Street North in Birmingham.

Its headquarters were close to the A452, near to where it crosses the M42. The Police in England and Wales spend £170 million on forensic science.

=== Laboratories ===
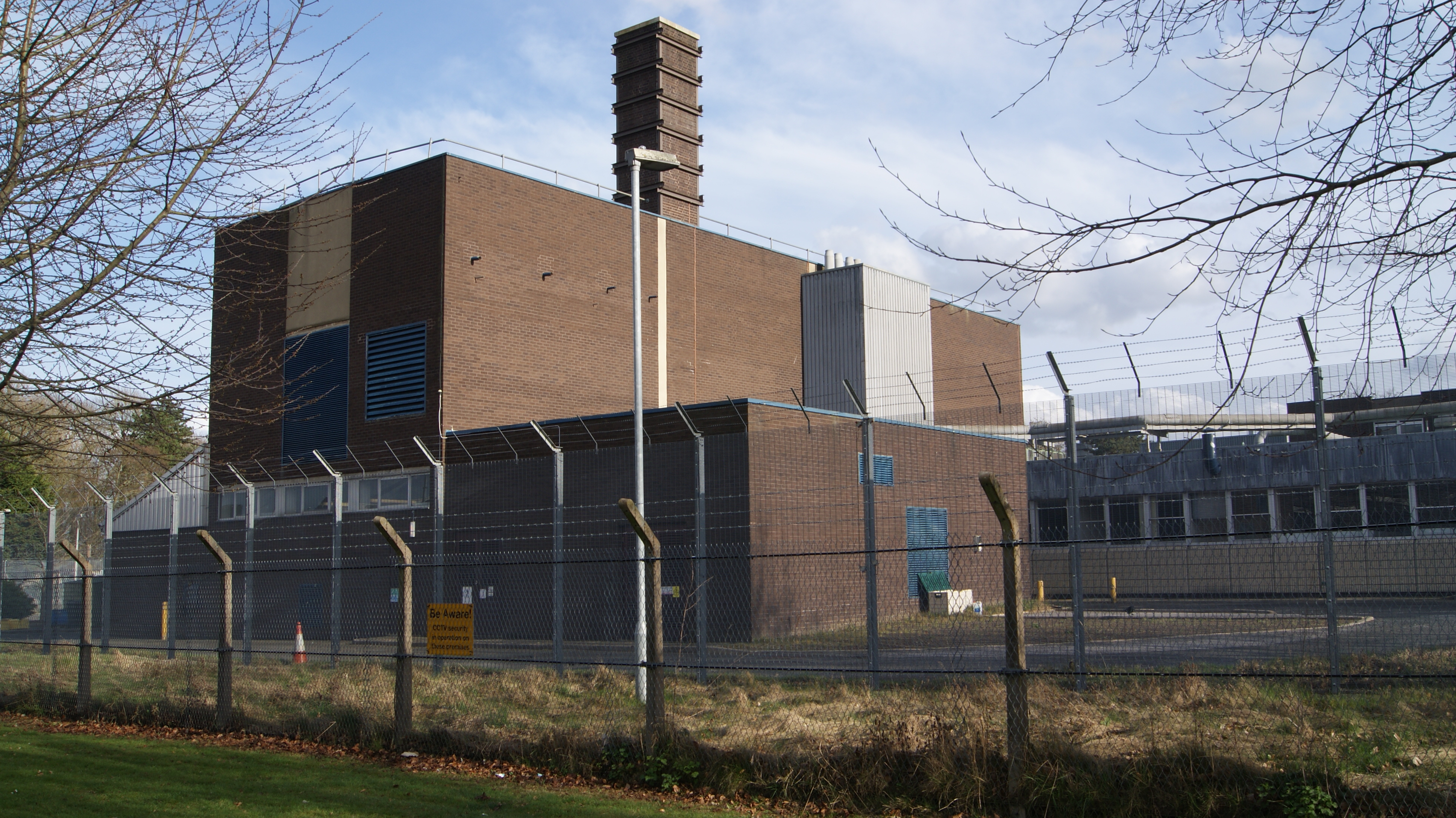
The FSS lab in Wetherby, West Yorkshire.

It had seven main laboratories across England and Wales:

- Trident Court, nr Solihull / Birmingham
- Priory House Birmingham
- Hinchingbrooke Park, Huntingdon
- London (Lambeth) after becoming an executive agency as until then it had been the Met Lab.
- Audby Lane, Wetherby, Leeds
- Usk Road, Chepstow
- Washington Hall, Chorley
- Aldermaston Laboratory, Aldermaston

== Function ==
Before HM Government wind-up led by minister James Brokenshire, the FSS was the market leader in the supply of forensic science services to police forces in England and Wales, as well as being a source of training, consultancy and scientific support. The FSS originally set up and maintained the UK National DNA Database, but it is now run by the National Policing Improvement Agency (NPIA).

The FSS suffered damage to its reputation following the failure to recover blood stains from a shoe in the murder of Damilola Taylor. Further damage occurred when the FSS failed to use the most up-to-date techniques for extracting DNA samples in cases between 2000 and 2005. This led the Association of Chief Police Officers (ACPO) to advise all police forces in England and Wales to review cases where samples had failed to give a DNA profile.

=== Technologies ===
The FSS's innovative and highly sensitive DNA profiling technique called LCN (low copy number) was used in convicting Antoni Imiela (the M25 rapist) and Ronald Castree (for the murder of Lesley Molseed in 1975), but was questioned during the 2007 trial of a suspect in the Omagh bombing. However, a review by the CPS found that "the CPS has not seen anything to suggest that any current problems exist with LCN. Accordingly we conclude that LCN DNA analysis provided by the FSS should remain available as potentially admissible evidence". In addition, other Police Forces around the world are reviewing cases where LCN DNA profiling resulted in the successful prosecution of suspects. Included in this are several high-profile international cases including the murder of Swedish Foreign Minister Anna Lindh by Mijailo Mijailovic and in Australia, the murder of a backpacker Peter Falconio by Bradley John Murdoch and trial of Bradley Robert Edwards for the Claremont serial killings.

In later years the FSS drew on internal expertise and key international experts to become a pioneer in forensic software and technology, notably DNA interpretation, databasing, and electronic forensics.
