= DNA Identification Act (Canada) =

Parliament of Canada
- Long title: An Act respecting DNA identification and to make consequential amendments to the Criminal Code and other Acts
- Citation: S.C. 1998, c. 37
- Royal assent: 10 December 1998

The DNA Identification Act (French: Loi sur l’identification par les empreintes génétiques) is a Canadian law that calls for the establishment of a DNA databank and allows judges to order DNA testing for criminal suspects. The Act received Royal Assent on 10 December 1998. The Act was confirmed in the 2006 R. v. Rodgers Supreme Court case.
