= James A. Lindsay =

American author (born 1979)

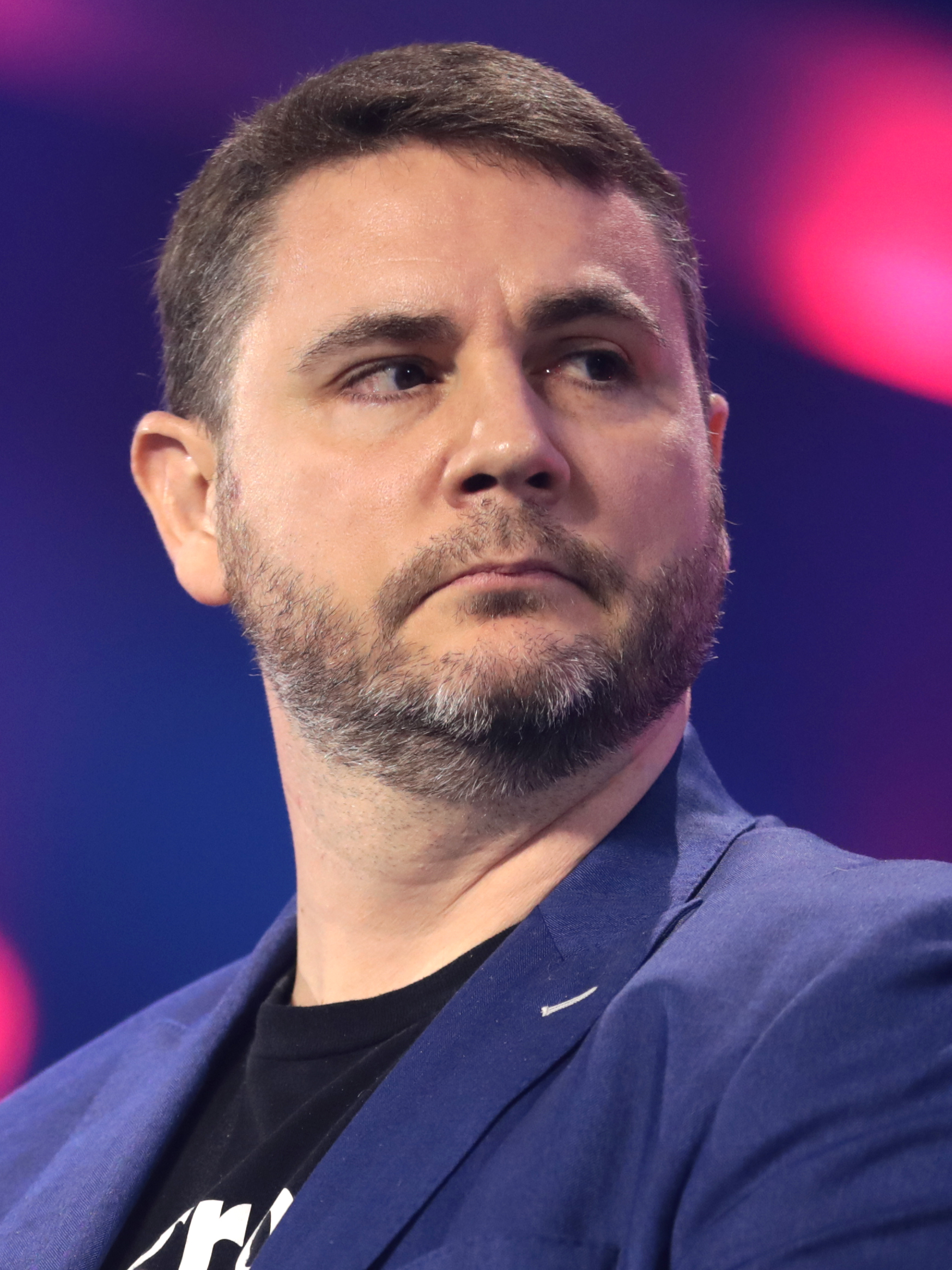
- Lindsay at Turning Point USA's 2022 AmericaFest conference
- Born: James Stephen Lindsay; June 8, 1979 (age 47); Ogdensburg, New York, U.S.
- Years active: 2017–present
- Known for: Grievance studies affair

Academic background
- Education: Tennessee Technological University (BS, MS); University of Tennessee (PhD)
- Thesis: Combinatorial Unification of Binomial-Like Arrays (2010)

Academic work
- School or tradition: Conservatism, New Atheism
- Main interests: Criticism of religion, postmodernism, critical race theory
- Notable works: Cynical Theories (2020)

James Stephen Lindsay (born June 8, 1979), known professionally as James A. Lindsay, or Conceptual James, is an American author and mathematician. In 2017 and 2018 he, Peter Boghossian, and Helen Pluckrose submitted hoax articles to academic journals in order to test scholarship and rigor in several academic fields, an act which became known as the grievance studies affair.

Lindsay has written several books including Cynical Theories (2020), which he co-authored with Pluckrose. He has promoted right-wing conspiracy theories such as Cultural Marxism, White genocide, and LGBT grooming.

== Early life and career ==
James Stephen Lindsay was born in Ogdensburg, New York. He moved to Maryville, Tennessee, at the age of five, later graduating from Maryville High School in 1997. Lindsay received a B.S. in physics and a M.S. in mathematics at Tennessee Tech, and a Ph.D. in mathematics in 2010 at the University of Tennessee, Knoxville. His doctoral thesis is titled "Combinatorial Unification of Binomial-Like Arrays", and his advisor was Carl G. Wagner. After completing his degree, Lindsay left academia and returned to his hometown, where he worked as a massage therapist.

Lindsay, along with Peter Boghossian, is the co-author of How to Have Impossible Conversations: A Very Practical Guide, a nonfiction book released in 2019 and published by Lifelong Books. In 2020, Lindsay released the nonfiction book Cynical Theories, co-authored with Helen Pluckrose and published by Pitchstone Publishing. The book became a Wall Street Journal, USA Today, and Publishers Weekly bestseller upon release. Harvard University psychologist Steven Pinker praised the book for exposing "the surprisingly shallow intellectual roots of the movements that appear to be engulfing our culture". Tim Smith-Laing charged it with "leaping from history to hysteria" in a Daily Telegraph review.

Lindsay is the founder of the website New Discourses, which is owned by conservative commentator Michael O'Fallon. Lindsay's video series is also hosted by Sovereign Nations, O'Fallon's Christian nationalist website. According to theologian and author David W. Congdon, "framing the left as an alternative religion has made Lindsay popular among the Christian Right". As of March 2019, Lindsay appeared four times on Joe Rogan's podcast The Joe Rogan Experience. In August 2022, Lindsay was permanently suspended from Twitter. His account was reinstated in November 2022 after Elon Musk's acquisition of Twitter.

== Grievance studies affair ==
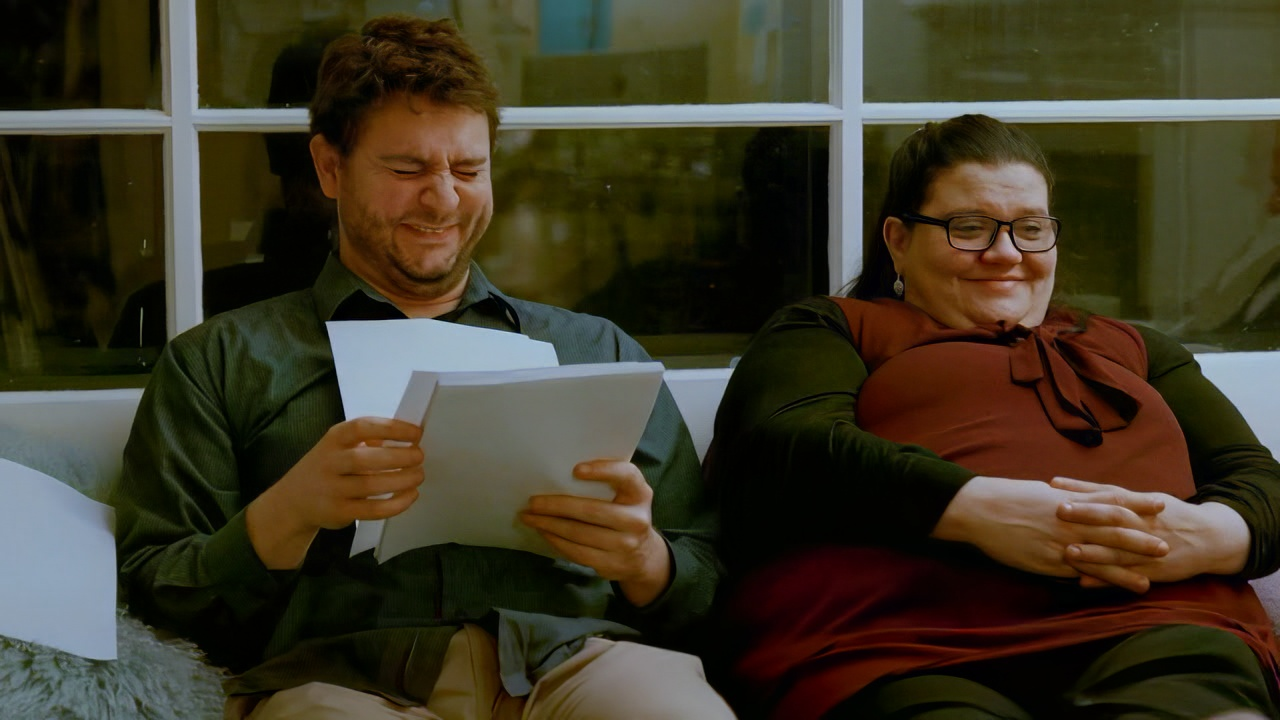
Lindsay and Pluckrose laughing at their grievance studies papers, in 2018

In 2017, Lindsay and Boghossian published a hoax paper titled "The Conceptual Penis as a Social Construct". In writing the paper, Lindsay and Boghossian intended to imitate the style of "poststructuralist discursive gender theory". The paper argued that the penis should be seen "not as an anatomical organ but as a social construct isomorphic to performative toxic masculinity". After the paper was rejected by Norma, they later submitted it to Cogent Social Sciences where it was accepted for publication.

Beginning in August 2017, Lindsay, Boghossian, and Pluckrose wrote 20 additional 'woke' hoax papers, which they submitted to peer-reviewed journals using several pseudonyms as well as the name of Richard Baldwin, a friend of Boghossian and professor emeritus of history at Florida's Gulf Coast State College. The project ended early after one of the papers, published in the feminist geography journal Gender, Place & Culture, was questioned by investigative journalist Toni Airaksinen of Campus Reform who suspected the article was not real due to its lack of adherence to academic journal publishing standards. This resulted in widespread interest in the incident, which was written about by several journalists.

The trio subsequently revealed the full scope of their work in a YouTube video created and released by documentary filmmaker Mike Nayna, which was accompanied by an investigation by The Wall Street Journal. By the time of this revelation, seven of their twenty papers had been accepted, seven were still under review, and six had been rejected. One paper, accepted by feminist social work journal Affilia, contained passages copied from Adolf Hitler's Mein Kampf with feminist language added, though sociologist Mikko Lagerspetz has contended that the paper only contained similarities in structure, and did not contain material "historically specific in Hitler's text (racism, references to the First World War, and so on)". Academic reviewers had praised the hoax studies of Lindsay, Boghossian, and Pluckrose as "a rich and exciting contribution to the study of ... the intersection between masculinity and anality", "excellent and very timely", and "important dialogue for social workers and feminist scholars".

== Views ==
Prior to 2020, Lindsay supported Democratic Party candidates, including volunteering for Barack Obama, and was part of the New Atheism movement. In 2023, Lindsay published an article on New Discourses in which he set out to defend the philosophical basis of classical liberalism, which he summarized as "the project of organizing our society from a position of political equality with certain rights that are inalienable, among these life, liberty, property, capacity for their use toward our happiness and purposes, and a reasonable expectation of privacy in which we can maintain their sanctity".

Lindsay is a critic of "wokeness", which he analogizes to religious belief. He describes "the Social Justice Movement" as his "ideological enemy". Though he opposed Donald Trump in the 2016 United States presidential election, Lindsay announced his intention to vote for Trump in the 2020 election, arguing that the danger of "wokeness" is much greater than that of a Trump presidency. In 2024, he voted again for Donald Trump.

Lindsay has clashed with other right-wing figures, who he refers to as the "woke right". Southern Baptist Theological Seminary president Albert Mohler looked to Lindsay to understand critical race theory because, in Mohler's words, few have "given sustained attention to critical theory from a conservative viewpoint".

=== Cynical Theories (2020) ===
Cynical Theories contrasts the academic approaches of liberalism and postmodernism, then argues that "applied postmodernism" (which focuses on ought rather than is) has displaced other approaches to activism and scholarship. The authors present several academic fields and schools—postcolonial theory, queer theory, critical race theory, intersectionality, fourth-wave feminism, gender studies, fat studies, and ableism—and describe how the "applied postmodernism" approach has developed in each field. The authors use capitalization to distinguish between the liberal concept of "social justice" and the ideological movement of "Social Justice" that they state has reified postmodernism.

=== Conspiracy theory promotion ===
Lindsay has promoted several conspiracy theories. He is a proponent of the LGBT grooming conspiracy theory and has been credited as one of several public figures responsible for popularizing "groomer" as a slur directed at LGBTQ educators and activists by members of the political right. Lindsay has referred to the Pride flag as "the flag of a hostile enemy".

In 2021, Lindsay wrote on Twitter that "there will be" a genocide of whites if critical race theory "isn't stopped." His statement was met with widespread criticism, including from founder of libertarian anti-identity politics magazine Quillette Claire Lehmann who wrote: "James Lindsay is now peddling White Genocide Theory. Implying that a genocide against whites in the U.S. is imminent has the potential to inspire racist violence. Such comments are extreme, reckless, and irresponsible. They should be denounced." Lindsay has also promoted the far-right Cultural Marxism conspiracy theory, which alleges a concerted effort by Marxist critical theorists to undermine Western civilization using Marxism.

== Works ==
- God Doesn't; We Do: Only Humans Can Solve Human Challenges (ISBN 978-1-4750-6397-4). 2012.
- Dot, Dot, Dot: Infinity Plus God Equals Folly (ISBN 978-0-9566948-9-8). Onus Books. 2013.
- Everybody Is Wrong About God (ISBN 978-1-63431-038-3). Pitchstone Publishing. 2015.
- Life in Light of Death (ISBN 978-1-63431-086-4). Pitchstone Publishing. 2016.
- How to Have Impossible Conversations: A Very Practical Guide (with Peter Boghossian; ISBN 978-0738285337). Hachette Books. 2019.
- Cynical Theories (with Helen Pluckrose; ISBN 978-1-63431-203-5). Pitchstone Publishing. 2020.
- Counter Wokecraft (with Charles Pincourt; ISBN 979-8-5368-1503-8). Independently published. 2021.
- Race Marxism: The Truth About Critical Race Theory and Praxis (ISBN 979-8-7958-0908-3). Independently published. 2022.
- The Queering of the American Child: How a New School Religious Cult Poisons the Minds and Bodies of Normal Kids (with Logan Lancing) (ISBN 979-8-9897-4169-4). New Discourses. 2024.
