= Peter Boghossian =

American philosopher and pedagogist (born 1966)

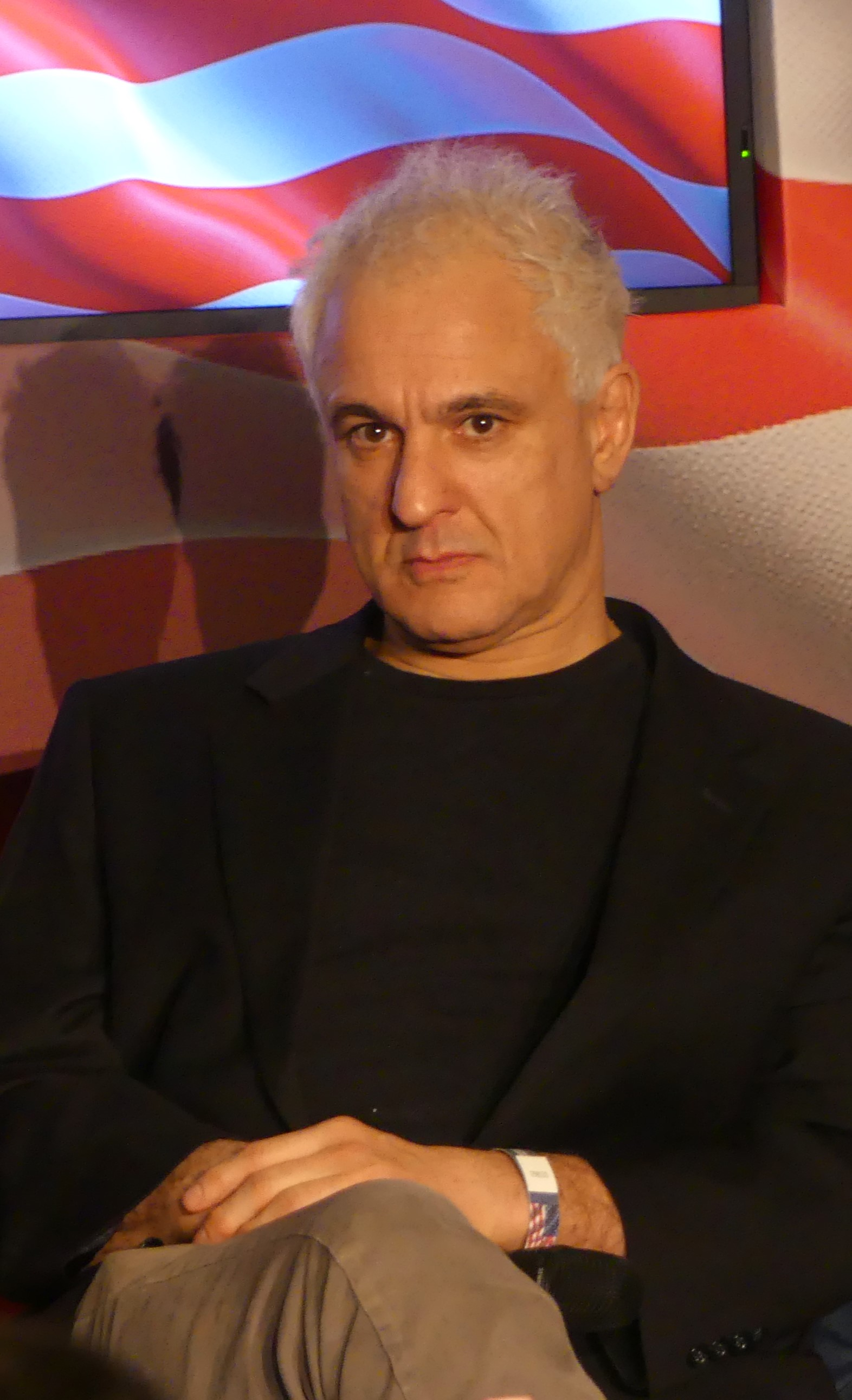
- Boghossian in 2024
- Born: Peter Gregory Boghossian; July 25, 1966 (age 60); Boston, Massachusetts, U.S.

Education
- Education: Marquette University (BA); Fordham University (MA); Portland State University (EdD)

Philosophical work
- School: New Atheism
- Institutions: Portland State University
- Main interests: Atheism, critical thinking, pedagogy, scientific skepticism, Socratic method
- Notable ideas: Socratic pedagogy, street epistemology
- Website: peterboghossian.com

Peter Gregory Boghossian (/bəˈɡoʊʒən/; born July 25, 1966) is an American philosopher and college professor. He was an assistant professor of philosophy at Portland State University for ten years, and his areas of academic focus include atheism, critical thinking, pedagogy, scientific skepticism, and the Socratic method. He is the author of A Manual for Creating Atheists, and (with James A. Lindsay) of How to Have Impossible Conversations: A Very Practical Guide.

Boghossian was involved in the grievance studies affair (also called "Sokal Squared" in media coverage) with collaborators James A. Lindsay and Helen Pluckrose, which entailed submitting bogus papers to academic journals related to gender studies and other fields in order to test peer-reviews. This project generated significant media and academic attention, including both praise and condemnation, as well as ethical and methodological criticism. After an investigation, Portland State University restricted Boghossian's future work on the basis of research misconduct. In September 2021, Boghossian resigned his position from Portland State University, citing harassment and a lack of intellectual freedom.

Boghossian coined the term street epistemology for a set of conversational techniques he described, which are designed to enable examination of strongly held beliefs, especially of the religious kind, in a non-confrontational manner.

== Early life ==
Boghossian was born and raised in Boston, Massachusetts. He is of Armenian descent; his paternal grandparents were Armenian immigrants.

== Career ==
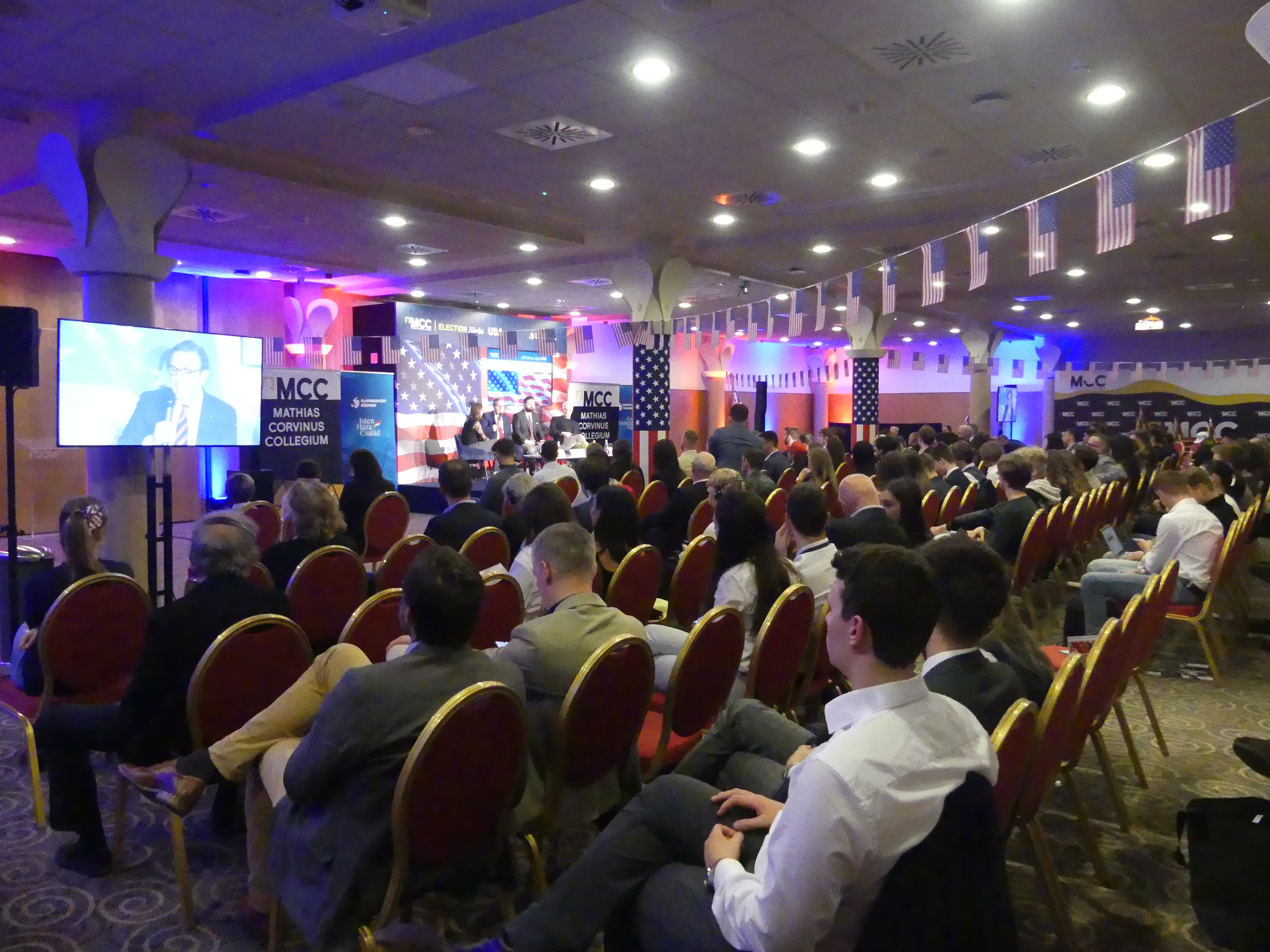
With Gladden Pappin and Miklós Szánthó in 2024

Boghossian received a Bachelor of Arts degree in psychology from Marquette University in 1988 and subsequently a Master of Arts degree in philosophy from Fordham University in 1992. In 2004, he obtained a Doctor of Education in educational leadership from Portland State University. His primary interests are critical thinking, philosophy of education, and moral reasoning. His thesis looked at the use of the Socratic method with prison inmates for critical thinking and moral reasoning with the intention of decreasing ongoing criminal behavior. The research was funded by the State of Oregon. Boghossian was Chairman of the Prison Advisory Committee for the Columbia River Correctional Institution. He is a fellow at the Center for Prison Reform. He was employed as an assistant professor at Portland State University, quitting in protest due to what he viewed as a culture of illiberalism.

Boghossian is the author of two books, A Manual for Creating Atheists (2013), a book with a foreword by Michael Shermer, and How to Have Impossible Conversations: A Very Practical Guide (2019). He also contributed a foreword to white supremacist commentator Stefan Molyneux's book Against the Gods. He has characterized his collaborations with Molyneux as being based only on his agreement on matters of metaphysics, and not with Molyneux's political views.

In 2017, Boghossian was featured in Reasons to Believe, a documentary focusing on psychology and the science of belief.

He has been a speaker for the Center for Inquiry, the Richard Dawkins Foundation for Reason and Science, and the Secular Student Alliance.

In September 2021, Boghossian resigned his position from Portland State University. In his resignation letter, he called the university a "Social Justice factory" and said that he faced harassment and retaliation for speaking out. The letter also accuses the university of creating a culture where students are "afraid to speak openly and honestly", of training students to "mimic the moral certainty of ideologues", and of "[driving] intolerance of divergent beliefs and opinions".

In November 2021, Boghossian was among the founders of the University of Austin, a school whose mission is "to create a 'fiercely independent' school that offers an alternative to what founders see as a rise in “illiberalism” on college campuses."

On February 17, 2022, he gave a conference on "wokism" at the Mathias Corvinus Collegium (MCC) in Budapest, Hungary.

== Views ==
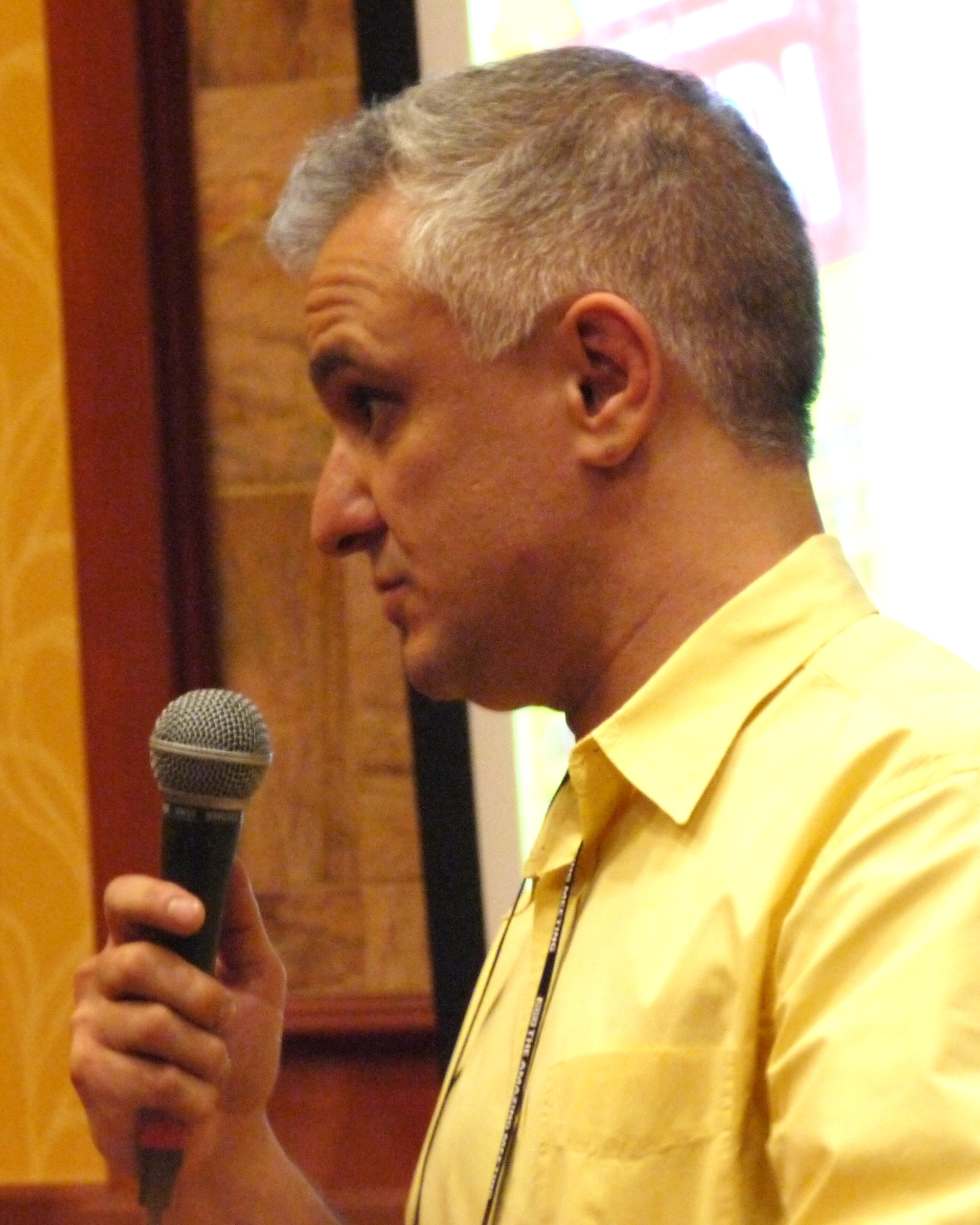
Boghossian at The Amazing Meeting in 2013

Boghossian has called all faith-based beliefs "delusions". He has been described by The Daily Beast as aligned with the New Atheist movement. He advocates using the Socratic method to dissuade religious believers, though he recommends focusing on criticism of faith as a way of knowing (he calls it an "unreliable epistemology"), rather than the outward trappings of religious communities.

In a 2015 interview with Dave Rubin, Boghossian described himself as a classical liberal who has never voted for a Republican candidate, but is "not a fan" of the Democrats. He stated that any of the Republican candidates for the 2016 presidential election "would be an unmitigated disaster". He donated to and endorsed Andrew Yang for the 2020 United States presidential election. He has stated that the US Republican Party is "the most powerful, anti-science political movement in the world". He wrote that it was "not alarmist" to state that they "could destroy the world" since many "refuse to even acknowledge that climate change is happening", and stated that their "denialist attitude is due partly to the religious convictions".

According to Boghossian, "the regressive left have taken over academia". He has often stated that cultural relativism and egalitarianism are contradictory values.

== Grievance studies affair ==
In the grievance studies affair, also referred to as the "Sokal Squared" scandal, Boghossian, James A. Lindsay and Helen Pluckrose submitted a series of hoax academic papers for peer-review to journals in academic fields which they termed "grievance studies"—race, gender, feminist and sexuality studies which they believed were characterized by low scientific standards. They prepared 20 papers, of which 7 were accepted by the time the Wall Street Journal called their bluff.

=== Previous hoax paper ===
In 2017, Boghossian and Lindsay published a hoax paper titled "The Conceptual Penis as a Social Construct". The paper, which the authors said was intentionally absurd and written in a way that imitated the style of "poststructuralist discursive gender theory", argued that the penis should be seen "not as an anatomical organ but as a social construct isomorphic to performative toxic masculinity". Boghossian and Lindsay initially submitted the paper to Norma, where it was rejected. They later submitted the paper to Cogent Social Sciences, a Taylor & Francis open access journal which has been criticized as a pay-to-publish operation. The authors later revealed the hoax in Skeptic magazine. Boghossian and Lindsay stated that they intended to demonstrate that "gender studies is crippled academically by an overriding almost-religious belief that maleness is the root of all evil", and also to highlight problems with the review processes of open-access journals.

A number of critics questioned whether Boghossian and Lindsay's paper demonstrated a problem in the field of gender studies. Alan Sokal, a mathematics professor who was responsible for a similar hoax in 1996, noted that Cogent Social Sciences was a low-tiered open access journal that did not specialize in gender studies, and said that it seemed unlikely the paper would have been accepted at a mainstream gender studies journal. While the journal did conduct a postmortem, Boghossian and Lindsay concluded the "impact [of the hoax] was very limited, and much criticism of it was legitimate".

=== Sequence of events ===
Beginning in August 2017, Boghossian, Lindsay, and Pluckrose began a much larger attempt in which they wrote 20 hoax papers, submitting them to peer-reviewed journals under a variety of pseudonyms as well as the name of Richard Baldwin, a professor emeritus at Florida's Gulf Coast State College and friend of Boghossian. The project was halted early after one of the papers in the feminist geography journal Gender, Place & Culture was criticized on social media, and then its authenticity questioned on Campus Reform.

After this, the trio revealed the full extent of their work in a YouTube video created and released by documentary filmmaker Mike Nayna, alongside an investigation by The Wall Street Journal. By the time of the revelation seven of their twenty papers had been accepted, seven were still under review, and six had been rejected. One paper, which was accepted by feminist social work journal Affilia, transposed up-to-date jargon into passages lifted from Adolf Hitler's Mein Kampf.

Tom Whipple of The Times wrote that academic reviewers had praised the studies prior to the revelation of the hoax as "a rich and exciting contribution to the study of ... the intersection between masculinity and anality", "excellent and very timely", and "important dialogue for social workers and feminist scholars".

=== Reactions ===
The project drew both praise and criticism, with author Yascha Mounk dubbing it 'Sokal squared' in reference to the Sokal Affair hoax perpetrated by Alan Sokal and saying "The result is hilarious and delightful. It also showcases a serious problem with big parts of academia." Harvard psychologist Steven Pinker said the project posed the question "is there any idea so outlandish that it won't be published in a Critical/PoMo/Identity/'Theory' journal?" Daniel Engber of online magazine Slate criticised the project, saying "one could have run this sting on almost any empirical discipline and returned the same result". In an open but anonymous letter, eleven of Boghossian's colleagues at Portland State University wrote that the hoaxes "violat[ed] acceptable norms of research", and were "fraudulent, time-wasting, anti-intellectual activities". Joel P. Christensen and Matthew A. Sears said it was "the academic equivalent of the fraudulent hit pieces on Planned Parenthood" produced in 2015. Carl Bergstrom claimed "the hoaxers appear woefully naïve about how the [peer review] system actually works".

A 2021 study assessing the grievance studies affair concluded, (1) journals with higher impact factors were more likely to reject papers submitted as part of the project; (2) the chances were better, if the manuscript was allegedly based on empirical data; (3) peer reviews can be an important asset in the process of revising a manuscript; and (4) when the project authors, with academic education from neighboring disciplines, closely followed the reviewers' advice, they were able to learn relatively quickly what is needed for writing an acceptable article. The boundary between a seriously written paper and a "hoax" gradually became blurred. Finally (5), the way the project ended showed that in the long run, the scientific community will uncover fraudulent practices."

=== Research misconduct investigation ===
In 2018, Boghossian's employer, Portland State University, initiated a research misconduct inquiry relating to the grievance studies affair. According to the Chronicle of Higher Education, the university's institutional review board (IRB) concluded in December that Boghossian violated the ethical guidelines by conducting research on human subjects without approval. Consequently, he was banned from doing research until he had "completed training and could demonstrate that he understood how to protect the rights of human subjects". The University also said it was "considering a further charge that he had falsified data".

After news of the research conduct investigation broke, a number of prominent academics wrote letters defending Boghossian, including evolutionary biologist Richard Dawkins, Harvard psychologist Steven Pinker, mathematician and physicist Alan Sokal, philosopher Daniel Dennett, social psychologist Jonathan Haidt, and psychologist Jordan Peterson. Pinker wrote that Portland State University's investigation struck him and his colleagues "as an attempt to weaponize an important [principle] of academic ethics in order to punish a scholar for expressing an unpopular opinion". Dawkins suggested that the investigation could be politically motivated: "If the members of your committee of inquiry object to the very idea of satire as a form of creative expression, they should come out honestly and say so. But to pretend that this is a matter of publishing false data is so obviously ridiculous that one cannot help suspecting an ulterior motive." Peterson said that those pursuing allegations against Boghossian, and not Boghossian himself, were guilty of academic misconduct.

On the other hand, IRB experts interviewed by Jesse Singal for New York magazine agreed that Boghossian should have sought IRB approval for the study.

== Street epistemology ==
Street epistemology (often abbreviated to SE) is a term coined by Boghossian in his book A Manual for Creating Atheists. This is a set of non-confrontational conversational techniques for discussing a strongly-held belief, designed to promote thoughtful reflection and open-mindedness in a participant regarding the belief. Boghossian outlined the method and its application in helping religious believers to reflect on the reliability of faith as an epistemology. However, it has also been found effective in many other contexts, and Boghossian later co-authored with James Lindsay How to Have Impossible Conversations, which describes the application of street epistemology to an examination of a wider range of beliefs including nonreligious ones.

== Bibliography ==
=== Thesis ===
- Socratic pedagogy, critical thinking, moral reasoning and inmate education: an exploratory study (Ed.D. thesis). Portland State University. 2004. OCLC 57569353.

=== Books ===
- Boghossian, Peter (2013). A Manual for Creating Atheists. Pitchstone Publishing. ISBN 978-1939578099.
- Boghossian, Peter; Lindsay, James (2019). How to Have Impossible Conversations: A Very Practical Guide. Da Capo Lifelong Books. ISBN 978-0738285320.
