= Grievance studies affair =

Group of bogus academic papers (2018)

- Lindsay and Pluckrose in a video about their hoax
- Duration: 2017–2018
- Type: Hoax; the publication of bogus academic papers
- Motive: Expose poor science in categories of gender, feminist, race, sexuality, fat, queer, cultural studies and sociology
- Target: Academic journals within some specific subfields, including cultural studies and gender studies
- First reporter: Jillian Kay Melchior of The Wall Street Journal (October 2, 2018); Mike Nayna
- Organised by: James A. Lindsay; Peter Boghossian; Helen Pluckrose
- Filmed by: Mike Nayna
- Outcome: Out of 20 papers submitted, 4 published, 3 accepted but not yet published, 6 rejected, 7 still under review (at the time when the hoax was revealed, and halted)

The grievance studies affair was the project of a team of three authors—Peter Boghossian, James A. Lindsay, and Helen Pluckrose—to highlight what they saw as poor scholarship and erosion of standards in several academic fields. Taking place over 2017 and 2018, their project entailed submitting bogus papers to academic journals on topics from the field of critical social theory such as cultural, queer, race, gender, fat, and sexuality studies to determine whether they would pass through peer review and be accepted for publication. Four of the twenty papers they submitted were published, which the authors interpreted as supporting their position. Although editors at an accepting journal later stated that their acceptance criteria had been affected by the use of falsified data sets in the hoax papers.

The affair echoed Alan Sokal's 1996 hoax in Social Text, a cultural studies journal, which inspired Boghossian, Lindsay, and Pluckrose.

The trio set out with the intent to expose problems in what they called "grievance studies", referring to academic areas where they claim "a culture has developed in which only certain conclusions are allowed [...] and put social grievances ahead of objective truth". Identifying themselves as political liberals, the trio described their project as an attempt to raise awareness of what they believed was the damage that postmodernism and identity politics–based scholarship was having on liberal political projects as well as on science and academia more broadly.

Boghossian, Lindsay, and Pluckrose wrote 20 articles that promoted deliberately absurd ideas or morally questionable acts and submitted them to various peer-reviewed journals. Although they had planned for the project to run until January 2019, the trio admitted to the hoax in October 2018 after journalists from The Wall Street Journal revealed that "Helen Wilson", the pseudonym used for their article published in Gender, Place & Culture, did not exist. By the time of the revelation, 4 of their 20 papers had been published; 3 had been accepted but not yet published; 6 had been rejected; and 7 were still under review. Included among the articles that were published were arguments that dogs engage in rape culture and that men could reduce their transphobia by anally penetrating themselves with sex toys, as well as a part of a chapter of Adolf Hitler's Mein Kampf rewritten using "up-to-date jargon".

The hoax received a polarized reception within academia. Some academics praised it for exposing flaws that they saw as widespread among sectors of the humanities and social sciences influenced by postmodernism, critical theory, and identity politics. Others criticised what they perceived as the unethical nature of submitting deliberately bogus research. Some critics also asserted that the work did not represent a scientific investigation, given that the project did not include a control group, further arguing that invalid arguments and poor standards of peer-review were not restricted to "grievance studies" subjects but found across much of academia.

== "Grievance studies" and "applied postmodernism" ==
Through their series of hoax articles, James A. Lindsay, Peter Boghossian, and Helen Pluckrose intended to expose issues in what they term as "grievance studies", a subcategory of academic areas where the three believe "a culture has developed in which only certain conclusions are allowed [...] and put social grievances ahead of objective truth".

== Sequence of events ==
=== Attempts ===
Prior to the affair, various academics highlighted concerns about the intellectual validity of much research influenced by postmodern philosophy and critical theory by publishing hoax articles in various journals. It was the 1996 hoax by Alan Sokal in Social Text, in particular, that influenced James A. Lindsay and Peter Boghossian to publish a hoax article of their own.

On May 19, 2017, peer-reviewed journal Cogent Social Sciences published "The conceptual penis as a social construct", which argued that penises are not "male"; rather, they should be analyzed as social constructs instead. The same day, Lindsay and Boghossian revealed it to be a hoax aimed at discrediting gender studies, although Cogent Social Sciences is not exclusively a gender-studies journal.

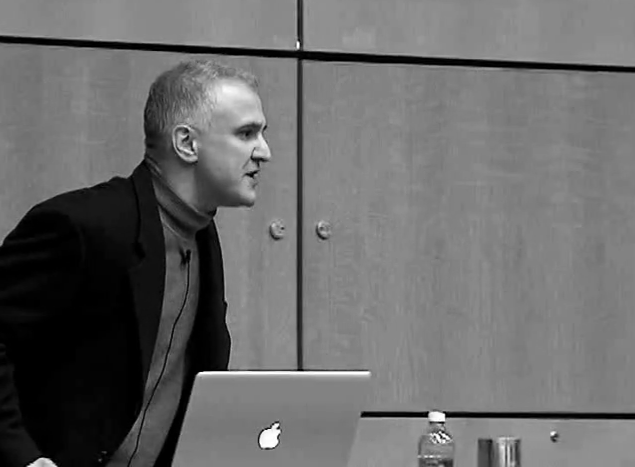
Peter Boghossian lecturing in 2012

The authorship of each paper was either fictional—such as "Helen Wilson" of "Portland Ungendering Research Initiative"—or borrowed the name of Richard Baldwin, professor emeritus of history at Gulf Coast State College. Respectful feedback was provided for some of the accepted papers.

=== Discovery of hoax ===
The journal Gender, Place & Culture published a note on August 6, 2018, stating that it suspected "Helen Wilson" had breached their contract to "not [fabricate] or [misappropriate] anyone's identity, including [their] own", adding that "the author has not responded to our request to provide appropriate documentation confirming their identity".

== Reactions ==
The authors' reaction to coverage of the affair in The New York Times, and further related discussion

The political scientist Yascha Mounk dubbed it "Sokal squared" in reference to the Sokal affair hoax accomplished by Alan Sokal, and said that the "result is hilarious and delightful. It also showcases a serious problem with big parts of academia." The psychologist Steven Pinker said the project posed the question "is there any idea so outlandish that it won't be published in a Critical/PoMo/Identity/'Theory' journal?" In contrast, Joel P. Christensen and Matthew A. Sears, both classicists, referred to it as "the academic equivalent of the fraudulent hit pieces on Planned Parenthood" produced in 2015, more interested in publicity than "valid argumentation or scholarship".

In The Atlantic, Mounk said that "Like just about everything else in this depressing national moment, Sokal Squared is already being used as ammunition in the great American culture war." He characterized two sets of responses to the affair as "intellectually dishonest": right-wing responses that used the affair to discredit wider academia and left-wing responses that treated it as a politically motivated attack on academia. He said the former overlooked that "There are many fields of academia that have absolutely no patience for nonsense", including the fact that all the papers submitted to sociology journals had been rejected, while the latter attacked the motives behind the hoax instead of refuting it.

=== Responses by the editors of the publishing journals ===
Ann Garry, a co-editor of Hypatia, which had accepted one of the hoax papers ("When the Joke's on You", which purported to be a feminist critique of hoaxes) but had not published it yet, said she was "deeply disappointed" by the hoax. Garry told The New York Times that "Referees put in a great deal of time and effort to write meaningful reviews, and the idea that individuals would submit fraudulent academic material violates many ethical and academic norms." Nicholas Mazza, editor of the Journal of Poetry Therapy, said: "Although a valuable point was learned regarding the authenticity of articles/authors [...] the authors of the 'study' clearly engaged in flawed and unethical research."

=== Praise ===
Yascha Mounk said that while the authors received no favors for preparing the hoax, they demonstrated mastery in postmodern jargon and not only ridiculed the journals in question, but, more importantly, outed double standards of gender studies which happily welcome hoaxes against "morally suspect" fields like economics, but are unable to accept a criticism of their own methods. He also commented on the "sheer amount of tribal solidarity it has elicited among leftists and academics" and the fact that many of the reactions were purely ad hominem, while few have actually said that there is an actual problem highlighted by the hoax: "some of the leading journals in areas like gender studies have failed to distinguish between real scholarship and intellectually vacuous as well as morally troubling bullshit". Rejecting complaints that the trio, lacking a control group, engaged in a "confused attempt to import statistics into a question where it doesn't apply", Mounk stated that the trio had promised "nothing of the sort" in the first place, and had instead successfully accomplished their goal of demonstrating that it was "possible" to "get bullshit published" in the journals in question.

Justin E. H. Smith defended hoaxing as an intellectual or scholarly practice, providing a series of examples of hoaxes ranging from the Italian Renaissance to the 2000s. In The Chronicle of Higher Education, Heather E. Heying wrote that the hoax helped to expose many pathologies of the modern social sciences, such as "repudiation of science and logic" and "extolling activism over inquiry".

Upon Boghossian's employer Portland State University initiating a research misconduct inquiry on the grounds of conducting human subject–based research without approval, and further considering a charge of fabricating data, Richard Dawkins and Steven Pinker submitted letters of support to him. Dawkins compared Boghossian to a novelist, pointing out that George Orwell's novel Animal Farm could be criticized for its many "falsehoods" regarding the capabilities of animals to speak English. He asked:

Do your humourless colleagues who brought this action want Portland State to become the laughing stock of the academic world? Or at least the world of serious scientific scholarship uncontaminated by pretentious charlatans of exactly the kind Dr Boghossian and his colleagues were satirising?

The psychologist Jonathan Haidt stated that the inquiry would be "a profound moral error—an injustice—that will be obvious to all who hear about your decision, and that will have bad effects upon the public perception of PSU and of universities in general", and concluded that Boghossian and his co-authors are whistleblowers, who undertook a "career-risking project to stand up for academic integrity by exposing what is, arguably, an academic subculture that tolerates intellectual fraud." Philosopher Daniel Dennett stated that Boghossian's targets "could learn a few things about academic integrity" from his "fine example", undertaken "in good faith". Alan Sokal and Jordan Peterson also supported Boghossian.

=== Criticism ===
On Slate, Daniel Engber wrote that the hoaxers' project "say[s] nothing whatsoever about the fields [the hoaxers] chose to target". Since "[w]e know from long experience that expert peer review offers close to no protection against outright data fraud", Engber asserted that "one could have run this sting on almost any empirical discipline and returned the same result" even if such disciplines' journals were peer-reviewed, echoing Tim Smith-Laing's The Daily Telegraph article. (Note: Tim Smith-Laing reviewed Cynical Theories in The Daily Telegraph, a conservative newspaper. Referring to the "rape culture in dog parks" paper, Smith-Laing stated that "science writer Tom Chivers, among others, noted, it is invidious to claim that there is a particular problem with humanities and social sciences journals in the midst of the ongoing replication crisis in scientific journals. Indeed, it is impossible to do so at all if your experiment does not compare the two [...] [I]t is not quite logical to assert that your hoax shows a widespread disregard for empirical proof when the papers published contained quantities of carefully fabricated empirical proof.")

Sarah Richardson, Harvard University professor of women's studies, criticized the hoaxers for not including a control group in their experiment, telling BuzzFeed News: "By their own standards, we can't scientifically conclude anything from it."

Evolutionary biologist Carl T. Bergstrom in The Chronicle of Higher Education wrote that "the hoaxers appear woefully naïve about how the system actually works", adding that peer review is not designed to remove fraud or even absurd ideas, and that replication will lead to self-correction. In the same article, David Schieber said he was one of the two anonymous reviewers for "Rubbing One Out", and argued that the hoaxers selectively quoted from his review. "They were turning my attempt to help the authors of a rejected paper into an indictment of my field and the journal I reviewed for, even though we rejected the paper."

An n+1 article alleged "blatant manipulation of its own 'data,' the lack of meaningful controls".

In UnHerd, Tom Chivers stated that while the so-called "grievance studies" fields "probably" contain more "bullshit [...] than most scientific fields", the hoax drew attention away from scholarly shoddiness across the entirety of academia, including the "whole of science, especially psychology and medicine". He highlighted that several weeks prior to the hoax's public revelation, professor of food behaviour Brian Wansink had resigned from his position at Cornell University following exposure of instances of scientific misconduct on his part.

Mikko Lagerspetz analyzed the project's experimental design and its possible results, based on the peer reviews and editorial decisions available through the project's website. He sums it up on the journal Science, Technology, and Human Values:

(1) journals with higher impact factors were more likely to reject papers submitted as part of the project; (2) the chances were better, if the manuscript was allegedly based on empirical data; (3) peer reviews can be an important asset in the process of revising a manuscript; and (4) when the project authors, with academic education from neighboring disciplines, closely followed the reviewers' advice, they were able to learn relatively quickly what is needed for writing an acceptable article. The boundary between a seriously written paper and a "hoax" gradually became blurred. Finally (5), the way the project ended showed that in the long run, the scientific community will uncover fraudulent practices.

Lagerspetz concludes that the experiment was flawed both experimentally and ethically, and failed to provide the evidence it sought. It is unclear, on what grounds the project group decided what journals to target. One third (7) of the 21 final editorial decisions the authors received were positive, two thirds of the decisions were negative. In the absence of a control group, it is impossible to tell whether this proportion would have been lower or higher within other disciplines.

== List of hoax papers ==
=== Accepted ===
==== Published ====
- Helen Wilson (pseudonym) (2018). "Human Reactions to Rape Culture and Queer Performativity at Urban Dog Parks in Portland, Oregon". Gender, Place & Culture: 1–20. doi:10.1080/0966369X.2018.1475346. (Retracted, see doi:10.1080/0966369X.2018.1513216)
- Richard Baldwin (borrowed identity) (2018). "Who Are They to Judge? Overcoming Anthropometry and a Framework for Fat Bodybuilding". Fat Studies. 7 (3): i–xiii. doi:10.1080/21604851.2018.1453622. (Retracted, see doi:10.1080/21604851.2018.1453622)
- M. Smith (pseudonym) (2018). "Going in Through the Back Door: Challenging Straight Male Homohysteria and Transphobia through Receptive Penetrative Sex Toy Use". Sexuality & Culture. 22 (4): 1542. doi:10.1007/s12119-018-9536-0. (Retracted, see doi:10.1007/s12119-018-9536-0)
- Richard Baldwin (borrowed identity) (2018). "An Ethnography of Breastaurant Masculinity: Themes of Objectification, Sexual Conquest, Male Control, and Masculine Toughness in a Sexually Objectifying Restaurant". Sex Roles. 79 (11–12): 762. doi:10.1007/s11199-018-0962-0. (Retracted, see doi:10.1007/s11199-018-0962-0)
- Maria Gonzalez, and Lisa A. Jones (pseudonyms). "Our Struggle Is My Struggle: Solidarity Feminism as an Intersectional Reply to Neoliberal and Choice Feminism". Affilia.

==== Not yet published ====
- Richard Baldwin (borrowed identity). "When the Joke Is on You: A Feminist Perspective on How Positionality Influences Satire". Hypatia.
- Carol Miller (pseudonym). "Moon Meetings and the Meaning of Sisterhood: A Poetic Portrayal of Lived Feminist Spirituality". Journal of Poetry Therapy.

=== Considered ===
==== Revise and resubmit ====
- Richard Baldwin (borrowed identity). "Agency as an Elephant Test for Feminist Porn: Impacts on Male Explicit and Implicit Associations about Women in Society by Immersive Pornography Consumption". Porn Studies.
- Maria Gonzalez (pseudonym). "The Progressive Stack: An Intersectional Feminist Approach to Pedagogy". Hypatia.
- Stephanie Moore (pseudonym). "Super-Frankenstein and the Masculine Imaginary: Feminist Epistemology and Superintelligent Artificial Intelligence Safety Research". Feminist Theory.
- Maria Gonzalez (pseudonym). "Stars, Planets, and Gender: A Framework for a Feminist Astronomy". Women's Studies International Forum.

==== Under review ====
- Carol Miller (pseudonym). "Strategies for Dealing with Cisnormative Discursive Aggression in the Workplace: Disruption, Criticism, Self-Enforcement, and Collusion". Gender, Work and Organization.

=== Rejected ===
- Lisa A. Jones (pseudonym). "Rubbing One Out: Defining Metasexual Violence of Objectification Through Nonconsensual Masturbation". Sociological Theory.
- Carol Miller (pseudonym). "My Struggle to Dismantle My Whiteness: A Critical-Race Examination of Whiteness from within Whiteness". Sociology of Race and Ethnicity.
- Carol Miller (pseudonym). "Queering Plato: Plato's Allegory of the Cave as a Queer-Theoretic Emancipatory Text on Sexuality and Gender". GLQ: A Journal of Gay and Lesbian Studies.
- Richard Baldwin (borrowed identity). "'Pretty Good for a Girl': Feminist Physicality and Women's Bodybuilding". Sociology of Sport Journal.
- Richard Baldwin (borrowed identity). "Grappling with Hegemonic Masculinity: The Roles of Masculinity and Heteronormativity in Brazilian Jiu Jitsu". International Review for the Sociology of Sport.
- Richard Baldwin (borrowed identity). "Hegemonic Academic Bullying: The Ethics of Sokal-style Hoax Papers on Gender Studies". Journal of Gender Studies.
- Richard Baldwin (borrowed identity). "Self-Reflections on Self-Reflections: An Autoethnographic Defense of Autoethnography". Journal of Contemporary Ethnography.
- Brandon Williams (pseudonym). "Masculinity and the Others Within: A Schizoethnographic Approach to Autoethnography". Qualitative Inquiry.
- Helen Wilson (pseudonym). "Rebraiding Masculinity: Redefining the Struggle of Women Under the Domination of the Masculinity Trinity". Signs.

== See also ==
- Cynical Theories
- List of scholarly publishing stings
- Postmodernism Generator
- Science wars
- Trauma culture
- Victim mentality
