= Colwiz =

Research management software

colwiz
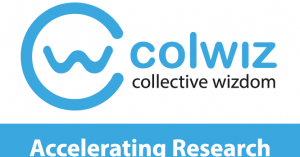
- Original author(s): colwiz Ltd.
- Developer(s): colwiz Ltd.
- Stable release: v.3.16.0509 / May 9, 2016; 8 years ago
- Written in: ActionScript, C++, HTML5, Java, JavaScript, Objective-C
- Operating system: Cross-platform
- Size: 57.6 MB
- Available in: English
- Type: Reference Management, Collaboration, Productivity, Social
- Website: www.colwiz.com

colwiz (collective wizdom) is a free web, desktop and mobile based research management software, designed by researchers from the University of Oxford. colwiz incorporates reference management, collaboration and networking tools, as well as productivity features.

In 2011, colwiz entered into Oxford University's Isis Software Incubator and won the University’s Challenge Seed Fund (UCSF). Following private beta testing, colwiz was launched to public in March 2013, and is now being used globally in research-based companies and institutions including: GlaxoSmithKline, P&G, IBM, Philips, Disney Research, as well as numerous top-tier universities.

In March 2013, colwiz announced a development partnership and strategic investment from the American Chemical Society (ACS), the world's largest scientific society. At the same time, colwiz powered the launch of ACS ChemWorx, a virtual research environment for more than 200,000 ACS members worldwide. In December 2013, colwiz partnered with Royal Society Publishing and Taylor & Francis to launch HTML5 Interactive PDF Reader, which allows researchers to annotate and save PDF articles directly from the publishers' website. In 2017, after collaborating together for several years, Colwiz was acquired by Taylor & Francis.

== History ==
Colwiz was conceived by Tahir Mansoori (CEO and Founder), during his doctoral research in computational biology at the University of Oxford. colwiz entered Isis Innovation Software Incubator in March 2011, and launched the first version of the software in private beta, available to researchers in British and US universities. During the beta testing colwiz gathered feedback from the research community and worked on developing industry partnerships. The beta phase culminated with the announcement of a collaborative partnership between colwiz and ACS, and the launch of colwiz-powered ACS Chemworx and ACS Active View PDF, on 27 March 2013. A day later, colwiz officially came out of beta and entered the public domain. Joint ventures with Royal Society Publishing, and Taylor & Francis, saw release of the colwiz HTML5 Interactive PDF Reader in December 2013.

== Features ==
=== Library ===
The colwiz Library is an application that allows users to find, read, annotate, save and share research articles. Articles can be archived in the Library in customisable folders. The colwiz Import Wizard can automatically add publications to colwiz Library from other common reference libraries (including reference only from EndNote whereas references and PDFs from Mendeley and Zotero) or individually from folders, supporting several different file formats (e.g. BibTeX, PDF and RIS). New research articles can be found with the in-built search engine, which provides users direct access to references from over 30 different databases and file repositories (including ISI Web of Knowledge, Google Scholar, PubMed, Science Direct and Scopus). Users can add notes, links, article and other supporting files to each reference in their colwiz Library; they can also edit reference details if required. An integrated Interactive PDF Reader allows users to take notes and highlight the article directly in the PDF, making any such annotations shareable and searchable. The free account allows users to add 5000 reference entries and 2GB of free storage for PDF files. Users can get extra storage up to 30GB by inviting colleagues.

=== Drive ===
The colwiz Drive is a cloud storage application which lets users store, share and manage their files. Users can upload files, which can then be shared with a group, project or event, by dragging and dropping to the appropriate folder. The Drive also serves as a backup for colwiz Library metadata and personal file storage.

=== Groups ===
The colwiz Web interface provides users with a free platform to collaborate on research projects and events in Groups. Each Group has its own web page with integrated shared features, including: Library, Drive, as well as a discussion panel. Besides collaborating and communicating with fellow researchers, users can also access their colwiz Library online with the same functionalities as in the Desktop application.

=== Web Importer ===
The colwiz Bookmarklet for web browsers provides a shortcut for importing publications to the Library; users can import references to their colwiz Library directly from their web browsers. The colwiz Bookmarklet is compatible with Apple Safari, Google Chrome, Microsoft Internet Explorer and Mozilla Firefox.

=== Citation Plugin for Word Processors ===
The colwiz Desktop Application offers built-in support for citation plugins for Word processors. Users can insert citations in more than 6000 styles and generate bibliographies with a single click. The citation plugin is supported for Microsoft Word (2003, 2007, 2010, 2013, 2016), Neo Office (3.x), Open Office (3.x), Libre Office (3.x) and Star Office (9.x). Additionally, colwiz also supports citation in LaTeX.

=== colwiz for Mobile Devices and Tablets ===
The colwiz Mobile Application is available through the Apple Store for iOS mobile devices, such as iPhone and iPad, and also on Android smart phones and Tablets through Google Play. These applications allow colwiz Library to be accessible while the user is away from the desktop. The mobile applications are synced in real time through colwiz Web, and allow users to search and add new references to colwiz Library, and also attach article PDFs to references.

=== Social ===
colwiz Web hosts a variety of social networking features for researchers, including an activity thread, publication pinboard, and personalised research profiles.

== See also ==
- Comparison of reference management software
