= Helen Pluckrose =

British writer and social critic

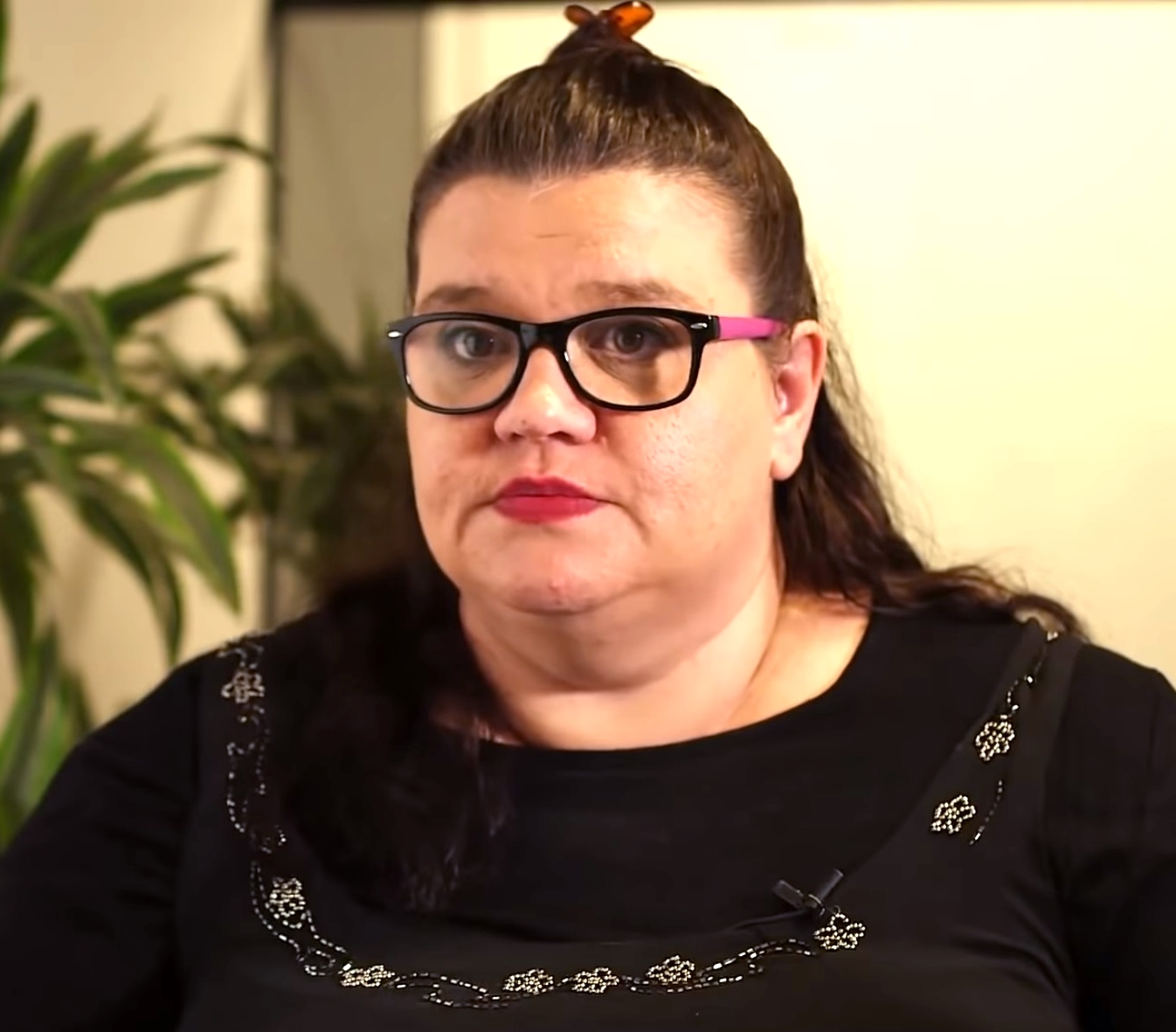
- Pluckrose in 2019
- Education: University of East London (B.A.); Queen Mary University of London (M.A.)
- Occupations: Author, cultural writer
- Known for: Grievance studies affair
- Notable work: Cynical Theories (2020)
- Website: www.hpluckrose.com

Helen Pluckrose is a British author and cultural writer known for critiques of critical theory and social justice activism and promotion of liberal ethics, most notably in the grievance studies affair.

== Education ==
Pluckrose completed a degree in English literature at the University of East London and a master's degree in early modern studies at Queen Mary University of London, with a particular focus on "the ways in which medieval women negotiated the Christian narrative".

== Career ==
=== Social care ===
From the age of 17 to 34, Pluckrose worked in social care mostly providing for the personal care needs of elderly people and those with physical and learning disabilities. At the age of 34, she developed health problems that meant she could no longer work in social care and she decided to study at university.

=== Grievance studies affair ===
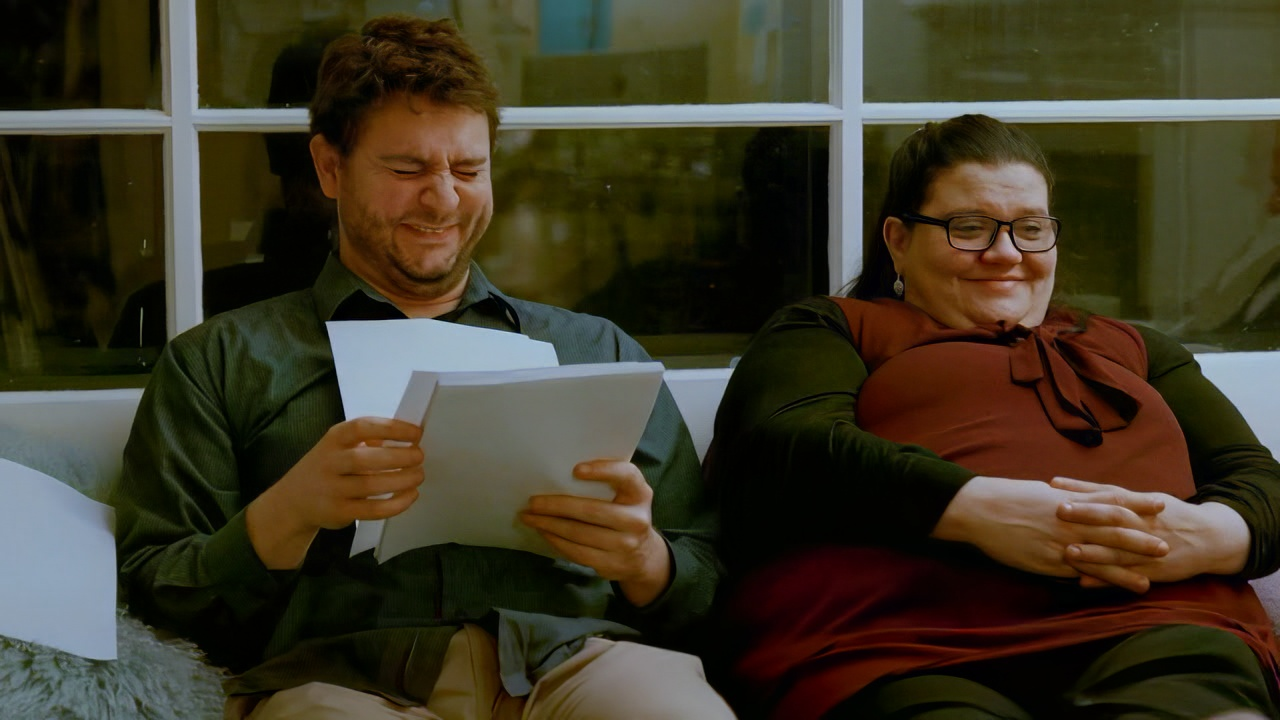
Lindsay and Pluckrose laughing at their grievance studies papers, in 2018

Alongside James A. Lindsay and Peter Boghossian, Pluckrose was involved in the 2017–18 grievance studies affair (also referred to as "Sokal Squared" in reference to the 1996 Sokal affair), a project which saw the group submitting a number of bogus academic papers to peer-reviewed journals in cultural, gender, queer and race studies, to see if they would get published. The authors stated their goal as highlighting poor scholarship and eroding criteria in some academic fields, particularly those influenced by postmodern philosophy and critical theory. Despite criticism of the exposé as a "hoax" and "coordinated attack from the right", Pluckrose and her colleagues describe themselves as "left-leaning liberals".

=== Areo Magazine ===
From 2018 to 2021, Pluckrose was editor-in-chief of Areo Magazine, an opinion and analysis digital magazine exploring "a variety of perspectives compatible with broadly liberal and humanist values". She stepped down from this post in April 2021.

=== Cynical Theories ===
In 2020, Pluckrose released a non-fiction book, Cynical Theories, co-authored with James A. Lindsay and published by Pitchstone Publishing.

=== Counterweight ===
Pluckrose founded Counterweight as a reaction to the growth of implicit bias training and other forms of what Pluckrose calls "critical social justice ideology" in the workplace. The group describes itself as a "non-partisan, grassroots movement advocating for liberal concepts of social justice". Counterweight launched an online advice service in January 2021, which Pluckrose described as "Citizens Advice for the culture wars". Also labelled as an anti-woke helpline, Pluckrose claims that its main purpose was to cultivate dialogue and resolve conflicts. The group published a video which, according to The Telegraph, argued that "woke" activism unfairly judges people by their gender, race and sex, and pledged to provide resources such as mental health support and "expert guidance". Pluckrose ceased working for Counterweight in 2022 but continues to support the cause.

Counterweight closed in May 2023, directing inquiries to other "very capable organisations", including the Institute for Liberal Values. Its original website now has new owners.

=== The Counterweight Handbook ===
In 2024, Pluckrose published The Counterweight Handbook, subtitled "Principal Strategies for Surviving and Defeating Social Justice Ideology - at Work, in Schools and Beyond". The book is published by Swift Press.

== Personal life ==
Pluckrose lives in London with her husband David, a forklift truck driver, and their daughter.

== Bibliography ==
Author:

1. Cynical Theories (2020) by Helen Pluckrose and James Lindsay
2. Social (In)justice (2022) by Helen Pluckrose and James Lindsay
3. The Counterweight Handbook: Principled Strategies for Surviving and Defeating Critical Social Justice - At Work, in Schools, and Beyond (2024) by Helen Pluckrose

Narrator:

How Gender Studies Broke the University (2026) by Cynthia Burack

== See also ==
- Classical liberalism
