= Joanna Williams =

Joanna Williams may refer to:

- Jo Williams (speed skater), British short-track skater
- Joanna Williams (author), British author and commentator
