= Taylor & Francis =

British commercial publishing group

- Parent company: Informa
- Status: Active
- Founded: 1852; 174 years ago
- Founder: William Francis, Richard Taylor
- Country of origin: United Kingdom
- Headquarters location: Milton Park, Abingdon-on-Thames, Oxfordshire, United Kingdom
- Distribution: Bookpoint (Europe, Asia, Africa, Australia) self-distributed (the Americas)
- Key people: Penny Ladkin-Brand (Chief Executive Officer); Leon Heward-Mills (Chief Content Officer); Alex Robinson (Chief Commercial Officer)
- Publication types: Peer-reviewed books and journals
- Nonfiction topics: Humanities, social science, behavioural science, education, law, science, technology, engineering, and mathematics, medicine
- Fiction genres: Non-fiction. Academic and scholarly.
- Imprints: Routledge (humanities, social science, education and law); Taylor & Francis, CRC Press and Garland Science (science, technology, engineering, and mathematics)
- Revenue: £698M in 2024 with an adjusted operating profit of £256M (36.7%) £559.6M in 2019
- No. of employees: 2,400
- Official website: taylorandfrancis.com

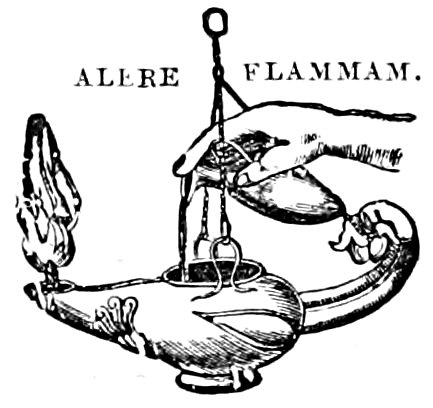
Former logo of Taylor & Francis, from a 1900 publication

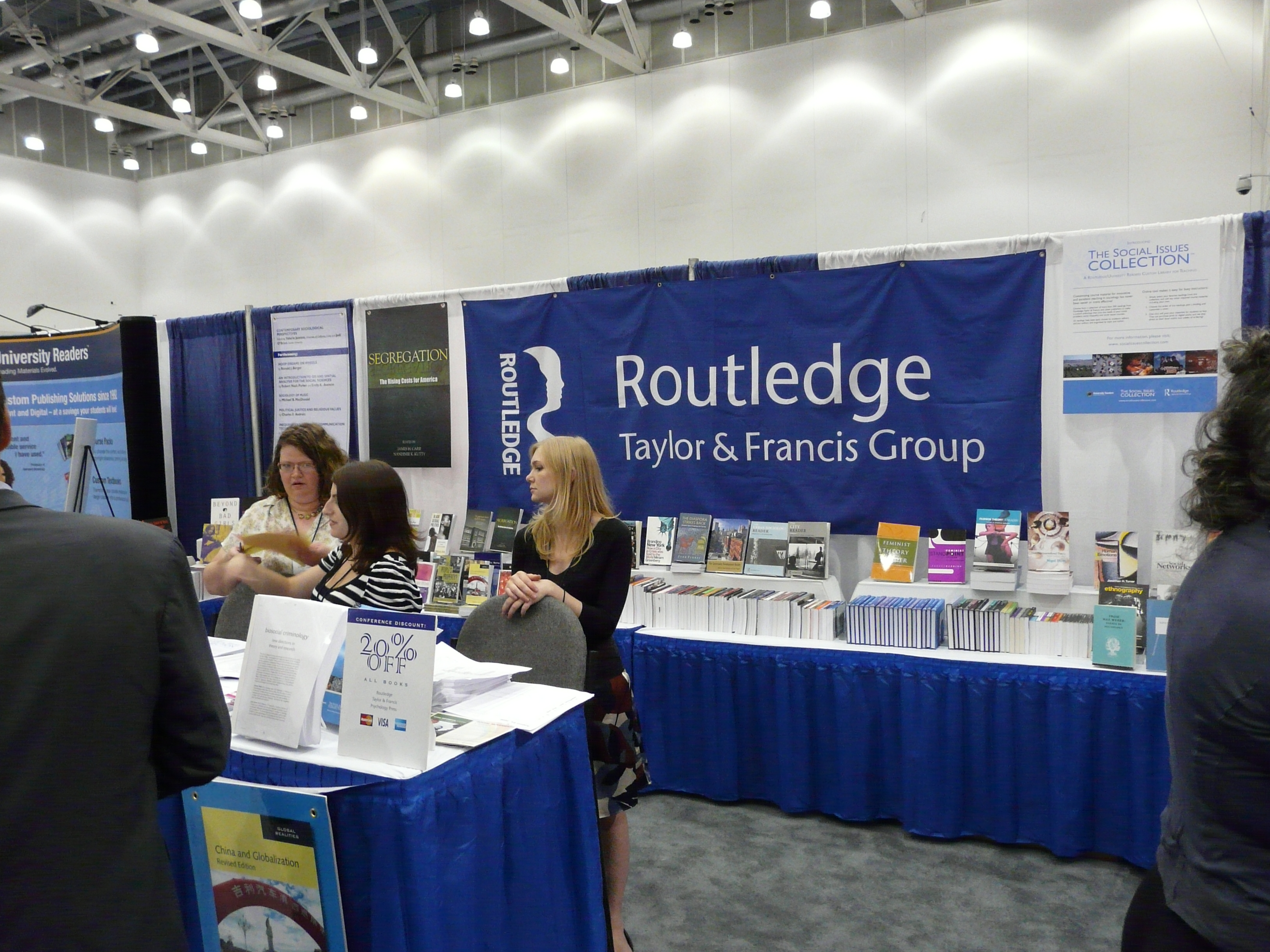
Routledge/Taylor & Francis at an American academic conference, 2008

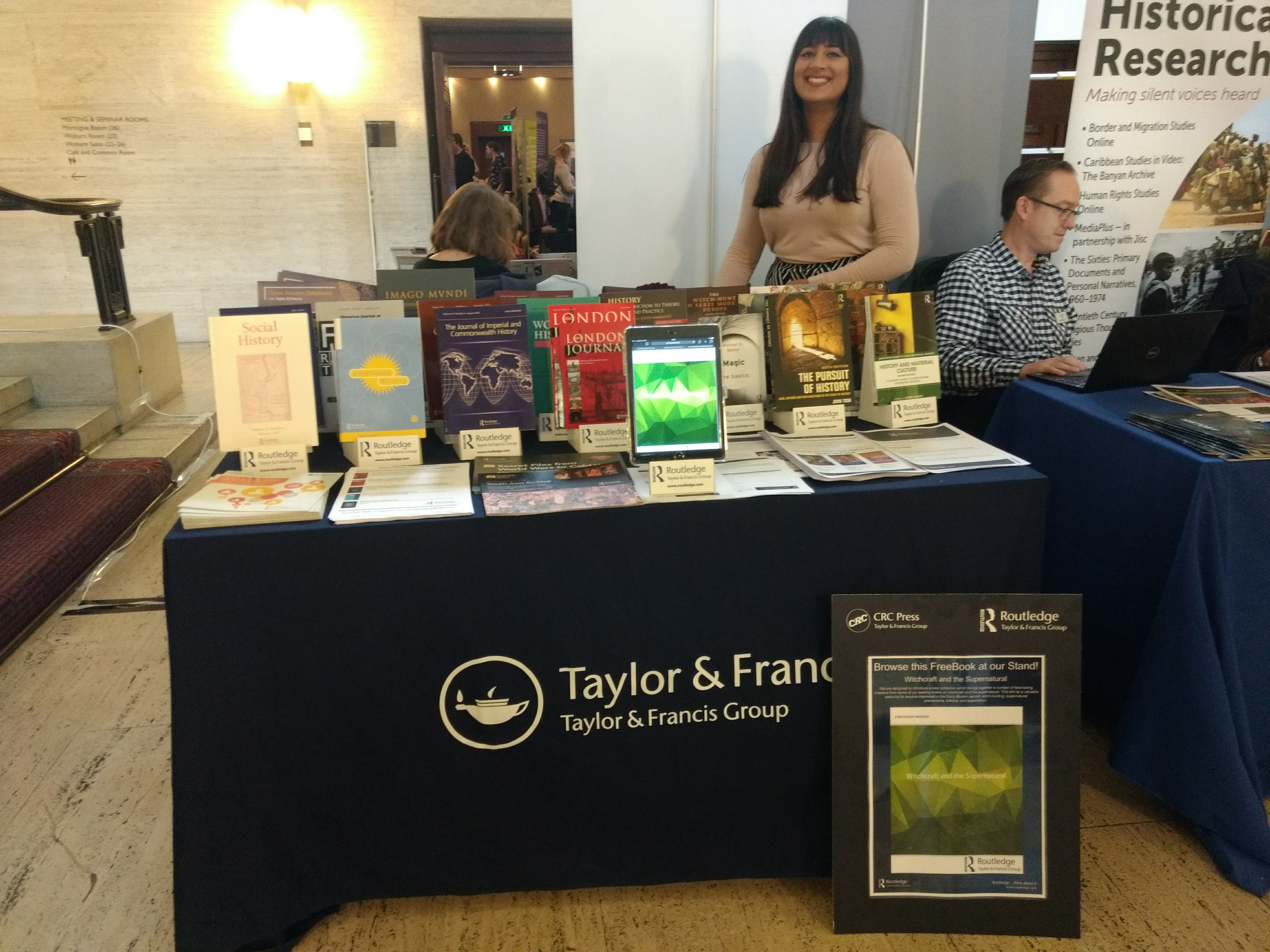
Taylor & Francis at the University of London School of Advanced Study History Day, 2017

Taylor & Francis Group is a British company that publishes books and academic journals. Its parts include Taylor & Francis, CRC Press, Routledge, F1000 Research and Dovepress. It is a division of Informa, a United Kingdom–based publisher and conference company.

== Overview ==
=== Founding ===
The company was founded in 1852 when William Francis joined Richard Taylor in his publishing business. Taylor had founded his company in 1798. Their subjects covered agriculture, chemistry, education, engineering, geography, law, mathematics, medicine, and social sciences. Publications included the Philosophical Magazine.

Francis' son, Richard Taunton Francis (1883–1930), was sole partner in the firm from 1917 to 1930.

=== Acquisitions and mergers ===
In 1965, Taylor & Francis launched Wykeham Publications and began book publishing. T&F acquired Hemisphere Publishing in 1988, and the company was renamed Taylor & Francis Group to reflect the growing number of imprints. Taylor & Francis left the printing business in 1990, to concentrate on publishing. In 1998 it went public on the London Stock Exchange and in the same year bought its academic publishing rival Routledge for £90 million. Acquisition of other publishers has remained a core part of the group's business strategy. It merged with Informa in 2004 to create a new company called T&F Informa, since renamed back to Informa. Following the merger, T&F closed the historic Routledge office at New Fetter Lane in London, and moved to its current headquarters in Milton Park, Oxfordshire.

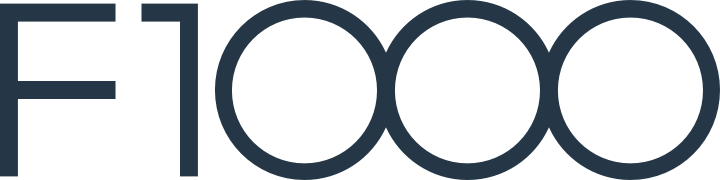
F1000 Research logo

In 2017, T&F sold assets from its Garland Science imprint to W. W. Norton & Company and then ceased to use that brand. In 2017, after collaborating for several years, T&F bought specialist digital resources company Colwiz. In January 2020, T&F bought open research publishing platform F1000.

=== Activities ===
In 2018 Informa PLC reported that Taylor & Francis publishes more than 2,700 journals, and about 7,000 new books each year, with a backlist of over 140,000 titles available in print and digital formats. It uses the Routledge imprint for its publishing in humanities, social sciences, behavioural sciences, law and education, and the CRC Press imprint for its publishing in science, technology, engineering, and mathematics.

As the academic publishing arm of Informa, Taylor & Francis Group accounted for 30.2% of group revenue and 38.1% of adjusted profit in 2017. Taylor & Francis is generally considered the smallest of the 'Big Four' science, technology, engineering, and mathematics (STEM) publishers (RELX, Wiley-Blackwell, Springer Science+Business Media, and Taylor & Francis). Informa (including the Taylor & Francis imprint) was ranked by Simba Information as the leading global academic publisher in the areas of humanities and social sciences, in Global Social Science & Humanities Publishing 2016-2020.

The company's journals are delivered through the Taylor & Francis Online website and its ebooks through the Taylor & Francis website. Taylor & Francis offers Open Access publishing options in both its books and journals. Its digital content services include Routledge Handbooks Online, the Routledge Performance Archive, and the Routledge Encyclopedia of Modernism.

Taylor & Francis is a member of several professional publishing bodies including the Open Access Scholarly Publishing Association (OASPA), the International Association of Scientific, Technical, and Medical Publishers (STM), the Association of Learned & Professional Society Publishers (ALPSP) and The Publishers Association (PA).

Taylor & Francis is a signatory of the SDG Publishers Compact, and has taken steps to support the achievement of the Sustainable Development Goals (SDGs). These include replacing plastic with responsibly-sourced paper packaging to mail journals and achieving CarbonNeutral® publication certification for their print books and journals.

The old Taylor and Francis logo depicts a hand pouring oil into a lit lamp, along with the Latin phrase alere flammam – "to feed the flame [of knowledge]". The modern logo is a stylised oil lamp in a circle.

== Company figures ==
The group has about 1,800 employees in at least 18 offices worldwide. Its head office is in Milton Park, Abingdon-on-Thames in the United Kingdom, with other offices in Stockholm, Leiden, New York City, Boca Raton, Philadelphia, Kentucky, Singapore, Kuala Lumpur, Hong Kong, Beijing, Shanghai, Taipei, Melbourne, Sydney, Cape Town, Tokyo and New Delhi.

Taylor & Francis reported a mean 2017 gender pay gap of 24.2% for its UK workforce, while the median was 8%. The fact that the average pay for women was significantly worse than the median pay (compared to men's) shows that women were underrepresented in the positions with the highest pay.

== Evaluation and controversies ==
As of May 2022, 836 Taylor & Francis journals are listed in the Norwegian Scientific Index of which 753 have a rating of "level 1" (meets academic standard), 70 have a rating "level 2" (the highest level, indicating rigorous academic quality), one has a rating of "level X" (decision on rating in progress), and 13 have a rating of "level 0" (indicating non-academic quality).

Taylor & Francis has faced criticism for its use of author licensing agreements, and several of their journals have been criticized or retracted papers due to concerns over review and publishing practices.

=== Journal protests ===
In 2013, the entire board of the Journal of Library Administration resigned in a dispute over author licensing agreements.

=== Academic practices ===
In 2016, Critical Reviews in Toxicology was accused by the Center for Public Integrity of being a "broker of junk science". Monsanto was found to have worked with an outside consulting firm to induce the journal to publish a biased review of the health effects of its product "Roundup".

In 2017, Taylor & Francis was strongly criticized for removing the editor-in-chief of International Journal of Occupational and Environmental Health, who accepted articles critical of corporate interests. The company replaced the editor with a corporate consultant without consulting the editorial board.

In 2017 as part of the Grievance studies affair hoax articles, the T&F journal Cogent Social Sciences accepted one of "The conceptual penis as a social construct" that had previously been rejected by another Taylor & Francis journal, Norma: International Journal for Masculinity Studies, which suggested the study would be a good fit for Cogent Social Sciences. When the authors announced the hoax, the article was retracted. In 2018, another Grievance studies affair article "Human reactions to rape culture and queer performativity at urban dog parks in Portland, Oregon" was published in Gender, Place & Culture, which was also retracted later that year.

In December 2018, the journal Dynamical Systems accepted the paper "Saturation of Generalized Partially Hyperbolic Attractors" only to have it retracted after publication due to the Iranian nationality of the authors. The European Mathematical Society condemned the retraction and later announced that Taylor & Francis had agreed to reverse the decision. Previous instances of Taylor & Francis journals discriminating against Iranian authors were reported in 2013.

In 2022 there has been much debate about the Accelerated Publication service offered by Taylor & Francis for some of its biomedical journals. For $7,000, a scientist can expedite the peer review process and be published in as few as three weeks.

=== Manipulation of bibliometrics ===
Self-citation is a practice that can inflate the seeming prestige of a journal or group. In 2020, six T&F journals were found by analytics company Clarivate that exhibited unusual levels of self-citation, and as a consequence they were suspended from Journal Citation Reports and saw a drop in their journal impact factors. An April 2022 article in the T&F journal Accountability in Research outlined some of the factors leading to consistent suspension from Journal Citation Reports.

=== Antitrust lawsuit ===
In September 2024, Lucina Uddin, a neuroscience professor at UCLA, sued Taylor & Francis along with five other academic journal publishers in a proposed class-action lawsuit, alleging that the publishers violated antitrust law by agreeing not to compete against each other for manuscripts and by denying scholars payment for peer review services.

=== Conflict of interest between climate research and fossil fuel industry ===
Taylor & Francis is a publisher of climate change research, but they partnered with ExxonMobil, an oil and gas company. Climate scientists are concerned that this conflict of interest could undermine the credibility of climate science because they believe that fossil fuel extraction and climate action are incompatible.

== AI rights controversy ==
In 2024, Taylor & Francis was criticized after selling access to its authors' research to Microsoft as part of an AI partnership. The deal, which allows Microsoft non-exclusive access to content and data to improve AI systems, was made without informing or seeking consent from the authors whose work was involved. Academics expressed surprise and concern upon learning about the agreement, citing issues of transparency, fair compensation, and the potential impact on academic research. The Society of Authors raised concerns about publishers entering such deals without consulting creators, emphasizing the need to protect authors' rights and consider the broader implications for the creative industries.

== Acquired companies and discontinued imprints ==
- A.A. Balkema (acquired in 2003)
- Accelerated Developments Inc. (acquired in 1994)
- Acumen Publishing (acquired in 2014)
- Adam Hilger (acquired in 2005 as part of IOP Publishing books division)
- AK Peters (acquired in 2010)
- Allen & Unwin (Textbooks & Professional Lists) (acquired in 2020)
- The Analytic Press (acquired with Lawrence Erlbaum and Associates in 2006)
- Anderson Publishing (acquired in 2014 from Elsevier)
- Architectural Press
- Arnold (acquired in 2012)
- Ashgate Publishing (acquired in July 2015)
- Auerbach Publications
- Baywood Publishing (acquired in 2016)
- Bellwether Publishing (acquired in 2013)
- Bibliomotion (acquired in 2016)
- BIOS Scientific Publishers (acquired in 2003)
- Bloomsbury Journals (acquired in 2015)
- Brunner-Mazel
- Brunner-Routledge (acquired in 1998)
- Carfax (acquired with Routledge in 1998)
- Cavendish (acquired in 2006)
- Crane, Russak (acquired 1984)
- Colwiz
- Critical Publishing (acquired in 2025)
- CRC Press (acquired in 2003) This imprint is still used.
- Curzon (acquired in 2001)
- David Fulton Press
- Dove Medical Press (acquired in 2017)
- Donhead Publishing (acquired in 2013)
- Earthscan (acquired in 2011)
- Europa Publications (acquired in 1999)
- F1000 Research (acquired in 2020)
- Falmer Press (acquired in 1979)
- Fitzroy Dearborn Publishers (acquired in 2002)
- Focal Press (acquired in 2012)
- Frank Cass (acquired in 2003)
- Future Science Group
- Garland Science (acquired in 1996, closed 2018)
- Gordon & Breach (acquired in 2001)
- Gower (acquired with Ashgate in 2015)
- Greengage Press (acquired in 2013)
- Greenleaf Publishing/GSE Research (acquired in 2017)
- Harwood Academic (acquired with Gordon & Breach in 2001)
- Haworth Press (acquired in 2007)
- Heldref Publications (except World Affairs) (acquired in 2009)
- Hemisphere Publishing (acquired in 1988)
- Hodder Education Group (acquired 2012)
- Holcomb Hathaway (acquired in 2016)
- Karnac Publishing (acquired in 2017)
- Landes Bioscience (acquired in 2014)
- Lawrence Erlbaum and Associates (acquired in 2006)
- Left Coast Press Inc. (acquired in 2016)
- Maney Publishing (acquired in 2015)
- Manson Publishing (acquired in 2014)
- Marcel Dekker (acquired in 2003)
- Martin Dunitz (acquired in 1999)
- M.E. Sharpe, Inc. (acquired in 2014)
- Paradigm Publishers (acquired in 2014)
- Parthenon Publishing (acquired with CRC Press in 2003)
- PeerJ (acquired 2024)
- Pickering & Chatto Publishers (acquired in 2015)
- Planners Press (acquired in 2017 from the American Planning Association)
- Productivity Press (acquired in 2007)
- Prufrock Press (acquired in 2021)
- Psychology Press (formerly the European division of Lawrence Erlbaum, acquired in 1995)
- Pyrczak Publishing (acquired in 2016)
- Radcliffe Healthcare (acquired in 2015)
- RFF Press (acquired with Earthscan in 2011)
- Routledge (acquired in 1998) This imprint is still used.
- Scandinavian University Press Journals (acquired in 2000)
- Slack Books (acquired in 2024)
- Speechmark Publishing (acquired in 2016)
- Spon Press (acquired with Routledge in 1998)
- St. Jerome Publishing (acquired in 2013)
- Stenhouse (acquired in 2023)
- Stylus (acquired in 2023)
- Swets & Zeitlinger Publishers (acquired in 2003)
- Taylor Graham Journals (acquired in 2003)
- Transaction Publishers (acquired in 2016)
- Westview Press (acquired in 2017)
- Willan Publishing (acquired in 2010)

== See also ==
- Taylor & Francis academic journals
