= J. Anderson Thomson =

American psychiatrist and writer

- Education: Duke University (BA), University of Virginia (M.D.)
- Occupations: Psychiatrist, writer
- Scientific career
- Workplaces: private practice in Charlottesville, Virginia, Counseling and Psychological Services at the University of Virginia Student Health Services, Institute of Law, Psychiatry and Public Policy, Region Ten Community Services
- Website: www.jandersonthomson.com

J. Anderson Thomson Jr. is an American psychiatrist and writer. He is a Trustee of the Richard Dawkins Foundation for Reason and Science and board member of the Center for Inquiry. He is staff psychiatrist for Counseling and Psychological Services at the University of Virginia Student Health Center, as well as the University of Virginia's Institute for Law, Psychiatry and Public Policy. Thomson also has his own private practice, and is a forensic psychiatrist for Region Ten Community Services. Thomson acquired his B.A. from Duke University in 1970, he acquired his M.D. from the University of Virginia in 1974, and he did his adult psychiatry training at the University of Virginia from 1974 to 1977.

Thomson has published papers on a variety of issues, including racism, narcissistic personality disorder, forensic psychiatry, depression and PTSD. He is known for his work on evolutionary psychology, as well as for his exploration of the cognitive and evolutionary basis of religious belief, as presented in his latest book entitled Why We Believe in God(s): A Concise Guide to the Science of Faith. Thomson has been a featured speaker at several atheist conferences including American Atheists 2009 and Atheist Alliance International 2009 for which he spoke about his theories on the cognitive origins of religious belief. In an interview with the Austin American-Statesman, Thomson stated, "There is a massive, irreconcilable conflict between science and religion. Religion was humanity's original cosmology, biology and anthropology. It provided explanations for the origin of the world, life and humans. Science now gives us increasingly complete explanations for those big three." He is on the Board of Center for Inquiry.

== JFK Conspiracy Theory ==
When he was young, Thomson had read Jim Garrison's book On the Trail of the Assassins and became convinced that there had been a conspiracy. He then read Gerald Posner's book Case Closed, which showed clearly that Oswald was the killer. While he thought the book was brilliant, he felt that the motivation for the killer, Lee Harvey Oswald, should be made more clear. He wrote a long paper detailing Oswald's mental state. His conclusion was that Oswald was bipolar based on his previous diagnosis in his youth, and had suffered from sexual abuse at the hands of his mother.

== Writings ==
- Federman, Russ; Thomson, J. Anderson (2010). Facing Bipolar: The Young Adult's Guide to Dealing with Bipolar Disorder. Oakland, CA: New Harbinger Publications. ISBN 978-1-57224-642-3.
- Thomson, J. Anderson; Aukofer, Clare (2011). Why We Believe in God(s): A Concise Guide to the Science of Faith. Charlottesville, VA: Pitchstone Publishing. ISBN 978-0-9844932-1-0.
