= Janna Thompson =

Philosopher (1942–2022)

Janna Thompson FASSA FAHA
- Born: Janna Lea Thompson; 12 November 1942; Fairbault, Minnesota, United States of America
- Died: 24 June 2022 (aged 79); Melbourne, Victoria, Australia
- Occupations: Philosopher and ethicist

Academic background
- Education: University of Minnesota
- Alma mater: University of Oxford

Janna Lea Thompson FASSA FAHA (1942–2022) was an American-born philosopher and ethicist, who spent the majority of her academic career in Melbourne, Australia. She is best known for her work on reparative and intergenerational justice.

== Early life and education ==
Janna Lea Thompson was born on 12 November 1942 in Fairbault, Minnesota, USA. She graduated from the University of Minnesota with a Bachelor of Arts degree in 1964 and won a Marshall Plan scholarship which took her to the University of Oxford where she completed a Bachelor of Philosophy in 1966.

== Career ==
Following her graduation, Thompson lectured at the University of Manchester from 1966 to 1970. Next, she moved to Melbourne, Australia to take up a lectureship at Monash University in 1970. While there she undertook a Diploma of Education (tertiary studies). She then joined La Trobe University as a lecturer (1975–1981) and was promoted to senior lecturer (1981–2000) and reader/associate professor (2000–2007), before being made professor (2007–2012).

Thompson died in Melbourne on 24 June 2022, just months following diagnosis of brain tumours.

== Honours and recognition ==
In 2001 Thompson was elected a Fellow of the Australian Academy of the Humanities and of the Australian Academy of the Social Sciences in 2011. She was awarded the Eureka Prize for Research in Ethics in 2006.

== Writing ==
In addition to her books and peer-reviewed journal articles, Thompson contributed to The Conversation and Inside Story and reviewed books for Australian Book Review.

She wrote her final book, Lockdown, during the COVID-19 pandemic. A detective novel, it was launched posthumously.

=== As author ===
- Thompson, Janna (1992). Justice and world order : a philosophical inquiry. Routledge. ISBN 978-0-415-07034-8.
- —— (1998). Discourse and knowledge : defence of a collectivist ethics. Routledge. ISBN 978-0-415-18544-8.
- —— (30 December 2002). Taking responsibility for the past : reparation and historical injustice. Polity; Malden, Mass. : Blackwell Publishers (published 2002). ISBN 978-0-7456-2885-1.
- —— (2009). Intergenerational justice : rights and responsibilities in an intergenerational polity. Routledge. ISBN 978-0-415-99628-0.
- —— (17 July 2018). Should Current Generations Make Reparation for Slavery?. Polity Press (published 2018). ISBN 978-1-5095-1645-2.

=== As editor ===
- Skene, Loane; Thompson, Janna, eds. (2008). The sorting society : the ethics of genetic screening and therapy. Cambridge University Press. ISBN 978-0-511-54557-3.
- Neumann, Klaus; ——, eds. (28 July 2015). Historical justice and memory. The University of Wisconsin Press (published 2015). ISBN 978-0-299-30464-5.
