= Oxford University Innovation =

British R&D consultancy firm

Oxford University Innovation Limited
- Formerly: Isis Innovation (1988–2016); Oxford University Research and Development Ltd (1987–1988)
- Type: Private Limited company
- Industry: Technology transfer
- Headquarters: Oxford, United Kingdom
- Parent: University of Oxford
- Website: innovation.ox.ac.uk

Oxford University Innovation Limited (OUI) is the innovation partner of the University of Oxford. Specialised in technology transfer and knowledge exchange from the University. OUI is a wholly owned subsidiary of the University of Oxford, and is located on Botley Road, Oxford, England. OUI was previously known as Isis Innovation (1988–2016) and Oxford University Research and Development Ltd (1987–1988).

== Overview ==
The company was established in 1987 as Oxford University Research and Development Ltd and was renamed Isis Innovation a year later, becoming Oxford University Innovation (OUI) in 2016.

OUI transforms world-leading academic knowledge and research into innovations that benefit the economy, people and the planet. They do this by protecting intellectual property, supporting company creation and growth, enabling consultancy and connecting researchers with partners and investors.

OUI manage the university's intellectual property (IP) portfolio. Since 1987, OUI has created 350+ companies, with over a third launched in the past five years.

== Patents, licensing, and spinouts ==
Oxford University Innovation files, on average, one patent application each week, manages over 360 patent application families and has concluded over 450 licence agreements which has made Oxford University Innovation "one of the country's most prolific technology transfer offices when it comes to agreeing licensing deals". According to PCT Review 2026 of the World Intellectual Property Organization (WIPO), Oxford University Innovation is the first largest university filer of Patent Cooperation Treaty (PCT) patent applications in the UK, the highest European university applicant and is amont the top 50 university PCT applicants from 2023 to 2025. Oxford University Innovation licenses technologies to companies who invest in developing and selling the products in a timely and ethical manner. Licensees are sought from all technology and business sectors on an international basis.

Oxford University Innovation works with University researchers to develop new business opportunities, identifying and sourcing investment, management and professional services. Since 1988 Oxford University Innovation has assisted in the formation of more than 70 University spin-out companies, generating over £2 billion in unquoted and quoted market valuations for the University of Oxford.

== University Challenge Seed Fund ==
Oxford University Innovation also administers the Oxford University Challenge Seed Fund (UCSF), which was launched in 1999 with investment from the UK Treasury, Wellcome Trust and Gatsby Foundation. The £4 million Oxford UCSF has invested in over 100 projects, ranging in size from £1,700 to £250,000. The overall objective of the UCSF scheme is to enable universities to access seed funds in order to assist the successful transformation of good research into good business.

In 2010, Oxford University Innovation (then Isis Innovation) – in conjunction with the university's 'Oxford Thinking' campaign – created the Oxford Invention Fund (OIF). The open fund allows anyone to donate money which goes towards helping create prototypes or proof-of-concept models from ideas and technologies developed at Oxford to improve the transfer into a commercial setting.

Oxford University Innovation manages the licensing of copyrighted Patient Reported Outcomes (PROs) questionnaires via its Isis Outcomes brand. These questionnaires, developed within the university, are used for academic and commercial clinical studies into a variety of illnesses, including Parkinson's disease and endometriosis. The negotiation of sales agreements for biological and physical science materials such as cell lines and antibodies are also handled by Isis Innovation.

== Startup Incubator ==
Since 2010, Oxford University Innovation has run the Isis startup Incubator (ISI), a business incubator designed to support very early-stage software ventures from students, staff and alumni of the University of Oxford; the Incubator offers physical space and IT facilities as well as commercial mentoring, funding support and business networking facilitation. Oxford University Innovation has links with all the parts of the university involved in technology commercialisation and enterprise. These include:

- Research Services
- Begbroke Science Park
- Oxford Science Enterprise Centre
- Entrepreneurship Said, at the Saïd Business School.

Oxford Spin-out Equity Management (OSEM) was created in 2008 and works closely with Oxford University Innovation and the University of Oxford's Finance Division to manage the university's shareholdings in its spin-out companies and optimising returns on University investments.
