= Joanna Williams (author) =

British author and commentator

Joanna Williams is a British author and commentator for Spiked.

== Books ==
1. Williams, Joanna (2013). Consuming Higher Education: Why Learning Can't be Bought. Bloomsbury Academic. ISBN 9781441183606.
2. Williams, Joanna (2016). Academic Freedom in an Age of Conformity: Confronting the Fear of Knowledge. Palgrave Macmillan. ISBN 9781137514783.
3. Williams, Joanna (2017). Women Vs. Feminism: Why We All Need Liberating from the Gender Wars. Emerald Publishing. ISBN 9781787144767.
4. Williams, Joanna (2022). How Woke Won: The Elitist Movement That Threatens Democracy, Tolerance and Reason. Spiked. ISBN 9781739841324.
