= Pitchstone Publishing =

American publishing company

Pitchstone Publishing is a publishing company based in Durham, North Carolina. Founded by Kurt Volkan in 2003, Pitchstone Publishing has published numerous books by leading academics and scholars, particularly in the fields of secular humanism, new atheism, applied psychiatry, and psychoanalysis.

== Notable books ==
- Attack of the Theocrats! How the Religious Right Harms Us All – and What We Can Do About It (2012) by Sean Faircloth
- Blind Trust: Leaders and Their Followers in Times of Crisis and Terror (2018) by Vamık Volkan
- Caught in the Pulpit: Leaving Religion Behind (2017) by Daniel Dennett and Linda LaScola
- God Bless America: Strange and Unusual Religious Beliefs and Practices in the United States (2013) by Karen Stollznow
- Humanists in the Hood: Unapologetically Black, Feminist, and Heretical (2020) by Sikivu Hutchinson
- Killing in the Name of Identity: A Study of Bloody Conflicts (2014) by Vamik Volkan
- A Manual for Creating Atheists (2013) by Peter Boghossian
- The Obsolete Paradigm of a Historical Jesus (2025) by Richard Carrier
- PsychoBible: Behavior, Religion and the Holy Book (2003) by Armando Favazza
- Why We Believe in God(s): A Concise Guide to the Science of Faith (2011) by J. Anderson Thomson, Jr.
