= Norma (journal) =

- Discipline: Masculinity studies, Gender studies, Sociology
- Language: English
- Edited by: Ulf Mellström, Sam de Boise, Katarzyna Wojnicka

Publication details
- Former name(s): Nordic Journal for Masculinity Studies
- History: 2006-present
- Publisher: Routledge
- Frequency: Quarterly

Standard abbreviations
- ISO 4: Norma

Indexing
- ISSN: 1890-2138 (print); 1890-2146 (web)
- LCCN: 2008201554
- OCLC no.: 474780799

Links
- Journal homepage; Online access; Online archive; Online archive (2006-2013)

Norma: International Journal for Masculinity Studies is a quarterly academic journal in the field of masculinity studies, published by Routledge.

It was established in 2006 as the Nordic Journal for Masculinity Studies, a joint effort of the masculinities studies research communities in Denmark, Finland, Iceland, Norway, and Sweden.

It was published by Universitetsforlaget until it was acquired by Routledge in 2014 and obtained its current title.

The editors-in-chief are Ulf Mellström (Karlstad University), Sam de Boise (Örebro University ) and Katarzyna Wojnicka (University of Gothenburg).
