= Mike Nayna =

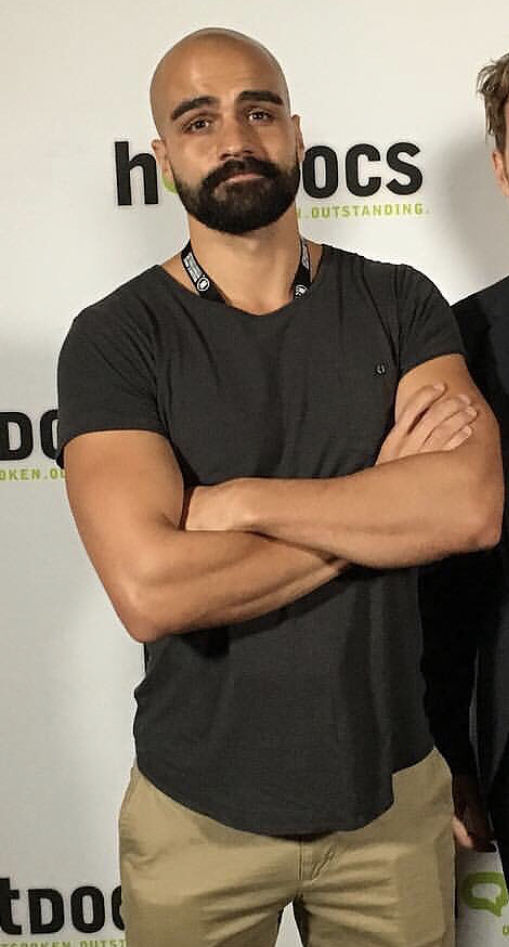
Nayna at the premiere of his film, Digilante, at the Hot Docs Canadian International Documentary Festival in 2017

Mike Nayna is an Australian writer, director, and filmmaker.

== Career ==
In 2012 Nayna filmed an abusive attack on a Melbourne bus, producing a viral video that made headlines around the world.

The incident and ensuing media event was explored in-depth in Nayna's 2016 documentary, Digilante, which premiered on ABC TV and made its international premiere at Hot Docs Canadian International Film Festival. Digilante later won best short film and best sociological documentary at film festivals in the US. The film received positive reviews and was praised by author and documentary filmmaker Jon Ronson and also prompted FilmInk to call Nayna 'one of the most exciting voices in Australia’s next generation of documentary filmmakers'. The film was acquired and distributed by The Atlantic as part of their The Atlantic Selects series

In 2014, Nayna produced, directed, and edited Dayne's World for ABC TV, winning the ABC iview Award and the award for best editing at Melbourne WebFest. Later that year he produced, directed, and edited the Fancy Boy pilot for Fresh Blood Pilot Season, which went on to be picked up for a six-part series for ABC TV and Pivot

In 2016 Nayna co-founded social media network Letter.wiki with brothers Dayne and Clyde Rathbone, which was later acquired by media platform Substack.
