= Gender, Place & Culture =

- Discipline: Geography
- Language: English
- Edited by: Lena Grip

Publication details
- History: 1994–present
- Publisher: Carfax Publishing (Routledge) (United Kingdom)
- Frequency: Monthly
- Impact factor: 1.180 (2015)

Standard abbreviations
- ISO 4: Gend. Place Cult.

Indexing
- CODEN: GPCUE9
- ISSN: 0966-369X (print); 1360-0524 (web)
- LCCN: 95652870
- OCLC no.: 37915521

Links
- Journal homepage; Online archive

Gender, Place & Culture: A Journal of Feminist Geography is a peer-reviewed journal published 12 times a year by Taylor & Francis. It is an international journal in feminist geography and aims to provide "a forum for debate in human geography and related disciplines on theoretically-informed research concerned with gender issues".

The journal's Managing Editor as of 2021 is Lena Grip of Karlstad University.

== Abstracting and indexing ==
- Alternative Press Index
- ASSIA: Applied Social Sciences Index and Abstracts
- British Humanities Index
- Family Studies Database
- Gay & Lesbian Abstracts
- Feminist Periodicals: A Current Listing of Contents
- Geo Abstracts
- International Regional Science Review
- Multicultural Education Abstracts
- Social Planning/Policy & Development Abstracts
- Sociological Abstracts
- Studies on Women Abstracts
- Social Sciences Citation Index
- Web of Science

According to the Journal Citation Reports, the journal has a 2015 impact factor of 1.180, ranking it 13th out of 40 journals in the category "Women's Studies".

== Controversy ==
In 2018 the journal was the target of a scholarly publishing sting called the Grievance Studies affair. They were published by a team of three authors, Peter Boghossian, James A. Lindsay, and Helen Pluckrose to highlight what they saw as poor scholarship and erosion of standards in several academic fields. The paper titled "Human Reactions to Rape Culture and Queer Performativity in Urban Dog Parks in Portland, Oregon" was reviewed, accepted, and received an award. The paper proposed that "human males may be metaphorically ‘shocked’ out of regarding sexual violence, sexual harassment, and rape culture". The article was retracted after the hoax was exposed. By the time of the reveal, seven of the group's twenty papers had been accepted for publication, seven were still under review, and six had been rejected. Included among the articles that were published were arguments that dogs engage in rape culture and that men could reduce their transphobia by anally penetrating themselves with sex toys, as well as part of a chapter of Adolf Hitler's Mein Kampf rewritten in feminist language. One of the published papers, in particular, had won special recognition from the journal.

== See also ==
- List of women's studies journals
