= Affilia =

Affilia: Feminist Inquiry in Social Work
- Discipline: Social work
- Language: English
- Edited by: Sara Goodkind, Mimi E. Kim, Jennifer Zelnick

Publication details
- History: 1986–present
- Publisher: SAGE Publications
- Frequency: Quarterly
- Impact factor: 1.597 (2021)

Standard abbreviations
- ISO 4: Affilia

Indexing
- ISSN: 0886-1099 (print); 1552-3020 (web)
- LCCN: 90656452
- OCLC no.: 12871850

Links
- Journal homepage; Online access; Online archive

Affilia: Feminist Inquiry in Social Work is a quarterly peer-reviewed academic journal that covers social work practices and feminist analysis of gender inequality. The editors-in-chief are Sara Goodkind (University of Pittsburgh School of Social Work), Mimi E. Kim (California State University, Long Beach), and Jennifer Zelnick (Touro University System). The journal was established in 1986 and is published by SAGE Publications. The founding editor was Beatrice Saunders.

== Abstracting and indexing ==
The journal is abstracted and indexed in Scopus and the Social Sciences Citation Index. According to the Journal Citation Reports, the journal has a 2021 impact factor of 1.597.

== Grievance studies affair ==
In October 2018, it was revealed that the journal had accepted for publication a hoax article entitled "Our Struggle Is My Struggle: Solidarity Feminism as an Intersectional Reply to Neoliberal and Choice Feminism." It was later reported that the manuscript included plagiarized sections from Chapter 12 of Adolf Hitler's Mein Kampf (My Struggle), in which Hitler describes why the Nazi Party is needed and what it requires of its members. The authors replaced Hitler's references to "National Socialism" with "feminism" and "Jews" with "privilege". The submission of the paper was an attempt to show the lack of rigor in some fields of academia, so-called "grievance studies", by demonstrating that absurdities and morally fashionable political ideas could get published as legitimate academic research in the field.

== See also ==
- List of women's studies journals
