= Sociology of the family =

Branch of sociology

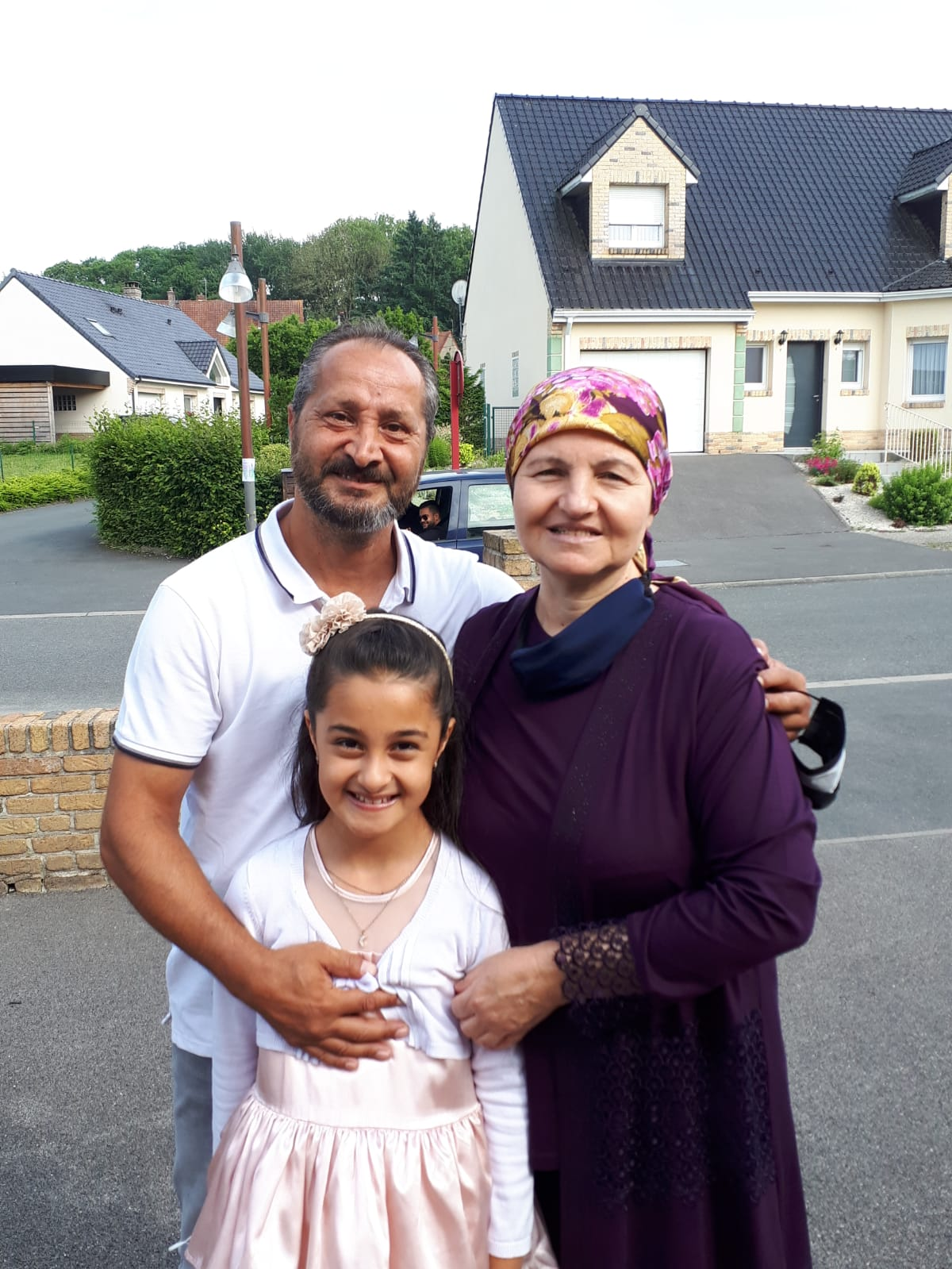
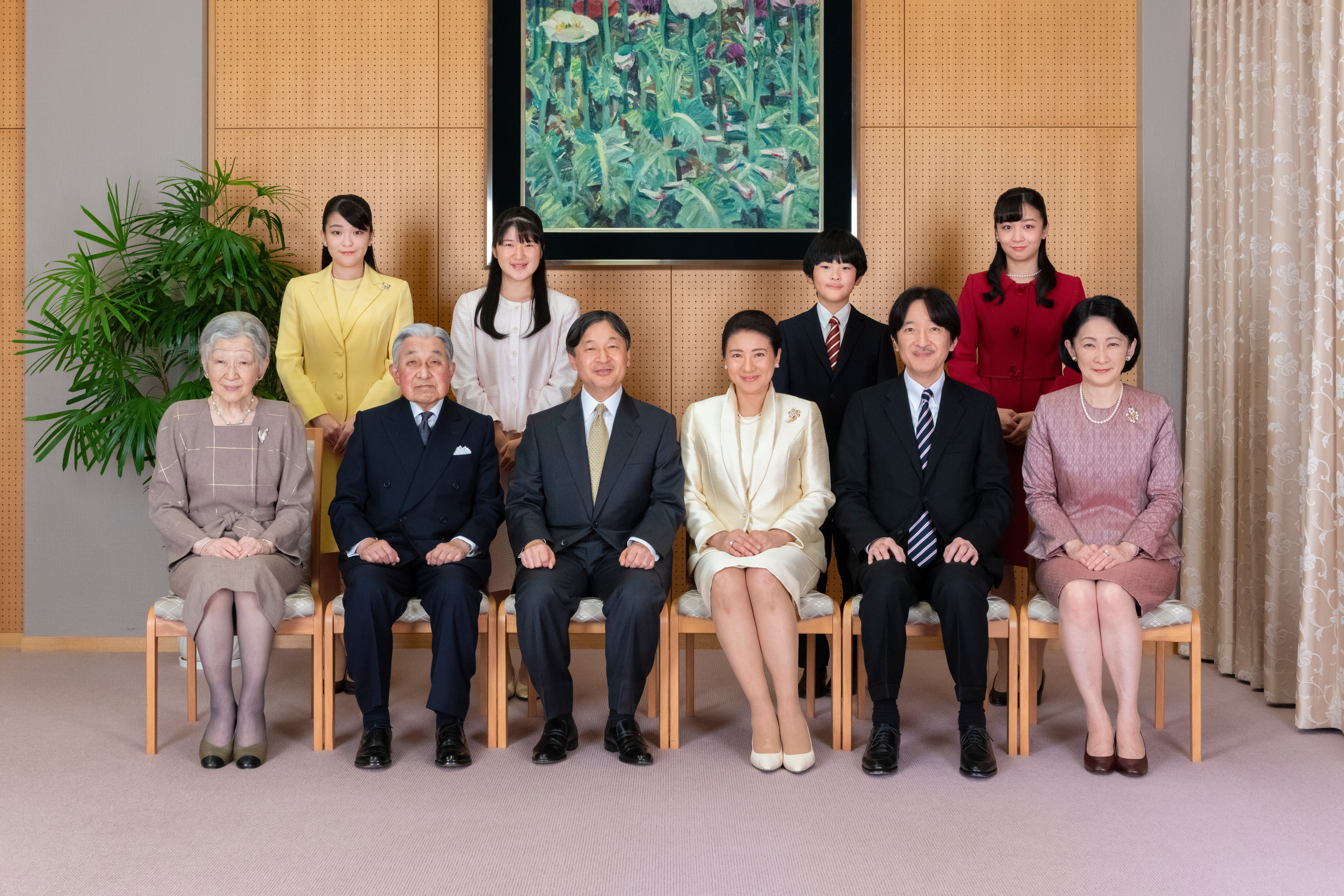
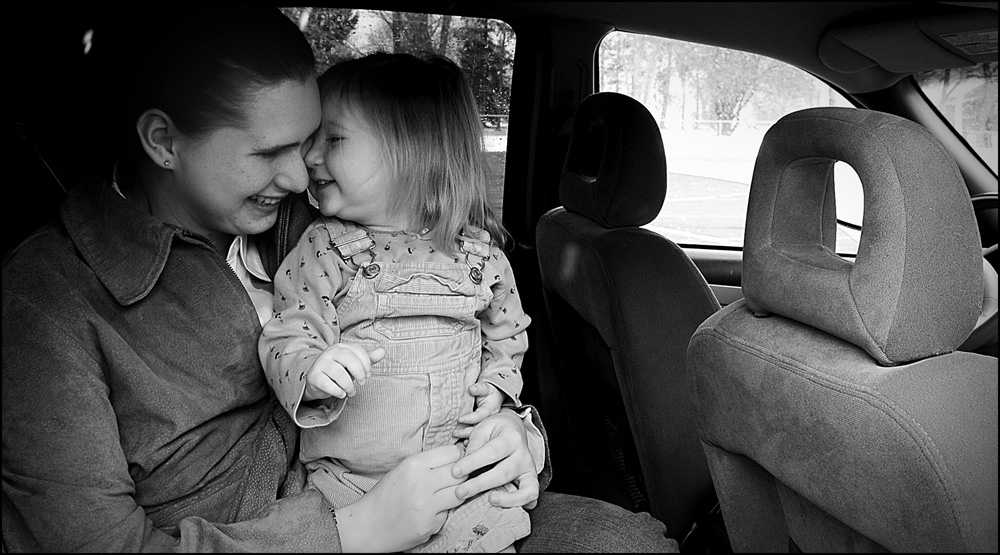
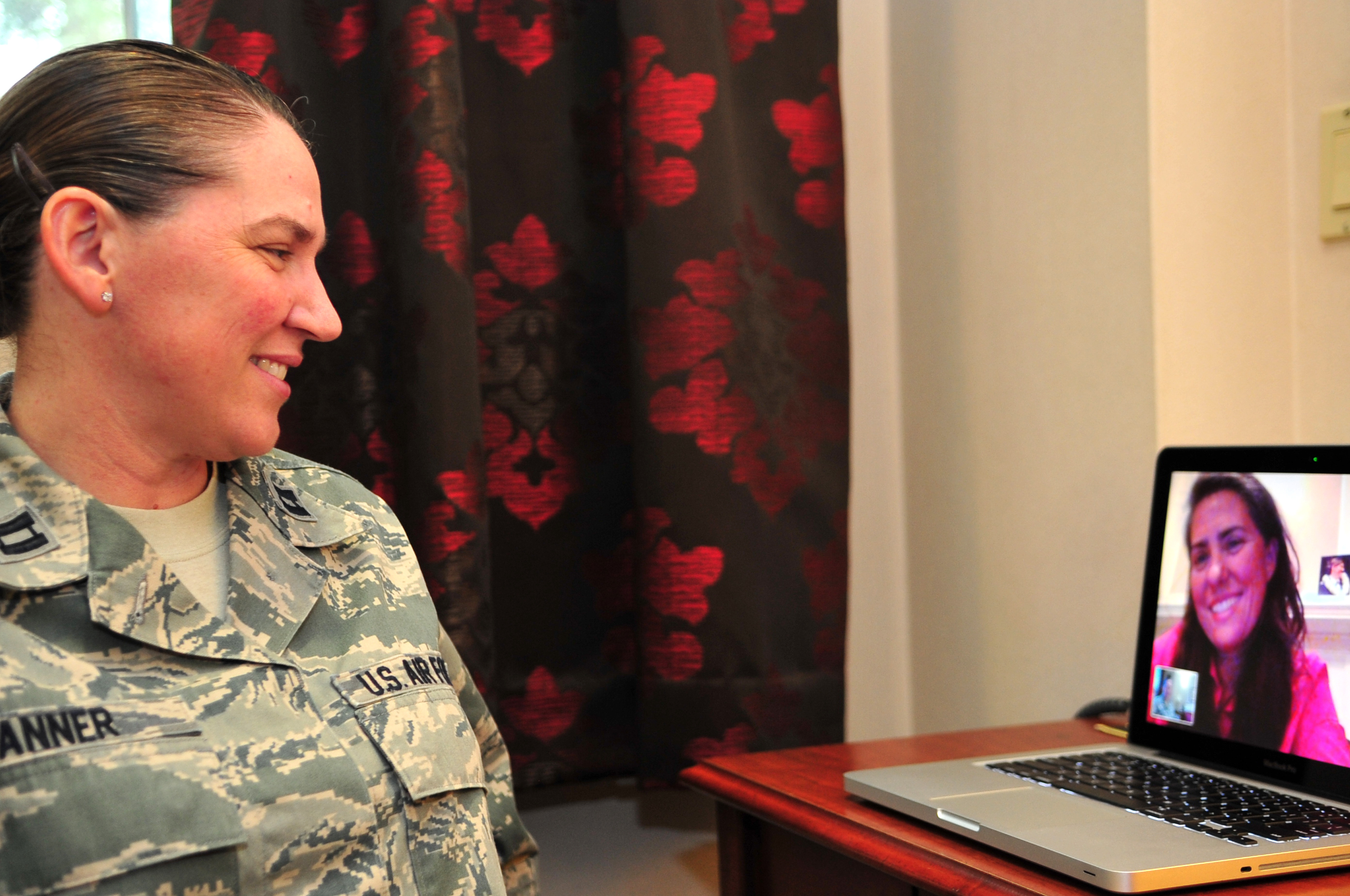
Families. Top-left: a family in France with a daughter, mother, and father. Top-right: the Imperial Family of Japan. Bottom-left: Marisa Beagle and her daughter in a school carpark. Bottom-right: Capt. Dawn Tanner, 51st Medical Operations Squadron Family Advocacy element leader, FaceTimes with her wife, Dana McCown, retired lieutenant colonel, at the Turumi Lodge on Osan Air Base, South Korea.

Sociology of the family is a subfield of sociology in which researchers and academics study family structure as a social institution and unit of socialization from various sociological perspectives. It can be seen as an example of patterned social relations and group dynamics.

== Main areas of focus ==
Pillars	Focus Areas	Examples
Demographics	Family size, age, ethnicity, diversity, gender	Average age of marriage is getting older.; Traditional: male as breadwinner and female as homemaker; Increase in divorce rates
Domain / Sphere	Which aspects of family life are considered important by the family, government, or group	Views about marriage and sexuality; State policies that concern family structure and benefits
Change and interaction	Interactions of family members with each other, other organizations, impact of policy measures	Increase in gender fluid roles within the family household.; Baby boomer generation; Influence of living in a multi-generational household.; Long-distance relationships – overseas workers
Ideology	Family based beliefs and psychological effects	How the choices of parents affect their children.; Effects of same sex couples and marriages on children.; Male or female infertility
Social class	Economic indicators and capital, mobility, professions, household income, highest level of education of family members	Mobility of immigrant families in the United States; Low birthrates among highly educated women in Japan

== Methodology ==
=== Quantitative ===
Quantitative studies in family sociology usually rely on data from survey research, or official vital statistics and national census surveys. For example, in the United States, the national census occurs every 10 years, supplemented by the American Community Survey, the Current Population Survey and other surveys in between. These are conducted by the U.S. Census Bureau. Their data provides statistics on trends in household and family composition, and is reported in the Families and Living Arrangements series. This includes childcare, children, child support, families and households, fertility, grandparents and grandchildren, marriage and divorce, and same-sex couples.

=== Qualitative ===
Another method is ethnographic or participatory observation research of families, which usually reduces the sample size to have a more intimate analysis of the conjugal or other family structure. In general, a qualitative approach to research is an excellent way to investigate group dynamics and family relationships. Specifically, qualitative research on the topic of families is particularly useful when looking at: 1) deeper meanings about family interactions and reklationships 2) learning more about the insider views about relational processes and observing interactions 3) looking at the family from within a greater context and 4) providing a voice for marginalized family members (e.g. case of abuse). Often, qualitative data is able to provide ample data that is rich and meaningful, especially for structurally diverse families.

== Sociology of interracial intimacy ==
The construction of race in Western society and, to a degree, globally, has led to a distinct view of interracial intimacy. Although interracial relationships and marriages have become far more popular and socially acceptable in the United States and Western Europe since the Civil Rights era, these unions continue to be viewed with less than total acceptance by significant portions of the population. More historically, American Families by Stephanie Coontz treats the difficulties these couples went through during the time before Loving v. Virginia, when interracial marriage bans were declared unconstitutional. These bans functioned to enforce the one-drop rule and reenforce identity and privilege. Internationally, the far right continues to promote ideas of racial purity by working against the normalization of interracial couples and families.

== Pre-modern family life and religious discourse ==
Historically, religious discourses have played a significant role in constituting family members and constructing particular forms of behavior in families, and religion has been particularly important in discourses on female sexuality. An example of the role of religion in this respect was the 'witchcraft craze' in medieval Europe. According to Turner, this was a device to regulate the behavior of women, and the attack on women as witches was principally "a critique of their sexuality". "Women were closely associated with witchcraft, because it was argued that they were particularly susceptible to the sexual advances of the devil. ... Women were seen to be irrational, emotional and lacking in self-restraint; they were especially vulnerable to satanic temptation."

Turner argues that attempts to regulate female sexuality through religious discourse have, in the case of Western Europe, to be understood in the context of concerns about managing private property and ensuring its continuity. Thus, for the land-owning aristocracy, the point of marriage was to produce a male heir to the property of the household. Since child mortality was common, women had to be more or less continuously pregnant during their marriage to guarantee a living male heir. Furthermore, this heir had to be legitimate, if disputes over inheritance were to be avoided. This legitimacy could only be ensured by the heads of households marrying virgins and ensuring the chastity of their wives for the duration of the marriage. Equally, daughters had to be sexually pure if they were to be eligible for marriage to other property-holding families. Such marriages were prompted solely by the need to produce children and had none of the elements of eroticism and sexual compatibility of contemporary marriages.

In pre-modern Europe, these interests were reflected in the character of marriages. They were private, arranged contracts that could be easily dissolved in the event of child production being compromised by the woman's infertility or infidelity. With the entry of the Church into marriage arrangements, different definitions of marriage emerged. Lifelong marriages were demanded, but with a concern to regulate sexuality, particularly the sexuality of women.

== Sociology of marriage ==
Judeo-Christian belief system marriage is modeled after the Genesis story of Adam and Eve and its framework of a lifetime commitment between man and woman. The married couple produces children, constituting the nuclear family. Some sociologists now dispute the degree to which this idealized arrangement has and does reflect the true structure of families in American society. In her 1995 article The American Family and the Nostalgia Trap, sociologist Stephanie Coontz first posited that the American family has always been defined first and foremost by its economic needs. For instance, in colonial times families often relied on slaves or indentured servants to support themselves economically. The modern "breadwinner–homemaker model", argues Coontz, then has little historical basis. Only in the 1950s did the myth of the happy, nuclear family as the correct family structure arise.

Family structure is changing drastically and there is a vast variety of different family structures: "The modern family is increasingly complex and has changed profoundly, with greater acceptance for unmarried cohabitation, divorce, single-parent families, same-sex partnerships and complex extended family relations. Grandparents are also doing their bit."

Yet Coontz argues in Marriage, A History that during the 20th century, marriages have become increasingly unstable in the United States as individuals have begun to seek unions for the ideals of love and affection rather than social or economic expediency. This transition has blurred the division of labor within the breadwinner–homemaker model, such that maintenance of the household and childcare, called the "second shift", are now topics for debate between marital partners. Sociologist Arlie Russell Hochschild argues in The Second Shift that despite changes in perceptions of the purpose of marriage and the economic foundations for marriage, women continue to do the bulk of care work to the detriment of the American family. Hochschild illustrates the ways in which an unequal division of the second shift undermines family welfare by reducing marital equality and spousal satisfaction.

Today we see a modified version of a homemaker and breadwinner marriage where the woman adopts a breadwinner role but is still expected to take care of the home. This is considered to be a neo-traditionalist, where one believes that a woman is expected to work if she desires but only if it does not interfere with her real domestic job at home. Consequently, this forces women into disadvantaged career opportunities that are structured around the primary obligation to be a homemaker and reasserts the gender labor market inequality.

Families and marriage have increasingly become areas where gender matters. However, gender differences in marriage have too often been perceived as merely an "individual struggle and depoliticized by reducing social inequalities to differences".

=== The marriage market: determining who marries whom ===
There are many theoretical models to describe how people determine whom to marry. An important gender-focused approach is an intersectional approach that combines education level and gender. Men and women operate in a "marriage market" that is influenced by many competing factors. One of the most decisive factors is education level. Studies have shown that men and women tend to marry partners that have attained a level of education similar to their own, a concept known as social assortative mating. In a 2015 study by Bruze, Svarer, and Weiss, low education is defined as a high-school education or less, medium education is defined as vocational education, and high education is defined as a college education. Marriages depend on the expectations of two people and are "formed and terminated" based on those expectations. Consequently, individuals "are selected into and out of the marriage market on the basis of their education". The most distinct marital trend is that men with low education are slowly selected out of the marriage market, instead remaining single. The driving force behind this process is that a marriage in which both partners or only the husband have low education end with divorce at a substantially higher rate than marriages where both partners or the husband do not have low education. Young women with medium education levels tend to have the highest rates of marriage. Highly educated men tend to marry highly educated women. Moreover, men and women who have attained high levels of education delay marriage past the age when other individuals typically marry. This trend becomes stronger with age: the proportion of men with high educations who are married to women with similarly high educations reaches 64% when the men are 46 years old.

Another important intersectional factor to consider in relation to gender and marriage is marriage markets. Marriage market means how economics affects who marries, whose bonds endure and what this means for future generations of workers and parents. Analyzing marriage markets as they pertain to marriage has several benefits. First, marriage market conditions are forces that influence marriage from outside they subjects affect, which means they impact the general trends of marriage decisions. In other words, individual circumstances cause people to make decisions about their marriages that might be specific to their personal situation; marriage markets impact all peoples' decisions about marriage from a macro level, which means steady incomes and jobs make for sound marriage. In addition, job stability benefits both employers through greater productivity and families though more cohesion. Second, marriage market conditions may capture many economic influences. Empirical findings indicate that financial stability is an important requisite for marriage. In weak marriage markets (when there is high unemployment) couples who would like to get married may delay doing so due to unemployment or financial troubles. Furthermore, even couples that are already married may face doubts about the future economic status of themselves or their partners, which can create marital instability. Conversely, strong labor markets (when unemployment is low) may improve the employment situation and financial situation of either partner, which may facilitate marriage and increase economic stability. Thus, when marriage markets are strong and unemployment is low, marriage may be perceived as more attractive to individuals than when marriage markets and weak and unemployment is high.

=== Intersection of class and gender ===
Social class interacts with gender to impact the male-female dynamic in marriage, particularly with respect to "temporal flexibility at work and home". Research shows that class-advantaged men and women use their class privilege and the flexibility it provides them in ways that support conventional gender roles. Conversely, men and women who do not have access to such flexibility and control of their time are pressured to weaken conventional gender expectations regarding marriage, family, and jobs. Gertsel and Clawson conducted a study in which they collected data from four groups of paid care workers, divided by class and gender (2014). The two class-advantaged groups were nurses and doctors. The nurses were almost exclusively women and the doctors were almost exclusively men. This group had a number of choices about work hours and their ability to utilize family-friendly workplace policies. The two class-disadvantaged groups were female nursing assistants (CNAs) and male emergency medical technicians (EMTs). The class-disadvantaged group had fewer choices regarding their work hours and faced greater constraints in flexibility and control of their time. Women in particular need flexible work hours in order to meet the inflexible demands that marriage and a family place upon them, as traditional gender expectations stipulate that the woman be the primary caregiver. The results of this study demonstrate that class, intersecting with gender, influences the ability of men and women to obtain and utilize flexibility with their time.

Furthermore, gender shapes the particular variety of flexibility demanded. In advantaged occupations, both men and women are able to acquire the flexibility they so desire. However, they choose to use the control that this affords them in different manners. Women cut back on paid work hours and take leaves to handle domestic labor and child-care. In other words, they make job sacrifices. On the other hand, men are less likely to utilize family-friendly policies to make work sacrifices; they spend less at home and more time working. In essence, both men and women of class-advantaged occupations use the flexibility that their status provides them to "enact neotraditional gender expectations".

Moreover, men also have a workplace advantage because employers portray fathers as more committed, productive, and responsible than men without children. Working-class men tend to emphasize bread-winning masculinity while middle-class men focus on the traditional gender-based division of labor. On average fathers spend about forty-three hours a week working for pay and eighteen hours per week on the house and kids. Ultimately, this comes out to fathers doing about two-thirds of the paid work and one-third of the unpaid work.

Class-disadvantaged men and women do not have the same temporal flexibility that allows them to make decisions on how to allocate their time. They face stricter constraints on their work hours and policies, thus making it impossible for them to choose whether to spend more time at work or more time at home. For example, even if a class-disadvantaged woman wanted to spend less time at work and more time with her children or in the home, she might not be able due to the inability to get time off from work or take a leave of absence.

Notably, five out of six mothers would join the workforce if they had sufficient child care while they were away from home. In America, the average cost of infant care is about $9,589 a year and childcare for young children under the age of four will cost about 64% of full-time minimum wage workers' earnings in one single year. For this reason, low-income families will save money by leaving one parent at home outside of the workforce to care for the children. Individuals who specialize in unpaid labor in the household may feel subordinated to the breadwinner because they feel they have minimal voice in their relationship or financial decisions. Additionally, women who take time out of the workforce to raise their young children will lose out on wages, benefits, and social security contributions. To illustrate this, mothers who take three or more years off of work for their family have about 37% decrease in income; this is also considered to be the "mommy tax". Of course, this is less noticeable among women who are married to breadwinners because they are willing to share their income and wealth with their stay-at-home spouse.

Thus, class-disadvantage makes it more difficult for both men and women to adhere to traditional gender expectations. The researchers showed that class advantage is used to "do gender" in traditional ways, while class disadvantage may lead to a violation of traditional gender expectations in a way that "undoes gender".Today there is a shift in gender roles, with twice as many stay-at-home fathers than there were two decades ago. Four out of five of the stay at home fathers report that they are only home due to disabilities, illness, education, unemployment or retirement. But race also plays a factor in employment for fathers. African American, Hispanic, Asian men and men with limited education are more likely to stay at home than white highly educated men.

=== Gender and work-family balance in marriage ===
Research indicates that three principal factors predict how well men and women perceive their work–life balance in marriage: job characteristics, family characteristics, and spillover between work and family. Job characteristics determine workers' freedom to balance multiple demands and obligations in their marriage. As demonstrated by Gertsel and Clawson, higher-level occupations are generally more accommodating to family life than are lower level occupations (2014). Furthermore, the number of hours worked and the work spillover into family life are the most telling predictors of perceived imbalance in marriage. Keene and Quadagno found a greater likelihood of perceived imbalance when work duties caused men or women to miss a family event or make it difficult to maintain their home (2004).

Additional research by Keene and Quadagno suggests that the gender expectations that men should prioritize their work lives and women should prioritize their marriage and home life no longer exist. However, there persists an unequal division of labor in the home between men and women. One theoretical approach to explain this concept is the "gender similarity" approach, which "predicts that the convergence in men's and women's work and family demands should lead to a convergence in attitudes toward work and family responsibilities and feelings of work-family balance". In contrast, the "gender differences" approach stipulates that "normative differences between men and women remain, with the family still primarily defined as women's sphere and paid work as men's domain". There is empirical evidence in support of both theories. Some research supports the convergence of men's and women's work experiences: both men and women make adjustments in their marriage and personal lives to meet their employer's expectations, while also making adjustments at work to maintain their marital and family obligations. However, the analysis from the abovementioned study supports the gender differences model. Gender differences exist in the division of household labor and chores, with men working more hours and women spending more time on domestic and child-care responsibilities.

On average mothers spend twenty-five hours a week working for pay and thirty-two hours doing unpaid work. The introduction of parenthood changes the gender division of labor between men and women both inside and outside the home. Dual-parent households allocate household work and paid work efficiently to maximize family income. As a result, women are left to specialize in unpaid household work because women are presumed to be more efficient at childcare and generally earn less than men in the labor force. Many women either minimize, shift or completely dismiss their initial career or education aspirations when anticipating parenthood. Consequently, this forces women into disadvantaged career opportunities and reasserts the gender labor market inequality.

== Divorce ==
=== Trends ===
The divorce rate in western countries has generally increased over time. Divorce rates have however started to decrease over the last twenty years. In the US, the divorce rate changed from 1.2 per 1000 marriages in 1860 to 3.0, 4.0, and 7.7 in 1890, 1900, 1920. The rate has since declined, to 5.3, 4.7, 4.1, and 3.7 per 1000 marriages in 1979, 1990, 2000, and 2004 respectively. The divorce rate in the United States fell 21 percent from 2008 to 2017, as people married at later ages and higher levels of education.

The following are several possible causes for the modern increase in rate of divorce:

- Individualism: In today's society, families spend more time apart than they do together. Some individuals in a family focus more on personal happiness and earning income to support their family that it consumes the time actually spent with their family.
- Feelings are no longer mutual: Many people end marriages because their sexual needs are no longer satisfied or merely because they have lost feelings for one another. This often happens when one partner finds a more exciting relationship and chooses to move forward with that new relationship. In some cases, a partner may even commit adultery which also may result in a divorce as a partner discovers their partner being unfaithful to them.
- Women have become more independent: Now that women have equal rights and have proven over time that they have the potential and ability to support themselves, women find it much easier to leave unhappy marriages. They are also more work-focused, thus giving them less time to cope with their relationships.
- Stress: Stress is a big factor in marriages. Working to support a family, while trying to stabilize finances is a big factor in stress. Also, both partners working (in most cases) leaves less "family time", which makes raising children difficult. This often happens in the stage where couples are raising young children.
- Socially acceptable: In today's generation, divorce is now more socially acceptable. Now, instead of discouraging a divorce in an unsatisfying relationship, it is more widely accepted and sometimes even encouraged. Not only is it now more acceptable, but it is also easier to get a divorce legally than it was in previous years.

=== Parents: Falling out of love ===
Many scholars have attempted to explain why humans enter relationships, stay in relationships and end relationships. Levinger's (1965, 1976) theory on divorce is based on a theoretical tradition consisting of three basic components: attractions, barriers and alternatives. Attraction in this theory is proportional to the rewards one gets from the relationship minus the cost of the relationship. All the things that can be seen as gains from the relationship such as love, sex, companionship, emotional support and daily assistance are the rewards of the relationship. The costs would be the negative aspects of the relationship such as domestic violence, infidelity, quarrels and limitations on personal freedom. Generally people tend to stay in high-reward and low-cost relationships. However, the reverse situation, that is, a costly marriage with few benefits does not automatically lead to divorce. Couples must overcome barriers such as religious beliefs, social stigma, and financial dependence or law restrictions before they successfully dissolve their marriage.

Another theory to explain why relationships end is the "mate ejection theory", by Brian Boutwell, J. C. Barnes and K. M Beaver. The mate ejection theory looks at the dissolution of marriage from an evolutionary point of view, where all species seek to successfully reproduce. According to this theory there are gender differences in the process of ejection. For example, a woman will be more upset when her husband emotionally cheats on her and a man will be more upset when his wife physically cheats on him. The reason for this stems from evolutionary roots: a man emotionally cheating on his wife equates to a loss or reduction in resources for the wife to raise the children whereas an act of physical infidelity by the wife threatens the husband's chance to pass on his genes to the next generation via reproduction. Both these circumstances call for mate ejection. "Ancestral conditions that favored the dissolution of a mateship constituted a recurrent adaptive problem over human evolutionary history and thus imposed selection pressures for the evolution of strategic solutions." Put differently, the capability of emancipating themselves from certain relationships could have conferred a fitness benefit for ancestral humans.

=== Effect of divorce on children ===
Three longitudinal studies on divorce: The Marin County Project (the clinical study of 60 families that began in 1971), The Virginia County Study (a series of longitudinal studies on marriage, divorce and remarriage) and The Binuclear Family Studies of 98 families have helped expand the literature on divorce. The Binuclear study was based on the findings from the Marin County Project and Virginia County Study. This research has been used to understand the implications of divorce on children later on in life.

Judith Wallerstein's research on the effect of divorce on children (based on the Marin County Project) suggests that, "children with divorced parents often reach adulthood as psychologically troubled individuals who find it difficult to maintain satisfying relationships with others". Quantitative research done by other scholars supports Wallerstein's conclusion. It has been shown that children with divorced parents have an increased risk of: experiencing psychological problems, having troubled marriages, divorcing and having poor relationships with parents especially the father. Wallerstein, however, has a disputed an "extreme version" of her theory where she claims that the difference between the children with divorced and continuously married parents is dramatic and pervasive.

One opponent of Wallerstein's conclusions is Mavis Hetherington, who argues that the negative effects of divorce on children have been exaggerated and that most children grow up without long-term harm. Hetherington's data showed that 25% of children with divorced parents reach adulthood with a serious social, emotional or psychological problem, compared to 10% of children with continuously married parents. 75% of the children grow up to be well-functioning adults.

Twenty years after the 98 families from the binuclear study were interviewed, 85% of the offspring from these families were interviewed. Of those, 23% had completed postgraduate training, 33% had completed college, 31% had completed post-secondary training, 10% had received their high school diplomas and the majority (85%) of the interviewed children were employed.

== Effects of technology ==
In the past few decades, technology has drastically advanced, and with it, so has its effect on society. Dr. Schoppe-Sullivan studied the effects technology, particularly social media, had on parents and the way they raise their children. She studied approximately 200 dual-income families who had their first child between 2008 and 2009, observing how social media pressured them in their roles as parents. What she found was an increased level in confidence from the fathers and the opposite effect in mothers; fathers felt more confident after viewing other parents on social media, while mothers were worried after viewing posts depicting ideal or perfect family photos or concerned with the comments they would receive on their posts from others criticizing their parenting. This led directly into increased levels of stress and lower confidence, which affected the children's reactions to their parents, altering the behavior of the children.

== Sociology of motherhood ==
=== Contemporary theories surrounding motherhood ===
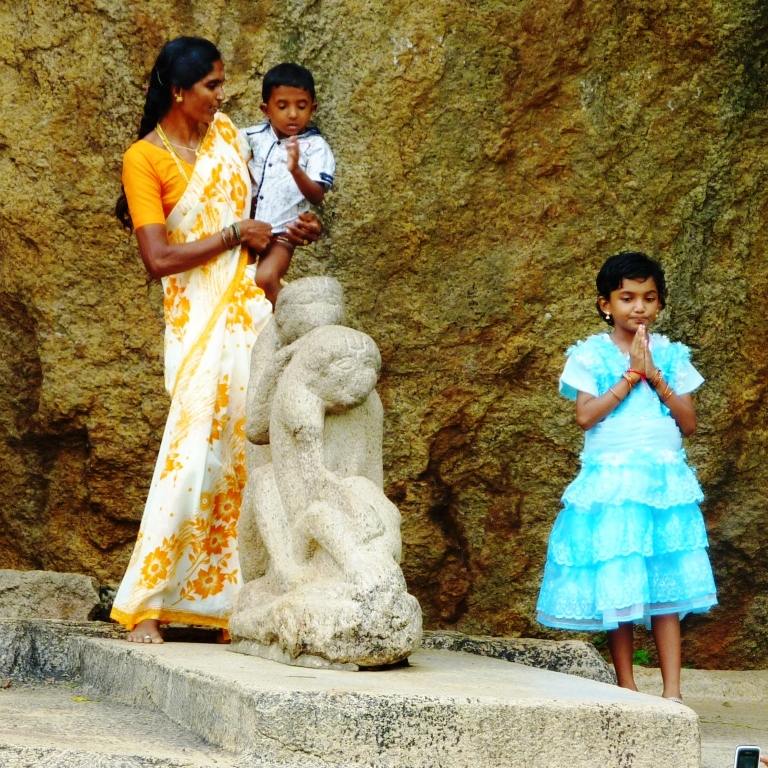
Mother and children, Mahabalipuram

Mothering is the social practice of nurturing and caring for dependent children. It is a dynamic process of social interactions and relationships. Mothering is typically associated with women since it is typically women who mother their children. However, "not all women mother, and mothering as nurturing and caring work is not inevitable the exclusive domain of women". Some argue that mothering as a female role is a social construction that is highly influenced by gender belief systems. The roles associated with motherhood are variable across time and culture.

==== Universalist approach ====
The universalist approach to motherhood is aimed at conceptualizing the work that mothers do. This approach identifies mothers through what they do, rather than how they feel. Mothers share a set of activities known as "maternal practice" that are universal, even though they vary as individuals and across cultures. These activities include nurturing, protecting, and training their children. An individual's mothering actions are shaped by their beliefs about family, individuality, the nature of childhood, and the nature of their child. These are also often shaped by their own childhood and past experiences with children. The dynamic interactions between the mother and child create deep and meaningful connections.

==== Particularistic approach ====
The particularistic approach to mothering suggests that the role of a mother, their activities, and understandings cannot be separated from the context in which they live. According to this theory, mothering takes place within "specific historical contexts framed by interlocking structures of race, class, and gender" Furthermore, a mother's strategies and meanings that she develops are influenced by different social locations, such as the intersections of regional and local political economy with class, ethnicity, culture, and sexual preference.

=== Conventional notions of motherhood ===
Motherhood ideology is influenced by the idealization of the family structure and perpetuates the image of a heterosexual couple with children. Some sociologists refer to this as the "bourgeois family", which arose out of typical 16th- and 17th-century European households and is often considered the "traditional Western" structure. In this family model the father acts as the economic support and sometimes disciplinarian of the family, while the mother or other female relative oversees most of the child-rearing.

In East Asian and Western traditional families, fathers were the heads of the families, which meant that his duties included providing financial support and making critical decisions, some of which must have been obeyed without question by the rest of the family members. "Some Asian American men are brought up under stringent gender role expectations such as a focus on group harmony and filial piety, carrying on their family name and conforming to the expectations of the parents."

The mother's role in the family is celebrated on Mother's Day. Ann Jarvis originally organized Mother's Work Day, protesting the lack of cleanliness and sanitation in the workplace. Jarvis died in 1905 and her daughter created a National Mother's Day to honor her mother. Mothers frequently have a very important role in raising offspring and the title can be given to a non-biological mother that fills this role. This is common in stepmothers.

=== Deviancy discourses ===
There are many cultural contradictions and diverse arrangements and practices that challenge the intensive mothering ideology. However, they are considered deviant discourses since they do not conform to the script of full-time motherhood in the context of marriage. These include single mothers, welfare mothers, minority mothers, immigrant mothers, and lesbian mothers. These types of motherhood categories are not mutually exclusive. Furthermore, women who cannot or choose not to be mothers deal with many internal and external pressures.

=== Motherhood statistics ===
In the United States, 82.5 million women are mothers of all ages, while the national average age of first child births is 25.1 years. In 2008, 10% of births were to teenage girls, and 14% were to women ages 35 and older. In the United States, a study found that the average woman spends 5 years working and building a career before having children, and mothers working non-salary jobs began having children at age 27, compared to mothers with salary positions, who became pregnant at age 31. The study shows that the difference in age of child birth is related to education, since the longer a woman has been in school, the older she will be when she enters the workforce.

== Sociology of fatherhood ==
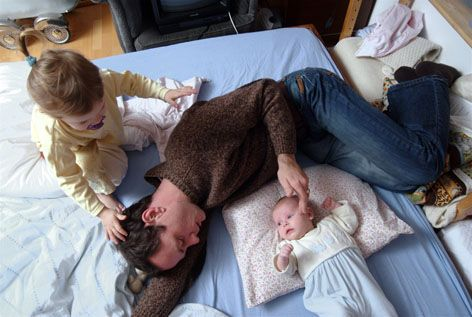
Father with his two daughters in relationship

According to anthropologist Maurice Godelier, a critical novelty in human society, compared to humans' closest biological relatives (chimpanzees and bonobos) which are unaware of paternity, is the parental role assumed by men.

In many cultures, especially traditional western, a father is usually the husband in a married couple. Many times fathers have a very important role in raising offspring and the title can be given to a non-biological father that fills this role. This is common in stepfathers (males married to biological mothers). In East Asian and Western traditional families, fathers are the heads of the families, which means that their duties include providing financial support and making critical decisions, some of which must be obeyed without question by the rest of the family members.

As with cultural concepts of family, the specifics of a father's role vary according to cultural folkways. In what some sociologists term the "bourgeois family", which arose out of typical 16th- and 17th-century European households, the father's role has been somewhat limited. In this family model the father acts as the economic support and sometimes disciplinarian of the family, while the mother or other female relative oversees most of the child-rearing. This structure is enforced, for example, in societies which legislate maternity leave but do not have a corresponding paternity leave.

However, this limited role has increasingly been called into question. Since the 1950s, social scientists as well as feminists have increasingly criticized gendered arrangements of work and care, and the male breadwinner role, and policies are increasingly targeting men as fathers, as a tool of changing gender relations.

=== Science of parenting ===
Described as 'the science of male parenting', the study of 'father craft' emerged principally in Britain and the United States (but also throughout Europe) in the 1920s. "Male adjuncts to Maternity and Infant Welfare Centers – reacted to the maternal dominance in infant welfare and parenting in interwar Britain by arguing that fathers should play a crucial role in the upbringing of children." Were such a study to be conducted into the science of female parenting, it would be called mother craft.

The words mama and mom, usually regarded as terms of endearment directed towards a mother figure, are generally one of the first words a child speaks. While dada or dad often precedes it, this does not reflect a stronger bond between the father and child than that of the mother and child. Mama and mom are merely simpler to pronounce than dada or dad, as /m/ typically occurs earlier in phonological development. Children tend to remember daddy more because, according to research, they are more exciting to the child.

=== Contemporary theories ===
A number of studies have been given to the American public to determine how men view and define fatherhood. Specifically, studies have focused on why men choose to become fathers and the relationship between fatherhood and contemporary masculinity. Not surprisingly, recent research on fatherhood is framed by identity theory and has focused on the salience, centrality, and importance of the father identity in men's lives, especially as it may be linked to men's involvement with their children. According to identity theory, the more salient and central the identity, the more likely individuals are to engage in behaviors associated with it. Salience refers to the readiness to act out an identity in a particular situation. Centrality refers to the importance of an identity in relation to other identities. The centrality of the father identity is usually held at a higher level (as opposed to brother, husband, etc.) due to the gendered expectation that men must be "good" fathers. Men who view their role as a father central and crucial to who they are as a person are more likely to engage with their children and strive to participate in responsible fatherhood. Men who fail to successfully become fathers or are unable to have children view the lack of fatherhood as a threat to their masculinity. As a result, the threat to masculinity serves as a driving force for men to possibly become fathers because they never want to be seen as infertile or effeminate.

=== Men who do not choose fatherhood ===
Studies on men who choose not to be fathers often focus on how the role of fatherhood is crucial to masculinity and a man's central identity. Many men blame economic difficulties, cultural differences, and life situations as potential factors that deter them from fatherhood.

Economic difficulties, see economic problem, serve as a primary explanation for men to avoid fatherhood. For men, it is difficult to separate occupational success from fatherhood because financially providing for one's family has been central to the identity of being a father in the United States. As a result, a complex relationship is formed between economic struggles and the importance of fatherhood. Men who are not employed or have low earnings often feel as if they have failed as both fathers and men. On the other hand, men who have a low socioeconomic status find fatherhood very appealing because it gives them a measure of accomplishment denied to them by the occupational world.

In terms of the cultural importance of fatherhood, white men and men of color have differing views on fatherhood that can affect how many of these men participate in fatherhood.

Lastly, some men blame life situations as the primary factor for their decision not to pursue fatherhood. Life situations are defined as an individual's relationship status (single or married) and their age. Studies have shown that men who are older and married tend to be more likely to pursue fatherhood. It has been proposed that men continue to view marriage, work and fatherhood as a "package deal" meaning that lacking one of these components, like work or marriage, may result in the decision not to have children.

It has also been proposed that married men feel as if they are expected to pursue fatherhood as a part of their marriage though they personally may not want to have children. On the other hand, men who are single and younger do not feel the same desire because they are not "prepared" to emotionally and financially support a child.

== Alternate family forms ==
The number of married couples raising children has decreased over the years. In Canada, married and common-law couples with children under the age of 25 represented 44% of all families in 2001. This statistic has lowered since 1991, when married and common-law couples raising children under the age of 25 represented 49 percent of all Canadian families. There are various family forms which are becoming increasingly popular in society.

=== Single-parent families ===
In Canada, one-parent families have become popular since 1961 when only 8.4 percent of children were being raised by a single parent. In 2001, 15.6 percent of children were being raised by a single parent. The number of single-parent families continue to rise, while it is four times more likely that the mother is the parent raising the child. The high percentage of mothers becoming the sole parent is sometimes due to the result of a divorce, unplanned pregnancy or the inability to find a befitting partner..

=== Cohabitation ===
A residence containing an unmarried couple is called cohabitation. This type of family style is becoming increasingly accepted in Canada and has increased from 8% in 1981 to 16.4% in 2001. In the last few decades, living with one's significant other has become normalized in society. Cohabitation has drastically increased in the United States within the last 50 years, increasing by nearly 900 percent. Data from a 2012 Census showed that 7.8 million couples are living together without first getting married, compared to 2.9 million in 1996. And two-thirds of couples married in 2012 shared a home together for more than two years before their marriage.

=== Gay and lesbian couples ===
Gay and lesbian couples are categorized as same-sex relationships. In 1989, Denmark was the first nation to allow same-sex couples to marry and to provide equal rights to all citizens. Many nations began to allow same-sex marriages, such as Canada and Spain (2005). A United States Supreme Court ruling mandated that same-sex marriage is constitutional and therefore allowed in all 50 states in the United States (2015).

=== Child-rearing by same-sex couples ===
Children of same-sex couples either come from past relationships or through other opportunities like adoption or artificial insemination. From the data collected in the 2000 U.S. Census, it was suggested that more than 250,000 children in the United States were being raised by lesbian and gay couples. In the 2010 U.S. Census, it was reported that 20% of lesbian and gay couple or partnership households are raising children (115,064 out of 594,000 same-sex households). The trend of child-rearing amongst gay and lesbian couples or partnerships is on the rise.

Support from the general public for gay and lesbian couples or partnerships to raise children is at an all-time high since the 1990s. In 1994, the idea of homosexual partnerships parenting children was evenly divided among Americans. When Americans were asked, "Do you think homosexual couples should or should not have the legal right to adopt a child", 28% of Americans said they should, and 65% said they should not. In 2003, the idea of homosexual partnerships parenting children evenly divided Americans for support. When Americans were asked the same question about the rights of homosexual partnerships to adopt, 49% of Americans said they should, and 48% said they should not. In 2014, Americans were asked a very similar question, and 63% of Americans said lesbian and gay couples or partnerships should have the right to adopt, and 35% said they should not.

There are no federal laws in the United States prohibiting the adoption of a child by a homosexual couple or partnership. Some states, such as Florida, base same-sex adoption on the opinions of the county judge in charge of the case, and county judges base their decisions on the best interest of the child. The central argument in the debate for legal rights, policies and overall support is related to the idea of same-sex couples raising children is the well-being of children raised in those families. There are concerns like about the mental, emotional and even the social development of children who are raised in same-sex couple or partnership households. Much research has been conducted providing insight into a range of issues, including the personal development, gender development, peer relationships, and family relationships of children with same-sex parents.

Research suggests that sexual identities (including gender identity, gender-role behavior, and sexual orientation) develop in much the same ways among children of lesbian mothers as they do among children of heterosexual parents. Evidence also suggests that children of lesbian and gay parents have normal social relationships with peers and adults. There have also been studies of other aspects of personal development (including personality, self-concept, and conduct) that similarly reveal few differences between children of lesbian mothers and children of heterosexual parents. These differences are not significant but are noticeable. For example, there was a study that examined and compared particular behaviors and ideas/belief performed by sons and daughters of lesbian mothers. Studies found that 53% of the daughters of lesbian mothers aspired to pursue careers as physicians, attorneys, and engineers compared with only 21% of the daughters of heterosexual mothers. The sons of lesbian mothers also tended to be less aggressive and more nurturing than the sons of heterosexual mothers. "Children who grow up with one or two gay and/or lesbian parents fare as well in emotional, cognitive, social, and sexual functioning as do children whose parents are heterosexual. Children's optimal development seems to be influenced more by the nature of the relationships and interactions within the family unit than by the particular structural form it takes."

=== Chosen or fictive kin ===
Others who are not related by blood or marriage, but have a significant emotional relationship are variously called fictive kin, chosen kin, or voluntary kin: for example, a close family friend that one would refer to as an aunt or uncle, but shares no genetic or marital relationship.

== Sociology of childhood ==
The values learned during childhood are important in the development and socialization of children. The family is considered to be the agency of primary socialisation and the first focal socialisation agency.

=== History ===
Since the 2000s, a new subfield, sociology of childhood, has gained increasing attention and triggered numerous empirical studies as well as intensive theoretical disputes, starting in the Scandinavian and the English-speaking countries. A different approach was adopted in Europe and the United States, with European sociologists more interested in actively promoting children's rights. Up to this time, sociology had approached children and childhood mainly from a socialization perspective, and the emergence of the new childhood sociological paradigm ran parallel to the feminist critique of sociological traditions. Childhood sociologists attacked the "adultocentric" approach and the "separative view" of sociology towards children. Not surprisingly, then, the key works in the sociology of childhood are quite interdisciplinary, linking history, cultural studies, ethnomethodology, and pedagogy. Key texts include James and Prout's Constructing and Reconstructing Childhood (1990/1997), James, Jenks and Prout Theorizing Childhood (1998) and Prout's The Future of Childhood (2005). On methodological issues in research with children see Research with Children, edited by Christensen and James (2008).

=== Trends ===
The current sociology of childhood is organized around three central discussions:

The child as a social actor: This approach derives from youth sociology as well as ethnography. Focusing on everyday life and the ways children orient themselves in society, it engages with the cultural performances and the social worlds they construct and take part in. Theory and research methodology approach children as active participants and members of society right from the beginning. Thus they are neither analyzed as outsiders to society nor as merely 'emergent' members of society. Therefore, the sociology of childhood distinguishes itself from the established concepts of socialisation research and developmental psychology of the last decades.

The generational order: The second approach centers on socio-structural and socio-theoretical questions concerning social equality and social order in a society, which categorizes their members by age and segregates them in many respects (rights, deeds, economical participation, ascribed needs etc.). These issues can be summarized under the overall concept of the generational order. Thus the categorization of societal members by age is far from being an innocent representation of natural distinctions, but rather a social construction of such a "natural truth". It is, therefore, a relevant component of social order and deeply connected to other dimensions of social inequality. Social and economic changes and socio-political interventions thus become central topics in childhood sociology. The analysis of these issues has increased awareness of the generational inequality of societies.

The hybridity of childhood: This discussion is more critical (though not dismissive) of the social constructionist approaches that have dominated the sociology of childhood since the 1990s. More open to materialist perspectives, it seeks an interdisciplinary path that recognizes the biological as well as the social and cultural shaping of childhood and holds open the possibility of an interdisciplinary Childhood Studies emergent from current multi-disciplinary efforts. This scholarship has two important influences. Firstly, a so-called 'new wave' of childhood studies, heavily influenced by Alan Prout's (2005) seminal book The Future of Childhood. In this work, Prout examines how childhoods are not merely constructed socially – via discourses, laws or institutions – but materially, through toys, food and medicines. Since then, sociologists such as Nick Lee have offered important analyses of the ways in which the 'entanglements' between children and non-human materialities and technologies have become ever-more important to the governance and regulation of children's lives, through what he terms the 'biopoliticisation' of childhood. Secondly, nonrepresentational approaches to children's geographies have offered a commensurate and (arguably) broader series of approaches that move beyond social constructivism. Scholars such as Peter Kraftl, John Horton and Affrica Taylor have been particularly influential in examining how childhoods are produced and experienced through complex intersections of emotion, affect, embodiment and materiality. Somewhat problematically, there has been relatively little overlap between these two strands of scholarship, despite their sharing common conceptual foundations in the work of post-structuralism, new materialism and posthumanism. Nevertheless, during the mid-2010s, a so-called 'spatial turn' in childhood and education studies saw increasing cross-fertilisation between these fields and the take-up of children's geographers' work by sociologists and others. Therefore, the prospects for cross-disciplinary scholarship around hybridity, spatiality and a 'new wave' remain very promising – perhaps most evident in a recent volume by Julie Seymour, Abigail Hackett and Lisa Procter.

=== Gender and childhood ===
There has been much research and discussion about the effects of society on the assumption of gender roles in childhood, and how societal norms perpetuate gender-differentiated interactions with children. Psychologists and sociologists suggest that self-gender identity is a result of social learning from peers, role-modeling within the family unit, and genetic predisposition. The sociological implications are as follows:

Peer interactions:

There are significant gender differences in the relationship styles among children which particularly begin to emerge after early childhood and at the onset of middle childhood around age six and grow more prevalent with age. Boys tend to play in larger groups than girls, and friends of boys are more likely to become friends with each other which, in turn leads to more density in social networks among boys. Boys also have more well-defined dominance hierarchies than girls within their peer groups. In terms of dyadic relationships, girls are more likely to have longer-lasting relationships of this nature, but no literature suggests that girls engage in more dyadic relationships than boys. Girls are also more prosocial in conflict situations and are better at collaborative work and play than boys. They also spend more time in social conversations than boys and are more likely to self-disclose among their peers than boys. On the other hand, boys are more likely than girls to engage in organized play such as sports and activities with well-defined rules. One theory suggests that because of this, boys have more opportunities to exhibit their strength and skill and compare theirs to that of their peers during these competitive activities. Girls' peer groups are characterized by strong interpersonal relations, empathy for others, and working towards connection-oriented goals, while boys focus more on asserting their own dominance in the peer group and agenda-oriented goals.

Significant social differences also exist between boys and girls when experiencing and dealing with social stress. Boys experience more social stress among their peers than girls in the form of verbal and physical abuse, but girls experience more social stress through strains in their friendships and social networks. To deal with social stress, girls do more support-seeking, express more emotions to their friends, and ruminate more than boys. Boys use humor as a distraction from stress and seek less emotional support within their friendships and social networks.

Family interactions:

Overall, the literature implies that the biological gender of children affects how parents interact with them. Differentials in interaction range from the amount of time spent with children to how much parents invest financially in their children's futures. On average, fathers tend to exhibit more differential treatment than mothers, and fathers tend to be more invested in families with sons than families with daughters in terms of both time and money. However, the association of gender with father investment has been weakening over the years, and the differentials are not large. Parents tend to enroll their daughters in more cultural activities than their sons (e.g. art classes, dance classes, and musical instrument lessons), and tend to be more invested in school-related parent involvement programs for their sons than their daughters.

Sons and daughters are not only treated differently by their parents based on gender, but also receive different benefits from their parents based on gender. Parents, both fathers and mothers, may be less invested in their daughters' higher education than their sons' and tend to save more money on average in anticipation for their sons' enrollment in educational institutions after high school graduation. However, this may not lead to more academic or work success for sons later in life. Parents are also more likely to underestimate daughters' abilities in math and science while overestimating that of sons. Daughters also, on average, also do more housework than sons, which reflects gendered divisions in the workplace and household in society.

Sibling relations, unlike parental relations, show no consensus in the literature about being gender-differentiated in interactions and benefits. However, sex-minority siblings may have more difficulty receiving necessary sex-specific treatment from parents.

=== Current tasks ===
Questions about socialization practices and institutions remain central in childhood research. But, they are being dealt with in a new, more sociological way. To analyze socialization processes means, therefore, to reconstruct the historically and culturally varying conceptions, processes and institutions of disciplining and civilization of the offspring. In addition, the strategies of habitus formation and the practices of status (re-)production are considered. The sociology of social inequality and the sociology of the family and private life are, therefore, important fields for childhood sociologists. Children's own action, their resistance, cooperation, and collective action among peers has to be taken into account. Meanwhile, widespread anthropological assumptions concerning a universal human nature, based on a view of individual and society as opposed to each other, should be omitted from the conceptual repertoire of sociological childhood research. They are the legacy of the older socialization approach and they legitimate some forms of childhood and education practices as indispensable and even as a "natural" requirement of society, while devaluing others. In this way they generally legitimate western middle class childhood and mask inequality and the interests of social order.

== Journals ==
- Family Matters by Australian Institute of Family Studies, ISSN 1030-2646
- International Journal of Sociology of the Family
- Journal of Family History
- Journal of Marriage and Family
- Journal of Family Issues

== See also ==
- Child abuse
- Domestic violence
- Extended family
- Family economics
- Family law
- Fathers' rights movement
- Feminist movement
- Hypergamy
- Inequality within immigrant families in the United States
- Masculism
- Men's health
- Men's movement
- Men's rights movement
- Men's studies
- Mothers' rights
- Nuclear family
- Othermother
- Paternity fraud
- Scientific motherhood
- WAVE Trust
- Women's health
- Women's studies
- Work–family balance in the United States
- Youth studies
