= Stay-at-home dad =

Father who is the main caregiver of his children

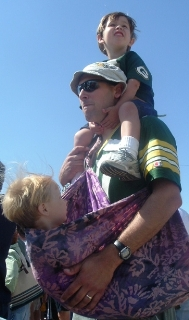
A stay-at-home dad taking care of children in the American Midwest c. 2004

A stay-at-home dad (Note: Abbreviated as SAHD. Also known as a full-time father, stay-at-home father, house dad, or househusband.) is a father who is the main caregiver of the children and is generally the homemaker of the household. The female equivalent is the stay-at-home mom or housewife. As families have evolved, the practice of being a stay-at-home dad has become more common and socially acceptable. Pre-industrialization, the family worked together as a unit and was self-sufficient. When affection-based marriages emerged in the 1830s, parents began devoting more attention to children and family relationships became more open. Beginning with the Industrial Revolution, mass production replaced the manufacturing of home goods; this shift dictated that the man become the breadwinner and the mother the caregiver of their children.

In the late 20th century, the number of stay-at-home dads began gradually increasing especially in developed Western nations. The role of househusband became more socially acceptable by the 2000s, though the role is subject to many stereotypes, and men may have difficulties accessing parenting benefits, communities, and services targeted at mothers. A 2014 report released by the Pew Research Center found two million men to be stay-at-home dads in the United States. The stay-at-home dad was more regularly portrayed in the media by the 2000s, especially in the US.

== Evolution of family roles ==
=== Pre-industrialization ===
In the colonial United States, the nuclear family was the most common family form. Typical families consisted of five or more children initially; because of high infant mortality rates, only a few children survived adolescence. Colonial families existed to serve six main functions: self-sufficient business, school, vocational institute, church, house of correction, and welfare institution.

The first African Americans to reach America were initially brought over as indentured servants, but instead became slaves. By the 19th century, slave trading was a thriving business. Typical slave families consisted of one or two children. Women were primarily the head of the families, either because the fathers had died or had been separated from the family.

=== Industrialization (1800–1900) ===
The Industrial Revolution led to extensive mechanization, resulting in a shift from home manufacturing to large-scale factory production. As this rapid transition took place, families lost many of their production functions. Instead, family members had to work outside the home to support their families. As a result, husbands and wives began operating in separate spheres of activity. The husband became the "breadwinner" by going out and working, while the wife stayed home and took care of the family.

=== Transition to modern family (1900–present) ===
The modern family is commonly thought to have originated in the 1830s: courtship became more open, marriages were often based on affection, and parents devoted more attention to children. At the beginning of the 20th century, married couples began to emphasize the importance of sexual attraction and compatibility in their relationships. This led to more intimate and open relationships along with more adolescent freedom. The transition of the family was influenced by the Great Depression, which forced many women into the workplace in order to compensate for lack of financial stability. In 1932, a federal executive order stated that only one spouse could work for the federal government. This resulted in many women being forced to resign allowing their husbands to continue working.

World War II had a significant impact on changing family roles. Because of the draft, workers were scarce in many industries and employers began to fill jobs with women, mainly in nontraditional positions. This increase in working women became one of the few times in history where women were praised for work outside the home. Divorce rates also reached a new high during this period. Not only had many women found a new sense of independence, but cultural shifts were underway, including the rise of feminism and the development of reliable methods of birth control. Such changes caused some women to decide to end their unhappy marriages.

The 1950s saw a "baby boom" in America. This period was also called the "Golden '50s". This was credited to families trying to make up lost time after the war. As a result, many families moved to the suburbs instead of residing in the city, the number of two-income families began to increase, and grown children began to remain at home longer because of financial difficulties. Gradually, women began re-entering the workforce. This progression away from the traditional view of the woman as the homemaker led to the creation of the role of the stay-at-home dad.

== Increase in popularity in the 21st century ==
Stay-at-home dads have been seen in increasing numbers in Western culture, especially in Canada, the UK, and the United States since the late 20th century. In developed East Asian nations such as Japan and South Korea, this practice is less common.

There are several reasons why some families feel that it would be more beneficial for the father to be the primary caregiver while the mother works outside the home. The decision to use a stay-at-home dad arrangement is most commonly due to economic reasons. At the same time, women are progressing into higher-paying jobs. There are now financial ramifications in deciding whether the mother or father should become the stay-at-home parent. In cases where the woman is the higher-paid parent, it makes more economic sense for her to continue to work while the man takes on the caregiver role. It also makes sense at times the mother's job offers health benefits for the family whereas the father's does not. It has also been shown that if the "pregnancy was jointly planned", the father is more likely to be involved.

Many men are also remote workers. In this regard, they contribute financially to the family while also acting as the primary caregiver of the family's children. Differences in parents' schedules can also account for some of the stay-at-home dads. Sometimes the father works odd work shifts while the mother has a typical nine-to-five work schedule.

Fixed gender roles began to become less prominent in the Western world starting in the late 20th century, allowing men to make their own choice of career without regard to traditional gender-based roles. Some men who choose this role may do so because they enjoy being an active part of their children's lives, while in other families, the mother wants to pursue her career. For example, of the 187 participants at Fortune magazine's Most Powerful Women in the Business Summit, one-third of the women's husbands were stay-at-home dads. Families vary widely in terms of how household chores are divided. Some retired males who marry a younger woman decide to become stay-at-home dads while their wives work because they want a "second chance" to watch a child grow up in a second or third marriage. Additionally, more career and lifestyle options are accepted and prevalent in Western society. There are also fewer restrictions on what constitutes a family.

== Disadvantages ==
Depending on the country or region, a stay-at-home dad might find more or less social support for his decision. In regions where traditional roles prevail, a stay-at-home dad might be shunned by stay-at-home moms' peer groups. In order to find support for their choice, these men have created and joined many support networks.

Still, many men struggle to find acceptance within the role of stay-at-home dad despite the many gains that have been made. Many worry about losing business skills and their "professional place in line". There is a common misconception that stay-at-home dads cannot get a job and therefore must rewrite the typical family roles, forcing the wife into the workforce.

One 2002 study by the American Heart Association suggested stay-at-home dads may face a higher risk of heart disease. The reasons for the health risk are not specified.

The role of stay-at-home dad may be difficult for men who feel as though they had no option. It is hard for these men to adapt from being a financial provider in the family to being a homemaker. Men who willingly choose to become a stay-at-home dad are much more satisfied with their role in the family.

== Advantages ==
=== For the child ===
There have been many studies done which suggest the importance of the paternal role in a child's life and benefits of the stay-at-home dad. Children respond differently to males and females at birth.

A study conducted by a United States child psychiatrist, Kyle D. Pruett, found that infants between 7 and 30 months responded more favourably to being picked up by their fathers. Pruett also found that a father's parenting style is beneficial for a child's physical, cognitive, emotional and behavioural development. Mothers reassure toddlers when they become frustrated, while fathers encourage them to manage their frustration. This helps the children learn to deal with stress and frustration. A long-term study Pruett conducted proved that a father's active involvement with his children, from birth to adolescence, promotes greater emotional balance, stronger curiosity and a stronger sense of self-assurance in the child.

Additional studies show that during the first five years of a child's life, the father's role is more influential than the mother's in how the child learns to manage his or her body, navigate social circumstances, and play. Furthermore, a 1996 study by McGill University found that the "single most important childhood factor in developing empathy is paternal involvement in childcare". Children that have a strong paternal influence have more nurturing abilities. It has been researched in The Role of the Father in Child Development, that in general, children with stay-at-home dads develop attachments at infancy. The study further concluded that fathers who spent time alone bonding with their children more than twice per week brought up the most compassionate adults.

Robert Frank, a professor of child development at Oakton Community College in Illinois, conducted a study comparing households with a stay-at-home dad and households with a stay-at-home mom. His study concluded that women were still able to form a strong bond with their children despite working full-time outside the home. Also, women working full-time were often more engaged with their children on a day-to-day basis than their male counterparts. His study concluded that in a family with a stay-at-home dad arrangement, the maternal and paternal influences are equally strong. This contrasts with the more traditional family structure where the father works outside the home and the mother stays home with the children. In this type of arrangement, the mother's influence is extremely strong, whereas the father's is relatively small. The study found that both parents play an equal role in a child's development, but the stay-at-home dad arrangement is the most beneficial for the child.

=== For the mother ===
The stay-at-home dad arrangement allows the mother to work without having to use a daycare or a nanny. This arrangement prevents the mother from having to deal with the stress of finding acceptable childcare, checking backgrounds, and paying for care. This arrangement also can help ensure that the family's values are being upheld and instilled in the children. Free from the stress of childcare, the working mother is able to actively pursue their career. This allows for a more relaxed working environment for the mother and allows her to focus on her career. If the mother has a higher-paying job, this extra income will allow for savings to be made for the children; these savings could help the mother later on pay for university for the child or children. Thus, she can advance her career and provide more money for the family. It puts a sound mind for the mother knowing that the child/children are at a safe place with the father having the same safety and values as the mother. These are the same advantages for the father from having a stay-at-home mom arrangement.

=== For the father ===
A survey conducted by Minnesota's Department for Families and Children's Services shows that men consider childcare to be far more important than a paycheck. Of 600 dads surveyed, a majority said their most important role was to "show love and affection" to kids. "Safety and protection" came next, followed by "moral guidance", "taking time to play", and "teaching and encouraging". "Financial care" finished last. Many men are now becoming more involved in their children's lives, and, because of that, many men now have a better understanding of what life is like for their child growing up in modern society.

== Prevalence ==
=== Australia ===
Stay-at-home dads have been gradually increasing in Australia since the 1980s, with 80,000 recorded in 2016. In 2003, 91 percent of fathers with children aged under 15 years were employed, with 85 percent employed full-time. Because of this, there are few role models or resources that can help Australian fathers with the stay-at-home dad role. The Australian Bureau of Statistics show that approximately 7 percent of two-parent families with children under the age of 14 have a father who is unemployed and a mother who works full-time. Stay-at-home dads in Australia have almost doubled over the past decade—from 57,900 to 106,000—and is expected to increase in the future. Recent sociological studies have shown that men are dedicating more time and support to their children in comparison to the 19th century. Until recently, the idea of a stay-at-home dad was far from mainstream; however, the rising demand for female work has influenced this statistic to rise.

=== Canada ===
Over a 20-year period during the late 20th century, there was an increase in the number of women in the workforce in Canada. This shift increased father participation in family tasks that used to primarily be the responsibility of the mother. Beginning in the late 20th century, parental roles began to become less traditional, and the stay-at-home dad arrangement began to become more common. The number of stay-at-home dads increased by three percent points between 1976 and 1998, and the average age of a stay-at-home dad in Canada is 42. A bill was passed in by the Canadian government in October 1990 which granted paid leave for fathers for the purpose of primary caregiving. According to Statscan, in 1976, stay-at-home fathers accounted for approximately 1 in 70 of all Canadian families with a stay-at-home parent. By 2015, the proportion had risen to about 1 in 10. Stay-at-home fathers were on average older (45 years old) than fathers in single-earner families (40 years old) and dual-earner families (41 years old). However, as was the case for stay-at-home mothers, stay-at-home fathers were more likely to have lower levels of education. In 2015, 42 percent had a high school diploma or less. In comparison, 31 percent of single-earner fathers and 25 percent of dual-earner fathers had similar levels of education.

=== East Asia ===
Stay-at-home dads are not prevalent in East Asian countries, which generally have strict traditional gender roles. However, a survey conducted in 2008 in Japan suggested that nearly one-third of married men would accept the role. The Japanese government passed a law in April 1992 allowing time off following the birth of a child for both male and female employees. In 1996, 0.16 percent of Japanese fathers took time off of work to raise children. In South Korea, about 5,000 men were stay-at-home dads in 2007. Even so, stay-at-home dads face discrimination from stay-at-home mothers, and are often ostracized.

==== China ====
Beginning in the 2000s, the stay-at-home dad began to emerge as a role in China, though some remain uncomfortable with the way the role changes traditional family dynamics. Customs in China suggest that men must be the heads of their households. Stereotyping is an issue for stay-at-home dads, who sometimes prefer not to tell others about their family arrangement. Traditional ideas promote criticism of "woman-like" men, and many feel that they would face humiliation and criticism for being stay-at-home dads. Others suppose they would be looked at as having a wife that is "too strong".

==== North Korea ====
Until around 1990, the North Korean state required every able-bodied adult to be employed by some state enterprise. Whilst some 30 percent of married women of working age were allowed to stay at home as full-time housewives (less than some countries in the same region like South Korea, Japan and Taiwan, more than Soviet Union, Mainland China or Nordic countries like Sweden, about the same as today's United States). In the early 1990s, an estimated 600,000–900,000 people perished in the famine, which was largely a product of the North Korean government's unwillingness to reform the economy, and the old system began to fall apart. In some cases women began by selling household items they could do without, or homemade food. Today at least three-quarters of North Korean market vendors are women.

=== United Kingdom ===
According to a 2022 article, 105,000 British men are stay-at-home dads.

=== United States ===
In 2008, an estimated 140,000 married fathers worked in the home as their children's primary caregivers while their wives worked outside the home to provide for the family. This number was less than the previous two years, according to the US Census Bureau. In 2007, stay-at-home dads made up approximately 2.7 percent of the nation's stay-at-home parents. This is triple the percentage from 1997, and has been consistently higher each year since 2005. In 2006, stay-at-home dads were caring for approximately 245,000 children; 63 percent of stay-at-home dads had two or more children. These statistics only account for married stay-at-home dads; there are other children being cared for by single fathers or gay couples. Also, it is difficult to ascertain how many of these stay-at-home dads have accepted the role voluntarily, and how many have been forced into it by the economic crisis of the late 2000s and early 2010s, during which a great number of mostly-male blue-collar industries suffered significant losses and many previously employed men entered periods of prolonged unemployment.

== See also ==
- Stay-at-home parent
- Stay-at-home mother
- Double burden
- Father's rights
- Housewife
- Masculism
- Nursing father
- Paternal bond
- Parental leave
- Sociology of the family § Sociology of fatherhood
