= Stay-at-home parent =

Stay-at-home parent may refer to:

- Stay-at-home dad
- Stay-at-home mother
