= Nursing father =

Male parent providing primary care

A nursing father is a male parent who provides primary care for an infant. This term applies to many different types of species. This concept regarding humans is mostly an emerging phenomenon of the 21st century. It is considered a consequence of the changing perceptions of the role of family and women in the Western world. A nursing father may take on the roles which have been traditionally or stereotypically assigned to women. This includes feeding and bathing the infant, and providing all other necessities for the baby.

Historically, "breastfeeding" refers not only to breastfeeding but also to caring for and raising a child.This concept regarding humans is mostly an emerging phenomenon of the 21st century. It is considered a consequence of the changing perceptions of the role of family and women in the Western world. A nursing father may take on the roles which have been traditionally or stereotypically assigned to women. This includes feeding and bathing the infant, and providing all other necessities for the baby.This also includes responding to the baby's needs, providing emotional support, and participating in daily childcare.

== Historical and cultural background ==
Fathers have participated in infant care throughout history, although the extent and visibility of paternal caregiving have varied among societies. In many cultures, infant feeding was traditionally associated with mothers or wet nurses, while fathers often contributed through protection, provision, and childcare. Modern concepts of involved fatherhood increasingly emphasize direct caregiving.
