= Primary socialization =

Concept in sociology

Primary socialization in sociology is the period early in a person's life during which they initially learn and develop themselves through experiences and interactions. This process starts at home through the family, in which one learns what is or is not accepted in society, social norms, and cultural practices that eventually one is likely to take up. Primary socialization through the family teaches children how to bond, create relationships, and understand important concepts including love, trust, and togetherness. Agents of primary socialization include institutions such as the family, childhood friends, the educational system, and social media. All these agents influence the socialization process of a child that they build on for the rest their life. These agents are limited to people who immediately surround a person such as friends and family—but other agents, such as social media and the educational system have a big influence on people as well. The media is an influential agent of socialization because it can provide vast amounts of knowledge about different cultures and society. It is through these processes that children learn how to behave in public versus at home, and eventually learn how they should behave as people under different circumstances; this is known as secondary socialization. A vast variety of people have contributed to the theory of primary socialization, of those include Sigmund Freud, George Herbert Mead, Charles Cooley, Jean Piaget and Talcott Parsons. However, Parsons' theories are the earliest and most significant contributions to socialization and cognitive development.

== Theories ==
=== Talcott Parsons ===
Talcott Parsons believed that the family is one of the most important institutions during primary socialization and that aside from providing basic essentials such as shelter, food and safety, it teaches a child a set of cultural and social standards that guide the child through life as they mature. However, it is just as important that the child be able to internalize these standards and norms rather than just learn them, otherwise they will not be able to successfully participate in their culture or society later on. According to Parsons' theory, primary socialization prepares children for the various roles they take up as adults, and also has a big influence on the child's personality and emotional state of being. If we skip or try not to focus on primary socialization, norms of the society will not be known by the child.

=== Sigmund Freud ===
The physician and creator of psychoanalysis, Sigmund Freud, devised a theory of personality development which states that biological instincts and societal influences shape the way a person becomes as an adult. Freud stated that the mind is composed of three components: the id, the superego and the ego. All of these three parts must cohesively work together in balance so that an individual may be able to successfully interact with and be a part of society. If any of these parts of the mind exceeds the others or becomes more dominant, the individual will face social and personal problems. Of the three components, Freud claims that the id forms first; the id makes a person act strictly for their pleasure. A newborn's mind only contains the id since all they ask for are physical desires. The superego develops as an individual moves into childhood and is described as the development of a conscience. The individual becomes aware that there are societal norms to follow and conforms to them. Lastly, the ego develops into late adolescence and adulthood and is the part of the mind that resolves conflicts between the id and the superego. The ego helps a person make rational decisions that comply with the rules of society.

=== George Herbert Mead ===
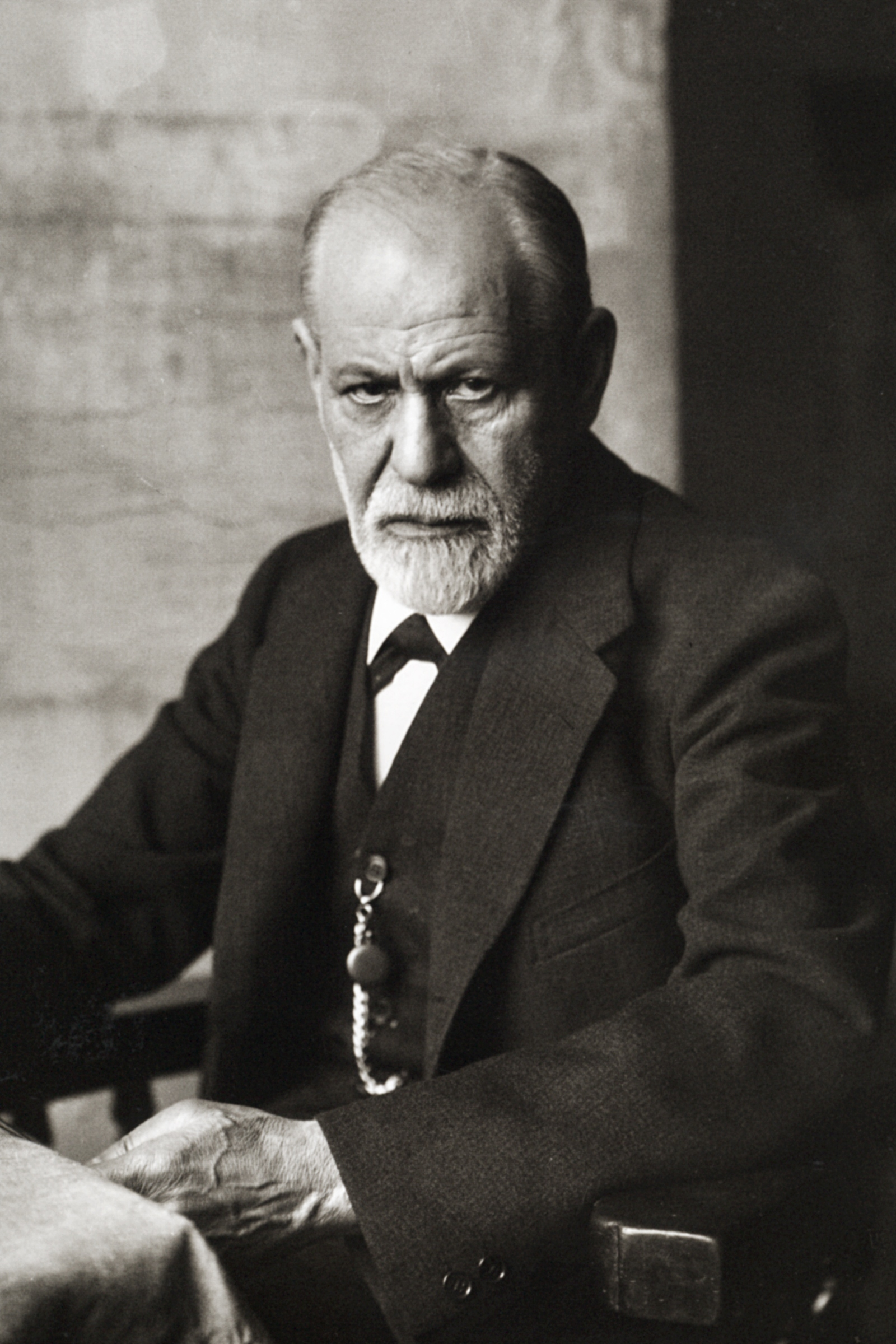
Sigmund Freud (1926)

George Herbert Mead created the theory of social behaviorism, which states that the self is created by social experiences. The self is the portion of the being consisting of self-image and self-consciousness. As individuals interact with others, they build up this self. Unlike Freud, Mead believes that the self is not created by biological instincts, but rather solely by societal influences. He also stated that the use of language and exchanging of symbols to convey meaning is what societal experiences are made up of. Furthermore, one must place themselves in the other person's position to be able to understand them; they must take up the other person's role, and only by understanding the other person's role can self-awareness be achieved.

=== Charles Horton Cooley ===
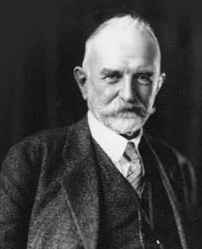
George Herbert Mead

Sociologist Charles Horton Cooley developed the theory of the looking-glass self, which is similar to Mead's theory in that it states that our societal interactions form our self-image. Cooley discussed how significant others are people whose opinions are of importance to us, and thus they have strong influences over the way we think about things and ourselves. In this case, a significant other can be any person: a friend, family member, or spouse. The theory of the looking-glass self proposes three steps for the formation of the self. In the first step, an individual thinks about how a significant other perceives them. In the second step, they imagine that a judgement about them is made by the significant other based on the perception they have of the individual. Lastly, in the third step, the individual creates a self-image based on how they believe the significant other sees them.

=== Jean Piaget ===
Psychologist Jean Piaget created the theory of cognitive development, which talks about how the mentality of children develops and matures as they grow older and further interact with society. Piaget defined four main periods of development: the sensorimotor period, the pre-operational period, the concrete operational period and the formal operational period. The sensorimotor period takes place from birth to about two years of age and is defined as the stage when infants learn by using their senses and motor skills. In this stage, the main goal is for an infant to learn that an object still exists even when it is not directly in sight; this is known as object permanence. During the pre-operational period, from roughly two to seven years of age, a child is much more capable of conceiving symbolic thought, but is not capable of reasoning yet. Also, children during this period cannot comprehend conservation, which is the ability to understand that different-looking objects can have the same measurable features, such as area, volume, and length. The next period, the concrete operational period, takes place from ages seven to eleven. In this stage, children are able to solve problems or mental operations, only in regards to real events or tangible objects, in their minds. The final stage is the formal operational period, taking place from age eleven through adulthood, and is the period in which individuals learn to solve problems based on hypothetical situations. During this stage, the individual can think logically, symbolically and abstractly.

== Means of socialization ==
=== The family ===
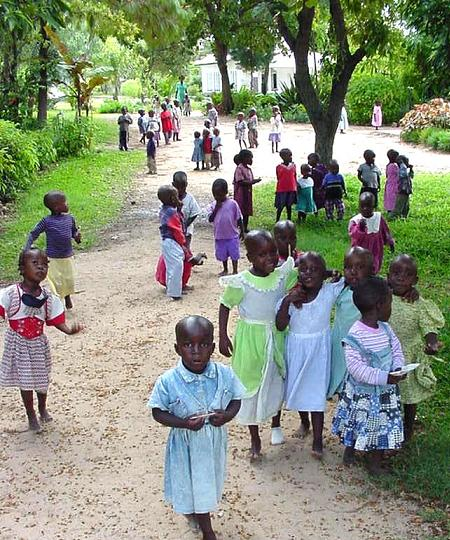
Socialization at Mother of Peace AIDS orphanage, Zimbabwe

Family, the closest set of people to an individual, are the ones that have the greatest impact on the socialization process. Many people, from birth to early adulthood, rely heavily on their family for support, basic necessities such as shelter and food, nurturing, and guidance. Due to this, many of the influences from the family become a part of the growing individual. The family imposes on the child their language, culture, race, religion, and class, and as a result all of these concepts contribute to the child's self. Failure of the family to be continuously present as a strong influence can lead to deviant behaviors later on in life. Various theories of primary socialization state that the degree of bonding during this process and the norms acquired during childhood may lead to deviant behavior and even drug abuse as an adult. Also, the ego levels of the adults surrounding the person during primary socialization, as well their behaviors towards others, affect the primary socialization process of the individual.

=== Education and peer groups ===
Educational systems introduce new knowledge to children as well as order and bureaucracy. In school a child learns about other cultures, races and religions different from their own. Education influences individuals to think and act certain ways that pertain to the norms and values of their current society. One example of this is gender roles; from a young age, schools teach children to act in particular manners based on their gender.

A peer group can be identified as a group of individuals who are similar in age and social class. By joining peer groups, children begin to detach from the authority the family has imposed in them, and start making choices of their own. Negative influences from peer groups can also lead to deviant behavior, due to peer pressure. These groups in an individual's life have significant effects on the primary socialization process as they can influence an individual to think or act differently.

=== Social and mass media ===
Social and mass media are some of the most influential agents of socialization. Magazines, television, social networks, newspapers, internet, films, and radio are all forms of mass media that entertain and send messages to large audiences. As a result, all of these messages sent out by social media have an effect on the way children see themselves and the world around them. Some examples of influential messages that are constantly seen from mass media include unrealistic or even unhealthy beauty standards, racial and sexual stereotypes, and violence around the world. These messages can all impact how a child creates their self and how they act as individuals in society.

== Boundaries ==
Primary socialization takes place during infancy, childhood and early adolescence, in which an individual builds their basic core identity and personality. During this process a person forms their self-image and self-awareness through social experience. In primary socialization the family has a grand influence on the individual, as well as peer groups, educational institutions, and mass media. Overlapped with this is the process of secondary socialization, which occurs from childhood through adulthood, wherein an individual encounters new groups, and must take up new roles to successfully participate in society. However, this process involves smaller changes than those of primary socialization and is more so associated with teenagers and adults. During secondary socialization an individual begins to partake in smaller groups of larger societies, and as a result must learn to behave appropriately. The behavioral patterns that were created by the socialization agents during primary socialization are put into action in secondary socialization.

== See also ==
- Developmental psychology
- Hidden curriculum
- Institutional theory
- Social constructionism
