= Scientific motherhood =

Scientific motherhood is the belief that women need scientific and expert advice in order to properly raise a child. It discredits a mother’s intuition and generations of knowledge accumulated by mothers. Pregnant women and mothers are given expectations for what it takes to ensure their child’s safety and success. The basis of these expectations were developed in the 19th century and have progressed with the technological advances to the present day.

In the United States, there was shift that enforced that women were now in charge of ensuring the health for their families but there was also an emphasis on the seeking of professional expertise. "Women were both responsible for their families and incapable of that responsibility." It enforced the gender stereotype of women not being intelligent or strong enough to successfully take care of their children, despite doing it for centuries. Women and families had to rely on the scientific knowledge production of doctors and scientists instead of other mothers who share experiences.

Sociologist Lee Jae Kyung has described the influence of scientific motherhood in South Korea.
