= Infant feeding =

Feeding of infants through breast milk

Infant feeding is the practice of feeding infants. Breast milk provides the best nutrition when compared to infant formula. Infants are usually introduced to solid foods at around four to six months of age.

Breastfeeding aids in preventing anemia, obesity, and sudden infant death syndrome, and promoting digestive health, immunity, intelligence, and dental development. The American Academy of Pediatrics recommends exclusively feeding an infant breast milk for the first six months of life and continuing for one year or longer as desired by infant and mother, and states that formula is an "acceptable substitute". During prehistoric times, breastfeeding infants was the only option for nutrition, such that the young would perish otherwise. Breastfeeding is rarely contraindicated, but is not recommended for mothers being treated for cancer, those with active tuberculosis, HIV, substance abuse, or leukemia. Clinicians can be consulted to determine what the best nutrition source is for each baby.

== Infant nutrition requirements ==
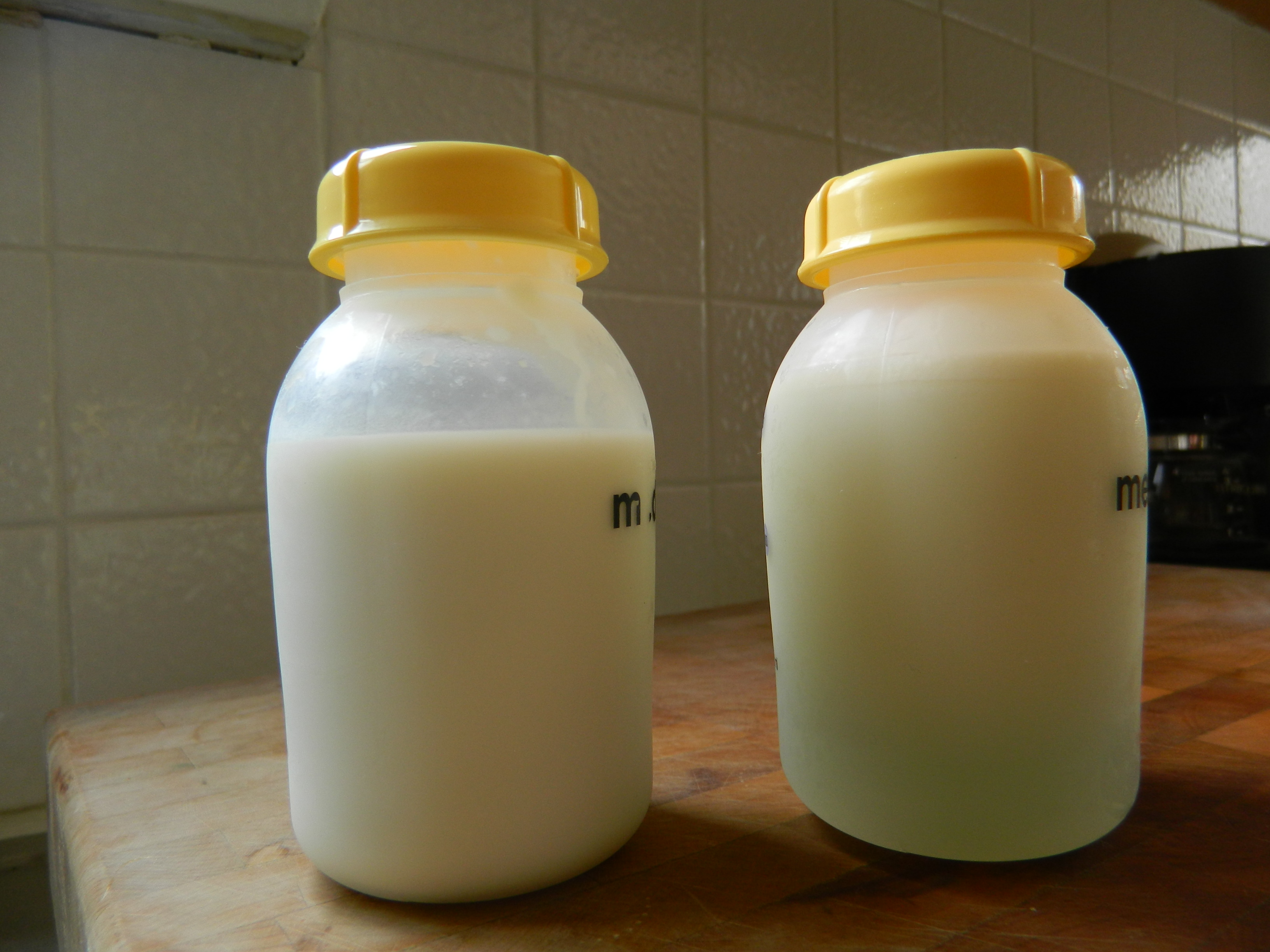
Formula (left bottle) and pumped breastmilk (right bottle)

Proper infant nutrition demands providing essential substances that support normal growth, functioning, development, and resistance to infections and diseases. Optimal nutrition can be achieved by the expectant mother making the decision to breastfeed or bottlefeed the infant before birth and preparing for chosen decision.

=== Birth to six months ===
The World Health Organization (WHO) and the Pan American Health Organization currently recommend feeding infants only breast milk for the first six months of life. If the baby is being fed infant formula, the formula must be iron-enriched. An infant that receives exclusively breast milk for the first six months rarely needs additional vitamins or minerals. However, vitamins D and B12 may be needed if the breastfeeding mother does not have a proper intake of these vitamins. In fact, the American Academy of Pediatrics suggests all infants, breastfed or not, take a vitamin D supplement within the first days of life to prevent vitamin D deficiency or rickets. Exclusively breastfed infants will also require an iron supplement after four months, because the iron is not enough at this point from the breast milk.

==== Using formula ====
Infant formula may be used instead of or in addition to breast milk due to lifestyle choices, low milk supply, or other issues that prevent breastfeeding. If a child has lactose intolerance, the parents could turn to soy-based or lactose-free formulas.

It is important to know that some foods are restricted for infants; for example, whether breast- or bottle-fed, infants do not need additional fluids during the first four months of life. Excessive intake of extra fluids or supplements can have harmful effects. Fluids besides human breast milk or iron-enriched infant formula are not recommended. These substitutes, such as milk, juice, and water do not possess what the infant needs to grow and develop, cannot be digested correctly, and have a high risk of being contaminated. Water is acceptable only for mixing infant formula. Honey also must be avoided because there is a high risk of botulism.

==== Breastfeeding ====
The frequency of breastfeeding varies among each mother–infant pair. Contributing factors are the age, weight, maturity, gastric capacity, and gastric emptying of the infant, as well as the mother's breast milk storage capacity. Typically, feedings occur eight to twelve times per day for breastfed infants. Early on, infants may not signal when they are hungry, so parents are taught to feed the infant every three hours during the day and every four hours during the night, even if waking the infant is required. The feedings will last 30–40 minutes in the beginning, or 15–20 minutes per breast if breastfeeding. As the infant matures, the feeding times shorten. Feeding often is important to promote normal growth and development, and maintain milk production in mothers who are breastfeeding.

==== Solid foods ====
Solid foods should not be introduced until four to six months of age. This is delayed because the infant is not able to digest solid foods properly. Infants are born with a reflex to suck milk in, they do not have the ability to push food away. So, if solids are given, it is considered forced feeding.

==== Newborn ====
Newborns typically consume half an ounce for the first 2 days after birth but will gradually increase to 1 or 3 ounces until 2 weeks after birth. They will begin to drink 2 to 3 ounces. One should expect to feed the baby every 8 to 12 times per day in a 24 hours span. Newborns will need to be fed throughout the night until their stomach can hold in more liquid and nutrition.

==== 2 months ====
Babies at 2 months of age will begin to drink 4 to 5 ounces every 3 to 4 hours.

==== 4 months ====
A 4 month old baby should drink 4-6 ounces every 4 hours.

==== 6 months ====
A 6 month old should drink 6-8 ounces every 4–5 hours.

=== Six to twelve months ===
==== Starting solids ====
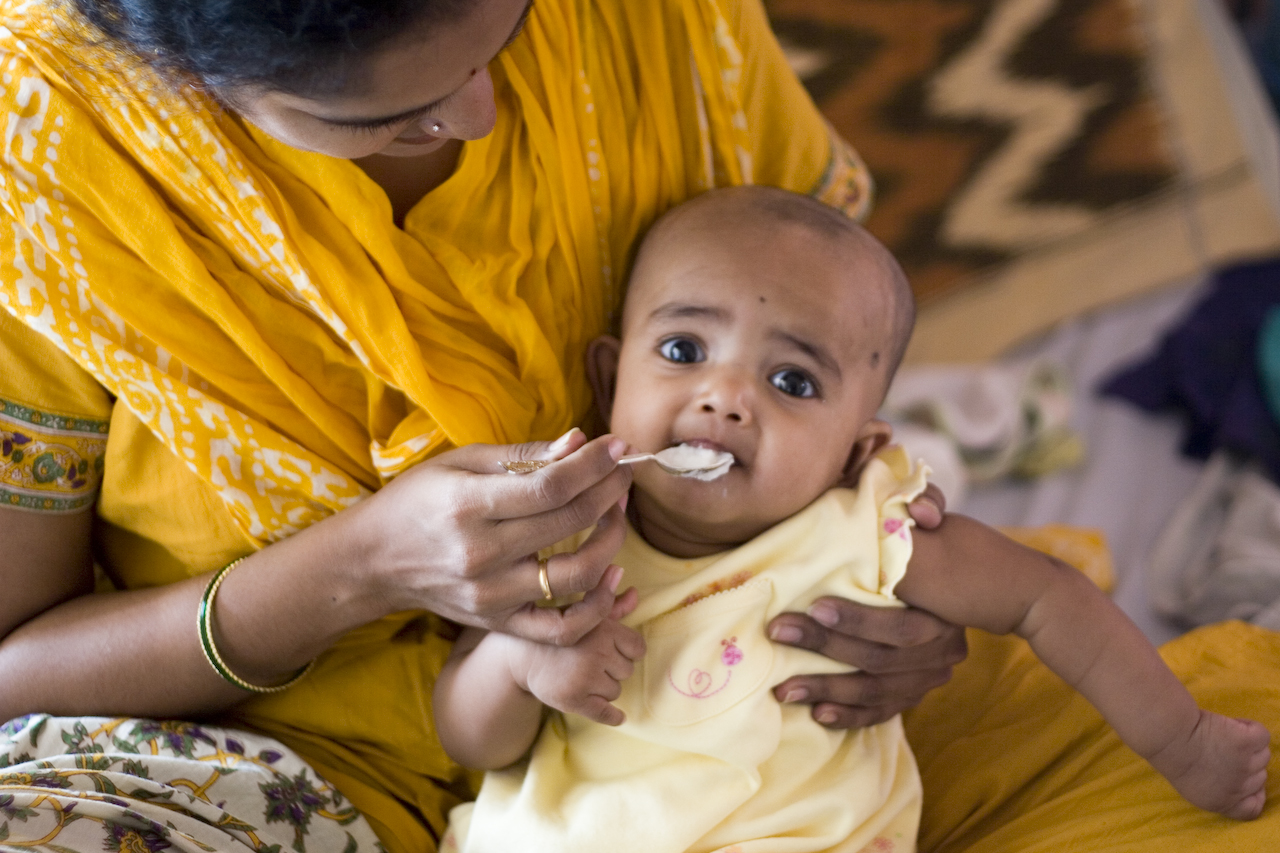
Baby girl getting her first spoonful of rice

Solid foods should be introduced from six months onward. Salt, sugar, processed meat, juices, and canned foods should be avoided. Breast milk or infant formula continues to be the primary source of nutrition during these months, in addition to solid foods. Solid food can be introduced during this age because the gastrointestinal tract has matured. Solids can be digested more easily, and allergic responses are less likely. The infant has begun teething by now, which will aid in chewing of solid food. Another milestone that the infant may have reached by now is properly supporting and turning its head; it may do this to express a dislike in certain foods. The infant has also developed enough to participate in feedings by grasping bottles and pieces of food to feed itself.

When beginning solids, it is important that the infant start consuming iron-rich solids. Infants store iron from the womb, and, by 6 months of age, it has depleted from their body. Iron-fortified infant cereal has traditionally been the first solid introduced due to its high iron content. Cereals can be made of rice, barley, or oatmeal. However, there is increasing suggestion that iron-rich whole foods, such as meat and legumes, might be a better choice than iron-fortified processed foods such as manufactured rice cereals.

== Health benefits of breast milk ==
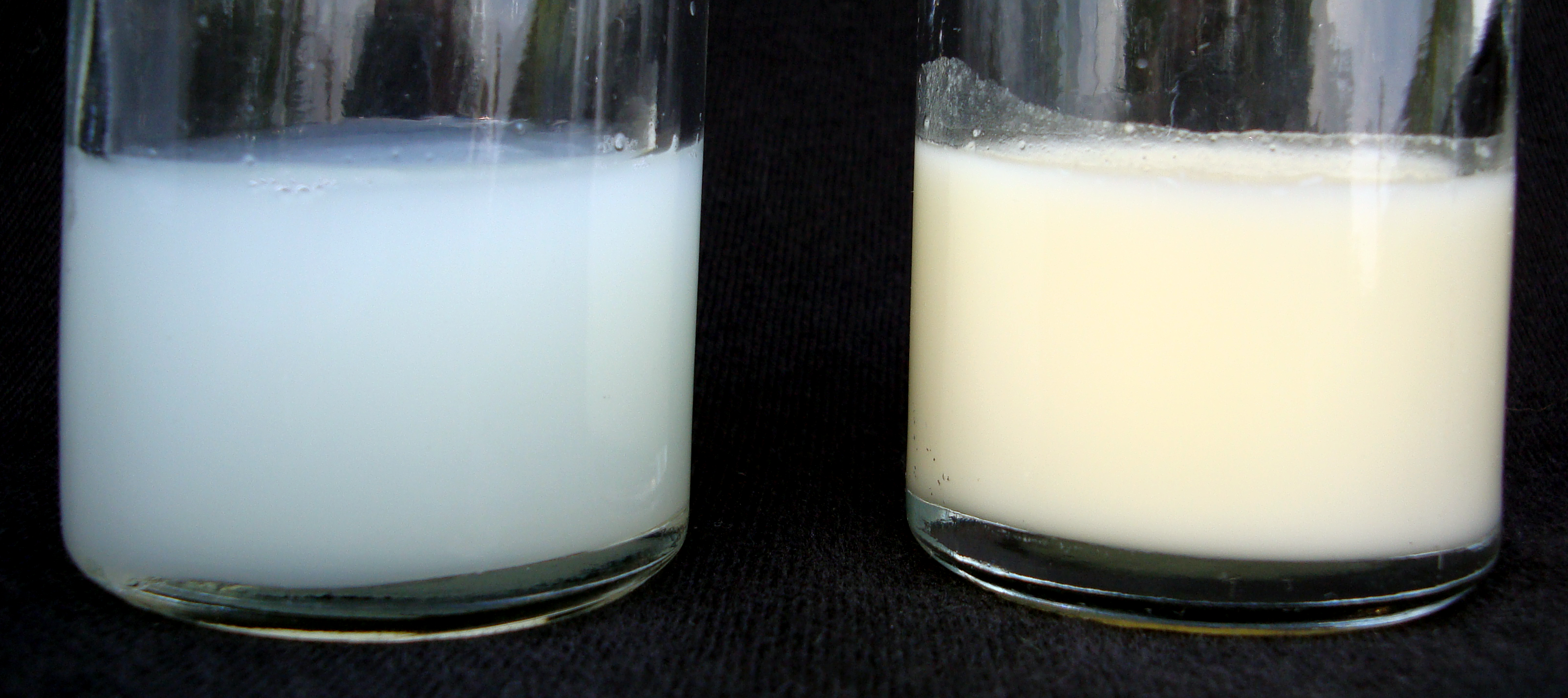
Foremilk (left) has a higher water content and a lower fat content to satisfy thirst. Hindmilk (right) has a lower water content and a higher fat content to satisfy hunger.

Each year in the U.S. roughly 27% of infants and children are affected by disease. Breastfeeding can lower the risk of respiratory, gastrointestinal, and other potentially life-threatening diseases. It offers protection against obesity and diabetes later in life, too. Breast milk is proven to be chemically different for each mother and infant pair; for example, a premature infant's mother will have different milk than a mature infant's mother. Breast milk can also change if an infection is detected in the infant. This natural prevention is tailored toward each infant.

=== Preventing anemia ===
Breastfed infants are at a lower risk for acquiring iron-deficiency anemia. Infants that only consume cow's milk become deficient in iron and are 50% more likely to lose blood in their stool. If the infant is allergic to cow's milk, it causes inflammation of the digestive system, resulting in chronic blood loss and decreased absorption of iron. This is why infant formula must be iron-enriched if breastfeeding is not possible. Breast milk naturally contains lactoferrin, an iron-binding beta-globulin that allows better iron absorption and digestion. Allowing the baby to absorb more iron leads to a better gut health for the baby.

=== Preventing obesity ===
Breastfed infants tend to have lower incidence of obesity later in life. Breast milk leads to a slower weight gain in early infancy, and is protective against child obesity and development of type 2 diabetes. Diabetes is a serious health problem where the body does not use insulin correctly. This diagnosis can cause many complications of the skin, eyes, feet, nervous system, heart, and kidneys. Therefore, it is important to prevent diabetes when possible, because it goes hand-in-hand with obesity.

When an infant is breastfed, it is exposed to a variety of flavors due to the mother's changing diet reflected in breast milk. A study showed that, later in life, breastfed children are more likely to eat a variety of healthy foods; this happens because food preferences are ingrained early in life. So, when infants are exposed to a variety of flavors early on, they are less likely to be picky eaters later. Another study confirmed a decrease in obesity at ages two years and four years if the infant is exclusively breastfed for at least the first four months. Breast milk feeding is considered to have high nutritional value and a low risk of obesity.

=== Preventing Sudden Infant Death Syndrome (SIDS) ===
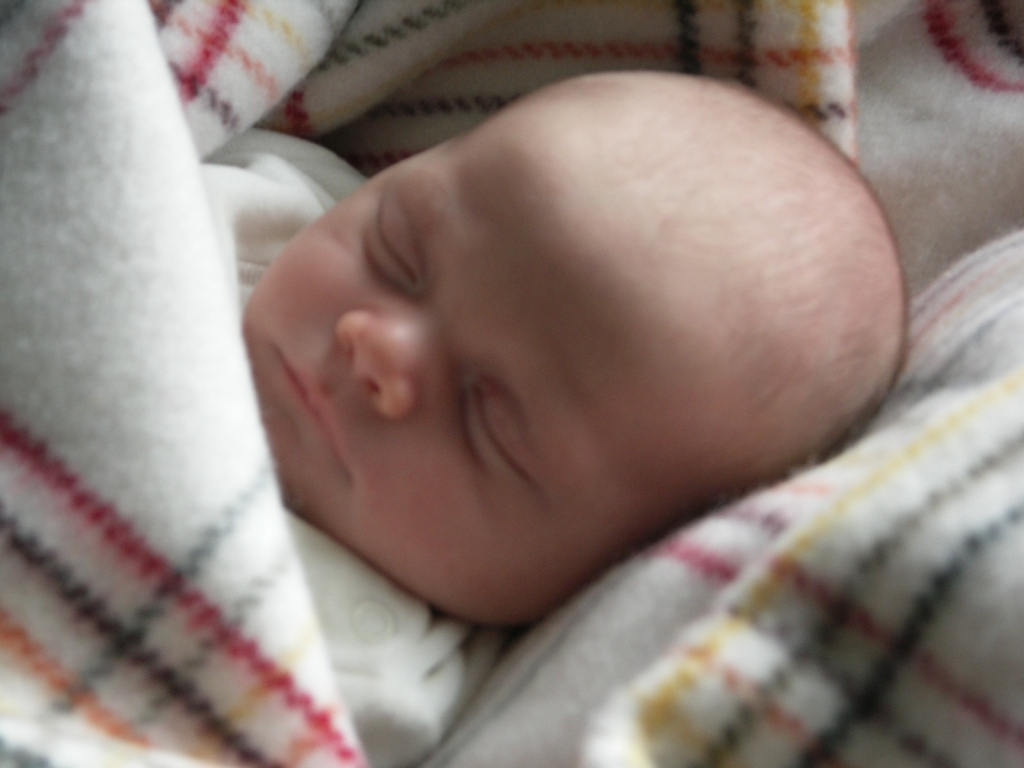
Infant sleeping

SIDS (crib death) is an unexplained death occurring in an infant who is one year of age or younger. Most deaths occur when the infant is sleeping. Breastfeeding helps reduce the risk of SIDS when done exclusively for any length of time. It is recommended to breastfeed the infant from birth to 6 months exclusively to decrease the risk of SIDS by 50%. Diarrhea and upper respiratory illnesses, both linked to a higher risk of SIDS, occur less frequently for infants who are breastfed when compared to babies who are not, thus reducing the risk. Also, breast milk provides necessary nutrition for the infant's brain to develop, which allows the baby's brain to mature quickly enough so that he or she will have the response to gasp for air when needed. Lastly, breastfed babies tend to sleep for shorter periods at a time and awaken more easily. Research has shown that babies who sleep shorter and awaken from their sleep easily tend to have a lower risk of SIDS. Conclusively, most incidences happen when the infant is asleep, so it is important to exclusively breastfeed in order to reduce the incidence of SIDS.

=== Promoting digestive health ===
Breast milk is important for the infant's digestive system. It is the best substance to give, especially over cow's milk. Infants cannot properly digest fats, which are plentifully present in cow's milk. Breast milk contains a lot of fat, too, but it also contains lipase, a substance to help break down the fat to aid in digestion; this leads to infants passing softer stools, so constipation is rare in breastfed infants. Human milk also allows beneficial bacteria to grow in the infant's intestines, which protects the mucosal barrier of its stomach, and prevents harmful pathogens from harming the infant's intestinal lining. The infantile digestive mucosa is unable to produce antibodies until about ages four through six months old, which makes the infant susceptible to many infections. However, breast milk provides the antibodies needed for the baby to stay protected until it is able to produce its own antibodies. Breast milk stimulates a microbiota, which results in the production of IgA. IgA is an immunoglobulin that is a first line of defense to protect the infantile digestive tract; this immunoglobulin is much higher in infants that are breastfed than in those that are formulafed.

=== Promoting immunity ===
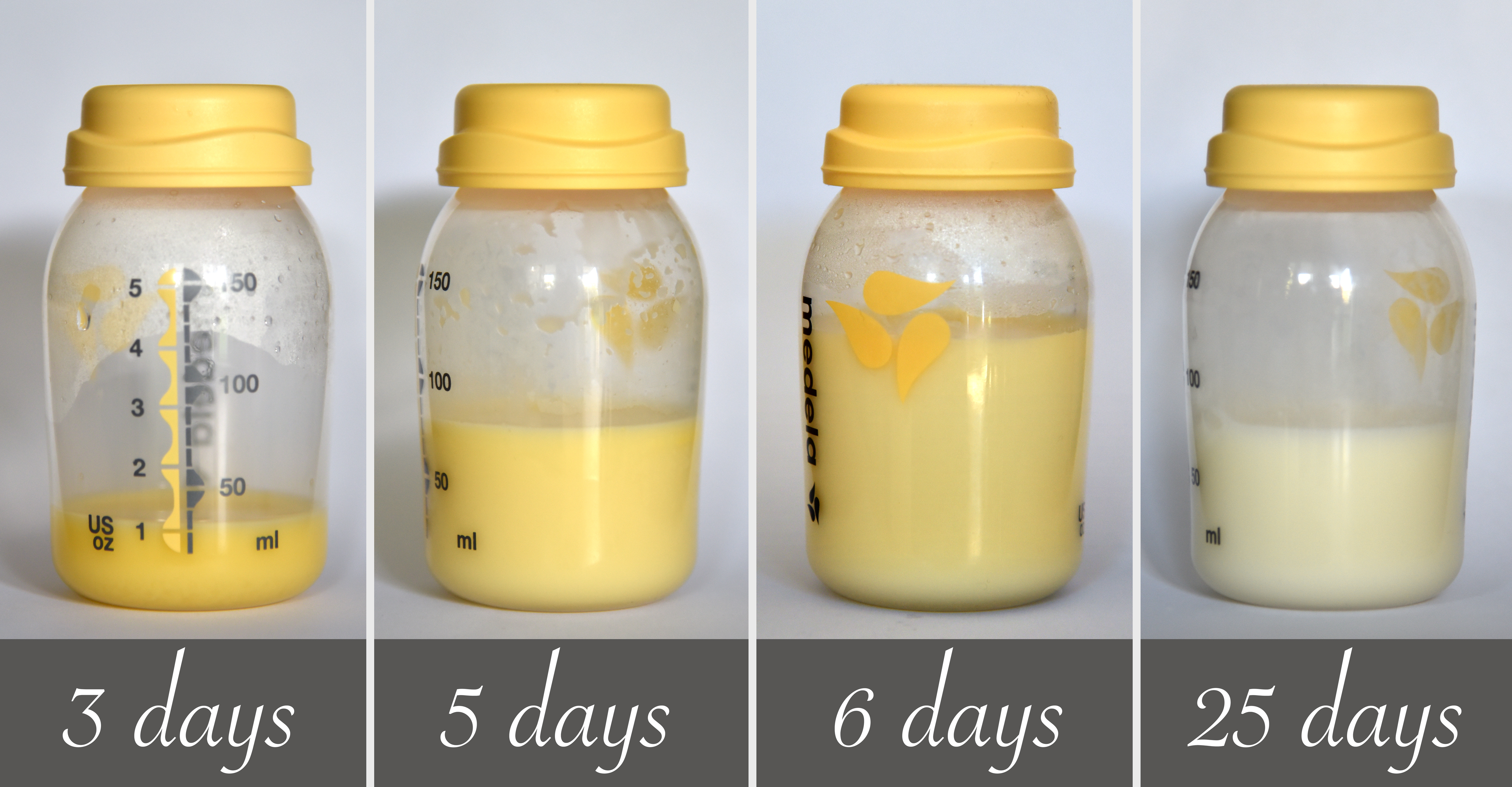
From Colostrum to Breastmilk. (Days after birth)

Colostrum is a great source of nutrition for a newborn baby; it is a thick yellow fluid that the mother produces first after birth. It has valuable nutrition that aids the baby with building immunity because it helps destroy disease-causing viruses. Other benefits of colostrum include: prevention of jaundice, aiding the baby in passing its first stool (meconium), building a strong immune system, providing a great number of vitamins and protein, and prevents low blood sugar in babies. Overall, the sticky, thick, yellow liquid called colostrum has many benefits for a newborn baby which can be only provided to the baby through breastfeeding.

Breast milk also contains much more protein than cow's milk: it contains 60% protein whereas cow's milk contains only 40% thereof. Protein is very important for infants because they need more protein per pound than adults do. For the first few months of their life, this protein must come from breast milk or infant formula; it cannot come from cow's milk. One specific protein that breast milk has is lactoferrin, which is bacteriostatic, meaning it prevents the growth of harmful bacteria. Without this protein, the baby cannot produce the immunity that its body desperately needs, resulting in a higher risk of disease and malnutrition. Breast milk provides the best source of protein for an infant.

Another immunoglobulin breast milk provides to the infant is known as IgG, which provides passive immunity from the mother to her child; this means that antibodies for common childhood diseases—like diphtheria, measles, poliomyelitis, and rubella—are passed onto the infant naturally, if the mother was immunized for these diseases in her lifetime. The infant is then protected for about 3 months, just enough time to protect it until it receives its first immunizations at 2 months of age.

=== Promoting intelligence ===
Parents generally want their child to be as intelligent as possible and to excel at school; breastfeeding can increase a child's intelligence throughout life. Exclusively breastfed children have a higher chance of possessing higher intelligence later in life. Studies have shown that infants that are breastfed for six months versus infants who were only breast fed for one month have a higher intelligence-score. Those children tend to have increased intelligence-scores in the third and fifth grades; such scores are also higher at the age of 15 years. Breastfeeding aids in the development of cognitive maturity, which leads to a higher intelligence; however, this only correlated to those children who had been exclusively breastfed.

=== Promoting oral health ===
Dental caries (more commonly known as tooth decay or cavities) is the most common chronic childhood disease. The transition from breastfeeding or bottlefeeding can be a challenging time for both parent and infant. Importantly, it represents a time where the risk for development of dental caries begins with the eruption of the first baby teeth. Transition from bottle- or breastfeeding usually coincides with the introduction of solid foods that may contain substances (such as sugars and other carbohydrates) that can cause dental cavities. The consumption of cow's milk and other non-breast-milk beverages (e.g., juices) at 6 weeks through 12 months of age significantly contributes to dental caries at 5 years old. There is a relationship between prolonged and inappropriate bottle use and increase in dental caries; as such, it is recommended that infants be encouraged to drink from a cup by their first birthday and be weaned from the bottle by 12–14 months of age. Breastfeeding cessation is dependent upon the infant and mother. Pacifier may be used as a means of soothing or distracting the infant. Dipping pacifiers in sweetened liquids (such as juice or sugary water) is discouraged due to the risk of developing dental caries.

== History of breastfeeding ==
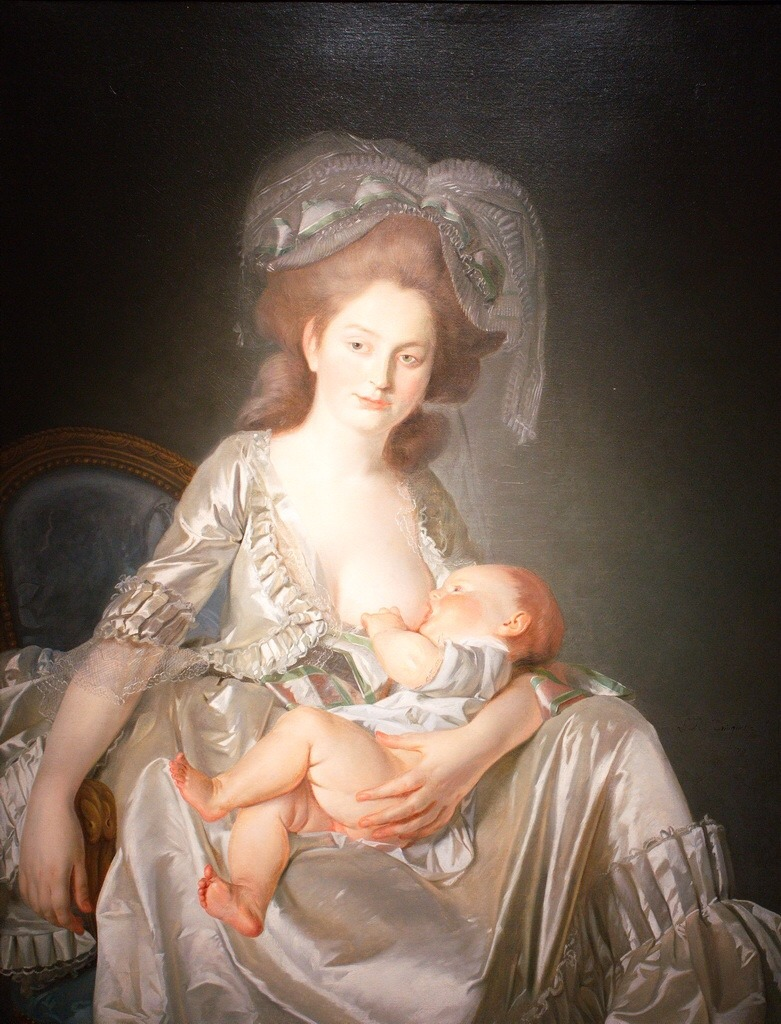
Louis-Roland Trinquesse Young woman breastfeeding her child 1777

Breastfeeding, prehistorically, was the only way infants were nourished; there was no acceptable substitute for human milk for a long time. In 1 AD, philosophers were discovering the importance of breast milk versus any substitute. It was concluded that breastfeeding helped the mother and infant establish an emotional connection. The nutritional value was still not fully understood, but it was believed that through suckling, the infant gained not only energy, but also the characteristics and personality of whomever it fed from. It was suggested that infants be breastfed as long as possible, and many were until two to three years of age.

It was not until 16 centuries later that the importance of breast milk was truly understood. In 1748, in the book "An Essay upon Nursing, and the Management of Children, from Their Birth to Three Years of Age" by Cadogan, colostrum was recognized as a substance responsible for the elimination of meconium, and prevention of illnesses of mothers and children. Also, it was believed that a bond was established if the mother breastfed her child from the hour it was born. Wet-nurses and introducing solid food before the baby turned six months were now opposed, and mortality rates decreased once accepting the value of breastfeeding. Those that continued to feed their infants substitutes like cereals, cow's milk, and broths too early, led to the infant's development of scurvy, rickets, gastrointestinal problems, and kidney stones.

Continuing on into the 19th century, scientists were relating high rates of mortality and undernourishment to the lack of infants being breastfed. At last, breastfeeding was seen as the best and only option for infant nutrition before six months. However, in 1847, when the first commercial formula was made, it promoted the use of bottles, partly due to breasts receiving a sexual connotation during this time. With the promotion of formula, the long fight for breastfeeding took a dive. Organizations that took notice came together to promote breastfeeding once again, they included Natural Childbirth Movement, Baby Friendly Hospital Initiative launched by WHO, and United Nations International Children's Emergency Fund (UNICEF). In 1990, these organizations pushed to protect and promote the idea, which still is valid and veritable, that "breast milk is the best food for infants". Factors leading to increased breastfeeding rates recently include facilities encouraging mothers to have skin-to-skin contact with the infant after birth, cultivating the initiation of breastfeeding, and facilities encouraging rooming-in, where the mother can watch for feeding cues with the infant staying in her room.

There are different beliefs and misconceptions pertaining to infant nutrition specifically the topic of breastfeeding among young people and different tribal groups. Studies have been done to inform people with more factual evidence related to the pros and cons of infant nutrition. For instance, mothers surveyed from Maasai with children ranging in age from newborn to six months believe a mixture of both breast milk and other semisolid supplements can be a more beneficial, nutritious meal for the child. A deeper study was further conducted proving the above statement to not be in the best interest of the child. Comparing the mortality and morbidity rates from Maasai and other places, Maasai has higher statistics for both. This could be the result of the lack of information on the WHO recommendations for infant and child feeding. However, another study was done in Zimbabwe related to infant breastfeeding as well. This study has shown the factors that weigh against the idea of exclusive breastfeeding. Zimbabwe has fecal conduction due to bad living conditions such as poor water sanitation and insufficient hydration. The Sanitation of Hygiene Nutrition Efficiency conducted two base trials in two districts to optimize the nutritional values of infants and to improve these conditions for child feeding. They observed household characteristics and social interactions which they then compared to how the child responds. These trials will help to hypothesize and explain the public health problems of the children. Overall, there has been a spark of interest and enthusiasm on the topic of infant nutrition, that will hopefully result in change. A change for more support towards infant nutrition and the nutritional will benefit children.

== See also ==
- Infant formula
