= Stay-at-home mother =

Mother whose primary occupation is childrearing

A stay-at-home mother (alternatively, stay-at-home mom or SAHM) is a mother who is the primary caregiver of her children. The male equivalent is the stay-at-home dad. Stay-at-home mom is distinct from a mother taking paid or unpaid parental leave from her job. The stay-at-home mom is generally forgoing paid employment in order to care for her children by choice or by circumstance. A stay-at-home mother might stay out of the paid workforce for a few months, a few years, or many years. They may still be able to earn money through various side-activities (e.g. piano lessons).

Many mothers find that their choice to be at home is driven by a complex mix of factors, including their understanding of the science of human development in the context of contemporary society. They are also likely to consider their values, desires and instincts. Some mothers are driven by circumstances: a child's special needs and/or medical condition may require great amounts of time, care and attention; the family may lack affordable, quality childcare; a family residing in a rural area may find it impractical to travel for childcare. Other mothers may prefer and desire to stay at home with their children but must work out of the home to make an income to support the family.

The stay-at-home mother's role entails physical, emotional and cognitive labor. This work is not exclusive to stay-at-home mothers; mothers who earn income still take on much of this labor as well. Fathers may share some of these responsibilities. While a mother may do the physical work of preparing meals, running errands and grocery shopping, cleaning the home, doing laundry, and providing care to her child or children, she also often anticipates her family's needs, identifies ways to satisfy them, makes decisions and monitors progress. She plans the daily meals, outings and activities, baths, naps and bedtime. She not only provides physical care through a child's illness, she consults medical professionals as necessary, (assuming she has access). She also often takes the lead in managing routine medical and dental appointments, thinking about and planning time together with extended family, and planning for holidays and special occasions. Other tasks may include researching, hiring, and managing outside help including house cleaners, repairmen, or tutors and babysitters.

There is no term that has popularly replaced stay-at-home mom or stay-at-home mother. At-home mothers are diverse; they range across the spectrum of characteristics such as age, economic status, educational and career achievements, political and religious beliefs, and more.

== Definition ==
At-home mothers exist throughout the world. However, determining the number of at-home mothers is difficult. Some mothers earn income but don't report it. Some mothers who consider themselves "at home" are counted as "working mothers" due to the definition of "employed person." In the United States, the Federal Bureau of Labor Statistics (BLS) showed, in 2021, that labor force participation of mothers with children under 18 years of age was 71.2%, leaving 28.8% to be mothers with children under 18 outside of the labor force. These mothers who are outside of the labor force are otherwise known as stay-at-home mothers. They are not considered part of the labor force because they are not employed for pay nor are they unemployed, meaning available and searching for paying work.

The definition of employed person by the Bureau of Labor Statistics is this:

"Employed persons are all those who, during the survey reference week, (a) did any work at all as paid employees; (b) worked in their own business, profession, or on their own farm; or (c) worked 15 hours or more as unpaid workers in an enterprise operated by a member of the family."

By this definition, a mother could have worked just one hour and would be considered a working parent for statistical purposes, yet that mother may consider herself to be a stay-at-home mother because that is what she did for the vast majority of her time.

== Economy ==
Following the industrial revolution, when women began to work outside of the home, mothers had the job of educating children to be productive members of the labor market. Such was essential "to the development of a vibrant capitalist economy."

The work of stay-at-home mothers is not included in calculations of the U.S. gross domestic product (GDP). When the GDP was first developed in the early 1930s, "its calculations were limited to the total monetary value of goods and services that were sold," leaving out intangibles like "improvements in surgical techniques, the value of clean water, or the care provided by a family member." Much of the unpaid work done by stay-at-home mothers was excluded from the measure. As Ann Crittenden points out in her book "The Price of Motherhood," this results in "absurdities" where for example a nurse bottle feeding a baby is included in the GDP but a mother doing the same thing is not. Another source points out: "The world of work has holistically dominated and been valued over the world of care."

Worldwide, the unpaid work of caregiving is worth $10.8 trillion a year and done mostly by girls and women. When nations and global aid organizations make economic decisions based only on paid work, they often have unintended negative impacts on unpaid caregivers. Perpetuating a false dichotomy between "at home" and "working" results in family policies that exclude millions of families. Scholars and advocates for at-home mothers and for unpaid caregiving call for change in everything from how "work" is defined and measured to how economies are structured. For example, in "Care: The Highest Stage of Capitalism," Premilla Nadasen reveals the inequities of the for-profit care economy. She points to the essential human ethic of caregiving and the elements of joy and community-building that constitute a caring society.

== Advocacy groups ==
Global and regional organizations are advocating for the interests of stay-at-home mothers and others who do unpaid domestic labor and care work. Mothers at Home Matter represents mothers and fathers in the UK and internationally, working for an "economic level playing field." In Europe, 19 organizations campaign together as FEFAF (Fédération Européenne Des Femmes Actives En Famille / European Federation of Parents and Carers at Home). This group has said: "Unpaid care should be equally valued, protected and recognised on a human, social and economic level." In the U.S., Family and Home Network campaigns for inclusive family policies that would benefit all families, equitably supporting all care. The Global Women's Strike and Women of Colour GWS issued an open letter to governments: "We demand a care income across the planet for all those, of every gender, who care for people, the urban and rural environment, and the natural world." More than 100 organizations globally signed on to the letter. Reports on government programs, as well as analyses of policy proposals, illuminate the need to recognize and support at-home parents and caregivers.

== See also ==
- Stay-at-home dad
- Housewife
