= Robin Engel =

American criminologist

- Education: University at Albany
- Known for: Research on racial profiling
- Awards: 2008 International Association of Chiefs of Police / Motorola Webber Seavey Award for Excellence in Law Enforcement 2008 National Criminal Justice Association Outstanding Criminal Justice Program Award 2009 International Association of Chiefs of Police / West Award for Excellence in Criminal Investigations 2017 University at Albany Distinguished Alumni Award 2022 Academy of Criminal Justice Sciences O.W. Wilson Award
- Scientific career
- Fields: Criminology
- Workplaces: University of Cincinnati, The Ohio State University
- Thesis: Street Level Supervision: Styles of Patrol Supervisors & their Effects on Subordinate Behavior (1999)

Robin Shepard Engel is an American criminologist. She currently serves as a Senior Research Scientist in the John Glenn College of Public Affairs at The Ohio State University. She was formerly a tenured professor in the College of Education Criminal Justice and Human Services at the University of Cincinnati (UC), where she remains an adjunct professor.

She also previously served as the director of the IACP/UC Center for Police Research and Policy, a collaboration between UC and the International Association of Chiefs of Police (IACP). She is also the former director of UC's Institute of Crime Science. She became UC's first Vice President for Safety & Reform in 2015, when the university created the position in response to the shooting of Samuel DuBose by a UC police officer. Former UC President Santa Ono said that Engel's "hands-on" approach that she has used to research policing, sometimes involving walking with police officers on their beats, would help her improve the campus's police department. She later went on to further research de-escalation tactics, notably the Integrating Communications, Assessment, and Tactics (ICAT) developed by the Police Executive Research Forum (PERF), in a research study involving the Louisville, Kentucky Metro Police Department.

== Early life and education ==
=== Childhood ===
Engel grew up in a turbulent household, witnessing domestic violence at a young age. Early in her life, she experienced a positive encounter with a police officer that changed her life for the better. The officer's intervention inspires her advocacy for the importance of law-enforcement decision-making.

=== Education ===
In 1992, Engel graduated magna cum laude from the University at Albany with her Bachelors of Arts in criminal justice and psychology with a focus on Political Science and American Government. She went on to further her education at this university, earning a Masters of Philosophy in criminal justice in 1994. 5 years later, Engel graduated from the School of Criminal Justice, Rockefeller College of Public Affairs & Policy at the University of Albany with her Ph.D. in criminology. She wrote her dissertation on how the behavior of patrol supervisors influence how subordinate officers behave.

== Career ==
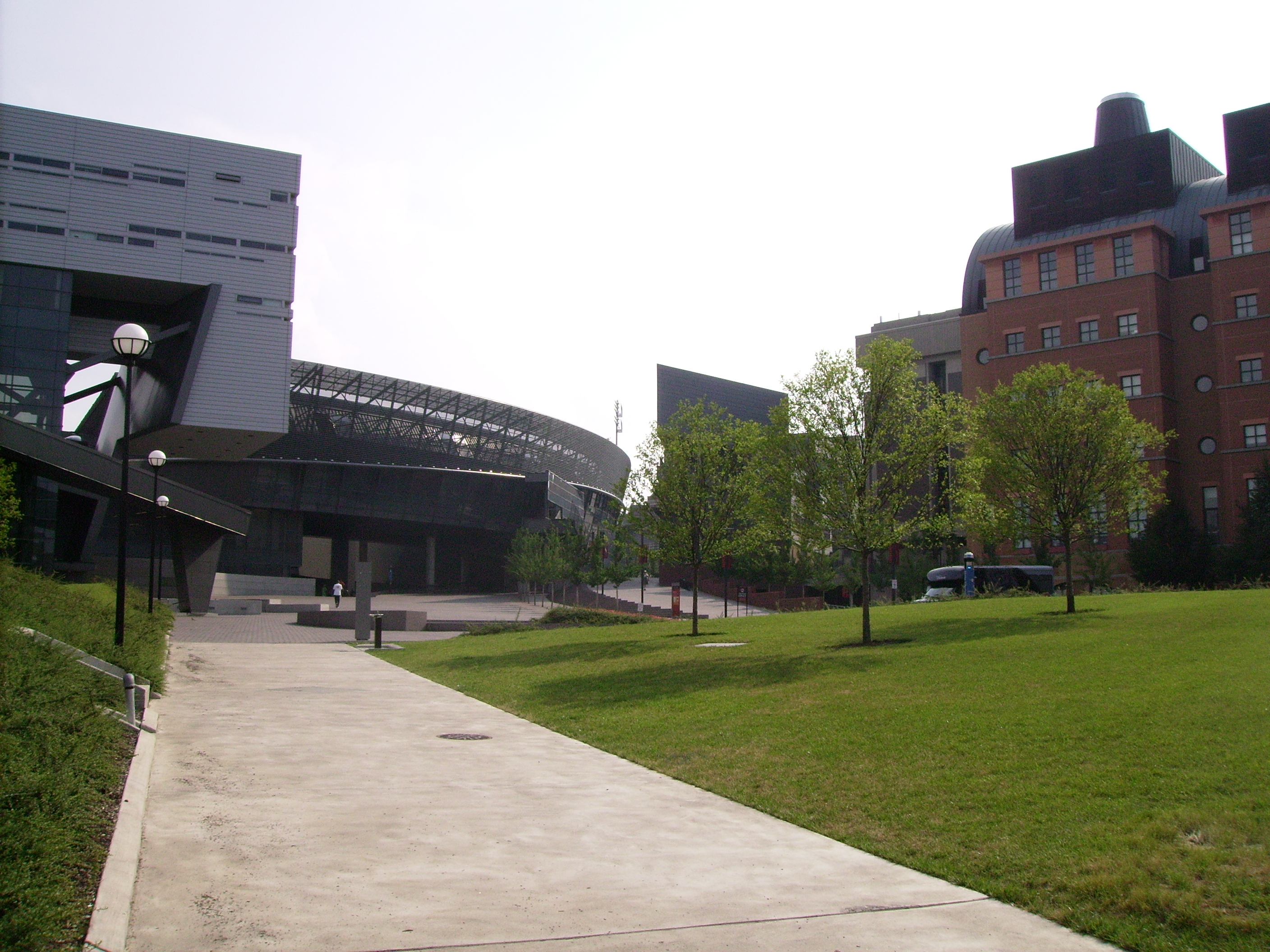
University of Cincinnati campus

=== 2015 - 2019: Vice President for Safety and Reform at the University of Cincinnati ===
During her time as a professor at the University of Cincinnati in 2015, a campus law-enforcement officer shot and killed an unarmed motorist. University officials, considering Engel's expertise in criminal justice and law-enforcement safety reform, asked for her input on how to navigate the crisis. After giving them an outline of a response plan, involving immediate crisis control and long-term police reform training, the university requested that she execute the plan. By the following morning, Engel was named the Vice President for Safety and Reform at UC, now leading the campus police department.

Engel worked with UC's police division for 3 years, working to rebuild the relationship between the police force and the community, with a constant emphasis on improving public safety. After achieving great success in this program, Engel discovered a newfound interest in pursuing and implementing de-escalation training in law-enforcement sectors.

==== De-escalation ====
Following the controversial Killing of Michael Brown in Ferguson, Missouri in 2014, the United States was pressured to implement de-escalation training for law-enforcement. During the introduction of this concept, police officers were concerned about their personal safety, fearing that de-escalation training would teach them hesitancy, compromising their decision-making in the field. Engel revisited and navigated this political climate in her new role as a police executive at UC in 2015, taking into account the concerns of the officers while testing brand-new practices. She advocates for ICAT, a de-escalation training that was originally developed in Scotland by PERF. Engel, while not affiliated with the group, applied and tested their training in the police force at UC.

Engel argues that de-escalation cannot be defined in one statement. She references a definition that several researchers use: "Bringing a situation or citizen in crisis back to a calm state using the least amount of force possible." This involves using tactics to slow situations down, such as leveraging time, distance, and positioning accordingly to resolve conflicts safely. Engel states that in policing contexts, reducing violence and the use of force are crucial components.

=== 2019: Research at the Louisville, Kentucky Metro Police Department ===
==== ICAT Training ====
In 2019, in a decision made independent from Engel, the Louisville Kentucky Metro Police Department began ICAT training for their officers. The department allowed Engel and her research team to conduct a randomized study on the effectiveness of ICAT training in law-enforcement. Her team assessed pre- and post-training outcomes within districts and compared districts that received ICAT training with those that did not. Their research found that ICAT training reduced the likelihood of using force by 28%, citizen injuries by 26%, and officer injuries by 36%, supporting the effectiveness of de-escalation training. Following this pivotal research, the United States became more comfortable with adopting de-escalation methods within police departments.

== Awards ==
=== 2008 - 2009: Criminal Justice Awards ===
- 2008: IACP/Motorola Webber Seavey Award for Excellence in Law Enforcement
- 2008: National Criminal Justice Association’s Outstanding Criminal Justice Program Award
- 2009: IACP/West Award for Excellence in Criminal Investigations

=== 2017: Distinguished Alumni Award ===
Engel was awarded the Distinguished Alumni Award from the University of Albany, 18 years after she graduated with her Ph.D.

=== 2022: O.W. Wilson Award ===
In 2022, Engel received the O.W. Wilson award from the Academy of Criminal Justice and Sciences, an organization dedicated to forwarding police training research, expanding knowledge on law-enforcement, and connecting policing with research and academics. This is the organization's most prestigious award, reserved for those who make significant advancements to police education or research.

== Peer reviewed publications ==
Engel, R. S., McManus, H. D., & Isaza, G. D. (2020. ) Moving beyond "best practice": The need for evidence to reduce officer-involved shootings. ANNALS of American Academy of Political & Social Sciences, 687, 146

Engel, R. S., McManus, H. D., & Herold, T. D. (2020. ) Does de-escalation training work? A systematic review and call for evidence in police use of force reform. Criminology and Public Policy,,

Engel, R. S. (2018. ) Focused deterrence strategies save lives: Introduction and discussion of an updated systematic review and meta-analysis. Criminology and Public Policy, 17 (1 ), 199

Madero-Hernandez, A., Deryol, R., Ozer, M. M., & Engel, R. S. (2017. ) Examining the impact of early childhood school investments on neighborhood crime. Justice Quarterly, 34 (5 ),

Engel, R. S., Corsaro, N., & Ozer, M. M. (2017. ) The impact of police on criminal justice reform: Evidence from Cincinnati, Ohio. Criminology and Public Policy, 16 (2 ), 375

Kaminski, R., Engel, R. S., Rojek, J., Alpert, G., & Smith, M. R. (2015. ) A quantum of force: The consequences of counting routine conducted energy device punctures as injuries. Justice Quarterly, 32 (4 ), 598

Engel, R. S. (2015. ) Police encounters with people with mental illness: Use of force, injuries, and perceptions of dangerousness. Criminology and Public Policy, 14 (2 ), 247

Corsaro, N., & Engel, R. S. (2015. ) The most challenging of contexts: Assessing the impact of focused deterrence on serious violence in New Orleans. Criminology and Public Policy, 14 (3 ), 471

Tillyer, R. & Engel, R. S. (2013. ) The impact of drivers' race, gender, and age during traffic stops: Assessing interaction terms and the social conditioning model .Crime and Delinquency, 59 (3 ), 369

Engel, R. S., Tillyer, R., & Corsaro, N. (2013. ) Reducing gang violence using focused deterrence: Evaluating the Cincinnati Initiative to Reduce Violence (CIRV). Justice Quarterly, 30 (3 ), 403

Tillyer, R.; Engel, R. S.; Lovins, B. (2012. ) Beyond Boston: Applying theory to understand and address sustainability issues in focused deterrence initiatives for violence reduction .Crime and Delinquency, 58, 973

Ozer, M. & Engel, R. S. (2012. ) Revisiting the use of propensity score matching to understand the relationship between gang membership and violent victimization: A cautionary note .Justice Quarterly, 29 (5 ), 105

Tillyer, R., Klahm, C. F., & Engel, R. S. (2012. ) The Discretion to Search: A multilevel examination of citizen demographics and officer characteristics .Journal of Contemporary Criminal Justice, 28 (2 ), 184

Engel, R. S., Tillyer, R., Klahm, C. F., & Frank, J. (2012. ) From the officer's perspective: A multilevel examination of citizens' demeanor during traffic stops. Justice Quarterly, 29 (5 ), 650

Engel, R. S., Smith, M. R., & Cullen, F. T. (2012. ) Race, place, and drug enforcement: Reconsidering the impact of citizen complaints and crime rates on drug arrests. Criminology and Public Policy, 11 (4 ), 601

Tillyer, R. & Engel, R. S. (2012. ) Racial differences in speeding patterns: Exploring the differential offending hypothesis. Journal of Criminal Justice, 40 (4 ), 285

Corsaro, N., Gerard, D., Engel, R. S., & Eck, J. E. (2012. ) Not by accident: An analytical approach to traffic crash harm reduction. Journal of Criminal Justice, 40 (6 ), 502

Engel, R. S. & Whalen J. L. (2010. ) Police-Academic Partnerships Ending the Dialogue of the Deaf: The Cincinnati Experience .Police Research and Practice, 11 (2 ),

Tillyer, R., Engel, R. S., & Cherkauskas, J. M. (2010. ) Best practices in vehicle stop data collection and analysis .Policing: An International Journal of Police Strategies and Management, 33 (1 ), 69

Engel, R.S. & Smith, M.R. (2009. ) Perceptual distortions and reasonableness during police shootings: Law, legitimacy and future research .Criminology and Public Policy, 8 (1 ),

Engel, R.S. (2008. ) Revisiting critical issues in police use-of-force research .Criminology and Public Policy, 7, 557-561

Tillyer, R., Engel, R. S., & Wooldredge, J. (2008. ) The intersection of racial profiling research and the law .Journal of Criminal Justice, 36 (2 ), 138-153

Engel, R.S. & Tillyer, R. (2008. ) Searching for equilibrium: The tenuous nature of the outcome test .Justice Quarterly, 25, 54-71

Engel, R.S. (2008. ) A critique of the outcome test in racial profiling research .Justice Quarterly, 25, 1-36

== Books ==
The Power of Arrest: Lessons Learned from Research, Engel, R. S., Worden, R. E., Corsaro, N., McManus, H. D., Reynolds, D., Cochran, H., Isaza, G. T., Cherkauskas, J. C. (2019)
