= Nicole Leeper Piquero =

American criminologist and the Robert E

- Education: University of Maryland
- Known for: Research on white-collar crime
- Spouse: Alex Piquero
- Scientific career
- Fields: Criminology
- Workplaces: University of Miami
- Thesis: An Outcome Evaluation of the Maryland Hotspots Probation Program (2001)
- Doctoral advisor: Charles Wellford

Nicole Leeper Piquero is an American criminologist and a professor of sociology at the University of Miami. Piquero is also the Associate Dean in the College of Arts & Sciences at the University of Miami. She was previously employed at the University of Texas at Dallas (UT-Dallas), where she was the associate provost for faculty development and program review since 2015, and has held the position of Robert E. Holmes Jr. tenured professor there since 2016. A 2013 article in the Journal of Criminal Justice Education ranked her as one of the top five female academics publishing in respected criminology and criminal justice journals.

== Education and career ==
Piquero received her B.A., M.A., and Ph.D. from the University of Maryland in criminology and criminal justice in 1996, 1998, and 2001, respectively. She taught at Northeastern University, the University of Florida, and the Florida State University College of Criminology and Criminal Justice before joining the faculty of UT Dallas in 2011. She is the president of the Academy of Criminal Justice Sciences for 2017–2018.

== Editorial activities ==
Piquero is the former editor-in-chief of the Journal of Drug Issues.

== Personal life ==
Piquero is married to fellow criminologist Alex Piquero, with whom she has collaborated on multiple studies.
