= Travis Pratt =

American criminologist

- Education: Clark College; Washington State University; University of Cincinnati
- Awards: 2008 Alpha Phi Sigma Appreciation Award for Outstanding Criminal Justice Professor from Washington State University
- Scientific career
- Fields: Criminology
- Workplaces: University of Cincinnati
- Thesis: Assessing the Relative Effects of Macro-level Predictors of Crime: a Meta-analysis (2001)
- Academic advisors: Francis T. Cullen

Travis Cameron Pratt is an American criminologist and fellow at the University of Cincinnati Corrections Institute in Cincinnati, Ohio. He is the author of over 100 peer-reviewed papers on topics such as prison policy and theoretical criminology. He is particularly known for his research on private prisons.

== Education and career ==
Pratt received his associate's degree from Clark College in 1993, his B.A. and M.A. in criminal justice from Washington State University in 1995 and 1996, respectively, and his Ph.D. from the University of Cincinnati in 2001. In 2000, he joined the faculty of Rutgers University as an assistant professor, where he remained until joining the faculty of Washington State University in 2002 as an assistant professor. He was promoted to associate professor at Washington State University in 2004, and remained on the faculty there until 2008, when he became an associate professor in the School of Criminology and Criminal Justice at Arizona State University. In 2006 he was the recipient of the Ruth Shonle Cavan Outstanding Young Scholar Award from the American Society of Criminology. In 2010, he was promoted to the rank of full professor at Arizona State University, a position he held until February 14, 2014. Since 2014, he has been a fellow at the University of Cincinnati Corrections Institute.

== ASU lawsuit ==
Court records indicate that in 2009, while on the faculty of ASU, Pratt became romantically involved with Tasha Kunzi, a graduate student there. Kunzi left ASU in 2011. In October 2012, Kunzi sued Pratt, the then-director of ASU's School of Criminology and Criminal Justice Scott Decker, and the Arizona Board of Regents. Her lawsuit accused Pratt of discriminating against her. Both Pratt and the Board of Regents denied the allegations. Pratt (legally represented by ASU) and Kunzi settled the lawsuit on April 25, 2014. The other defendants in the lawsuit (Decker, ASU, and the Arizona Board of Regents) were dismissed from the suit. Pratt was fired from ASU in 2014 as a result of violating amorous-relationship policies with a different student.

== Career 2014-present ==
Since joining the University of Cincinnati Corrections Institute in 2014, he has continued his work in the areas of criminological theory and correctional policy. Along with his co-authors, he was the recipient of the Donal E.J. MacNamara Award for the Outstanding Publication from the Academy of Criminal Justice Sciences (in 2014). He has also published over 30 works in peer-reviewed journals and academic books in the last four years. He continues to mentor doctoral students, publishing with over 10 different students – those from Arizona State University, Florida State University, the University of Cincinnati, and the University of South Carolina – in multiple works. The second edition of his book Addicted to Incarceration was published in November 2018. He is the Research Director of the Harris County (Texas) Community Supervision & Corrections Department.
