= Ruth Shonle Cavan Young Scholar Award =

- Country: United States of America
- Presented by: American Society of Criminology
- First award: 1997
- Website: www.asc41.com/awards/RuthShonleCavanYoungAward.html

The Ruth Shonle Cavan Young Scholar Award is an award that has been given annually by the American Society of Criminology in honor of Ruth Shonle Cavan since 1997. It is given to a researcher who has made outstanding contributions to the discipline of criminology, and who has received his or her Ph.D., M.D., or other graduate degree no more than five years before receiving the award.

== Past recipients ==
1997	David A. Klinger	1998	Lisa A. Maher
1999	Richard A. Leo	2000	Christopher Uggen
2001	Jody Miller	2002	Alex R. Piquero, Eric Silver
2003	Eric Baumer	2004	Jeffrey D. Morenoff
2005	Charis Kubrin	2006	Travis Pratt
2007	Aaron Kupchik	2008	Brian D. Johnson
2009	Kevin Beaver	2010	John Hipp
2011	Derek Kreager	2012	Andrew Papachristos, Min Xie
2013	Christopher Wildeman	2014	Callie Burt
2015	Justin Pickett	2016	David C. Pyrooz
2017	Keramet Reiter		
