= Biosocial =

Biosocial can refer to:

- Biosocial behavior
- Biosocial criminology
- Sociobiology
