= College of Criminal Justice =

College of Criminal Justice may refer to:

- College of Justice, the supreme courts of Scotland
- John Jay College of Criminal Justice, New York

== See also ==
- Florida State University College of Criminology and Criminal Justice
- University of Cincinnati College of Education Criminal Justice and Human Services
