= John Paul Wright =

American criminologist

John Wright
- Born: John Paul Wright
- Education: Indiana State University (BS, MA); University of Cincinnati (PhD)
- Known for: Biosocial criminology
- Scientific career
- Fields: Criminology
- Workplaces: University of Cincinnati College of Education Criminal Justice and Human Services, East Tennessee State University
- Thesis: Parental Support and Juvenile Delinquency: A Test of Social Support Theory (1996)
- Doctoral advisor: Francis T. Cullen
- Doctoral students: Kevin Beaver

John Paul Wright is an American criminologist and proponent of biosocial criminology. He is a professor in the School of Criminal Justice at the University of Cincinnati College of Education, Criminal Justice, and Human Services. He is also the director of the graduate program in criminal justice there. Among the students whose Ph.D. theses he has overseen is Kevin Beaver, a professor at Florida State University.

He previously taught at East Tennessee State University for five years (1995-2000), and was granted tenure there in 2000.

Wright is a self-described conservative. He co-wrote with Matt DeLisi "Conservative Criminology: A Call to Restore Balance to the Social Sciences" and its companion web site. He has argued that humans are members of distinct races, each with distinct, evolutionarily endowed traits. This view is rejected by modern science. Wright has written articles for Quillette on the pseudoscientific subject of "human biodiversity" (HBD), a euphemism for scientific racism.

Betsy DeVos, Education Secretary for the Trump Administration cited Wright's work to justify rolling back Obama-era policies aimed at addressing inequities in school discipline.
