= J. C. Barnes =

American criminologist

- Education: Florida State University
- Known for: Work in biosocial criminology
- Scientific career
- Fields: Criminology
- Workplaces: University of Cincinnati
- Thesis: Analyzing the Biosocial Selection into Life-course Transitions (2010)
- Doctoral advisor: Kevin Beaver

J.C. Barnes is an American criminologist, Professor, and Director at the University of Cincinnati's School of Criminal Justice. He is known for studying biosocial criminology and the association between genetics and the social environment as a cause of crime. He also has interests in studying human decision-making.

In 2011, he was an assistant professor of criminology at the University of Texas at Dallas. With Brian Boutwell, Barnes co-authored a piece for The Boston Globe in 2016 about the scientific community's perceived lack of willingness to investigate genetic causes of criminality.
