= Piquero =

Piquero is a surname. Notable people with the surname include:

- Alex Piquero (born 1970), American criminologist
- Pedro Piquero (born 1976), Spanish pianist, Zen teacher, and animal rights activist
- Nicole Leeper Piquero (fl. 1996), American criminologist, wife of Alex

== See also ==
- Piquer
