= Joey Florez =

American scholar (born 1993)

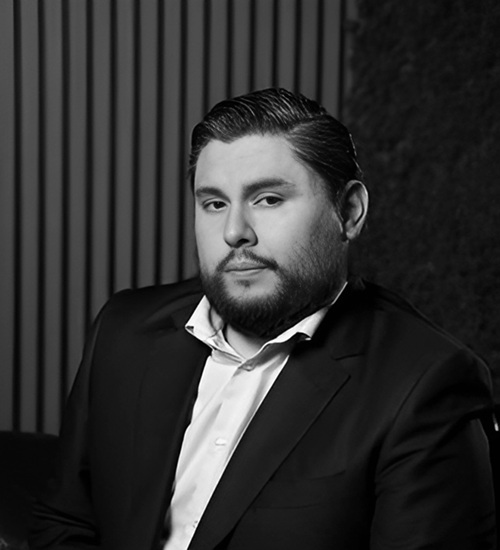
- Florez in 2025
- Born: Jose Luis Florez Betancourt; August 2, 1993 (age 33); New York City, New York, U.S.
- Education: NSU Florida; Florida Institute of Technology
- Occupations: Scholar; cultural critic
- Website: joeyflorez.com

Jose Luis Florez Betancourt (born August 2, 1993), also known as Joey Florez, is an American scholar and cultural critic.

== Background ==
Florez was born in the Elmhurst Hospital in New York City, New York, on August 2, 1993. He is of Spanish descent with American, Colombian, and Russian familial heritages. Florez is a relative of former Colombian politician and columnist Oswaldo Darío Martínez Betancourt.

Florez studied applied psychology at Florida Tech as an undergraduate and forensic psychology as a graduate at NSU Florida. He is an honorary member of Phi Kappa Phi and Psi Chi, and holds memberships in major professional organizations across the psychological and legal sectors, including the American Psychological Association, the National Criminal Justice Association, the Academy of Criminal Justice Sciences, and the American Probation and Parole Association.

Florez is known for analytical commentary within international and American broadcast radio, as well as other media, on general psychology and sociologic controversies. He has also discussed criminal justice science and popular culture phenomena. Cultural phenomena includes music cognition.

== Books ==
- A Short Introduction to Psychology (2023) ISBN 9798218173616, OCLC 1500587852
- The Psychology of UAP (2024) ISBN 9798218566302, OCLC 1499546165
- Psychology and Corrections (TBD)
