= Francis T. Cullen =

American criminologist

- Francis Thomas Cullen, Jr.
- Born: March 2, 1951 (age 74); Boston, Massachusetts
- Education: Bridgewater State College (B.A., 1972); Columbia University (M.A., 1974; Ph.D., 1979)
- Awards: American Society of Criminology's 2010 Edwin H. Sutherland Award
- Scientific career
- Fields: Criminology, sociology
- Institutions: University of Cincinnati
- Thesis: The Structuring of Deviant Behavior: Deviance Theory Reconsidered (1979)
- Doctoral advisor: Richard Cloward
- Notable students: John Paul Wright

Francis Thomas Cullen, Jr. (born March 2, 1951) is an American criminologist and Distinguished Research Professor Emeritus at the University of Cincinnati's School of Criminal Justice.

== Education and career ==
Born in Boston, Massachusetts in 1951, Cullen enrolled at Bridgewater State College in 1968, hoping to avoid getting drafted into the Vietnam War by getting a grade point average of 2.0 or higher. He graduated in 1972 with a B.A. in psychology. He later received his M.A. and Ph.D. from Columbia University in 1974 and 1979, respectively. Both his graduate degrees were in sociology and education. He taught at Western Illinois University before joining the University of Cincinnati in 1982 as an associate professor. In 1987, he became a full professor at the University of Cincinnati, and in 1993, he became a distinguished professor there. He became an emeritus professor at the University of Cincinnati in 2015.

== Honors, awards and positions ==
Cullen became a fellow of the Academy of Criminal Justice Sciences (ACJS) in 1989, and served as its president from 1993 to 1994. In 1996, he received the ACJS's Bruce Smith, Sr. Award, followed by the Founders Award in 2002, making him one of only four people to receive all three of the ACJS's awards. He served as president of the American Society of Criminology (ASC) from 2003 to 2004. In 2010, he received the ASC's Edwin H. Sutherland Award. Cullen was a winner of the Stockholm Prize in Criminology for 2022.

== Editorial activities ==
Cullen has served as editor-in-chief of two journals: Justice Quarterly, from 1987 to 1989, and Journal of Crime and Justice, from 1984 to 1986.
