= The Cauldron: The Making of the Modern Middle East =

2026 history book by Simon Sebag Montefiore

- Author: Simon Sebag Montefiore
- Language: English
- Subject: History of the Middle East
- Publisher: Weidenfeld & Nicolson (UK), Alfred A. Knopf (US)
- Publication date: 25 August 2026 (UK)
- Media type: Print (hardcover), e-book, audiobook
- Pages: 528
- ISBN: 978-1-3996-3489-2

The Cauldron: The Making of the Modern Middle East is a 2026 non-fiction history book by British historian Simon Sebag Montefiore. It traces the political, military, and cultural history of the Middle East and North Africa from 1900 to 2026, spanning the collapse of the Ottoman Empire through contemporary regional conflicts.

== Publication ==
The Cauldron was first published in the United Kingdom in hardcover by Weidenfeld & Nicolson on 25 August 2026. A United States edition was published by Alfred A. Knopf on 29 September 2026, along with an audiobook narrated by Leighton Pugh.

== Structure and synopsis ==
Following an introduction and a prologue ("Dawn in Riyadh"), the book is organized chronologically into two acts divided into fourteen parts, concluding with an epilogue ("The Garden Amidst the Flames"), maps, family trees, and a select bibliography.

- Act One: Empires: Sultans, Pashas & Proconsuls (1900–1945) covers the final decades of imperial rule in five parts:
1. the Ottoman and Qajar realms at the turn of the twentieth century (Part I)
2. the Balkan Wars and the Middle Eastern theatre of World War I (Part II)
3. post-war partitions and the mandate system (Part III)
4. the rise of new nationalist leaders including Mustafa Kemal Atatürk and Reza Shah, alongside the Rif War and Great Syrian Revolt (Part IV)
5. the World War II struggle for the region and the 1936–1939 Arab revolt in Palestine (Part V)
- Act Two: Independent States: Presidents, Kings & Imams (1945–2026) spans nine parts:
1. post-war state formation and crises in Iran and Palestine (Part VI)
2. the rise of Gamal Abdel Nasser and Pan-Arabism (Part VII)
3. the Algerian War and crisis of pan-Arabism through 1967 (Part VIII)
4. the Six-Day War, the ascendancy of Mohammad Reza Pahlavi, oil politics, and the Lebanese Civil War (Part IX)
5. the Iranian Revolution, the Iran–Iraq War, and the rise of Islamism (Part X)
6. United States intervention from the Gulf War through the Oslo Accords and post-9/11 conflicts (Part XI)
7. the Arab Spring and rise of non-state actors (Part XII)
8. regional counter-revolutions, the Islamic State, and Iranian regional influence from 2012 to 2023 (Part XIII)
9. conflicts from 2023 to 2026, including the war in Sudan, the Gaza war, and clashes involving Iran (Part XIV)

== Reception ==
According to the review aggregator Book Marks, The Cauldron received a "rave" consensus based on seven critic reviews.

In a pre-publication review, Kirkus Reviews described The Cauldron as "learned, clear-eyed, and unavoidably diffuse," observing that the early chapters move rapidly between capitals before slowing down to examine post–World War II conflicts in greater depth. The review highlighted Montefiore's emphasis on the 1979 Iranian Revolution as a turning point comparable in regional impact to the French and Russian revolutions.

Reviewing the book for Harvard University's Belfer Center for Science and International Affairs, historian Calder Walton praised its geographical breadth—incorporating Morocco, Algeria, Sudan, Yemen, Turkey, the Gulf states, and Iran alongside the Israeli–Palestinian conflict—and its rejection of single-cause explanations. Walton further noted, though, that the rapid pace and number of dynasties, militias, and leaders could feel "dizzying," and that carrying the account up to 2026 enters contested ground where historical evidence remains incomplete.

Historian Benny Morris, writing in Quillette, praised Montefiore's prose and use of anecdotes but found parts of the chronological account terse and dry.
