= Donna M. Bishop =

American criminologist

- Education: State University of New York at Albany
- Scientific career
- Fields: Criminology
- Workplaces: University of Central Florida; Northeastern University
- Thesis: Deterrence and social control: a longitudinal study of the effects of sanctioning and social bonding on the prevention of delinquency (1982)

Donna Marie Bishop is an American criminologist and emeritus professor at Northeastern University.

== Education and career ==
Bishop received her Ph.D. from the State University of New York at Albany in 1982. She began working as a full professor at Northeastern in 1999. Prior to joining the faculty of Northeastern, she taught for 18 years in the state university system in Florida, including 13 years at the University of Florida Center for Studies in Criminology and Law, and 5 years at the University of Central Florida Department of Criminal Justice and Legal Studies., including the University of Central Florida.

== Research ==
Bishop is known for her research on the juvenile justice system in the United States, as well as the ways in which minors are processed by the adult justice system. Her research on this subject has found that minors transferred to the adult justice system have higher rates of recidivism than do minors who remained in the juvenile justice system. She has also published multiple studies finding that juveniles transferred to adult court recidivate faster and more often than do those who remained in the juvenile system.

== Editorial activities ==
Bishop is the former editor-in-chief of Justice Quarterly, and is a member of the editorial boards of six criminology and criminal justice journals.
