= Northwestern University Institute for Policy Research =

Research center at Northwestern University

Institute for Policy Research
- Abbreviation: IPR
- Formation: September 1968; 58 years ago
- Founded at: Evanston, Illinois
- Type: Research center
- Purpose: Public policy research
- Headquarters: 2040 Sheridan Road, Evanston, Illinois, 60208
- Director: Andrew Papachristos
- Associate Director: Laurel Harbridge-Yong
- Sr. Director of Operations and Outreach: Franesca Gaiba
- Parent organization: Northwestern University
- Website: ipr.northwestern.edu
- Formerly called: Center for Urban Affairs; Center for Urban Affairs and Policy Research

The Institute for Policy Research (IPR) is an interdisciplinary public policy research center at Northwestern University.

== History ==
The Institute for Policy Research was founded in September 1968, originally as the Center for Urban Affairs, with a $700,000 grant from the Ford Foundation. Raymond W. Mack, one of the center's original co-founders, also became its first director, serving in this role until 1971. John McKnight was the center's first associate director. When the center was first founded, Payson S. Wild, the then-vice president of Northwestern, said, "Our Center for Urban Affairs can make a unique contribution if we have scholars committed to the application of scientific research in the realm of public policy." In 1983, the center was renamed the Center for Urban Affairs and Policy Research. In 1996, Fay Lomax Cook became director of the center. Shortly thereafter, she changed its name to the Institute for Policy Research. She stepped down from her role as director in August 2012.

== Directors ==
- Raymond W. Mack (1968–71)
- Louis Masotti (1971–80)
- Margaret T. Gordon (1980–88)
- Burton Weisbrod (1991–96)
- Fay Lomax Cook (1996–2012)
- David Figlio (2012–2017)
- Diane Schanzenbach (2017–2023)
- Andrew Papachristos (2023–present)
