= Journal of Criminal Justice =

- Discipline: Criminal justice
- Language: English
- Edited by: Matthew DeLisi

Publication details
- History: 1973–present
- Publisher: Elsevier
- Frequency: Bimonthly
- Impact factor: 3.973 (2018)

Standard abbreviations
- ISO 4: J. Crim. Justice

Indexing
- CODEN: JCJUDJ
- ISSN: 0047-2352 (print); 0047-2352 (web)

Links
- Journal homepage; Online access

The Journal of Criminal Justice (abbreviated J. Crim Justice, or JCJ) is a bimonthly peer-reviewed academic journal covering criminal justice. It was established in 1973 and is published by Elsevier. The editor-in-chief is Matthew DeLisi (Iowa State University). According to the Journal Citation Reports, the journal has a 2017 impact factor of 3.973. The Journal is to provide a forum for the dissemination of new ideas, new information, and the application of new methods to the problems and functions of the criminal justice system. It emphasizes innovation and creative thought of the highest quality.
