= Biosociology =

Biosociology may refer to:

- biosocial theory, a theory in behavioral and social science
- sociobiology, a synthesis of scientific disciplines
