= Emily Wang =

American physician and professor

- Education: University of California, San Francisco; Harvard University; Duke University
- Scientific career
- Workplaces: Yale School of Medicine

Emily Ai-hua Wang is an American physician who is a professor of medicine at the Yale School of Medicine. She is Director of the Yale SEICHE Center for Health and Justice. She was appointed a MacArthur Fellow in 2022.

== Early life and education ==
Wang earned her bachelor's degree at Harvard University. She moved to Duke University as a medical student, where she completed her studies in 2003. Wang moved to the West Coast for her internship and residency, and eventually earned a Master of Advanced Studies at the University of California, San Francisco.

== Research and career ==
At the start of her career, Wang planned to specialize in HIV treatment, but she became concerned about health inequality in the incarcerated population. At the time, half of all people in the United States had an incarcerated family member, and communities with high levels of incarceration had lower life expectancy. She began volunteering at a women's prison, and dedicated her career to social justice.

Wang leads the Center for Health and Justice research program "the Health Justice Lab", which studies how incarceration influences chronic health. She is interested in interventions that may mitigate incarceration. She founded the Transitions Clinic Network, a network of health centers who care for people who are released from correctional facilities.

== Awards and honors ==
- 2021 Elected Fellow of the American Society for Clinical Investigation
- 2022 MacArthur Fellows Program
- 2023 Elected Fellow of the National Academy of Medicine

== Selected publications ==
- Christopher Wildeman; Emily A Wang (1 April 2017). "Mass incarceration, public health, and widening inequality in the USA". The Lancet. 389 (10077): 1464–1474. doi:10.1016/s0140-6736(17)30259-3. ISSN 0140-6736. PMID 28402828. Wikidata Q39237659.
- Emily A Wang; Clemens S Hong; Shira Shavit; Ronald Sanders; Eric Kessell; Margot B Kushel (September 2012). "Engaging individuals recently released from prison into primary care: a randomized trial". American Journal of Public Health. 102 (9): e22-9. doi:10.2105/ajph.2012.300894. ISSN 1541-0048. PMC 3482056. PMID 22813476. Wikidata Q58206583.
- Hedwig Lee; Christopher Wildeman; Emily A. Wang; Niki Matusko; James S. Jackson (16 January 2014). "A heavy burden: the cardiovascular health consequences of having a family member incarcerated". American Journal of Public Health. 104 (3): 421–427. doi:10.2105/ajph.2013.301504. ISSN 1541-0048. PMC 3953802. PMID 24432879. Wikidata Q55205913.
