= Daniel Mears =

American criminologist

- Born: Daniel Preston Mears; 1966 (age 59–60)
- Education: Haverford College, University of Texas at Austin
- Awards: Academy of Criminal Justice Sciences’s Outstanding Book Award (2010 and 2019)
- Scientific career
- Fields: Criminology
- Workplaces: Florida State University College of Criminology & Criminal Justice

Daniel Preston Mears (born 1966) is an American criminologist, a Fellow of the American Society of Criminology, and the Mark C. Stafford Professor of Criminology at the Florida State University College of Criminology & Criminal Justice.

== Scientific career ==
Mears has worked as a Fellow of the American Society of Criminology, as well as a professor in the Florida State University College of Criminology & Criminal Justice. A 2011 ranking of American criminologists ranked Mears as the second most influential in terms of scholarly contributions. His research interests include the study of supermax prisons, immigration and crime, causes of offending, sentencing, and juvenile and criminal justice policy.

== Published works ==
=== Books ===
Mears is the author of several books.

- Mears, Daniel P. (2010). American Criminal Justice Policy: An Evaluation Approach to Increasing Accountability and Effectiveness (Hardback). New York: Cambridge University Press. ISBN 9780521762465.
- Mears, Daniel P.; Cochran, Joshua C. (October 2014). Prisoner reentry in the era of mass incarceration (Paperback). Los Angeles: Sage Publications, Inc. ISBN 9781483316727.
- Mears, Daniel Preston (September 2017). Out-of-control criminal justice: the systems improvement solution for more safety, justice, accountability, and efficiency (Paperback). New York: Cambridge University Press. ISBN 9781316614044.
- Mears, Daniel P.; Cochran, Joshua C. (February 14, 2019). Fundamentals of Criminological and Criminal Justice Inquiry: the science and art of conducting, evaluating, and using research (Hardback). Cambridge: Cambridge University Press. ISBN 9781107193703.
