= Kevin Beaver =

American criminologist and academic

Kevin M. Beaver
- Born: September 17, 1977 (age 48)
- Education: Ohio University, University of Cincinnati
- Known for: Biosocial criminology
- Awards: American Society of Criminology’s Ruth Shonle Cavan Young Scholar Award, National Institute of Justice’s Graduate Research Fellowship
- Scientific career
- Fields: Criminology
- Workplaces: Florida State University
- Thesis: The Intersection of Genes, the Environment, and Crime and Delinquency: A Longitudinal Study of Offending (2006)
- Doctoral advisor: John Paul Wright
- Notable students: J. C. Barnes, Brian Boutwell

Kevin Michael Beaver (born September 17, 1977) is an American criminologist and the Judith Rich Harris Professor of Criminology at Florida State University's College of Criminology and Criminal Justice, where he is also the director of the Distance Learning Program.

== Education ==
Beaver graduated from Ohio University in 2000 with a B.A. in sociology, and received his M.S. in criminal justice in 2001 from the University of Cincinnati. He went on to receive his Ph.D. in criminal justice, also from the University of Cincinnati, in 2006.

== Career ==
Beaver joined the faculty of Northern Kentucky University in 2006 as an instructor in the Department of Political Science and Criminal Justice. That same year, he joined Florida State as an assistant professor, and became an associate professor in 2010.

== Research ==
Beaver's research focuses on the field of biosocial criminology, including studies on the causes of antisocial behaviors, such as delinquency, which he has said has both genetic and environmental causes. He has also researched the link between parenting behavior and child intelligence, as well as the potential for genetic factors to contribute to academic achievement in children. His research has also found a link between a rare form of the MAOA gene (known as the "warrior gene") and violent behavior and weapon use among boys.

== Editorial activities ==
Beaver is the editor-in-chief of the Journal of Drug Issues.
