= Human Biodiversity Institute =

Far-right scientific group

The Human Biodiversity Institute (HBI) refers to a far-right group of scientists, academics, and others associated with pseudoscientific race theories and neo-eugenics. Founded by Steve Sailer in the late 1990s, the theories were given the euphemism human biodiversity. Ideas that originated in the group, presently believed to be dormant, have since entered general alt-right discourse.

== Origins ==
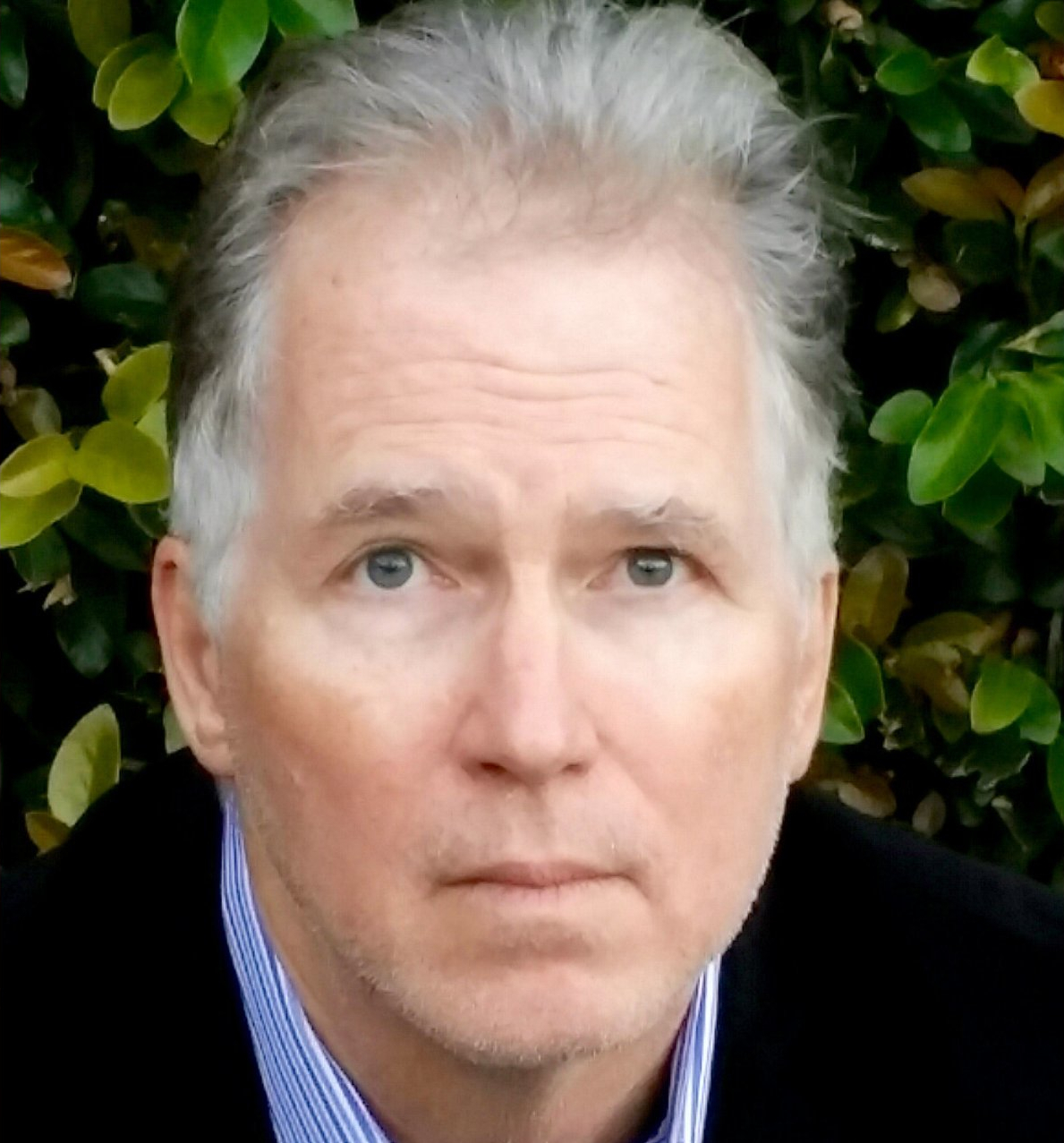
Steve Sailer, the group's founder

The Human Biodiversity Institute was founded by Steve Sailer, a journalist who has written for VDARE, an American far-right political website. Sailer has held numerous explicitly racist views. He has bemoaned a perceived lack of white identity politics, and has blamed this on a Jewish conspiracy. The Southern Poverty Law Center has described Sailer as a white supremacist. Sailer began using the term "human biodiversity" in the mid-1990s. The Human Biodiversity Institute was run by Steve Sailer as a think tank in the late 1990s through the 2000s.

== Themes ==
The framing of human biodiversity discourse is meant to confer upon the movement scientific authority, and present it as empirical and rational. On this basis, advocates of this idea wish to advance social policies based on their observations. In a study on white nationalism, the authors describe human biodiversity as a movement to "catalog and create hereditarian ideas" about racial differences, and to then distribute them as red pills to transform online discourse. Human biodiversity materials are used by alt-right proponents to make arguments on 4chan, Reddit, and Twitter. Some proponents promote it in the alt-right blogosphere.

The human biodiversity movement refers to a set of ideas about scientific racism that formed in the 1990s. Sailer developed a concept of "ethnic nepotism", favoring members of one's own group. Sailer took this as a biological imperative that necessitates "ethnocentrism, clannishness, xenophobia, nationalism, and racism", when applied to the scale of an entire society for "ethnic nepotism".

The Southern Poverty Law Center has also associated the Human Biodiversity Institute with neo-eugenics. In 1999, the Human Biodiversity Institute presented a seminar advocating for genetically modified humans. The seminar was held at the Hudson Institute and was attended by Margaret Thatcher.

== Influence ==
Between 2007 and 2014, terminology used by Stormfront for scientific racism changed from "racialism" and "race realism", to "human biodiversity".

The Southern Poverty Law Center has associated human biodiversity with the alt-right and white nationalism. The Anti-Defamation League has associated human biodiversity with the alt-right and white supremacy. An April 2017 article in New York Magazine described the movement as a "mainstay" of the alt-right.

Human biodiversity was one of the main publishing subjects of Washington Summit Publishers, a white nationalist publishing company run by Richard B. Spencer. Quillette has also published work supporting human biodiversity, leading to accusations of pseudoscience and eugenics. Contributors who have written on the topic of human biodivesity for Quillette include Ben Winegard, Bo Winegard, Brian Boutwell, and John Paul Wright.

Human biodiversity has been promoted by Milo Yiannopoulos. It has also been promoted by Stefan Molyneux and influenced Stephen Miller, political advisor to Donald Trump. It also influenced Dominic Cummings, political advisor to Boris Johnson.

== Membership ==
According to the Southern Poverty Law Center, the members of the Human Biodiversity Institute consisted mainly of journalists, academics, and scientists who discussed "differences in race, sex and sexual orientation". By summer 1999, the group consisted of dozens of well-known figures from a variety of different fields. Members of the Human Biodiversity Institute communicated primarily via an invitation-only electronic mailing list. This mailing list was called the Human Biodiversity Discussion Group. In the early history of the mailing list, Sailer published a roster of members on his website.

In 2003, known members of Human Biodiversity Institute included J. Philippe Rushton, Charles Murray, Kevin MacDonald, Gregory Cochran, J. Michael Bailey, and Ray Blanchard. The HBI also included several journalists who worked to popularize the theories and books of HBI members.

Steven Pinker was an early member of the Human Biodiversity Discussion Group. Pinker also published work by Steve Sailer in 2004, and quoted Sailer on his website. In 2009, Malcolm Gladwell brought attention to Pinker's ties to Steve Sailer, and Sailer's views on race and intelligence, after Pinker cited Sailer. According to a 2021 study on white nationalism by Panofsky et al., political centrists such as Steven Pinker have played a role in legitimizing the ideas of the human biodiversity movement.

The electronic mailing list eventually went defunct, and discourse moved on to right-wing blogs, in which members started writing about subjects such as race, genetics, and intelligence.

== Views ==
=== Human races ===
Human biodiversity discourse presumes that different human races have inherently different physical and mental capabilities. Charles Murray, a member of the Human Biodiversity Institute, was a writer of the 1994 book, The Bell Curve, which argued that African Americans were less intelligent than white Americans. The book argued that innate biological differences made racial equity impossible. They instead advocated for different roles for each race in society. Steve Sailer advocated for similar ideas, espousing different strengths for different races and ethnic groups, and advocating against affirmative action. Marantz describes how this idea combines with ideas about white supremacy:

"HBD" stood for human biodiversity—a phrase that had gone viral within the alt-right blogosphere, largely owing to Sailer's repeated use of it. Human biodiversity: the hypothesis that people are different, that they differ in predictable ways, and that some groups of people—some races, for example—have drawn stronger cards in the genetic lottery. On Sailer's blog, most discussions of human biodiversity ended up returning to one specific, enduring idea: that white people are inherently smarter than black people.

Advocates of human biodiversity may attempt to portray their views of scientific racism as being completely objective. They may then express sadness about the "reality" of differences in racial intelligence, and the implications of those differences:

One common trait amongst HBD acolytes within the alt-right is a sometimes genuine, though feigned, reluctance to accept the "truth" of racial intelligence difference based on genes. Many couch their advocacy for HBD in a faux-sadness and argue that, thought they wish it were not true, the evidence was just too overwhelming. The genuineness of this varies between individuals but often their wider politics and previous statements indicate a predisposition to agreeing with racist pseudoscience.

=== Homosexuality ===
In an August 2003 article, the founder of the Human Biodiversity Institute, Steve Sailer, characterized homosexuality as a "disease" that may be eliminated by parents in the future. HBI member Gregory Cochran has theorized that homosexuality may be caused by a gay germ. In 2008, J. Michael Bailey, another HBI member, was questioned by bioethicist Alice Dreger on whether he also viewed homosexuality as a "disease" that could be eradicated. Bailey denied that his 2001 paper, "Parental Selection of Children's Sexual Orientation", advocated for eliminating homosexuality, as he noted "[H]omosexuality, like heterosexuality, is ethically neutral." However, he did say that it would be morally acceptable, assuming means morally unproblematic in themselves, for parents to genetically select heterosexuality over homosexuality for their own children:

Bailey has insisted that, in this paper, he and Greenberg simply argued one thing: that parental rights could reasonably be understood to include genetic selection against—or for—a theoretic "gay gene" in the same way that parental rights are reasonably understood to include the right to raise children in parents' religions. A close reading of the paper certainly seems to bear out Bailey’s claims about it.

According to the Southern Poverty Law Center, Steve Sailer has portrayed homosexuality as something that might possibly be "cured", following Gregory Cochran's theories, and has also expressed a lack of concern about the ethics or morality of whether people would "cure" homosexuality.

=== Transgender people ===
The Southern Poverty Law Center has noted that many of the early supporters of J. Michael Bailey's book, The Man Who Would Be Queen, were members of the Human Biodiversity Institute. Ray Blanchard, the originator of the theory about transgender women promoted in the book, is also associated with the Human Biodiversity Institute. The book advances the theory by Blanchard that female-attracted transgender women are men with abnormal paraphilias or sexual orientations (e.g. autogynephilia). In March 2003, Steve Sailer wrote that he was sent a pre-release copy of The Man Who Would Be Queen. Blanchard's autogynephilia theory has since been promoted by groups designated by the Southern Poverty Law Center as anti-LGBT hate groups, including the Family Research Council (FRC) and the American College of Pediatricians (ACPeds).

== Wikipedia ==
In a review of far-right editing on Wikipedia, the Southern Poverty Law Center highlighted human biodiversity as one set of views that may be promoted by far-right editors:

Users who fall into this category include racialist academics and members of the human biodiversity, or HBD, blogging community. Often these are single-purpose accounts that exclusively edit on topics like race and intelligence, racial classification and bios of related researchers, like Linda Gottfredson or Helmuth Nyborg.

— Justin Ward, Wikipedia wars: inside the fight against far-right editors, vandals and sock puppets, Hopewatch, SPLC (2018)

== See also ==
- Alt-right pipeline
- Biological determinism
- Eugenics
- History of the race and intelligence controversy
