= Freya India =

British author

- Born: 1999 or 2000 (age 26–27)
- Notable works: GIRLS®: Generation Z and the Commodification of Everything

Freya India is a British writer and podcaster. Writing on women and cultural issues, she is known for her Substack GIRLS and her 2026 book GIRLS®: Generation Z and the Commodification of Everything.

== Writing career ==
India is from London and was working in a cafe before starting her Substack GIRLS. She studied politics at King's College London.

In 2026, India's Substack had over 50,000 subscribers, and focuses on issues such as modern womanhood, social media, identity, feminism, mental health, technology and culture. She also has written articles as a staff writer for Jonathan Haidt’s Substack After Babel, as well as writing articles for The Spectator, The New Statesman, The Independent, Quillette, and UnHerd.

In 2026, India published her first book, GIRLS®: Generation Z and the Commodification of Everything. The book argues that women's physical appearance, emotional and mental health, online data, friends and family, romance, and a sense of fulfillment have all been commodified.
