= GIRLS®: Generation Z and the Commodification of Everything =

2026 book

- Author: Freya India
- Language: English
- Publication date: 2026

GIRLS®: Generation Z and the Commodification of Everything is a 2026 book by Freya India which examines the commodification of Gen-Z women through shifts in technology and culture.
