= Alex Piquero =

Cuban-American criminologist (born 1970)

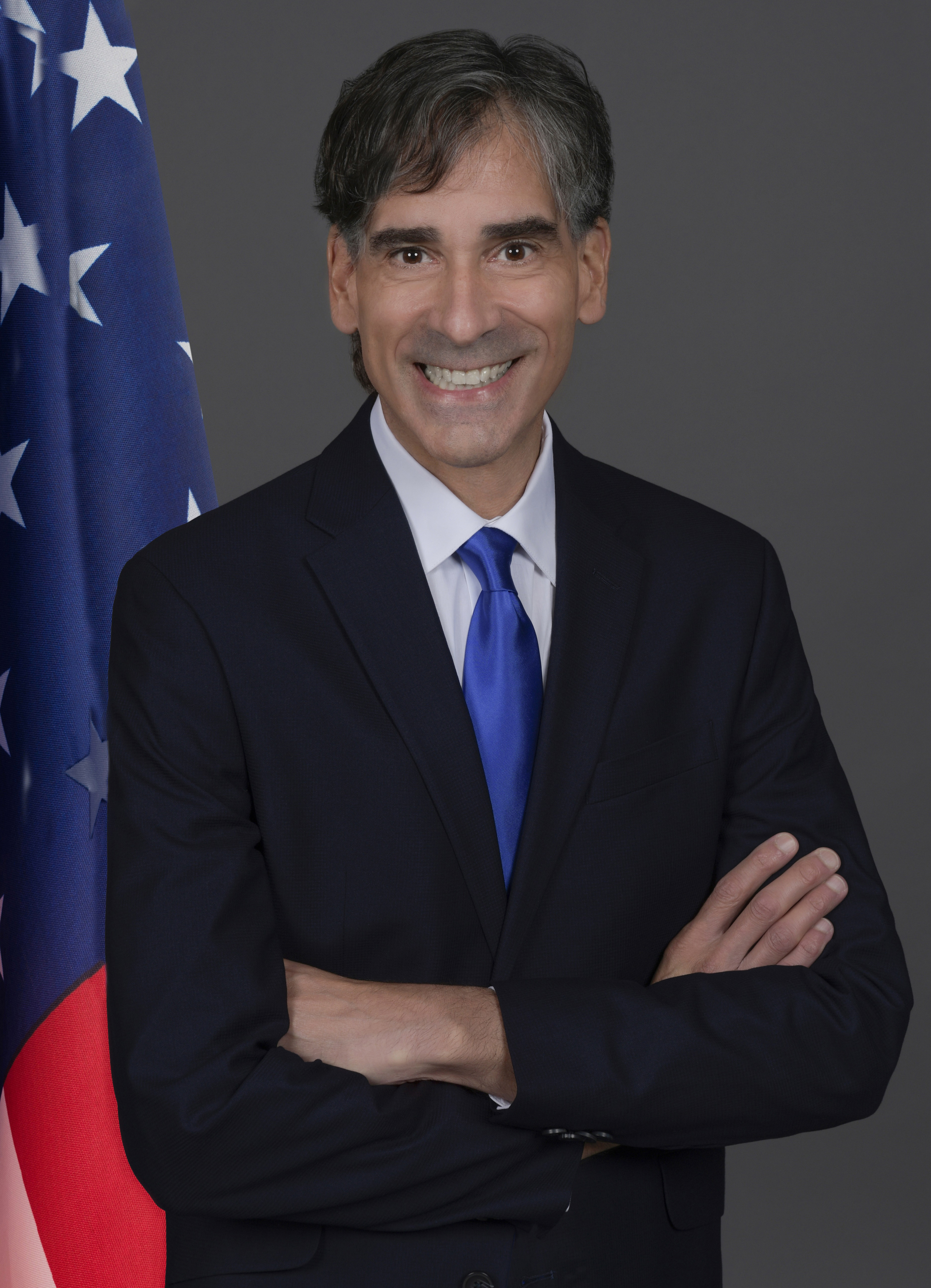

Director of the Bureau of Justice Statistics
- Incumbent
- Assumed office August 15, 2022
- President: Joe Biden

Personal details
- Born: May 6, 1970 (age 56)
- Spouse: Nicole Leeper Piquero
- Education: University of Maryland, College Park (B.A., M.A., Ph.D.)
- Awards: American Society of Criminology's Young Scholar and E-Mail Mentor of the Year Awards
- Scientific career
- Fields: Criminology
- Workplaces: University of Texas at Dallas; University of Miami
- Thesis: An application of Stafford and Warr's reconceptualization of deterrence to drinking and driving (1996)
- Doctoral advisor: Raymond Paternoster
- Doctoral students: Wesley Jennings

Alexis Russell Piquero (born May 6, 1970) is a Cuban-American criminologist who is professor and chair of the Department of Sociology at the University of Miami, where he is also Arts & Sciences Distinguished Scholar. He previously served as the Ashbel Smith Professor of Criminology at the University of Texas at Dallas (UT Dallas), where he was also the Associate Dean for Graduate Programs in the School of Economic, Political, and Policy Sciences. He has been ranked as the #1 criminologist in the world since 1996 by the number of peer-reviewed papers in criminology journals. In 2015, then-United States Attorney General Eric Holder appointed him to the Office of Justice Programs Science Advisory Board.

== Education and career ==
Piquero received his B.A. in 1992, his M.A. in 1994, and his Ph.D. in 1996. All three of his degrees were in criminology and criminal justice, and he received all of them from the University of Maryland, College Park. After teaching at Florida State University, the University of Maryland, the John Jay College of Criminal Justice, and other institutions, he joined the faculty of UT Dallas in 2011. He left UT Dallas for the University of Miami in 2020, where he first joined the faculty that August.

== Research ==
The subjects Piquero has researched include the link between malnutrition and violence. He has also co-authored a study showing that the arrest rate among National Football League players is lower than that for the American male population aged 20 to 39. He has collaborated on several books, including the Handbook of Quantitative Criminology (edited by David Weisburd).

== Honors and awards ==
Piquero has received the American Society of Criminology's Young Scholar and E-Mail Mentor of the Year Awards. He has also been a fellow of the American Society of Criminology and the Academy of Criminal Justice Sciences since 2011. In 2018, he was inducted as a fellow into the UT System Academy of Distinguished Teachers.

== Editorial activities ==
Piquero serves on the editorial boards of more than a dozen criminology journals. For five years (2008-2013), he was the co-editor of the Journal of Quantitative Criminology.

== Personal life ==
Piquero's parents migrated to the United States from Cuba as exiles in the early 1960s. He is married to his colleague, Nicole Leeper Piquero.
