= John Hipp =

American criminologist

John Ripp
- Education: University of California, Santa Cruz; University of North Carolina, Chapel Hill
- Awards: 2010 Ruth Shonle Cavan Young Scholar Award from the American Society of Criminology
- Scientific career
- Fields: Criminology
- Institutions: University of California, Irvine
- Thesis: Social Distance and Social Change: How Neighborhoods Change over Time (2006)
- Doctoral advisor: Kenneth A. Bollen

John Robert Hipp is an American criminologist and professor in the department of Criminology, Law and Society at the University of California, Irvine (UC Irvine). He is also the co-director, with Charis Kubrin, of the Irvine Lab for the Study of Space and Crime (ILSSC), as well as the director of UC Irvine's Metropolitan Futures Initiative. He has conducted multiple studies of unemployment and crime rates in and around Irvine, California, finding remarkably low rates of both there. His research has also shown that crime in Los Angeles tends to be intraracial, despite the fact that several exceptions received considerable media attention, and that immigration has not led to an increase in crime rates in Southern California.
