= Journal of Drug Issues =

- Discipline: Addiction medicine
- Language: English
- Edited by: Kevin Beaver

Publication details
- History: 1971-present
- Publisher: SAGE Publications in association with the Florida State University College of Criminology and Criminal Justice
- Frequency: Quarterly
- Impact factor: 1.304 (2017)

Standard abbreviations
- ISO 4: J. Drug Issues

Indexing
- CODEN: JDGIA
- ISSN: 0022-0426
- OCLC no.: 1754539

Links
- Journal homepage; Online access; Online archive

The Journal of Drug Issues is a quarterly peer-reviewed medical journal covering the adverse effects of drugs, especially illicit drugs. It was established in 1971 and is published by SAGE Publications in association with the Florida State University College of Criminology and Criminal Justice. The editor-in-chief is Kevin Beaver of the same university. According to the Journal Citation Reports, the journal has a 2017 impact factor of 1.304, ranking it 27th out of 35 journals in the category "Substance Abuse".
