= Andrew Papachristos =

- Born: Chicago, Illinois
- Education: Loyola University of Chicago, University of Chicago
- Known for: Work on gun violence and its transmission
- Awards: 1994 Yoshiyama Award from The Hitachi Foundation, 2012 Ruth Shonle Cavan Young Scholar Award (with Min Xie)
- Scientific career
- Fields: Sociology
- Institutions: Yale University
- Thesis: Murder by structure: a network theory of gang homicide (2007)

Andrew Vasilios Papachristos is an American sociologist, professor of sociology and faculty fellow at the Institute for Policy Research (IPR) at Northwestern University. He is also the director of the Northwestern Neighborhoods & Networks Initiative (N3) that engages communities, civic partners, and policy makers to address core problems facing the residents of Chicago and surrounding communities. He previously served as professor of sociology at Yale University, where he directed the Policy Lab at Yale as well as the Center for Research on Inequalities and the Life Course.

== Education and career ==
A native of Chicago, Illinois, Papachristos received his B.S. summa cum laude from Loyola University of Chicago in 1998, his M.A. from the University of Chicago in 2000, and his Ph.D. in sociology from the University of Chicago in 2007. From 2007 to 2012, he was an assistant, and later associate, professor at the University of Massachusetts, Amherst. From 2010 to 2012, he was a Robert Wood Johnson Foundation Health & Society Scholar at Harvard University. In 2012, he joined the faculty at Yale, where he was promoted to full professor in 2017, serving in the departments of sociology, public health (by courtesy), and at Yale Law School. In 2018, Papachristos joined the faculty of Northwestern University as professor of sociology, faculty fellow at the Institute for Policy Research (IPR), and founding director of the Northwestern Neighborhoods & Networks Initiative (N3).

== Research ==
Papachristos is known for researching gun violence in the United States, and how social networks help spread it. With Christopher Wildeman, he has shown that being a member of a certain social network within a given neighborhood increases the odds of being the victim of homicide by 900%. His research on gun violence has inspired an algorithm used to predict who will become a victim of gun violence in the future, based on nine years of data from Chicago.
