= Claire Lehmann =

Australian writer (born 1985)

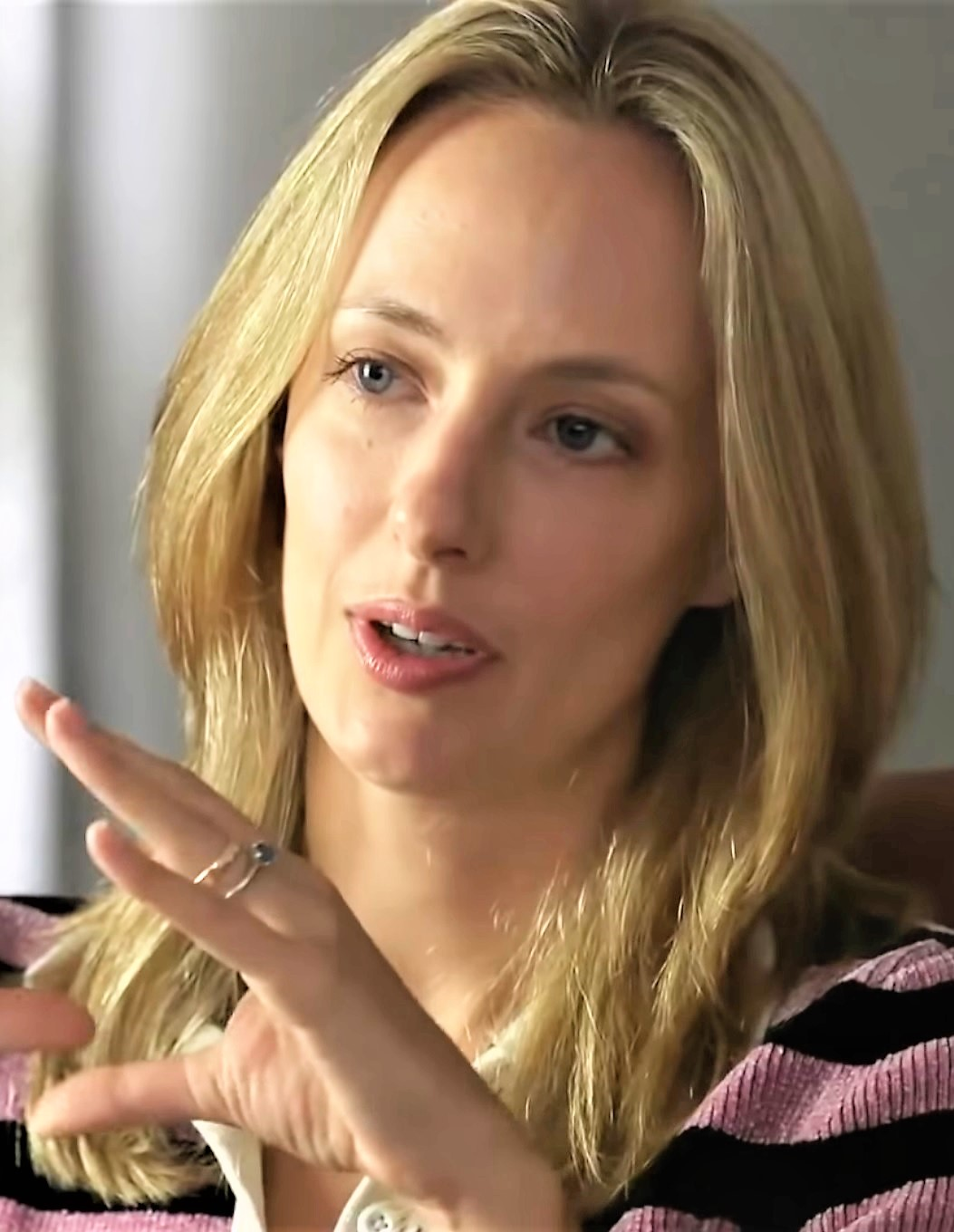
- Lehmann in 2019
- Born: Claire Jensen; 17 July 1985 (age 40); Bundaberg, Australia
- Education: University of Adelaide (BA)
- Known for: Founding editor-in-chief of Quillette magazine

Claire Lehmann (née Jensen; born 17 July 1985) is an Australian journalist, publisher, and the founding editor of Quillette.

== Early life and family ==
Lehmann was born in Bundaberg on 17 July 1985. She is the daughter of a former teacher and a speech pathologist who was raised in Adelaide, South Australia. She graduated with a bachelor's degree in psychology and English from the University of Adelaide with first-class honours in 2010. Lehmann was then a graduate student in psychology, but dropped out after having a child. She is married and has two children. She is the daughter-in-law of the poet Geoffrey Lehmann.

== Career ==
Lehmann founded the online magazine Quillette in October 2015. According to the newspaper The Australian, Lehmann's story about the controversy surrounding Google engineer James Damore precipitated the venture's success.

Lehmann has contributed to publications including The Guardian, Scientific American, Tablet, and ABC News. She is a columnist at The Australian and is a contributing writer at The Dispatch.

Bari Weiss regards Lehmann as one of the leaders of the so-called "intellectual dark web" (IDW). Lehmann is seen as part of the IDW due to publishing Quillette which Politico has referred to as "the unofficial digest of the IDW" which "prides itself on publishing 'dangerous' ideas other outlets won't touch", and criticising "what they see as left-wing orthodoxy".

The Sydney Morning Herald named Lehmann in their "Ten Aussies who shook the world in tech and media in 2018" citing that her online magazine, Quillette, has "attracted as many as 2 million followers a month, [and] is starting to gain significant traction in tech and libertarian circles in the US".

Lehmann co-edited the anthology of essays Panics and Persecutions: 20 Quillette Tales of Excommunication in the Digital Age in 2020.

Lehmann received the 2025 Constance Holden Memorial Award for Distinguished Journalism from the International Society for Intelligence Research at its annual conference held at Northwestern University, where she delivered the Constance Holden Memorial Address titled A Heterodox Education, later published in Quillette.
