= Eric Baumer =

American criminologist

- Education: Truman State University, University of Missouri–St. Louis, University at Albany, SUNY
- Known for: Research on recent crime trends in the United States and the reporting of crime to the police
- Awards: 2003 Ruth Shonle Cavan Young Scholar Award from the American Society of Criminology
- Scientific career
- Fields: Criminology
- Workplaces: University of Missouri–St. Louis, Florida State University, Pennsylvania State University
- Thesis: Neighborhood disadvantage, neighborhood instability, and adolescent behavior: Premarital childbearing, dropping out of school, and delinquency (1998)
- Doctoral advisor: Steven Messner

Eric Paul Baumer is an American criminologist and Professor of Sociology and Criminology at Pennsylvania State University, where he has served as head of the Department of Sociology and Criminology. His research focuses on crime trends in the United States, communities and crime, and the reporting of crime to the police.

== Education and career ==
Baumer received a B.S. in political science from Truman State University and an M.A. in criminology from the University of Missouri–St. Louis, where he also completed his Ph.D. in 1998. He completed additional graduate study at the University at Albany, SUNY, working with the sociologist Steven Messner.

He subsequently held faculty positions at the University of Missouri–St. Louis, where he directed the doctoral program in criminology and criminal justice, and at Florida State University, where he was the Allen E. Liska Professor of Criminology in the College of Criminology and Criminal Justice. He joined Pennsylvania State University as Professor of Sociology and Criminology in 2015.

== Awards ==
- Ruth Shonle Cavan Young Scholar Award, American Society of Criminology (2003)
- Fellow, American Society of Criminology (2016)

== Research ==
Baumer's work addresses the long-term decline in crime in the United States, neighborhood and community influences on crime, and the factors that affect whether victims report crime to the police. He has received research funding from agencies including the National Science Foundation and the National Institute of Justice for studies on disparities in incarceration and on the relationship between home foreclosure and crime rates.
