= Justice Quarterly =

- Discipline: Criminal justice
- Language: English
- Edited by: Joshua C. Cochran and Daniel P. Mears

Publication details
- History: 1984-present
- Publisher: Routledge
- Frequency: Quarterly
- Impact factor: 3.214 (2018)

Standard abbreviations
- ISO 4: Justice Q.

Indexing
- ISSN: 0741-8825 (print); 1745-9109 (web)
- LCCN: 86641355
- OCLC no.: 10232906

Links
- Journal homepage; Online access; Online archive

Justice Quarterly is a quarterly peer-reviewed academic journal covering criminology and criminal justice. It was established in 1982 and is published by Routledge on behalf of the Academy of Criminal Justice Sciences, of which it is an official journal. The editors-in-chief are Joshua C. Cochran (University of Cincinnati) and Daniel P. Mears (Florida State University). According to the Journal Citation Reports, the journal has a 2018 impact factor of 3.214.
