= Matt DeLisi =

American sociologist

- Education: B.A., Syracuse University, PhD, University of Colorado
- Scientific career
- Fields: Sociology, criminology
- Workplaces: Iowa State University
- Thesis: 1000 criminal careers: explaining habitual criminal offending (2000)

Matthew DeLisi is an American criminologist, author, forensic consultant, and Distinguished Professor in the Department of Sociology and Criminal Justice at Iowa State University, where he is also Coordinator of Criminal Justice and a faculty affiliate of the Center for the Study of Violence.

== Education ==
DeLisi received his B.A. in Policy Studies from Syracuse University and his Ph.D. in Sociology from the University of Colorado.

== Research ==
DeLisi's research focuses on multiple areas in the field of criminology, such as career criminals, homicide, temperament, inmate behavior, adverse childhood experiences, developmental psychopathology, psychopathy, and the self-control theory of crime. He has published studies on the economic costs of murders in the United States and on the relationship between violent video games and criminal behavior.

His books include:

• Matt DeLisi. (2005). Career Criminals in Society. Thousand Oaks, CA: Sage.

• Matt DeLisi. (2006). Criminal Justice: Balancing Crime Control and Due Process. Dubuque, IA: Kendall/Hunt. Second Edition. (2008). Third Edition. (2011). Fourth Edition. (2018).

• Matt DeLisi. (2013). Criminal Psychology. San Diego, CA: Bridgepoint Education.

• Matt DeLisi. (2015). Homicide. Dubuque, IA: Kendall/Hunt. Second edition. (2020).

• Matt DeLisi. (2016). Psychopathy as Unified Theory of Crime. New York, NY: Palgrave Macmillan.

• Matt DeLisi. (Ed.). (2019). The Routledge International Handbook of Psychopathy and Crime. New York, NY: Routledge.

• Robert M. Regoli, John D. Hewitt, and Matt DeLisi. (2008). Delinquency in Society: Youth Crime in the 21st Century, Seventh Edition. New York, NY: McGraw-Hill. (8th edition, 2010); 9th edition, 2013; 10th edition, 2016; 11th edition, 2021. Burlington, MA: Jones & Bartlett.

• Robert M. Regoli, John D. Hewitt, and Matt DeLisi. (2011). Delinquency in Society: The Essentials. Boston, MA: Jones & Bartlett.

• Chad R. Trulson, Darin R. Haerle, Jonathan W. Caudill, and Matt DeLisi. (2016). Lost Causes: Blended Sentencing, Second Chances, and the Texas Youth Commission. Austin, TX: University of Texas Press.

• Alexander T. Vazsonyi, Daniel J. Flannery, and Matt DeLisi (Eds.). (2018). The Cambridge Handbook of Violent Behavior and Aggression, second edition. New York, NY: Cambridge University Press.

• John Paul Wright and Matt DeLisi. (2015). Conservative Criminology: A Call to Restore Balance to the Social Sciences. New York, NY: Routledge.

• Matt DeLisi and Michael G. Vaughn. (Eds.). (2015). The Routledge International Handbook of Biosocial Criminology. New York, NY: Routledge.

• Matt DeLisi and Michael G. Vaughn. (Eds.). (2015). Biosocial Criminology: Critical Concepts in Criminology (Volumes I-IV). New York, NY: Routledge. Volume I: Conceptual and Empirical Foundations Volume II: Neurological Approaches Volume III: Genetic Approaches Volume IV: Socio-Legal and Criminal Justice Applications

• Michael G. Vaughn, Matt DeLisi, and Holly C. Matto. (2014). Human Behavior: A Cell to Society Approach. Hoboken, NJ: John Wiley & Sons.

• Matt DeLisi and Kevin M. Beaver (Eds.). (2011). Criminological Theory: A Life-Course Approach. Boston, MA: Jones & Bartlett. Second Edition. (2014).

• Matt DeLisi and Peter J. Conis. (2009). American Corrections: Theory, Research, Policy, and Practice. Sudbury, MA: Jones & Bartlett. Second Edition. (2012). Third Edition. (2018).

• Matt DeLisi and Peter J. Conis (Eds.). (2008). Violent Offenders: Theory, Research, Public Policy, and Practice. Sudbury, MA: Jones & Bartlett. Second Edition. (2012). Third Edition. (2018).

== Honors, awards and editorial activities ==
DeLisi received numerous awards for teaching excellence and research achievement. DeLisi has been a Fellow of the Academy of Criminal Justice Sciences since 2012. In 2026, he was elected a fellow of an American Association for the Advancement of Science.
