= Raymond Mack =

American sociologist

Raymond W. Mack
- Born: Raymond Wright Mack; July 15, 1927; Ashtabula, Ohio, U.S.
- Died: August 25, 2011 (aged 84); Chapel Hill, North Carolina, U.S.
- Education: Baldwin-Wallace College; University of North Carolina
- Known for: Research on race relations
- Spouse: Ann
- Children: Donald; Meredith; Margaret Hart; Julia
- Scientific career
- Fields: Sociology
- Institutions: Northwestern University
- Thesis: The Prestige System of an Air Base: Squadron Ranking and Morale (1953)
- Doctoral students: Troy Duster

Raymond Wright Mack (July 15, 1927 – August 25, 2011) was an American sociologist known for his work on race relations and social inequality. He was the chair of the sociology department at Northwestern University from 1959 to 1967, and co-founded the Center for Urban Affairs there in 1968. He served as the center's director from then to 1971, as vice president and Dean of Faculties at Northwestern from 1971 to 1974, and as provost of the university from 1974 to 1987.
