= Raymond Paternoster =

American criminologist

- Born: February 29, 1952
- Died: March 5, 2017 (aged 65)
- Education: University of Delaware (B.A., 1972), Southern Illinois University (M.S., 1975), Florida State University (Ph.D., 1978)
- Known for: Research on racial bias in capital punishment
- Spouse: Ronet Bachman
- Children: John Bachman-Paternoster
- Scientific career
- Fields: Criminology
- Institutions: University of Maryland
- Thesis: The Labeling Effects of Police Apprehension: Identity, Exclusion and Secondary Deviance (1978)

Raymond Paternoster (February 29, 1952 – March 5, 2017) was an American criminologist who taught at the University of Maryland from 1982 until his death in 2017.

== Education ==
Paternoster received his bachelor's degree from the University of Delaware in 1973, his master's from Southern Illinois University in 1975, and his Ph.D. from Florida State University in 1978.

== Career ==
Paternoster joined the faculty of the University of South Carolina as an assistant professor in 1978. He joined the faculty of the University of Maryland in 1982 and subsequently became a full professor there in 1990.

== Research ==
Paternoster was known for his research on racial disparities in the application of capital punishment in the United States. This research includes a study of racial bias in Maryland's death penalty, commissioned by the state's then-governor, Parris N. Glendening. Paternoster then spent 2 and a half years analyzing data before releasing the study in 2003. The study reported that black defendants who killed whites were much more likely to be sentenced to death than defendants who killed blacks, whether the defendants were black or white. In a 2006 dissent, Maryland Court of Appeals Chief Judge Robert M. Bell cited Paternoster's research on this topic as evidence that capital punishment in Maryland was biased against blacks. In his dissent in a case brought by death row inmate Vernon Evans, Jr., Bell wrote, "The Paternoster study provides substantial evidence that the Baltimore County State's Attorney's Office singled out black defendants from similarly situated white defendants when choosing against whom to seek the death penalty."
