= Charles Wellford =

American criminologist and emeritus professor

- Born: Charles Franklin Wellford; Laurel, MD
- Education: University of Maryland, College Park; University of Pennsylvania
- Awards: Fellow of the American Society of Criminology, Vollmer award recipient, merit awards USDOJ, Lifetime National Associate NAS, University of Maryland President's Medal (2011)
- Scientific career
- Fields: Criminology
- Institutions: Florida State University. Westinghouse Research Center, US Department of Justice; University of Maryland, College Park
- Thesis: A sociometric analysis of a correctional community (1969)

Charles Franklin Wellford is an American criminologist, emeritus professor in the Department of Criminology and Criminal Justice at the University of Maryland–College Park. He previously served as the department's chair. In 1996, the Department of Criminology and Criminal Justice established the Charles Wellford Fellowship in his honor. He was chair of the University of Maryland's Athletic Council from 1995 to 2008. He was the president of the American Society of Criminology (ASC) during 1995–96. In addition he was the research director for the National Issues Center at Westinghouse Corporation, director of the Federal Justice Research Program, Director of the Maryland Justice Analysis Center, Director of the Center for Applied Studies, Director of the Office of Academic Computing, Dean of Graduate Studies and Research and Dean of Continuing and Extended Education. He twice served as the President of the Atlantic Coast Conference and served on the Championship Cabinet and Management Council of the NCAA.

== Education ==
Wellford received his bachelor's degree from the University of Maryland in 1961, where he received his master's degree in 1963. In 1969, he received his Ph.D. under the direction of Philip C. Sagi from the University of Pennsylvania.

== Career ==
Wellford first served as a social scientist at the National Institute of Justice. He then was as assistant professor at the University of Maryland and associate professor at Florida State University. He then directed major crime projects at the Westinghouse National Issues Center before moving to work in the Office of the US Attorney General. There he helped develop the plan for the Bureau of Justice Statistics and, as Director of the Federal Justice Research Program, directed research projects on federal sentencing, civil justice and other topics. In 1981 he rejoined the faculty at the University of Maryland and led it to be recognized as the top ranked department of Criminology and Criminal Justice in the US. He is known for research on prison culture, sentencing reform, theory testing, crime measurement and variations in the clearance rate of homicides throughout the United States. For example, a 2001 study he authored concluded that the probability of a killing being solved by law enforcement was primarily influenced by the actions of police officers and the structure and management of police agencies.

== Honors and awards ==
Wellford was elected as a fellow of the American Society of Criminology in 1996. In 2011, he received the University of Maryland President's Medal. In 2001 he was recognized as the first criminologist to be designated a Lifetime National Associate by the National Academy of Sciences. He was awarded the Block Award (1990) for service to Criminology and the Vollmer Award (2018 for contributions to justice) by the ASC.
