= Brian Boutwell =

American criminologist

- Education: Florida State University (BS, MS, PhD)
- Scientific career
- Fields: Criminology; Behavior genetics
- Institutions: Saint Louis University; Sam Houston State University; University of Mississippi
- Thesis: School-Level Moderators of Genetic Influences on Antisocial Behaviors (2010)
- Doctoral advisor: Kevin Beaver

Brian B. Boutwell is an American criminologist and Associate Professor of Criminal Justice & Legal Studies at the University of Mississippi.

== Career ==
Boutwell has conducted research on the intelligence quotient of psychopaths, finding that their average IQ is lower than the general population. This research has been published the journal European Journal of Personality. He has been an associate professor at the University of Mississippi since the summer of 2019.

Boutwell has written articles for Quillette on the nature vs nuture, the genetics of race, and other topics.
