= Biosocial theory =

Theory in behavioral and social science

Biosocial theory is a theory in behavioral and social science that describes personality disorders and mental illnesses and disabilities as biologically-determined personality traits reacting to environmental stimuli.

Biosocial theory also explains the shift from evolution to culture when it comes to gender and mate selection. Biosocial theory in motivational psychology identifies the differences between males and females concerning physical strength and reproductive capacity, and how these differences interact with expectations from society about social roles. This interaction produces the differences we see in gender.

== Description ==
M. M. Linehan wrote in her 1993 paper, Cognitive–Behavioral Treatment of Borderline Personality Disorder, that "the biosocial theory suggests that BPD is a disorder of self-regulation, and particularly of emotional regulation, which results from biological irregularities combined with certain dysfunctional environments, as well as from their interaction and transaction over time".

The biological part of the model involves the idea that emotional sensitivity is inborn. As we have different sensitivities in our pain tolerance, in our skin, or in our digestion, we also have different sensitivities to our emotional reactions. This is part of our genetic makeup, but this alone does not cause difficulties or pathologies. It is the transaction between the biological and the social part, especially with invalidating environments, that brings problems. An invalidating environment is one in which the individuals do not fit, so it invalidates their emotions and experiences. It does not need to be an abusive environment; invalidation can occur in subtle ways. Emotional sensitivity plus invalidating environments cause pervasive emotion dysregulation which is the font of many psychopathologies.

According to a 1999 article published by McLean Hospital,

DBT is based on a biosocial theory of personality functioning in which BPD is seen as a biological disorder of emotional regulation. The disorder is characterized by heightened sensitivity to emotion, increased emotional in-tensity [sic] and a slow return to emotional baseline. Characteristic behaviors and emotional experiences associated with BPD theoretically result from the expression of this biological dysfunction in a social environment experienced as invalidating by the borderline patient.

== See also ==
- Biocultural anthropology
- Biosocial criminology
- Sociobiology
