= Quillette =

Australian online magazine

- Editor-in-chief: Claire Lehmann
- Senior editor, London: Jamie Palmer
- Canadian editor, Toronto: Jonathan Kay
- Categories: Politics; culture; science; technology
- Founder: Claire Lehmann
- Founded: 2015; 11 years ago
- Country: Australia
- Based in: Sydney
- Language: English
- Website: quillette.com

Quillette (/kwɪˈlɛt/) is an online magazine founded by Australian journalist Claire Lehmann. The magazine primarily focuses on science, technology, news, culture, and politics.

Quillette was created in 2015 to focus on scientific topics, but has come to focus on coverage of political and cultural issues concerning freedom of speech and identity politics. It has been described as libertarian-leaning. The Columbia Journalism Review has called Quillette "the right wing's highly influential answer to Slate", Holly High and Joshua Reno have criticised it as an "anti-PC soapbox", and Sarah Jones of New York's Intelligencer has described it as "reflexively contrarian".

== History ==
Quillette was founded in October 2015 in Sydney, Australia, by Claire Lehmann. It is named after the French word "quillette", a withy cutting planted so that it takes root—used here as a metaphor for an essay. Lehmann stated that Quillette was created with the aim of "setting up a space where we could critique the blank slate orthodoxy"—a theory of human development which assumes individuals are largely products of nurture, not nature—but that it "naturally evolved into a place where people critique other aspects of what they see as left-wing orthodoxy".

In August 2017, Quillette published an article in which five academics expressed support for James Damore, author of the memo "Google's Ideological Echo Chamber". According to Politico, Quillette's website crashed because of the popularity of the article. Lehmann was told by her tech staff that the cause may have been a DDoS attack. In its profile of Quillette, Politico reported that Lehmann knew about the grievance studies affair before it was first reported in October 2018. In response, Quillette again published comments from five like-minded academics.

In May 2019, Quillette published an article alleging connections between antifa activists and national-level reporters who cover the far-right, based on the accounts these reporters followed on Twitter. Alexander Reid Ross and another journalist who were mentioned in the article said that they and other journalists received death threats after the claims were published.

In August 2019, Quillette published a hoax article titled "DSA Is Doomed" submitted by an anonymous writer claiming to be a construction worker named Archie Carter who was critical of the organisation Democratic Socialists of America. The magazine retracted the article after the hoax was brought to its attention.

Quillette has published articles supporting the pseudoscientific human biodiversity movement (HBD), by writers such as Brian Boutwell and John Paul Wright, HBD being a euphemism for eugenics and scientific racism. Quillette published articles supporting Noah Carl who "was excluded from a Cambridge University fellowship over his alleged links to far-right organisations, including collaborating in writing projects with far-right activist Emil Kirkegaard, and for engaging in unethical and dishonest research supporting eugenicist views".

== Reception ==
In an article for The Outline, writer Gaby Del Valle classifies Quillette as "libertarian-leaning", "academia-focused" and "a hub for reactionary thought." In the Seattle newspaper The Stranger, Katie Herzog writes that it has won praise "from both Steven Pinker and Richard Dawkins", adding that "most of the contributors are academics but the site reads more like a well researched opinion section than an academic journal". In an opinion piece for USA Today, columnist Cathy Young describes Quillette as "libertarian-leaning". An article in Vice described Quillette as a "libertarian magazine".

Amelia Lester of Politico Magazine and Vox have reported that Quillette has been associated with the "intellectual dark web", a term used, according to Ms. Lester, to describe "a loose cadre of academics, journalists and tech entrepreneurs who view themselves as standing up to the knee-jerk left-leaning politics of academia and the media." Writing for The New York Times, Bari Weiss referred to Claire Lehmann as a figure in the "intellectual dark web".

Writing for The Guardian, Jason Wilson describes Quillette as "a website obsessed with the alleged war on free speech on campus". Writing for The Washington Post, Aaron Hanlon describes Quillette as a "magazine obsessed with the evils of 'critical theory' and postmodernism".

Writing for New York magazine's column The Daily Intelligencer Andrew Sullivan described Quillette as "refreshingly heterodox" in 2018.

In a piece for Slate, Daniel Engber suggested that while some of its output was "excellent and interesting", the average Quillette story "is dogmatic, repetitious, and a bore". He wrote that it describes "even modest harms inflicted via groupthink—e.g., dropped theater projects, flagging book sales, condemnatory tweets—as 'serious adversity'", arguing that various authors in Quillette engage in the same victim mentality that they attempt to criticise. In an article for The Daily Beast, writer Alex Leo described Quillette as "a site that fancies itself intellectually contrarian but mostly publishes right-wing talking points couched in grievance politics".

== See also ==
- Contrarianism
- Heterodox Academy
- Helen Pluckrose § Areo Magazine
