= National Criminal Justice Association =

The National Criminal Justice Association (NCJA) is a Washington, D.C. based organization that represents a variety of local, state, and tribal governments on crime prevention and control issues. The organization primarily works as a public policy liaison that promotes understanding of the best criminal justice practices between federal and state governments.

== Structure ==
=== Advisory Council ===
The NCJA is governed by the NCJA Advisory Council, which is composed of high level state and tribal officials from their respective jurisdictions. Members on the council are elected by the general NCJA membership, with members from each of the four regions of the United States. The Advisory Council in turn elects 16 members to the Board of Directors to oversee NCJA activities. Members of the Advisory Council are listed on the NCJA website.

== Policy Statements ==
The NCJA's positions on criminal justice policy, as approved by the NCJA Advisory Council, are posted on their website.

=== Improving Public Safety and Ensuring Justice ===
The NCJA believes that the safety and security of the public, and of the public's constitutional protections are fundamental to the American Criminal Justice System. Adequate funding that is used effectively is seen as essential.

=== Addressing Fear and Violence in Communities ===
The NCJA encourages collaboration to combat fear of violence in communities.

=== Addressing Prison Overcrowding ===
The NCJA say that while prisons are necessary components of the criminal justice system, alternative sentencing options are important for relieving prison overcrowding, especially for non-violent offenders. Also, prisons should adequately address public and mental health concerns as institutions of last resort for individuals who need treatment in a prison institution.

=== Victim Assistance ===
The NCJA believes that crime victims must be treated with fairness, respect and dignity, and have any further harm from their involvement in the justice system prevented.

Crime Victims should have guaranteed rights, including "the right to privacy, to protection from intimidation, to case status information, to recovery of reasonable reparation, and to due process within justice proceedings."

=== Juvenile Crime and the Prevention of Juvenile Crime ===
The NCJA supports the Juvenile Justice and Delinquency Prevention Act. Juvenile Justice practices should strengthen families, support core social institutions, provide strategic investments for proven prevention strategies, and should be able to effectively intervene when delinquency occurs. Adequate resources must also be present for Juvenile Justice programs to be effective.

=== Federal Funding Strategies ===
The NCJA say that federal funds in criminal justice, primarily distributed by the Department of Justice, the Department of Homeland Security, the Department of Health and Human Services and other executive agencies help to assure the public that criminal justice problems are being addressed. Data-driven strategies that assess program effectiveness and accountability of grantees are necessary for effective use of funding.

=== Drugs and Substance Abuse ===
The NCJA states that public safety is improved by reducing the access and availability of illicit drugs. Government and other policy makers should collaborate to find the most appropriate criminal justice response.

=== Prisoner Re-entry ===
The goals of prisoner reentry programs according to the NCJA should be job training, employment, housing and treatment. "Because most incarcerated offenders eventually return to local communities, their failure to remain crime free often threatens public safety." Re-entry programs should also help to reduce the number of repeat offenders in the system, reducing the overall prison population over time. Successful re-entry programs should also focus on community ties and close supervision.

Over 600,000 prisoners are released into society each year, and they face many problems and obstacles with society and with themselves. It is harder for them to find work, housing, education, and have normal social relationships. Those who are not welcomed home by their families and aided by agencies have an even harder time adjusting to their new lives, and most will find that they fail at leading law-abiding lives. Re-entry programs are extremely vital to reducing the rates of recidivism and lowering the costs of incarceration. It would be in the best interests financially to invest in re-entry programs for prisoners with the intent of lowering the rates of offenders who return to prison, versus dealing with the extremely high costs of prisons and the number of prisoners that they hold. Re-entry programs are important not only after the prisoner is released, but before as well. Treatment in prison is the first step in helping a prisoner, but not enough prisoners actually go through a program, and are then at a higher risk for failing within the first year once they leave prison.

=== Information Technology ===
According to the NCJA there is a critical need for all public safety agencies to collect, analyze, and share information involving criminal justice data and trends.

Investments in technology should also adhere to federal and state standards, especially the National Information Exchange Model and Global Information Sharing Initiative.

The use of technology should not affect the rights and privacy of individuals, and confidentiality of records should be maintained.

=== Racial Disparity in the Criminal Justice System ===
The NCJA believe that the over-representation of victims of color and under-representation of minority professionals employed within the criminal justice system are issues that need to be addressed and present significant challenges for the justice system. Criminal Justice professionals should strive to have administration be representative of the population they serve, as well as work to seek out effective measures to reduce over-representation of minority victims and offenders in the criminal justice system.

=== Mentally Ill Persons in the Criminal Justice System ===
The NCJA states that prison systems are ill-equipped to address the problems and needs of inmates with mental disorders.

As recommendations to the justice system, the NCJA says that "early identification and treatment, law enforcement and correctional officer training, provision of housing, adequate discharge medication amounts, and standardized assessment and diagnostic tools" are necessary for inmates who are mentally ill. Policy makers, law enforcement, and mental health providers should work together to determine what practices and methods of implementation are most effective in dealing with mentally ill inmates.

=== Tribal Nations and the Criminal Justice System ===
The NCJA is an advocate for the respect of tribal justice systems and tribal nations’ sovereignty. "Criminal justice and tribal justice systems should cooperate in matters of mutual concern, on an individual tribal basis, as appropriate." Governments should work with tribal governments based on their individual and cultural needs.

== Role in Criminal Justice Policy ==
=== Public Policy Liaison ===
The primary role of the NCJA in public policy is as a liaison between federal and state, local, and tribal government for criminal justice issues. Expressing state, local, and tribal concerns to the federal government to prevent and reduce the harmful effects of criminal and delinquent behavior is a part of its mission statement.

==== Identifying Promising Practices ====
The NCJA actively "seeks exemplary programs that significantly improve the administration of justice." An example of a program that has received an award from the NCJA is the Berks County (PA) Community Reentry Program.

=== Membership ===
The NCJA primarily serves their organization's members through benefits such as the Justice Bulletin, a weekly news letter detailing congressional updates and criminal justice research; Connect2Grants, a weekly publishing and searchable, comprehensive database of the availability of funding for criminal justice initiatives; and through National Conferences and Policy Forums, which allow for networking among criminal justice practitioners, updates on emerging criminal justice issues and practices, and information on criminal justice policy, among other things.
