= Biosocial criminology =

Psychosocial examination of crime

Biosocial criminology is an interdisciplinary field that aims to explain crime and antisocial behavior by exploring biocultural factors. While contemporary criminology has been dominated by sociological theories, biosocial criminology also recognizes the potential contributions of fields such as behavioral genetics, neuropsychology, and evolutionary psychology.

== Approaches ==
=== Environment ===
Environment has a significant effect on genetic expression. Disadvantaged environments enhance antisocial gene expression, suppress prosocial gene action and prevent the realization of genetic potential.

Genes and environments operating in tandem (interacting) were required to produce significant antisocial behavior, while neither was powerful enough to produce it independent of the other. That is, children genetically at risk for antisocial behavior reared in positive family environments did not display antisocial behavior, and children not at genetic risk did not become antisocial in adverse family environments.

=== Behavioral genetics ===
One approach to studying the role of genetics for crime is to calculate the heritability coefficient, which describes the proportion of the variance that is due to actualized genetic effects for some trait in a given population in a specific environment at a specific time. According to Kevin Beaver and Anthony Walsh, the heritability coefficient for antisocial behavior is estimated to be between 0.40 and 0.58.

The methodology often used in biosocial criminology (that of twin studies) has been criticized for producing inflated heritability estimates, though biosocial criminologists maintain that these criticisms are baseless. Criminal justice researchers Brian Boutwell and J.C. Barnes argue that many sociological studies that do not control for genetic inheritance of risk factors have misleading or unreliable results.

=== Neurophysiology ===
Another approach is to examine the relationship between neurophysiology and criminality. One example is that measured levels of neurotransmitters such as serotonin and dopamine have been associated with criminal behavior. Another is that neuroimaging studies give strong evidence that both brain structure and function are involved in criminal behaviors. The limbic system creates emotions such as anger and jealousy that ultimately may cause criminal behavior. The prefrontal cortex is involved in delaying gratification and impulse control and moderates the impulses from the limbic system. If this balance is shifted in favor of the limbic system this may contribute to criminal behavior. Terrie Moffitt's developmental theory of crime argues that "life-course-persistent offenders" make up only 6% of the population but commits more than 50% of all crimes and that this is due to a combination neurophysiological deficits and an adverse environment that creates a criminal path that is very difficult to break once started.

=== Evolutionary psychology ===
Men can potentially have many children with little effort; women only a few with great effort. One argued consequence of this is that males are more aggressive, and more violently aggressive, than females, since they face higher reproductive competition from their own sex than females. In particular, low-status males may be more likely to remain completely childless. Under such circumstances, it may have been evolutionarily useful to take very high risks and use violent aggression in order to try to increase status and reproductive success rather than become genetically extinct. This may explain why males have higher crime rates than females and why low status and being unmarried is associated with criminality. It may also explain why the degree of income inequality of a society is a better predictor than the absolute income level of the society for male-male homicides; income inequality creates social disparity, while differing average income levels may not do so. Furthermore, competition over females is argued to have been particularly intensive in late adolescence and young adulthood, which is theorized to explain why crime rates are particularly high during this period.

The "evolutionary neuroandrogenic theory" focuses on the hormone testosterone as a factor influencing aggression and criminality and being beneficial during certain forms of competition. In most species, males are more aggressive than females. Castration of males usually has a pacifying effect on aggressive behavior in males. In humans, males engage in crime and especially violent crime more than females. The involvement in crime usually rises in the early teens to mid teens in correlation with the rise of testosterone levels. Research on the relationship between testosterone and aggression is difficult since the only reliable measurement of brain testosterone is by lumbar puncture, which is not done for research purposes. Studies therefore have often instead used less reliable measurements from blood or saliva. Some studies support a link between adult criminality and testosterone, although the relationship is modest if examined separately for each sex. A significant link between juvenile delinquency and testosterone levels has not been established. Some studies have also found testosterone to be associated with behaviors or personality traits linked with criminality such as antisocial behavior and alcoholism. Many studies have also been done on the relationship between more general aggressive behavior/feelings and testosterone. About half the studies have found a relationship and about half no relationship.

Many conflicts causing homicides involve status conflicts, protecting reputation, and seemingly trivial insults. Steven Pinker in his book The Blank Slate argues that in non-state societies without a police it was very important to have a credible deterrence against aggression. Therefore, it was important to have a reputation for retaliation, causing humans to develop instincts for revenge as well as for protecting reputation ("honor"). Pinker argues that the development of the state and the police have dramatically reduced the level of violence compared to the ancestral environment. Whenever the state breaks down, which can be very locally such as in poor areas of a city, humans again organize in groups for protection and aggression and concepts such as violent revenge and protecting honor again become extremely important.

Some cultures place greater emphasis on protecting honor than other cultures. One explanation is that protecting honor was in the ancestral past relatively more important for herders than for farmers. The livestock of herders were easily and quickly stolen. As a result, it was important to constantly show toughness as a deterrence, which may cause a higher level of violence. The predictions of the theory was confirmed in a cross-cultural examination of traditional farming and herding Spanish-American societies. However, the prediction that sedentary fishing societies would place a low emphasis on honor was not confirmed.

The degree of cultural collectivism is strongly associated with the burden of infectious disease. It has been argued that this is due to collectivism and associated characteristics such as out-group avoidance limiting the spread of infectious diseases. Other characteristics such as strong in-group–out-group bias and willingness to defend the ingroup's honor may promote violence. A study found strong associations between several forms of violent criminal behavior and both infectious disease rates across U.S states and degree of cultural collectivism across U.S. states. The associations remained strong after controlling for income inequality.

==== Specific forms ====
Evolutionary psychology researchers have proposed several evolutionary explanations for psychopathy. One is that psychopathy represents a frequency-dependent, socially parasitic strategy. This may benefit the psychopath as long as there are few other psychopaths in the community since more psychopaths means increasing the risk of encountering another psychopath as well as non-psychopaths likely adapting more countermeasures against cheaters.

Sociobiological theories of rape are theories that explore to what degree, if any, evolutionary adaptations influence the psychology of rapists. Such theories are highly controversial, as traditional theories typically do not consider rape to be a behavioral adaptation. Some object to such theories on ethical, religious, political, as well as scientific grounds. Others argue that a correct knowledge of the causes of rape is necessary in order to develop effective preventive measures.

The Cinderella effect is the alleged higher rate of stepchildren being abused by stepparents as compared to genetic parents, observed in some, but not all, studies. An explanation of this affect has been attempted by application of evolutionary psychology theories. There have also been various criticisms of these theories.

Infanticide is one of the few forms of violence more often done by women than men. Cross-cultural research has found that this is more likely to occur when the child has deformities or illnesses as well as when there are lacking resources due to factors such as poverty, other children requiring resources, and no male support. Such a child may have a low chance of reproductive success, in which case it would decrease the mother's inclusive fitness to spend resources on the child, in particular since women generally have a greater parental investment than men.

==== Criminal justice ====
Punishment of exploitative behaviors harmful to the group was likely a recurring problem in the ancestral environment. As such humans are argued to have developed a range of psychological mechanisms for handling this. Punishment can be a deterrent to undesired behaviors but excessive punishment can also be harmful to the group. Thus, humans are argued to favor a proportional response based on how severe the offence is. Cross-cultural research have a found a high agreement regarding how relatively harmful different crimes are perceived to be. On the other hand, evolutionary novel factors that may be rational to consider from a deterrent perspective, such as how difficult it is for the modern police to detect the crime, do not seem to affect people's perceptions of appropriate punishments.

Once a crime's severity has been judged, there is a choice regarding how to respond. In some cases in the ancestral environment there may have been benefits from future interactions with the offender which some forms of punishment may have prevented as compared to responses such as reparations or rehabilitation. Research suggests that individuals may modify what they think are appropriate forms of response to offenders based on factors that once in the past small-group environment may have indicated that they could personally benefit from continued interactions with the offender such as kinship, in-group or out-group membership, possession of resources, sexual attractiveness, expressed remorse, intentionality, and prior history of cooperation and exploitation.

== See also ==
- Anthropological criminology
- Behavioral genetics
- Biosocial theory
- Evolutionary psychology
- Scientific racism
- Sociobiology
- Statistical correlations of criminal behavior
