= Christopher Wildeman =

American sociologist

Christopher James Wildeman (born October 26, 1979) is an American sociologist and Professor of Sociology at Duke University. Wildeman is known for researching the effects of incarceration on children's health, homelessness, and racial inequality.

== Biography ==
Wildeman was educated at Dickinson College (B.A. in Philosophy, Sociology, and Spanish, 2002) and Princeton University (M.A., 2006; Ph.D., 2008). Both of his graduate degrees were in sociology and demography, and his Ph.D. was supervised by Sara McLanahan, Bruce Western, and Devah Pager. For two years (2008–2010), he was a postdoctoral affiliate at the University of Michigan's Population Studies Center, after which he joined the faculty of Yale University as an assistant professor of sociology. In 2013, he became an associate professor at Yale, and in 2014, he joined the faculty of Cornell as an associate professor. Since 2016, he has also been a research affiliate at the University of Wisconsin, Madison's Institute for Research on Poverty.

== Selected publications ==
- Christopher Wildeman (2009). "Parental Imprisonment, the Prison Boom, and the Concentration of Childhood Disadvantage". Demography. 46 (2): 265–280. doi:10.1353/dem.0.0052. PMC 2831279. PMID 21305393.
- Western, Bruce; Wildeman, Christopher (January 2009). "The Black Family and Mass Incarceration". The Annals of the American Academy of Political and Social Science. 621 (1): 221–242. doi:10.1177/0002716208324850. S2CID 53870729.
- Wakefield, Sara; Wildeman, Christopher (2013). Children of the prison boom : mass incarceration and the future of American inequality. Oxford University Press. ISBN 9780199989232.
