= University of Cincinnati College of Education Criminal Justice and Human Services =

University of Cincinnati College of Education, Criminal Justice, and Human Services
- Motto: Juncta Juvant (Latin for "Strength in Unity")
- Type: Public (state university)
- Established: 1905
- Dean: Lisa Huffman
- Location: Cincinnati, Ohio, USA
- Campus: Urban
- Website: www.cech.uc.edu

Teachers College building on the main campus

The University of Cincinnati College of Education, Criminal Justice, and Human Services is a college of the University of Cincinnati and is located in Teachers College and Dyer Hall on the university's main campus in Cincinnati, Ohio. The college, referred to as CECH, is composed of four schools: Criminal Justice, Education, Human Services and Information Technology.

Established as the College for Teachers in 1905, it was renamed the College of Education, Criminal Justice & Human Services in 2003. CECH has educated students from all 50 states and 73 countries and offers doctoral, specialist, masters, baccalaureate, associate, and certificate programs leading to careers in teaching, counseling, criminal justice, health promotion, legal assisting, and related academic, leadership, and social service fields. Current enrollment is over 5,000, with 30,133 active alumni. Since opening in 1905, CECH has graduated a total of 37,236 students. CECH has 134 full-time faculty, with a student faculty ratio of 14:1. Sixty-five scholarship types are awarded by CECH to students. In 2009, Teachers College completed a major renovation with improvements to Dyer Hall currently in progress.

== Organizational Units ==
=== School of Criminal Justice ===
- Criminal Justice
- Legal Assistant
- Legal Assisting Technology
- Paralegal Studies

=== School of Education ===
- Curriculum and Instruction
- Early Childhood Education
- Educational Studies
- Instructional Design and Technology
- Literacy and Second Language Studies
- Middle Childhood Education
- Secondary Education
- Signed Language Interpreting
- Special Education
- Teacher Science
- Urban Educational Leadership

=== School of Human Services ===
- Athletic Training
- Counseling
- Health Promotion & Education
- School Psychology
- Sport Administration
- Substance Abuse Counseling

=== School of Information Technology ===
- Information Technology (Networking/Systems, Software Application Development, Cybersecurity Track)

== CECH Centers ==
- Action Research Center
- Arlitt Center for Education, Research, and Sustainability
- CECH PASS-Partner for Achieving School Success
- Center for Criminal Justice Research
- Center for Ecological Counseling
- Center for English as a Second Language
- Center for International Education & Research
- Center for Prevention Studies
- Center for Student Success
- Center for Studies Jewish Education & Culture
- Evaluation Services Center
- FUSION Center
- Literacy Research and Innovation Center
- Office of Assessment and Continuous Improvement
- Student Services Center
- Corrections Institute
- Urban Center for Social Justice, Peace Education & Research
- Economics Center

== Student organizations ==
- Alpha Phi Sigma (Criminal Justice Honor Society)
- CECH Student Ambassadors
- CECH Tribunal
- The Center for the ESL Community
- Criminal Justice Society
- Eta Sigma Gamma (National Health Education Honorary)
- Future Educators Association
- Graduate Education Association
- Graduate Student Association
- Information Technology Student Association
- Kappa Delta Pi (Education Honor Society)
- REHABCATS
- Sport Administration Majors Club
- STEM Club
- Student Council for Exceptional Children
- Students for the Education of Young Children
- Student Organization for Action Research (SOAR)
- Upsilon Chi Chi chapter of Chi Sigma Iota
- Women in Technology
- Cybercrime Cats

== Rankings and recognition ==
The annual survey of America's top graduate schools conducted by U.S. News & World Report ranks CECH overall at 55th in the nation's Education Graduate Programs.

The Division of Criminal Justice was ranked #1 nationally in terms of research productivity, according to the Journal of Criminal Justice. U.S. News & World Report ranks the Division of Criminal Justice's doctoral program as the #3 program in the nation.

The UC Online Master’s in Sport Administration was rated as the #1 online program in North America by SportBusiness Postgraduate Rankings.
