= Florida State University College of Criminology and Criminal Justice =

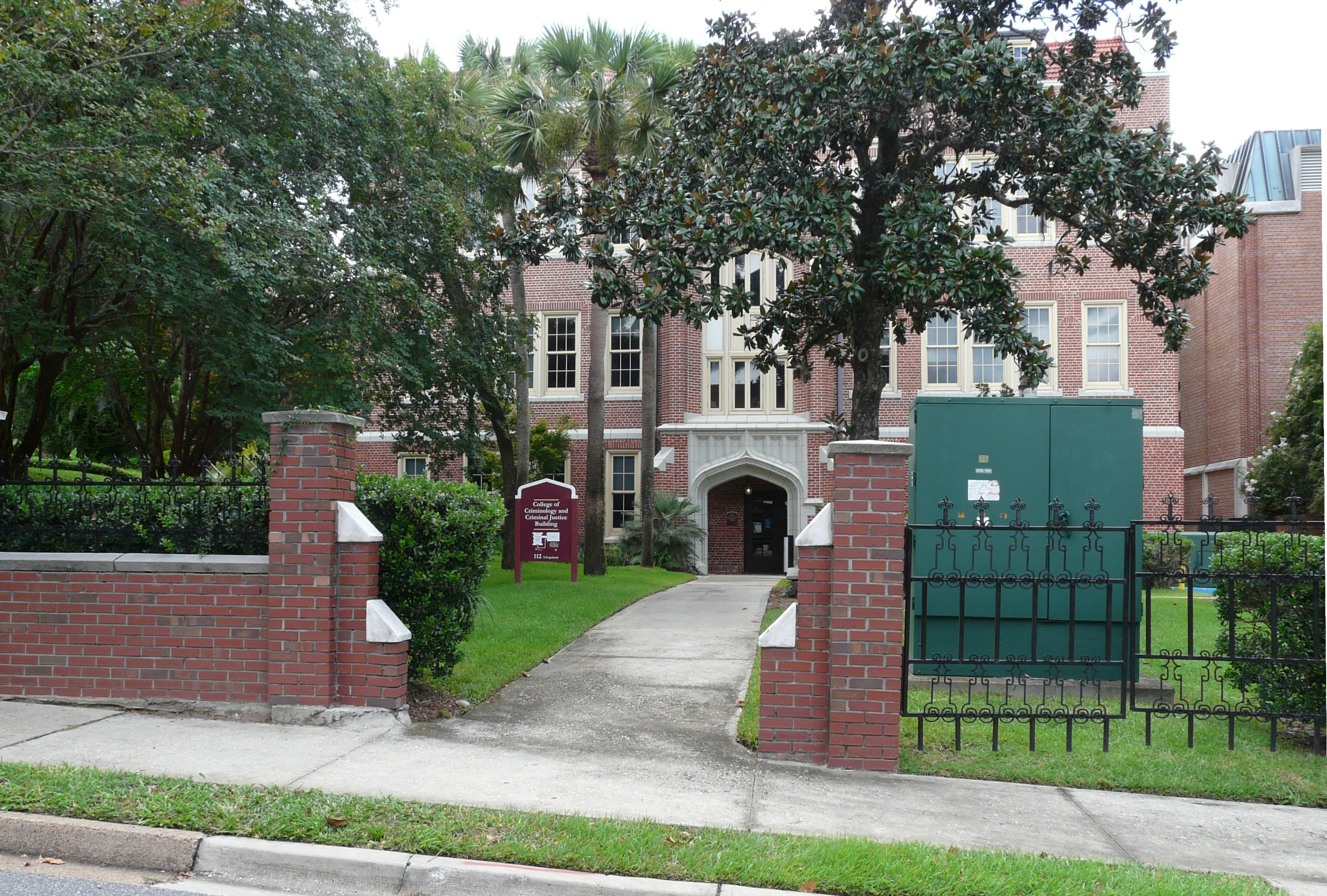
- Type: Public
- Established: 1974
- Dean: Thomas G. Blomberg
- Students: 1,906
- Location: Tallahassee, Florida, U.S.
- Website: www.criminology.fsu.edu

The Florida State University College of Criminology and Criminal Justice is one of sixteen colleges comprising the Florida State University (FSU). The College is the oldest program of its kind. It offers bachelor's, master's, and doctoral degrees.

The College's faculty members lead the nation in funding for education and delinquency research, they conduct the most recognized research on fear and crime, they are known internationally for law enforcement research, they are the most cited for national gun control research, and they are prominent scholars in the areas of self-control and crime and juvenile sentencing.

With $11 million in externally funded research projects, the College's Center for Criminology and Public Policy Research conducts research that promotes evidence-based policy-making and practice at state and national levels. It also provides unique hands-on research opportunities for graduate students.

== History ==
The first offering of criminology courses at Florida State University began in the early 1950s in the Department of Criminology and Corrections within the School of Social Welfare. In 1973, the School of Criminology was established to offer degree programs at the bachelor's, master's, and doctoral levels in criminology. Dr. Eugene Czajkoski, a criminology faculty member receptive to both research and practice, was the School's Founding Dean. Czajkowski served as Dean of the School from 1973 until late 1986.

== National rankings ==
- The online Bachelor's program is ranked #1 in the nation by OnlineU.org.
- The College's faculty is ranked number one in the nation for scholarly productivity, compared to all other criminology doctoral programs in the country, by the Journal of Criminal Justice Education (2011).
- The top two criminologists in the country are faculty members at FSU.
- The online graduate program in criminal justice is ranked #5 by U.S. News & World Report.
- The graduate program is ranked #7 by U.S. News & World Report.
- The online Bachelor's and Master's programs are ranked in the top ten by SuperScholar.org.
- The online Bachelor's program is ranked #2 in the nation by BestColleges.com.
- The online master's degree is ranked in the top ten by TheBestColleges.org.
