= Academy of Criminal Justice Sciences =

The Academy of Criminal Justice Sciences (ACJS) is an international association established in 1963 to foster professional and scholarly activities in the field of criminal justice and criminology. ACJS promotes criminal justice and criminology education, policy analysis, and research for scholars, practitioners, and policymakers. Its national office is located in Greenbelt, Maryland, a suburb of Washington, D.C., in the US.

== Purpose ==
The purpose of ACJS is to promote a forum for disseminating ideas related to issues in education, policy, practice, and research within the field of criminal justice and criminology.

== History ==
By the early 1960s, the American Society of Criminology (ASC), as an organization, had become more focused on the sociological theories of crime causation. Those who had helped to create the organization in order to represent higher education in policing felt left behind. The police professors felt separated from the theoreticians, and they began to discuss amongst themselves what options were available to them. Because there were no longer enough police professors to change ASC from within, as evidenced by the Denver ASC conference, the police professors needed a catalyst for bringing them together to form a new organization. That catalyst came in the retirement of Professor V. A. Leonard from Washington State College (now Washington State University-Pullman). After acknowledging Leonard's retirement, discussion turned to the best way to recognize both Vollmer and Leonard's legacy and the answer was the creation of a new organization, one that was rooted more closely to police science than theoretical criminology: a new organization of police professors. The retirement party for V. A. Leonard in Pullman, Washington, had turned into the first annual conference of the new organization: The International Association of Police Professors (IAPP).

Also, in order to recognize exceptional police science students, the National Criminal Justice Honorary Society, Alpha Phi Sigma (APS), was established. APS was founded by Dr. V. A. Leonard shortly after accepting a position in the Department of Police Science at Washington State University (WSU) in January 1942). By 1976, APS grew to 14 chapters. However, it was not until 1976 that ACJS recognized APS as its Criminal Justice Honorary Society and the two organizations partnered together. A few years later in 1978, APS and ACJS held their annual meetings in conjunction with one another, a practice that is still continued today.

== Membership ==
As of 2020 ACJS has over 1,800 members, from every state in the United States and many other nations, as well as most higher education institutes which teach criminology or criminal justice. Members come from diverse fields of study and differing levels of scholarship, and include students, scholars and practitioners in the criminal justice field.

== Sections ==
As of 2020 ACJS has 13 sections that its members can optionally subscribe to based on their interests:

- Community College
- Corrections
- Critical Criminal Justice
- Drugs and Alcohol Research
- International
- Juvenile Justice and Delinquency
- Law and Public Policy
- Minorities and Women
- Police
- Restorative and Community Justice
- Security and Crime Prevention
- Teaching, Learning, and Scholarship
- Victimology

== ACJS degree program certification ==
ACJS created program certification standards and certification review for academic programs. The goal of these standards and certification review is to measurably improve the quality of criminal justice and criminology education. The certification process is designed to evaluate evidence-based compliance with the nine areas of certification standards: Program Mission and History, Program Structure and Curriculum, Faculty, Admission and Articulation, Resources, Student Services, Integrity, Program Quality and Effectiveness, and Branch Campuses, Additional Locations, and Other Instructional Sites. Programs that are certified have demonstrated through substantive, credible evidence that they have met or exceeded all parts for every standard. Certification is available for Associate, Baccalaureate, and master's degree programs.

== Publications ==
=== Academic journals ===
Justice Quarterly (JQ): JQ is a multi-disciplinary journal focussing on crime and criminal justice issues. It is abstracted or indexed in Social Sciences Citation Index, ISI Alerting Services, Criminal Justice Abstracts, Linguistics and Language Behavior Abstracts and others.

Journal of Criminal Justice Education (JCJE): JCJE's focus is tertiary education in criminal justice, criminology and related areas.

According to its publisher, Springer, the journal Critical Criminology: An International Journal is the official journal of the Critical Criminology Section of ACJS as well as of the Division on Critical Criminology and Social Justice of the American Society of Criminology.

=== Newsletters ===
ACJS Today: The official online newsletter of the Academy, and it contains articles and book reviews applicable to the fields of criminal justice, criminology, sociology, and other related fields.

ACJS Now: Was published twice a year and highlighted current activities of ACJS. This newsletter was discontinued at the end of 2011.
