= FLCCC =

FLCCC may refer to:

- Front Line COVID-19 Critical Care Alliance, a controversial U.S medical organization founded in 2020
- Foot Locker Cross Country Championships
