= Paul E. Marik =

American physician (born 1958)

Paul Ellis Marik
- Born: March 26, 1958 (age 68); Johannesburg, South Africa
- Occupations: Medical practitioner and educator
- Years active: 1989–2021
- Title: Professor of Medicine, with Tenure; EVMS Foundation Distinguished Professorship in Internal Medicine

Academic background
- Education: University of the Witwatersrand (MBBCh, M.Med, BSc Hons, Diplom); College of Medicine of South Africa (Diplom)
- Alma mater: University of the Witwatersrand
- Thesis: Prognostic profiles in acute myocardial infarction (1989)

Academic work
- Discipline: Internal Medicine
- Sub-discipline: Pulmonary and Critical Care Medicine
- Institutions: Baragwanath Hospital, Johannesburg; Department of Internal Medicine, Wayne State University; Department of Medicine, University of Massachusetts; Department of Medicine University of Massachusetts, Washington Hospital Center; Department of Critical Care, University of Pittsburgh Medical School; Division of Pulmonary and Critical Care Medicine, Thomas Jefferson University
- Main interests: Sepsis, tissue oxygenation

Paul Ellis Marik (born March 26, 1958) is an American physician and former professor of medicine. Until his resignation in January 2022, he served as chair of the Division of Pulmonary and Critical Care Medicine at Eastern Virginia Medical School in Norfolk, Virginia, and was also a critical care doctor at Sentara Norfolk General Hospital. His research interests include sepsis and tissue oxygenation. In August 2023 the American Board of Internal Medicine informed Marik his certification was to be revoked for spreading misinformation. The revocation followed in August 2024.

Marik developed the "Marik protocol" (also called the "HAT" protocol), a now discredited treatment for preventing sepsis. He is a co-leader of the Front Line COVID-19 Critical Care Alliance (FLCCC), which has misleadingly advocated for the anti-parasitic drug ivermectin to treat COVID-19 against the advice of leading health agencies. Marik has called himself a "status quo destabilizer".

== Early life and education ==
Marik was born in Johannesburg, South Africa. He earned a Master of Medicine in the Specialty of Internal Medicine in 1987 at the University of the Witwatersrand in Johannesburg.

Marik was an ICU attending at Baragwanath Hospital, in Soweto, South Africa.

== Career ==
Marik did a critical care fellowship in London, Ontario, Canada, and has subsequently worked in the United States in teaching hospitals since 1992.

In 2001, Marik was author of the Handbook of Evidence Based Critical Care. Reviewing its second edition for the journal Anaesthesia and Intensive Care, K. M. Ho wrote in 2011 that the book was "useful for junior doctors or intensive care trainees" but had "some limitations" such as "obvious drug dosage error" and "omissions of hypotensive effects". Another review, by Peter J. Papadakos in 2003 for the journal Respiratory Care, called it "an excellent introduction to the concept of evidence-based medicine".

From 2002 to 2006, Marik was part of the Editorial Board of Chest journal.

In 2005, Marik was named Director at the Division Pulmonary and Critical Care at Jefferson Medical College (JMC) and Thomas Jefferson University Hospital in Philadelphia.

In 2009, Marik became a professor and Chief of Pulmonary and Critical Care Medicine at Eastern Virginia Medical School.

In 2011, an international committee assembled by the main thoracic and respiratory national societies published guidelines for the diagnosis and management of idiopathic pulmonary fibrosis. The guidelines' section on the treatment of complications relied in part on the results of Marik's 2001 research on the association of gastric reflux and aspiration.

In 2012, an international committee updated guidelines for the management of severe sepsis and septic shock. In its section of supportive therapy recommendations, the committee based its concept on blood product administrations partly on research performed by Marik and W. Sibbald in 1993.

In 2017, Marik won the American College of Physicians award for outstanding educator of residents and fellows. He has written over 450 peer-reviewed journal articles.

In March 2021, Marik was reprimanded by the Virginia Board of Medicine and ordered to complete additional education in prescribing practices after it was found he had prescribed drugs, including phenobarbital, oxycodone, tramadol, alprazolam, and diazepam, to people who were not his patients. In November 2021, he sued his employer, Sentara Health, over its ban on prescribing ivermectin for COVID-19. His clinical privileges at Sentara Norfolk General Hospital were suspended shortly afterward. He resigned from Eastern Virginia Medical School effective December 31, 2021.

=== Advocacy for IV vitamin treatments ===
Marik is inventor of the "Marik protocol", also known as the "HAT" protocol, which proposes intravenous administration of hydrocortisone, ascorbic acid (vitamin C), and thiamine (vitamin B_{1}) as a treatment for preventing sepsis for people in intensive care. Marik's own initial research, published with four other authors in Chest in 2017, showed a dramatic evidence of benefit. The single-center, observational study compared outcomes of 47 consecutive sepsis patients who were treated with HAT during a 7-month period to 47 consecutive control patients during the preceding 7-month period. The study reported 19 deaths in the control group and 4 deaths in the treatment group.

Marik's findings received attention on social media and National Public Radio, but drew criticism from the wider medical community for being science by press conference. ER doctor Jeremy Faust was one of a number of skeptics of the results, noting the low reliability of the study design and potential for bias. The controversy prompted other groups to conduct studies of the HAT protocol. A systematic review of six randomized and five non-randomized controlled trials in 2021 found that the claimed benefits of the protocol could not be confirmed.

In August 2023, Marik was informed by the American Board of Internal Medicine (ABIM) that his board certification was to be revoked for "spreading false or inaccurate medical information". ABIM revoked his board certification in August 2024.

=== COVID-19 ===
Marik is a co-founder of the Front Line COVID-19 Critical Care Alliance (FLCCC), a group of physicians and former journalists formed in April 2020 that advocates for ineffective COVID-19 treatments, including hydroxychloroquine, the anti-parasitic drug ivermectin, and intravenous vitamin C.

Marik was lead author of a journal article on the efficacy of ivermectin as a COVID-19 treatment, which had been provisionally accepted for publication by a Frontiers Media journal in early 2021, but which was subsequently rejected on account of what the publisher said were "a series of strong, unsupported claims based on studies with insufficient statistical significance" meaning that the article did "not offer an objective [or] balanced scientific contribution to the evaluation of ivermectin as a potential treatment for COVID-19".

In November 2021, the Journal of Intensive Care Medicine retracted a paper written by Marik and others associated with the FLCCC, including Pierre Kory. The paper promoted a combination of vitamins and drugs as treatment for patients hospitalized for COVID-19. The combination was called MATH+ by the FLCCC and included methylprednisolone, ascorbic acid, thiamine, heparin, and other ingredients. The retraction was triggered when it was found the paper misreported the mortality figures of hospitalized patients treated with MATH+, falsely making it appear to be an effective treatment.

By April 2022, Marik had become associated with a right-wing political group called Defeat the Mandates. Appearing at a rally in Maryland, Marik began promoting further COVID-19 misinformation, saying without evidence that vaccines, masks and social distancing "didn't work" and that information about "early treatment" had been suppressed – "They don't want you to know this because they want you to be scared".

In March 2024, Marik and Pierre Kory published an op-ed in The Hill claiming that long COVID was caused by COVID-19 vaccination instead of COVID-19 infection. The op-ed was republished by the German disinformation outlet Disclose.tv. The fact-checking website Health Feedback found that the op-ed relied on anecdotes that did not provide evidence to support the claim. Later in 2024, Marik, Kory, and others revived a lawsuit against the FDA when it criticized through its social media, the use of ivermectin for COVID-19 (note above, that ivermectin has shown to be not effective for COVID-19). While the FDA settled this lawsuit, it also stated that its position was unchanged, that ivermectin was ineffective for COVID-19. Those same physicians then were characterized by journalist Karam Bales as: "The doctors in the FDA lawsuit didn't "win" much of substance or pragmatic value with this settlement. What they did do was to show that with enough money and legal persistence they can get a federal agency to delete messaging they don't like, setting a worrisome precedent".

== Selected publications ==
Marik, Paul E. (2012). "Pneumonia, Aspiration". In Vincent, Jean Louis., and Hall, Jesse B. eds. (2012). Encyclopedia of Intensive Care Medicine. Springer Berlin, Heidelberg. Encyclopedia of Intensive Care Medicine
