= John Campbell (YouTuber) =

English YouTuber

- Education: University of London (Nursing Diploma); Open University (BSc); University of Lancaster (MSc); University of Bolton (PhD)
- Children: 2

YouTube information
- Channel: Dr. John Campbell
- Years active: 2007–present
- Subscribers: 3.3 million
- Views: 862 million
- Last updated: 8 March 2026

John Lorimer Campbell is an English YouTuber and retired nurse educator who has made videos about the COVID-19 pandemic. Initially, the videos received praise, but they later diverged into COVID-19 misinformation. He has been criticised for suggesting COVID-19 deaths have been over-counted, repeating false claims about the use of ivermectin as a COVID-19 treatment, and providing misleading commentary about the safety of COVID-19 vaccines. As of March 2024, his YouTube channel had 3 million subscribers and over 750 million views.

== Early life and education ==
John Lorimer Campbell grew up primarily in the Stanwix district of Carlisle. He holds a diploma in nursing from the University of London, a BSc in biology from the Open University, an MSc in health science from the University of Lancaster, and a Ph.D. in nursing from the University of Bolton. He received the Ph.D. for his work on developing methods of teaching via digital media such as online videos.

== Career ==
Campbell worked as a nursing educator at the University of Cumbria, and has experience as an emergency department nurse. He has also tutored healthcare workers in Cambodia and India. He is the author of the nursing-related bioscience textbooks Campbell's Physiology Notes and Campbell's Pathophysiology Notes. A review in Emergency Nurse magazine said that the latter textbook contained "excellent [and] inexpensive notes on the causes, pathophysiological changes, and clinical features seen in disease processes". In 2008, he established a YouTube channel to provide educational lectures on topics in health science and nursing.

== COVID-19 pandemic ==
In early 2020 Campbell's YouTube channel started to focus on the developing COVID-19 pandemic. Until then, his videos had been receiving an average of several thousand views each, but his channel began to receive significant traffic after it started running COVID-related videos. Between February and March 2020, his channel increased from an average of 500,000 views per month to 9.6 million, mostly from American viewers. By September 2020, his videos had been viewed more than 50 million times. In March 2020, he argued that China's COVID-19 statistics were grossly underestimated and that the US and UK were doing too little to contain COVID-19. In September 2020, he argued that more ventilation in pubs, restaurants, and cafes would be needed in addition to the existing restrictions.

Early in the pandemic, Campbell spoke of the importance of a "calm and measured approach that is as informed as possible". He said he wanted to assist people in making informed decisions about their health in order to counter what he saw as other people on social media "spreading absolutely bonkers—and sometimes dangerous—information". In August 2020, UNICEF's regional office for Europe and Central Asia cited his YouTube channel as an excellent example of how experts might engage with social media to combat misinformation, citing a March 2020 briefing by Social Science in Humanitarian Action.

On the BBC's statistical programme More or Less, editor Richard Vadon said that Campbell – who was neither a scientist nor a medical doctor – had been on "quite a journey" since the beginning of the COVID-19 pandemic transitioning from "wholesome" videos on topics such as hand-washing, to what could be regarded as more fringe topics, garnering a large audience in the process.

In August 2022 David Gorski wrote for Science-Based Medicine that while at the beginning of the pandemic Campbell had "seemed semi-reasonable", he later became a "total COVID-19 crank", arguing that by October 2022 Campbell had become a source of misinformation and he had adopted an anti-vaccination stance. Others have expressed concern that Campbell's videos have been used by podcaster Jimmy Dore and others to support false claims against the COVID-19 vaccines.

=== Needle aspiration ===
In September 2021, Campbell said in a video that he believed that most people in the United Kingdom and United States were "giving the vaccines wrongly". Referencing a study on mice, he said that myocarditis could be caused if the person injecting the vaccine does not perform aspiration (checking that the needle does not hit a blood vessel by initially drawing back the plunger). Aspiration is a common technique but is not without disadvantages, so it has not been recommended by many countries.

=== Ivermectin ===
In November 2021, Campbell said in a video that ivermectin—an antiparasitic drug—may have contributed to a sudden decline in COVID-19 cases in Japan. However, the drug had never been officially authorised for such use in the country; its use was merely promoted by the chair of a non-governmental medical association in Tokyo and it has no established benefit as a COVID-19 treatment. Meaghan Kall, the lead COVID-19 epidemiologist at the British Health Security Agency, said that Campbell was confusing causation and correlation and that there was no evidence of ivermectin being used in large numbers in Japan, rather that his claims appeared to be "based on anecdata on social media driving wildly damaging misinformation".

In March 2022, Campbell posted another ivermectin video, in which he misrepresented a conference abstract to make the claim that it "unequivocally" showed ivermectin to be effective at reducing COVID-19 deaths, and that ivermectin was going to be the focus of a "huge scandal" because information about it had been suppressed. The authors of the abstract refuted such misrepresentations of their paper, with one writing on Twitter, "People like John Campbell are calling this a 'great thought out study' when in reality it's an abstract with preliminary data. We have randomized controlled trials, why are we still interested in retrospective cohort data abstracts?"

=== Vaccines ===
In November 2021, Campbell quoted from a non-peer-reviewed standalone journal abstract by Steven Gundry saying that mRNA vaccines might increase the risk of heart attack, and said that this might be "incredibly significant". This video was viewed over 2 million times within a few weeks and was used by anti-vaccination activists as support for the misinformation that COVID-19 vaccination causes heart attacks. According to a FactCheck.org review, although Campbell had drawn attention to the abstract's typos and its lack of methodology and data, he did not mention the expression of concern that had been issued against it.

In March 2022, Campbell posted a misleading video about the Pfizer COVID-19 vaccine, claiming that a Pfizer document admitted that the vaccine was associated with over 1,000 deaths. The video was viewed over 750,000 times and shared widely on social media. In reality, the document explicitly discredited any connection between vaccinations and reported deaths.

In July 2022, Campbell gave an error-filled account of an article published in the New England Journal of Medicine and falsely claimed that it showed the risk to children from COVID-19 vaccination was much greater than the risk of getting seriously ill from COVID-19 itself. The video received over 700,000 views. The article actually showed that COVID-19 vaccination greatly reduced the risk of children getting seriously ill from COVID-19.

In October 2022, Campbell uploaded a YouTube video in which he said he was sharing a scandalous "revelation" that the Pfizer COVID-19 vaccine did not prevent viral transmission, something he claimed had been hitherto hidden from the public. In reality, Pfizer had openly published at the time of the vaccine's creation that its effectiveness at preventing transmission was unknown and, in May 2021 before he became antivax, Campbell himself had posted a video acknowledging that the vaccine's potential to prevent transmission was unknown.

In December 2022 Campbell posted a video in which he made selective use of statistics to make the misleading claim that COVID-19 vaccines were so harmful that they should be withdrawn. The paper he used was in reality only considering hospitalisations from COVID-19 in a short time window, and not the overall vaccine risk/benefit balance. David Spiegelhalter, chair of Cambridge University's Winton Centre for Risk and Evidence Communication, said that such use of the data seemed "entirely inappropriate".

In February 2023, nanomedicine specialist Susan Oliver published a YouTube video debunking false information Campbell has posted about vaccine brain injury. Within six hours Oliver's video was removed, apparently because of the content in clips included from Campbell's video, while Campbell's entire original remained online. Oliver speculated this may have been as a result of coordinated complaints made by Campbell's YouTube followers, or that YouTube favoured high-traffic, highly profitable accounts; a YouTube spokesman said the number of complaints received did not affect decisions to remove content.

In August 2023, Campbell misrepresented a warning from the CDC, claiming that the CDC had said vaccinated people were more at risk from a new COVID variant than unvaccinated ones. In reality, the CDC had merely said that vaccinated people and people previously infected with COVID were susceptible to the new variant, without making any comparison to the unvaccinated.

In early 2024 Campbell posted a number of videos in which he showed images of blood clots from cadavers, and falsely claimed the clots were anomalous and caused by vaccination. In reality, such clots are naturally occurring aggregations of fibrin, typical in dead bodies regardless of vaccination status.

=== Death count ===
A popular misconception throughout the pandemic has been that COVID-19 misinformation deaths have been dramatically over-reported. In January 2022, Campbell posted a video in which he cited figures from the British Office for National Statistics (ONS) and suggested that they showed deaths from COVID-19 were "much lower than mainstream media seems to have been intimating". He concentrated on a figure of 17,371 death certificates showing only COVID-19 as the cause of death. Within a few days, the video had been viewed over 1.5 million times. It was shared by Conservative Party politician David Davis, who called it "excellent" and said that it was "disentangling the statistics". The ONS responded by debunking the claims as spurious and wrong. An ONS spokesman said suggesting that the 17,000 figure "represents the real extent of deaths from the virus is both factually incorrect and highly misleading". The official figure for COVID-19-related deaths in the UK for the period was over 175,000 at the time; in 140,000 of those cases, the underlying cause of death was listed as COVID-19.

In October 2023, the BBC Radio 4 programme More or Less debunked a video that Campbell had made in September 2023 in which he wrongly claimed that excess deaths were higher among those who had had a COVID-19 vaccine than those who had not; the figures he used in fact showed the opposite. Campbell took down his video after being contacted by the programme, telling them that he was not a statistician.

=== Monkeypox parallels ===
In July 2022, Campbell posted a video in which he promoted the misleading idea that "parallels" could be drawn between the 2022 monkeypox outbreak and SARS-CoV-2 virus, because the pathogens were being studied in laboratories prior to an outbreak occurring. The misinformation was embraced and amplified by Jimmy Dore and his comedy co-host Kurt Metzger, achieving wide currency on social media.

== Personal life ==
Campbell lives in Carlisle. He has two children. He is a devout Christian and in December 2024 shared his faith and belief in Creationism in an interview with Russell Brand.

== Selected publications ==
- Campbell J (2006). Campbell's Physiology Notes For Nurses. Wiley. ISBN 978-0-470-03241-1.
- Campbell J (2006). Campbell's Pathophysiology Notes. Lorimer Publications. ISBN 978-0-955-37970-3.
