= Bret Weinstein =

American podcaster and author (born 1969)

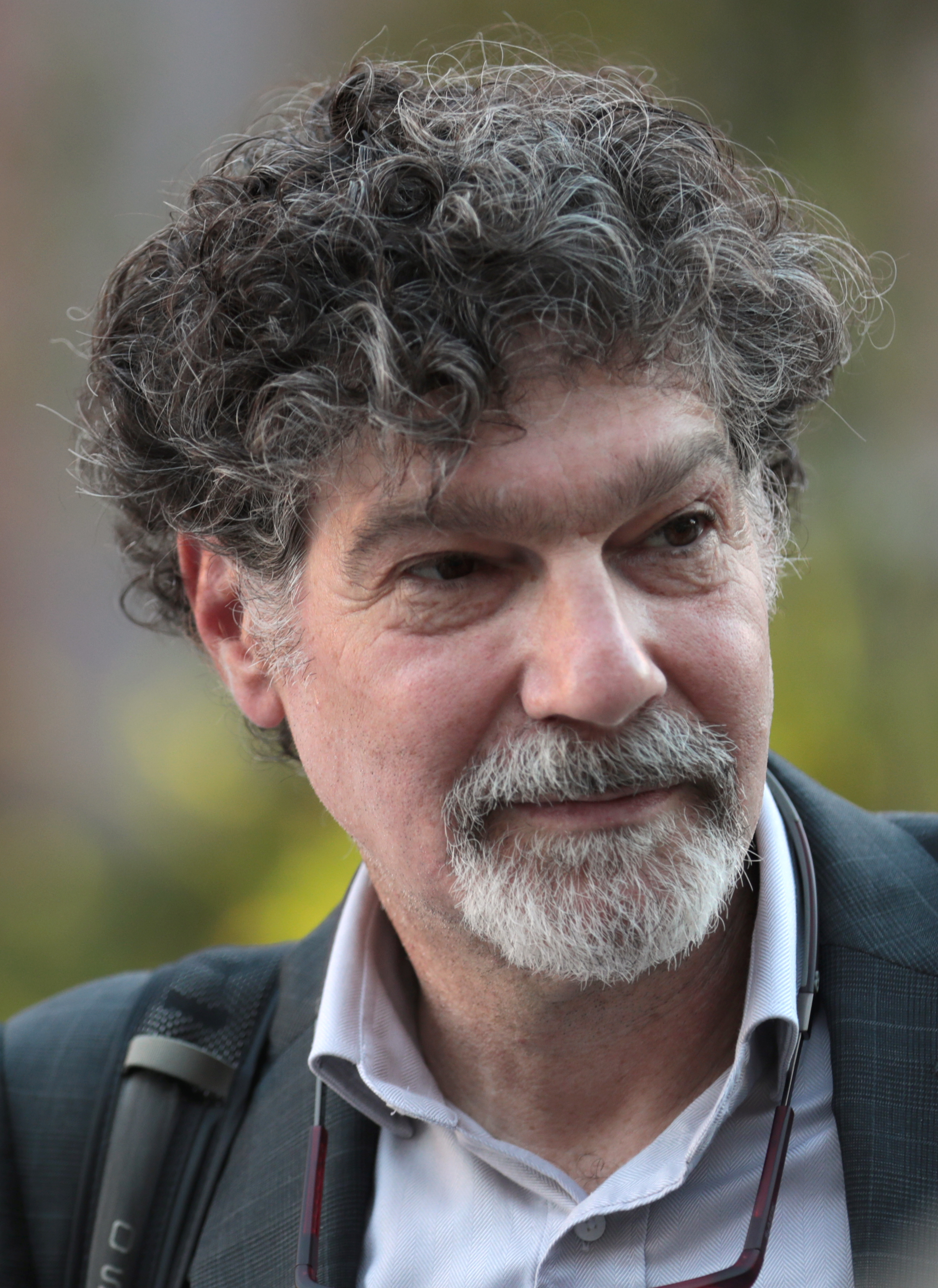
- Weinstein in 2022
- Born: Bret Samuel Weinstein; February 21, 1969 (age 57); Los Angeles, California, U.S.
- Education: University of Pennsylvania; University of California, Santa Cruz (BA); University of Michigan (MA, PhD)
- Occupations: Author, podcaster
- Spouse: Heather Heying
- Relatives: Eric Weinstein (brother)
- Scientific career
- Fields: Evolutionary biology
- Workplaces: Evergreen State College
- Thesis: Evolutionary Trade-Offs: Emergent Constraints and Their Adaptive Consequences (2009)
- Doctoral advisor: Richard D. Alexander
- Website: bretweinstein.net

Bret Samuel Weinstein (/ˈwaɪnstaɪn/; born February 21, 1969) is an American podcaster, author, and former professor of evolutionary biology. He served on the faculty of Evergreen State College from 2002 until 2017, when he resigned in the aftermath of a series of campus protests about racial equity at Evergreen, which brought Weinstein to national attention. Like his brother Eric Weinstein, he was named as a member of the intellectual dark web in a 2018 New York Times essay by columnist Bari Weiss. Weinstein has been a prominent purveyor of false statements about COVID-19 treatments and vaccines and misinformation about HIV/AIDS.

== Early life and education ==
Weinstein was born on February 21, 1969, in Los Angeles, California. He began his undergraduate studies at the University of Pennsylvania. As a freshman, Weinstein wrote a letter to the school newspaper that condemned sexual harassment of strippers at a Zeta Beta Tau fraternity party. After experiencing harassment for the letter, he transferred to the University of California, Santa Cruz, where he met his wife, Heather Heying, and completed an undergraduate degree in biology in 1993. Weinstein went on to earn a PhD in evolutionary biology from the University of Michigan in 2009.

== Career ==
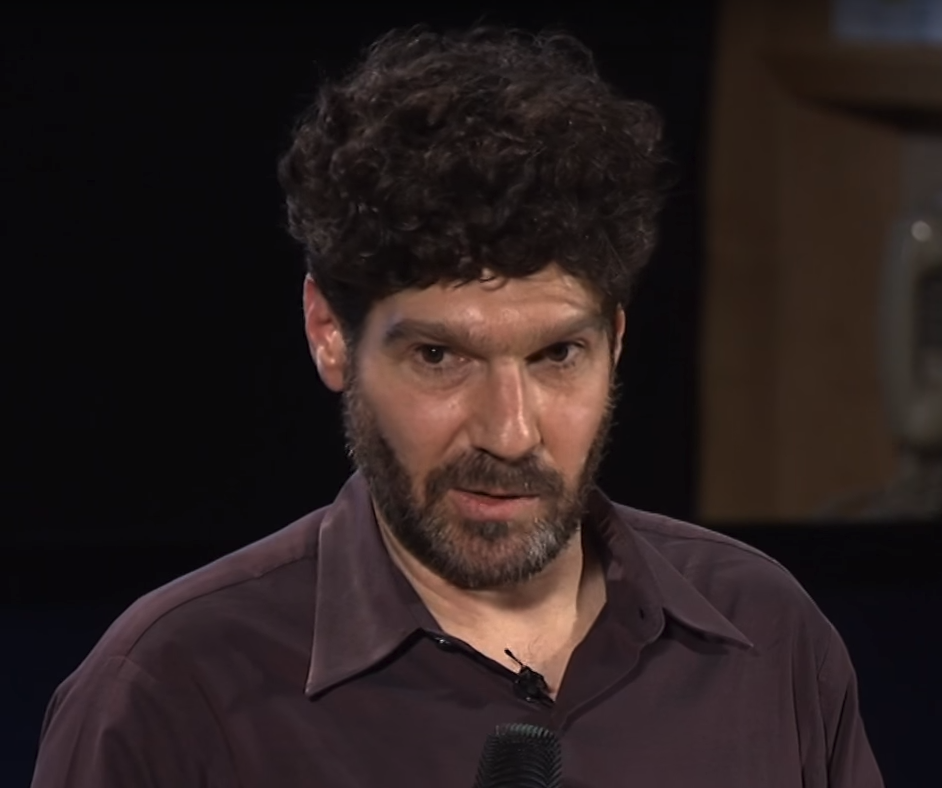
Weinstein holding a TEDx talk at Evergreen State College in 2012

=== Evergreen State College ===
Until 2017, Weinstein was a professor of biology at Evergreen State College in Washington State. In 2002, he coauthored an article on "The Reserve-Capacity Hypothesis", which proposed that the telomeric differences between humans and laboratory mice have led scientists to underestimate the risks that new drugs pose to humans in the form of heart disease, liver dysfunction, and related organ failure.

==== "Day of Absence" ====
In March 2017, Weinstein wrote a letter to Evergreen faculty in which he objected to a suggestion pertaining to the college's decades-old tradition of observing a "Day of Absence", during which ethnic minority students and faculty would voluntarily stay away from campus to highlight their contributions to the college. An administrator had suggested that for that year white participants stay off campus, and were invited to attend an off-campus program on race issues. Weinstein wrote that the change established a dangerous precedent:

There is a huge difference between a group or coalition deciding to voluntarily absent themselves from a shared space to highlight their vital and underappreciated roles ... and a group encouraging another group to go away. The first is a forceful call to consciousness, which is, of course, crippling to the logic of oppression. The second is a show of force, and an act of oppression in and of itself.

— Bret Weinstein, in a message to event organizer, Rashida Love

The event organizers responded that participation was voluntary and that the event did not imply that all white people should leave. The Washington Post reported that racial tensions had been simmering at Evergreen throughout 2017.

In May 2017, student protests disrupted the campus and called for a number of changes to the college. The protests involved allegations of racism, intolerance and threats; brought national attention to Evergreen; and sparked further debate about freedom of speech on college campuses. During the protests, protesters entered one of Weinstein's classes (which he had held in a public park) and confronted him, loudly accusing him of racism, demanding that he resign, and forcing the class to break up. Weinstein was advised by the Chief of Campus Police to temporarily stay away from campus for his safety.

Weinstein and his wife, Heather Heying, brought a lawsuit against the school, alleging that the college's president had not asked campus police to quell student protesters. Weinstein also said that campus police had told him that they could not protect him, and that they had encouraged him to stay off campus. Instead, Weinstein held his biology class that day in a public park. A settlement was reached in September 2017 in which Weinstein and Heying resigned and received $250,000 each, after having sought $3.8 million in damages.

=== Post-Evergreen activities ===
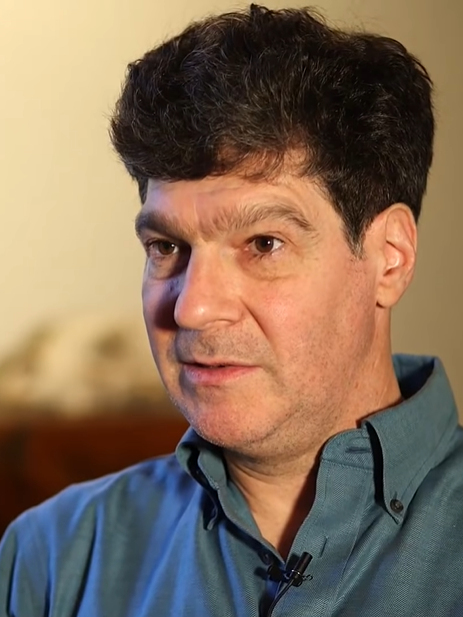
Weinstein in 2018

Following his resignation from Evergreen State College, Weinstein appeared on the podcasts of Sam Harris and Joe Rogan, and moderated two debates between Harris and Jordan Peterson. Weinstein appeared before the U.S. House Oversight Committee in 2018 to discuss freedom of speech on college campuses and appeared in the 2019 documentary No Safe Spaces, which documents the Evergreen incidents. He was named in a 2018 New York Times essay by columnist Bari Weiss as a prominent member of the "intellectual dark web". The term was coined by Weinstein's brother Eric, and came to refer to a loose network of public figures opposed to left-wing identity politics and political correctness.

In June 2019, Weinstein began the DarkHorse Podcast on his YouTube channel, which is usually co-hosted with his wife Heather. Their first guest was Andy Ngo. Other guests have included Harris, Glenn Loury, Douglas Murray, John Wood Jr., Thomas Chatterton Williams and Coleman Hughes. Topics for the podcast often center on current events, science, and culture.

Weinstein was a 2019–2020 James Madison Program Visiting Fellow at Princeton University, which continued for the 2020–2021 year. In 2021, Weinstein and Heying's book, A Hunter-Gatherer's Guide to the 21st Century, was published. The book reached the New York Times Best Seller list for October 3, 2021, at No. 3 for Combined Print & E-Book Nonfiction and No. 4 for Hardcover Nonfiction. The hardcover listing was marked with a dagger, indicating that some retailers had reported receiving bulk orders. In a review for The Guardian, psychologist Stuart J. Ritchie writes that Weinstein and Heying "lazily repeat false information from other pop-science books", and that overall the book was characterized by an annoying, know-it-all attitude.

== Health misinformation ==
=== COVID-19 ===
During the COVID-19 pandemic, Weinstein made several public appearances advocating the use of the antiparasitic drug ivermectin to prevent or treat the disease and downplaying the effectiveness of COVID-19 vaccines. A review in the academic journal AIDS and Behavior says Weinstein has been "instrumental in spreading COVID misinformation". Physician David Gorski, editor of Science-Based Medicine, describes Weinstein as a prominent "COVID-19 contrarian" and "one of the foremost purveyors of COVID-19 disinformation", citing his appearances on The Joe Rogan Experience and Real Time with Bill Maher. An article in Canadian Family Physician characterizes Weinstein as one of the "intelligent misinformers", whose academic and presentational skills gives their medical misinformation a "superficial air of credibility".

Weinstein has made erroneous claims that ivermectin can prevent or treat COVID-19, calling it "a near-perfect COVID prophylactic". There is no good evidence to support such claims. Weinstein has hosted ivermectin advocate Pierre Kory on his DarkHorse podcast to discuss the drug, and has advocated for the use of ivermectin on other podcast and television news appearances. Weinstein took ivermectin during a livestream video and said both he and his wife had not been vaccinated because of their fears concerning COVID-19 vaccines. On Rogan's podcast, Weinstein said that ivermectin alone is "good enough to end the pandemic at any point" and claimed that the drug's true effectiveness against COVID-19 was being suppressed in order to push vaccines for the financial benefit of Big Pharma. After Weinstein's and Heying's YouTube channels were demonetized in response to their claims about ivermectin, they moved their subsequent broadcasts to the fringe alternative video sharing platform Odysee. On an episode of Tucker Carlson Today, Weinstein said that if ivermectin functioned as he thought it did, then "the debate about the vaccines would be over by definition." Weinstein later said he was wrong to state that a study had shown a 100% effective ivermectin protocol for the prevention of COVID.

Weinstein told Haaretz that despite not having been vaccinated against COVID-19 himself, he supports vaccines in general and believes that mRNA vaccines have promise despite what he claims are "some clear design flaws". Weinstein has falsely claimed that the spike protein produced by or contained within COVID-19 vaccines is "very dangerous" and "cytotoxic". Eric Topol, vice-president of the Scripps Research Institute, stated that Weinstein's position on mRNA vaccines is "totally irresponsible. It's reckless. It's sick. It's predatory. It's really sad."

In a 2024 clip of the Tucker Carlson Network podcast that was widely shared on Instagram, Weinstein asserted that the World Health Organization's (WHO) proposed pandemic treaty to help member nations prevent and prepare for future infectious disease outbreaks could be used to strip U.S. citizens of their First Amendment rights to freedom of speech. He also later claimed that the WHO treaty would eliminate "national and personal sovereignty". However, the treaty would have no ability to override U.S. law or alter the U.S. Constitution, which is the supreme law of the land in the United States.

=== HIV/AIDS ===
Weinstein is one of several social media influencers whose COVID contrarianism is accompanied by promotion of HIV/AIDS denialism. Appearing on an episode of the Joe Rogan Experience podcast in February 2024, Weinstein erroneously stated that some people with AIDS were not infected with human immunodeficiency virus (HIV). Weinstein agreed with Rogan's false claim that party drugs such as poppers are an "important factor" for AIDS, calling the idea that HIV does not cause AIDS "surprisingly compelling". The American Foundation for AIDS Research reacted to the podcast, saying "It is disappointing to see platforms being used to spout old, baseless theories about HIV. ... The fact is that the human immunodeficiency virus (HIV), untreated, causes AIDS. ... Mr. Rogan and Mr. Weinstein do their listeners a disservice in disseminating false information".

== Political views ==
Between 2017 and 2021, Weinstein variously described himself as liberal, progressive, and left-libertarian. In 2020, he announced Unity 2020, a plan to nominate for the 2020 United States presidential election a pair of suitable candidates, each associated with one of both major political parties, to govern as a team. In early 2024, he favored Robert F. Kennedy Jr. for the 2024 United States presidential election. After Kennedy's withdrawal from the race, Weinstein campaigned for Donald Trump.

== Personal life ==
Weinstein has lived in Portland, Oregon, since 2018. He is married to Heather Heying, an evolutionary biologist who also worked at Evergreen. Heying resigned from the college along with Weinstein during the Day of Absence controversy.

== Selected publications ==
- Heying, Heather; Weinstein, Bret (2021). A Hunter-Gatherer's Guide to the 21st Century: Evolution and the Challenges of Modern Life. New York: Portfolio. ISBN 978-0-593-08688-9.
- Weinstein, Bret S. (January 2009). "Evolutionary Trade-Offs: Emergent Constraints and Their Adaptive Consequences" (PDF). University of Michigan.
- Lahti, David C.; Weinstein, Bret S. (January 2005). "The better angels of our nature: Group stability and the evolution of moral tension". Evolution & Human Behavior. 26 (1): 47–63. Bibcode:2005EHumB..26...47L. doi:10.1016/j.evolhumbehav.2004.09.004.
- Weinstein, Bret S.; Ciszek, Deborah (2002). "The reserve-capacity hypothesis: Evolutionary origins and modern implications of the trade-off between tumor-suppression and tissue-repair". Experimental Gerontology. 37 (5): 615–627. doi:10.1016/S0531-5565(02)00012-8. PMID 11909679. S2CID 12912742.
