= Intellectual dark web =

Commentators opposed to identity politics and political correctness

The intellectual dark web (IDW) is a loose grouping of academics and social commentators who oppose what they perceive as the influence of left-wing identity politics and political correctness in higher education and mass media. Individuals and publications associated with the term may reject what they view as authoritarianism and ostracism within academia, the (mainstream) science community, and progressive movements in Western countries. The stance may include opposition to deplatforming, boycotts, and online shaming, when perceived as threats to freedom of speech.

== Origin and usage ==
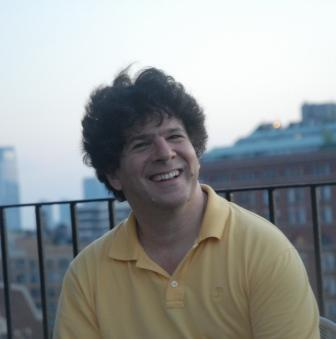
Eric Weinstein in 2010

The term "intellectual dark web" was coined as a joke by mathematician and venture capitalist Eric Weinstein and popularized by New York Times opinion editor Bari Weiss. It has been used to refer to various academics and social commentators who express concerns over the perceived excesses of left-wing identity politics and political correctness. Media studies scholar John Postill argues that Weiss's essay, titled "Meet the Renegades", was a "defining media event" that offered an identity and cast of characters for the "anti-woke" movement to follow.

The first recorded usage of the term was on a 2017 episode of Sam Harris's podcast, when Weinstein used it to refer to a group of thinkers, including Weinstein and Harris, who used digital media to offer alternatives to mainstream media narratives.

Derek Beres argues for Big Think that other controversies, dating back to 2014, should also be viewed as antecedents to the IDW. These include a debate between Harris and Ben Affleck on Real Time with Bill Maher in October 2014, the publication of "Google's Ideological Echo Chamber" by James Damore in August 2017, and Cathy Newman's interview of Jordan Peterson on Channel 4 News in January 2018, each of which related to controversial topics such as Islamic extremism and workplace diversity policies.

== Membership and ideology ==
The IDW comprises an ideologically diverse network of commentators who share an opposition to left-wing identity politics and political correctness. They often claim to have been unfairly treated by mainstream media and higher education institutions, which they say have been pressured into avoiding controversial topics. Other issues of concern include postmodernism and "cultural Marxism", which are perceived as contributing to moral relativism and the suppression of free speech.

In her essay, Weiss characterized IDW members as "iconoclastic" and "academic renegades" who had found audiences online after being "purged" from institutions that had become "hostile to unorthodox thought". Eric Weinstein described the IDW as being opposed to "the gated institutional narrative" of the mainstream media and political elites. IDW figures often use alternative media, including podcasts and newsletters, to build identification with audiences who are disillusioned with mainstream media and politics by branding themselves as reasonable thinkers and reinforcing narratives of political polarization. According to Weiss, many IDW members have identified as atheist, including "New Atheists" Ayaan Hirsi Ali, Sam Harris, and Steven Pinker. Commentators such as Douglas Murray, Maajid Nawaz, Joe Rogan, and Dave Rubin are also included. Other notable IDW members according to Weiss include Weinstein and his brother, biologist Bret Weinstein, Bret Weinstein's wife Heather Heying, and commentators Jordan Peterson, Ben Shapiro, and Christina Hoff Sommers.

IDW beliefs overlap with those of the alt-right movement while tending to avoid explicit white supremacy and ethnonationalism. Similarities with the alt-right are seen in debates over gender identity, feminism, men's rights, and race science. IDW commentators tend to dismiss issues of transgender rights and racial and gender inequality as the concerns of leftist "social justice warriors" while welcoming some gay men, such as Murray and Rubin, into their ranks. Jacob Hamburger argues in the Los Angeles Review of Books that the IDW belongs to a neoconservative tradition of attacks on "political correctness" that began during the Reagan era, associated with commentators such as Allan Bloom, Roger Kimball, Dinesh D’Souza, David Brooks, Irving Kristol, and Norman Podhoretz. Hamburger describes leftists along with liberals and progressives as the "primary adversaries" of the IDW.

A 2019 study from the Federal University of Minas Gerais described the IDW as a gateway to far-right ideology. Analyzing comments on over 331,000 YouTube videos, the study found that viewers tended to migrate from commenting on clips associated with the IDW and the "alt-lite" to commenting on more "right-wing and/or alt-right" videos. The study looked at videos that an algorithm had classified as right-wing, analyzed 79 million YouTube comments, and found a group that migrated from IDW channels to "alt-lite" channels, and then to alt-right channels. The subjects who left comments at an IDW channel were more likely to graduate, after a few years, to leaving significantly more comments on alt-right channels than the control group. The study's authors said they were not intending to "point fingers", but to draw attention to the effects of YouTube's recommendation algorithm.

Some IDW members describe themselves as liberals in opposition to what they perceive as the excesses and indifference of the American Left, while others lean to the right. Those who have been linked to the IDW are generally critical of what they perceive as "conformist" liberals, and some have been associated with the alt-lite and the alt-right. Political scientist Daniel W. Drezner argues that the IDW contributes to polarization because of its need to appeal to a primarily right-wing audience, despite the political leanings of individual members. The Guardian characterizes the IDW as an ill-defined movement composed of figures from both "the right and sometimes left extremes of the political spectrum" who share a belief in "hardcore libertarianism". This includes "mainstream intellectuals" such as Steven Pinker alongside "cranks and show-offs" such as Milo Yiannopoulos and Alex Jones.

Nick Fouriezos of Ozy magazine describes IDW as "a growing school of thought that includes a collection of mostly left-leaning professors, pundits and thinkers united in their criticism of the modern social justice movement as authoritarian and illogical." Liberals who have been labelled as being part of the IDW often credit the European Enlightenment with vast improvements in human welfare, and see Enlightenment values such as freedom of speech and individual rights as being threatened by both "Social Justice Warriors" on the left, and Trumpism and Christian nationalism on the right.

== Reception ==
Criticism of the IDW has come primarily from the left and support from the right. Jonah Goldberg, writing in the National Review, said the "label is a bit overwrought", writing that it struck him "as a marketing label – and not necessarily a good one. ... It seems to me this IDW thing isn't actually an intellectual movement. It's just a coalition of thinkers and journalists who happen to share a disdain for the keepers of the liberal orthodoxy." Henry Farrell, writing in Vox, expressed disbelief that conservative commentator Ben Shapiro or neuroscientist Sam Harris, both claimed to be among the intellectual dark web by Weiss, could credibly be described as either purged or silenced. Weiss' fellow New York Times columnist Paul Krugman argued there was an irony in claiming popular intellectual oppression by the mainstream while still publishing in the Times, among the most prominent newspapers in the nation. David French contended many of the critics were missing the point, and were instead inadvertently confirming "the need for a movement of intellectual free-thinkers."

== See also ==
- Bill Maher – American comedian and television host (born 1956)
- Culture war – Conflict between cultural values
- Claire Lehmann – Australian writer (born 1985)
- Dark web – World Wide Web content existing on darknets
- Debra Soh – Canadian sex researcher
- Heterodox Academy – American advocacy group
