= Social Science Research Network =

Repository for preprints

SSRN
- Producer: Elsevier
- History: 1994–present
- Languages: English

Access
- Cost: Mostly fee-free (monetarily gratis)

Coverage
- Disciplines: Social sciences, engineering sciences, humanities, life sciences, applied sciences, health sciences, and physical sciences
- Record depth: Index, abstract, and full-text
- Format coverage: Papers

Links
- Website: ssrn.com

SSRN, abbreviated from Social Science Research Network, is an open access research platform that functions as a repository for sharing early-stage research and preprints. It facilitates the rapid dissemination of scholarly research in the social sciences, humanities, life sciences, and health sciences, among others. It was formerly called Social Science Research Network, now called SSRN to reflect that it hosts content not only in social sciences but also in a wide range of disciplines including economics, law, business and engineering. Elsevier bought SSRN from Social Science Electronic Publishing Inc. in May 2016. It is not an electronic journal, but rather an electronic library and search engine.

== History ==
SSRN was founded in 1994 by Michael C. Jensen and Wayne Marr, both financial economists.

In January 2013, SSRN was ranked the largest open-access repository in the world by Ranking Web of Repositories (an initiative of the Cybermetrics Lab, a research group belonging to the Spanish National Research Council), measured by number of PDF files, backlinks and Google Scholar results.

In May 2016, SSRN was bought from Social Science Electronic Publishing Inc. by Elsevier. On 17 May 2016, the SSRN founder and chairman Michael C. Jensen wrote a letter to the SSRN community in which he cited SSRN CEO Gregg Gordon's post on the Elsevier Connect and the "new opportunities" coming from the fusion, such as a broader global network and the freedom "to upload and download papers" (with more data, more resources, as well as new management tools). While predicting "some conflicts" between the interests of the two parties, he expected them to be "surmountable".

In July 2016 there were reports of papers being removed from SSRN without notice; revision comments from SSRN indicated this was due to copyright concerns. Gordon characterized the issue as a mistake affecting about 20 papers.

== Operations ==
Academic papers in Portable Document Format can be uploaded directly to the SSRN site by authors and are then available around the world for download. Users can also subscribe to abstracting emails covering a broad range of research areas and topic specialties. These distributing emails contain abstracts (with links to the full text where applicable) of papers recently submitted to SSRN in the respective field.

SSRN, like other preprint services, circulates publications throughout the scholarly community at an early stage, permitting the author to incorporate comments into the final version of the paper before its publication in a journal. Moreover, even if access to the published paper is restricted, access to the original working paper remains open through SSRN, so long as the author decides to keep the paper up. Often authors take papers down at the request of publishers, particularly if they are published by commercial or university presses that depend on payment for paper copies or online access.

As of 2019, download by users is generally subject to registration and/or completion of a ReCAPTCHA challenge and therefore SSRN is not considered by some to be a suitable open access location, unlike open archives like most institutional repositories. Publishers and institutions can upload papers and charge a fee for readers to download them.

On SSRN, authors and papers are ranked by their number of downloads, which has become an informal indicator of popularity on prepress and open access sites.

== See also ==
- List of academic databases and search engines
- List of preprint repositories
- ArXiv
- Research Papers in Economics
- SocArXiv
