= Eric Weinstein =

American investor and podcaster (born 1965)

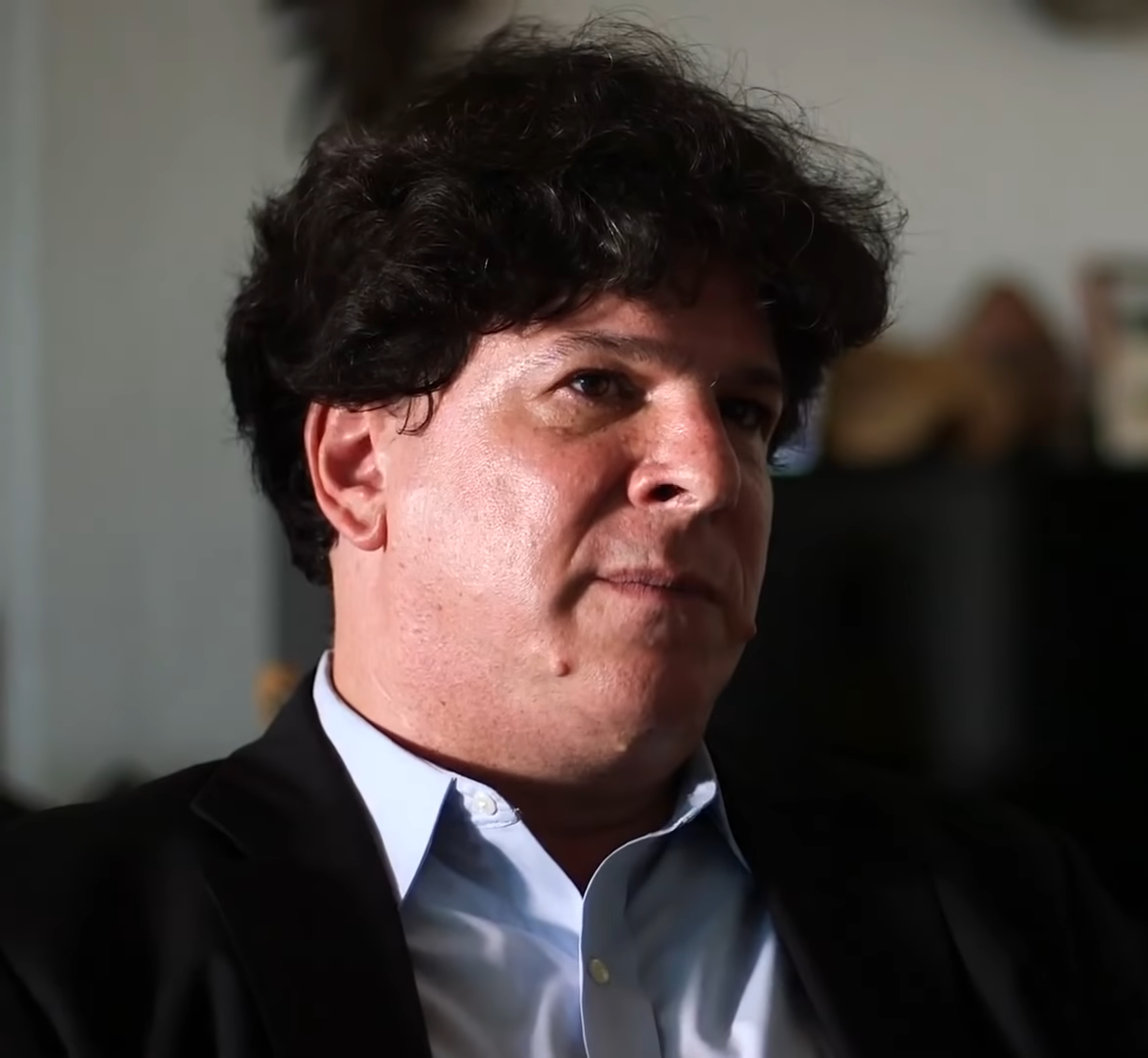
- Weinstein in 2019
- Born: Eric Ross Weinstein; October 26, 1965 (age 61)
- Education: University of Pennsylvania (BA, MA); Harvard University (PhD)
- Occupations: Venture capital fund manager, podcast host
- Known for: Intellectual dark web
- Spouse: Pia Malaney
- Relatives: Bret Weinstein (brother)
- Website: ericweinstein.org

Eric Ross Weinstein (/ˈwaɪnstaɪn/; born October 26, 1965) is an American investor and podcast host. As of 2021, he was managing director for the American venture capital firm Thiel Capital. Weinstein coined the term "intellectual dark web" to refer to a loose network of public figures opposed to left-wing identity politics and political correctness in the late 2010s. He has proposed what he claims is a theory of everything called "Geometric Unity" that has largely been met with skepticism by the scientific community.

== Early life and education ==
Born on October 26, 1965, Weinstein studied mathematics at the University of Pennsylvania, where he completed his undergraduate degree in 1985. Weinstein received a Ph.D. in mathematics from Harvard University in 1992 under the supervision of Raoul Bott. In his dissertation, "Extension of Self-Dual Yang-Mills Equations Across the Eighth Dimension", Weinstein showed that the self-dual Yang–Mills equations were not peculiar to dimension four and admitted generalizations to higher dimensions.

== Career ==
=== Finance ===
In 2013, Weinstein was working as an economist and consultant at the Natron Group, a New York City–based hedge fund. As of 2021, Weinstein was the managing director for Thiel Capital, a venture capital firm founded by American financier Peter Thiel that invests in technology and life sciences–related companies.

=== Geometric Unity ===
In May 2013, mathematician Marcus du Sautoy invited Weinstein to give a lecture at Oxford University's Clarendon Laboratory on a theory called "Geometric Unity"; Sautoy also wrote an overview for The Guardian newspaper. Physicists David Kaplan and Jim al-Khalili as well as Joseph Conlon of Oxford expressed skepticism. Physicists criticized Weinstein and du Sautoy for not publishing any equations related to the theory, which is a normal part of scholarly peer review. Science writer Jennifer Ouellette criticized the favorable coverage given to the theory by The Guardian, arguing that experts could not properly evaluate Weinstein's ideas without a published paper.

In April 2021, Weinstein self-published a paper on Geometric Unity, which he described as a "work of entertainment". Cosmologist Richard Easther of the University of Auckland said Weinstein's theory has had "no visible impact" and "looked massively undercooked after the buildup it got from du Sautoy". Timothy Nguyen, whose PhD thesis intersects with Weinstein's work, said what Weinstein has presented so far has "gaps, both mathematical and physical in origin" that "jeopardize Geometric Unity as a well-defined theory, much less one that is a candidate for a theory of everything". Science writer Dan Kagan-Kans has described the resentment of scientific authority expounded by Weinstein and other contemporary podcasters as "conspiracy physics".

=== Other ventures ===
Weinstein has been a regular guest on The Joe Rogan Experience, appearing on the podcast eight times as of June 2026. He has also hosted his own podcast called The Portal. As of 2024, he is a member of the research team on The Galileo Project, founded by astrophysicist Avi Loeb to investigate potential signs of extraterrestrial technology. Weinstein coined the term "intellectual dark web", later popularized by Bari Weiss, then an opinion editor for The New York Times. The term has been applied to a loose network of public figures opposed to left-wing identity politics and political correctness.
