= Independent Medical Alliance =

U.S. organization of physicians and former journalists

- Formation: March 2020
- Presidents: Pierre Kory, Paul E. Marik
- Website: www.covid19criticalcare.com

The Independent Medical Alliance (formerly Front Line COVID-19 Critical Care Alliance [FLCCC]) is a group of physicians and former journalists, formed in April 2020, that has advocated for various unapproved, dubious, and ineffective treatments for COVID-19 (e.g. hydroxychloroquine, ivermectin, and other miscellaneous combinations of drugs and vitamins). The group was led from the start by Paul E. Marik and Pierre Kory. Initially their website said nothing against the vaccine, but promoted ivermectin until the vaccines were made available. Both would later join conservative or right-wing groups promoting COVID-19 vaccine hesitancy and misinformation. In August 2024 both men had their medical board certifications revoked. On January 16, 2025, the organization changed its name to the Independent Medical Alliance.

The World Health Organization, U.S. Food and Drug Administration, and European Medicines Agency advise against the use of ivermectin for COVID-19 outside of clinical trials, but the FLCCC has erroneously claimed that ivermectin could reduce viral load and accelerate recovery in people with COVID-19.

== History ==
The FLCCC was founded by eight physicians and two former journalists in April 2020, at the start of the COVID-19 pandemic in the U.S. According to its co-president, Paul E. Marik, the group has a shared interest in vitamin C.

The group initially started promoting Marik's discredited sepsis treatment protocol as a treatment for COVID-19, and in April 2020 it circulated press releases promoting vitamin C, heparin, hydroxychloroquine and other drugs, before pivoting to ivermectin promotion in October 2020.

In November 2021 the Journal of Intensive Care Medicine retracted a paper written by Pierre Kory, Marik, and others. The retraction was triggered when it was found the paper misreported the mortality figures of people treated for COVID-19 with the FLCCC's "MATH+" protocol, falsely making it appear to be an effective treatment.

In August 2023 both Kory and Marik were informed by the American Board of Internal Medicine that their board certifications were to be revoked for "spreading false or inaccurate medical information". In August 2024, both men's certifications were duly revoked.

=== Advocacy of ivermectin for COVID-19 ===
In January 2021, the FLCCC presented findings on the use of the anti-parasite drug ivermectin against COVID-19 to the National Institutes of Health, which ruled there was "insufficient data to recommend either for or against the use of ivermectin for the treatment of COVID-19" without clinical trials. A 2021 review article by FLCCC members on the efficacy of ivermectin, which was provisionally accepted by Frontiers in Pharmacology, was subsequently rejected on account of what the publisher called "a series of strong, unsupported claims based on studies with insufficient statistical significance" meaning that the article did "not offer an objective [or] balanced scientific contribution to the evaluation of ivermectin as a potential treatment for COVID-19". The FLCCC review article included a study from Egypt that was later retracted after anomalies were found in its data and concerns were raised about plagiarism.

=== Stance on vaccines ===
In 2021 the FLCCC said "vaccination is part of the solution", but COVID-19 vaccines were not listed in its preventative protocols, and in June 2022 a FAQ on the website, "What is your position on vaccines?", was removed. In August 2021 one doctor, Eric Osgood, resigned from the FLCCC because the group "may be contributing to people making the choice not to get vaccinated". Osgood commented: "If you're going to have a page that's dedicated to 'How do you prevent yourself from getting COVID?' that page can't not have vaccines at the top of it?"

Susanna Priest, editor-in-chief of Science Communication, has said the FLCCC's messaging is discouraging vaccination, thereby prolonging the pandemic.

Both co-founders of the group would later join conservative or right-wing groups promoting COVID-19 vaccine hesitancy and misinformation.

=== Ohio lawsuit ===
In 2021, Fred Wagshul, a member of the FLCCC, prescribed ivermectin for a patient in a hospital in Ohio where he did not have admitting privileges. The patient's wife secured a temporary injunction from a judge of the Butler County, Ohio Court of Common Pleas ordering the man's doctors to administer ivermectin; a different judge of the same court overrode the order, determining that the plaintiff had failed to meet the requirements for a temporary injunction and writing, "there can be no doubt that the medical and scientific communities do not support the use of ivermectin as a treatment for COVID-19".

=== Other unproven claims ===
In November 2022, Pierre Kory and the FLCCC began marketing a cocktail of supplements and drugs (e.g. ivermectin and nitazoxanide) for other viruses, influenza and Respiratory syncytial virus (RSV). Like the FLCCC-advocated COVID treatments, the recommendations lacked credible supporting scientific evidence. The Washington Post estimated that this cocktail could cost over $500.

== See also ==
- COVID-19 drug repurposing research (ivermectin)
- COVID-19 misinformation (ivermectin)
- Science by press release
- America's Frontline Doctors
- World Council for Health
