= Disclose.tv =

German disinformation outlet

- Homepage in April 2023
- Available in: English
- Founded: 2007
- Headquarters: Passau, Germany
- Owners: Futurebytes GmbH & Co. KG
- Website: disclose.tv

Disclose.tv is a disinformation outlet (Note: Sources describing Disclose.tv as a disinformation outlet:) based in Germany that presents itself as a news aggregator. It is known for promoting conspiracy theories (Note: Sources describing Disclose.tv's promotion of conspiracy theories:) and fake news, (Note: Sources describing Disclose.tv's promotion of fake news:) including COVID-19 misinformation and anti-vaccine narratives. (Note: Sources describing Disclose.tv's promotion of anti-vaccine narratives:)

The website was created in 2007 as a conspiracy forum focused around content such as UFOs and paranormal phenomena. In 2021, it rebranded itself as a news aggregator on its social media platforms and website. Disclose.tv pushes far-right content, conspiracy theories and misleading information together with real news taken from other sources frequently without attribution, and platforms hate speech, including Holocaust denial and neo-Nazism, on its message groups.

== History ==
Disclose.tv in November 2015

Archived versions of Disclose.tv were found as far back as March 2007 by Logically, a British anti-disinformation organisation. In its initial form, the website operated as a forum focusing on user-generated content discussing topics such as UFOs, paranormal phenomena and conspiracy theories. The website's name references the concept of "disclosure" in the UFO community, referring to the time they believe the government will confirm the existence of aliens and release information about them.

In April 2012, Disclose.tv announced a redesign of its website. During the 2010s, Disclose.tv's content became more political, with users' posts on the site casting doubt on the Russian interference in the 2016 United States elections and criticising "social justice warriors", which Logically said was indicative of "the right-wing undercurrent of the community".

In 2019, Disclose.tv removed its user-written articles and switched to primarily hosting forums; the website presented some of the forum posts as news articles on its social media accounts. In September 2021, it removed its old versions and cleared out its Twitter, Facebook and YouTube accounts, and announced to its users that it would be operating exclusively as a news website. Around the same time, the website published news articles that were backdated to September 2020, and many of which were plagiarised from a combination of reliable sources and other conspiracy theory websites.

In January 2022, after Logically sent a request for comment during its investigation of the website, Disclose.tv published an unsigned statement claiming to have never heard of Logically, stating it had "lost sight" of the hateful content being posted on its Discord channel despite claiming to have moderators and bots searching for such posts, and apologising for the examples of plagiarism listed in the investigation. The statement also targeted Logically reporter Ernie Piper by name. Logically noted that Disclose.tv had blocked many members of its editorial team on Twitter prior to the request for comment, despite claiming to have never heard of Logically. Piper said that the statement, part of which was described as being "ironic and mocking in tone", was "not a normal way for a media organization to respond to critical coverage", and added that it was "alarming" and "in and of itself a threat" that Disclose.tv had published his name to its followers.

== Influence ==
As of January 2022, Disclose.tv has social media accounts on Twitter (1 million followers as of 5 November 2022), Telegram (438,000 followers), YouTube (12,000 followers) and Facebook (3 million followers), as well as the far-right platforms Gettr (612,000 followers) and Gab (199,000 followers). Between September 2021 and January 2022, Disclose.tv also maintained a Discord server. Disclose.tv's content has been promoted by QAnon conspiracy theorists and shared on COVID-19 misinformation groups on Telegram.

Miro Dittrich, a senior researcher for the Center for Monitoring, Analysis and Strategy (CeMAS), a German extremism monitoring agency, said that Disclose.tv "is an exception in terms of its reach" in relation to other fringe websites, and in how it is "trying to portray itself as not being a German outlet" and reusing American far-right sources' talking points. Dittrich and Stephan Mündges, the head of the Technical University of Dortmund's Journalism Institute, said that the biggest threat from outlets like Disclose.tv is their ability to present conspiracy theories, disinformation and misleading stories as factual news. Mündges noted, "They call themselves 'alternative media.' And not everything they publish is completely false, there can be a true story that is then given a strong slant in a certain direction."

In January 2022, Logically reported that Holocaust denial, neo-Nazism and other forms of hate speech were flourishing on Disclose.tv's Discord and Telegram groups, which included users displaying the swastika and sharing the neo-Nazi propaganda film Europa: The Last Battle on its Telegram group. Logically reporter Ernie Piper explained, "They had a disclaimer saying 'no Nazi BS,' but were at best negligent and at worst freely allowing extreme anti-Semitism on their channels." Promoting or platforming Holocaust denial is illegal in Germany, with a punishment of up to five years in prison. Following Logically's request for comment, Disclose.tv closed its Discord server. Germany's Federal Criminal Police Office (BKA) said that Disclose.tv was "known" to them, but did not comment further on the extent to which they were monitoring its channels.

In December 2024, the Southern Poverty Law Center reported that Disclose.tv's Telegram channel serves as an influential bridge between disparate far-right extremist channels. Telegram recommends that visitors to Disclose.tv's channel follow similar channels, including white nationalist channel Red Ice, incel channel Femoids Unleashed and neo-Nazi accelerationist channel Zoomerwaffen.

== Content ==
Disclose.tv in June 2021

Disclose.tv presents itself as a news aggregator on its social media platforms, promoting conspiracy theories and misleading information together with real news taken from other sources frequently without attribution. It has misrepresented past events as having taken place in the present, such as reporting on a March 2020 curfew in Bavaria in October 2021. Logically noted that over half of Disclose.tv's eight most popular tweets featured no attribution as of January 2022, and stated that the website's continued uncritical coverage of conspiracy narratives and UFOs since its September 2021 relaunch revealed its links to pseudoscience and conspiracy theories.

Dittrich stated that the website often creates content "that doesn't look like it's conspiracy-driven" and is occasionally shared by "apolitical people or people on the left who don't know its true purpose". Mündges said that it was not very common for a Germany-based website to be producing content in another language for an international audience, adding: "It is more common that items from the English-language media, for example the 'Stop the steal' narrative, are taken and translated into German".

=== Prior to 2021 relaunch ===
In 2012, Disclose.tv published a story titled "List of All FEMA Concentration Camps in America Revealed", which was shared by American far-right conspiracy theorist Alex Jones. In 2015, skeptic Brian Dunning listed Disclose.tv at #6 on his "Top 10 Worst Anti-Science Websites" list, calling it "the National Enquirer of the 21st century. Aliens, UFOs, mermaids, Planet X, ghosts, ancient mysteries... anything you'd expect to find in a supermarket tabloid, you can find on the pages of Disclose.tv."

In August 2016, Disclose.tv published an article falsely claiming that Edward Snowden was pronounced dead by his girlfriend in Russia. In September, Disclose.tv claimed that NASA had admitted to being in contact with aliens and had not formally announced the information due to believing that everyone was already aware of it; Snopes traced the source of the claim to Waterford Whispers News, an Irish satirical news website.

In 2017, PolitiFact included Disclose.tv in its list of fake news websites.

In May 2018, Disclose.tv published an article claiming that vaccines contain "cancer enzymes". The fact-checking website Health Feedback noted that the "enzymes" referred to in the article seemed to be nagalase, which is not in any vaccine. The claim was repeated on websites such as GlobalResearch.ca and Natural News.

In October 2018, Disclose.tv published a story claiming that a Zimbabwean man had created an electric car that did not require charging. PolitiFact rated the claim "Pants on Fire", noting that the man's claims had already been reported on in 2015, and that the Zimbabwean technology news website TechZim had noted that the car was outside of the Law of Conservation of Energy.

=== COVID-19 misinformation ===
Disclose.tv promotes anti-vaccine and anti-lockdown narratives, and misrepresents developments related to COVID-19. A study published in March 2021 in the Online Social Networks and Media journal identified Disclose.tv as a purveyor of disinformation during the COVID-19 pandemic.

In March 2021, Disclose.tv misrepresented a report on vaccine passports published by The Washington Post to falsely claim that the Biden administration would both mandate the use of a passport and maintain the system that runs it.

In July 2021, Disclose.tv tweeted that 60% of people being admitted to hospitals in the United Kingdom had received two doses of the COVID-19 vaccine. The claim was based on an incorrect statistic given by Patrick Vallance, the Chief Scientific Advisor for the UK; Vallance issued a statement on Twitter with the correct statistic, which was that 60% of people being hospitalized were unvaccinated. Disclose.tv subsequently deleted its tweet.

In October 2021, Disclose.tv published an article titled "German court declares Corona curfew unconstitutional", which referred to a March 2020 curfew in Bavaria that was retroactively ruled unconstitutional by the State Court.

In February 2022, Disclose.tv shared on Twitter a Reuters article with the incorrect headline "Japan's Kowa says that ivermectin effective against Omicron in phase III trial". The tweet was reshared by podcaster Joe Rogan. Reuters subsequently corrected its headline and article to note that the research conducted by Kowa was non-clinical research; the correction was shared by Disclose.tv, which still falsely stated that ivermectin was "effective against Omicron in phase III trial".

In March 2024, Disclose.tv republished an op-ed by Paul Marik and Pierre Kory in The Hill claiming that long COVID was caused by COVID-19 vaccination instead of COVID-19 infection. The fact-checking website Health Feedback found that the op-ed relied on anecdotes that did not provide evidence to support the claim.

== Operation ==
Disclose.tv is owned by Futurebytes GmbH & Co. KG, which describes itself as a "private equity company" and is based in Passau. Futurebytes is registered with the District Court of Passau and its described purpose is e-commerce, marketing and advertising. Futurebytes is owned by Uwe Braun, a Cologne-based entrepreneur who has made money in Internet hosting businesses, with his company Host Europe being sold to GoDaddy for €1.69 billion ($1.82 billion) in 2016. Braun has not publicly acknowledged his connection to Disclose.tv. In the website's imprint, Braun is named as the legally responsible person.

In January 2022, Logically reported that all of the website's articles were attributed to only four writers, none of whom had links to personal websites, social media or biographies, and their profile pictures were fakes generated by generative AI. The writers' articles also appeared to have been written by a native German speaker.

== See also ==
- List of fake news websites
