= Pierre Kory =

American physician

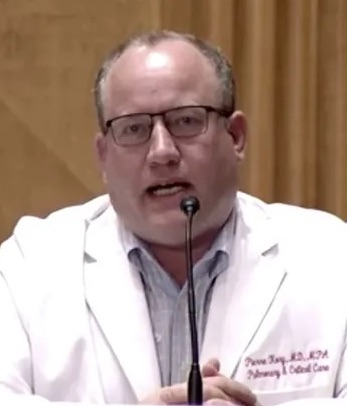
- Kory in front of the US Senate in 2020
- Education: St. George's University
- Known for: COVID-19 misinformation
- Medical career
- Field: Critical care medicine, Pulmonology
- Institutions: University of Wisconsin (former), Front Line COVID-19 Critical Care Alliance (current)

Pierre Kory is an American critical care physician who gained attention during the COVID-19 pandemic for advocating widespread off-label use of ineffective drug treatments for COVID-19, as president and co-founder of the Front Line COVID-19 Critical Care Alliance (FLCCC). Kory testified twice to the U.S. Senate regarding COVID-19. During his testimony in December 2020, Kory erroneously claimed that the antiparasitic medication ivermectin was a "wonder drug" with "miraculous effectiveness" against COVID-19.

In August 2023, the American Board of Internal Medicine (ABIM) informed Kory his certifications were to be revoked for spreading medical misinformation. As of August 2024, Kory's three certifications are listed as "not certified, revoked" on ABIM's website.

== Education and career ==
Kory graduated from NYU's school of Public Service with a Master's In Public Administration. He completed his medical education at St. George's University in Grenada, West Indies, graduating with a Doctor of Medicine (MD) degree and completed residency and fellowship training in critical care and pulmonary medicine. He did clinical rotations at the Weill Cornell School of Medicine. Kory first practiced in Madison, Wisconsin, at UW Health, which is the academic medical center at the University of Wisconsin. He served there as the medical director for the Trauma and Life Support Center, in the outpatient pulmonary medicine clinic, where he performed bronchoscopic and pleural procedures. Kory was the critical care service chief at the UW Health University Hospital (part of the University of Wisconsin School of Medicine and Public Health) until May 2020. He later joined Aurora St. Luke's Medical Center in Milwaukee, Wisconsin, before becoming a locum tenens physician.

Kory is an expert in critical care ultrasonography. In 2015, along with his two co-editors, Kory won the British Medical Association's 2015 President’s Choice award in medical textbooks for their work on Point of Care Ultrasound.

In August 2023, Kory was informed by the American Board of Internal Medicine that his board certifications were to be revoked for "spreading false or inaccurate medical information".

== COVID-19 ==
Early in the COVID-19 pandemic, Kory advocated for using increasing doses of corticosteroids and anticoagulants for hospitalized people with COVID-19, at a time when the general recommendation was merely for supportive care. Kory sees subsequent evidence from the RECOVERY Trial, which showed benefit from lower doses of corticosteroids, as vindicating his approach; medical researcher Kevin J. Tracey has said it is still unknown whether Kory's approach was beneficial or harmful. Kory has used other drugs off-label in his treatment regimens, including famotidine and intravenous vitamin C. Kory gave testimony as a guest of U.S. Senator Ron Johnson at a May 5, 2020, Senate hearing in which he called for use of steroids in COVID-19 patients. He resigned from UW Health in May out of frustration of its reluctance to implement such measures.

Kory is president and co-founder of the Front Line COVID-19 Critical Care Alliance (FLCCC), a small U.S. organization of physicians and former journalists formed in April 2020 that advocates for ineffective COVID-19 treatments, including ivermectin. The FLCCC falsely states that ivermectin reduces viral load and accelerates recovery in patients, while the World Health Organization, U.S. Food and Drug Administration, and European Medicines Agency advise against the use of ivermectin outside of clinical trials.

On December 8, 2020, Kory was a witness at a Senate hearing called by the US Senate Homeland Security Committee Chair Ron Johnson, which was criticized as promoting fringe ideas about COVID-19. Kory described ivermectin as "miraculous" and as a "wonder drug" to be used against COVID-19. Video footage of his statements went viral on social media, receiving over one million views within a few days. Kory became a leading advocate of the use of ivermectin throughout the pandemic, promoting a conspiracy theory that its true effectiveness was being suppressed by the "Gods of Science" who wanted to monopolize scientific information. Kory resigned from Aurora St Luke's afterwards, claiming that new restrictions on his contract threatened to limit his freedom to speak.

In November 2021 the Journal of Intensive Care Medicine retracted a paper written by Kory, Paul E. Marik, and others. The retraction was triggered when it was found the paper misreported the mortality figures of people treated for COVID-19 with the FLCCC's "MATH+" protocol, falsely making it appear to be an effective treatment.

In February 2022, the American Journal of Therapeutics issued an expression of concern against a 2021 systematic review of which Kory had been lead author. The notice said there were suspicions about the integrity of the underlying data on which the paper depended to show that ivermectin was a viable treatment for COVID-19.

By July 2022, Kory had begun endorsing misinformation about COVID-19 vaccines, downplaying the COVID-19 vaccines' effectiveness and spreading conspiracy theories about their safety and unreported fatalities. Kory claimed on a conservative podcast that COVID-19 vaccines "are not safe or effective", despite acknowledging that "There's just tons of papers in journals showing that the vaccines are safe and effective." As of August 2021, studies reported that the COVID-19 vaccines available in the United States are "highly protective against severe illness, hospitalization, and death due to COVID-19". In comparison with fully vaccinated people, the CDC reported that unvaccinated people were 10 times more likely to be hospitalized and 11 times more likely to die.

Kory in August 2022 falsely claimed that vaccines can disrupt pregnancy and fertility, based on his reading of Pfizer data submitted to the FDA, an interpretation which is not supported by peer-reviewed evidence. He represented the rates of miscarriage after COVID vaccination as alarming, when the rates are in fact consistent with background miscarriage rates of 11-16 percent in the general population. Multiple studies have shown that COVID infection, not vaccination against COVID-19, is risky for pregnant women. One study found that the risk of fetal or newborn mortality is higher in unvaccinated pregnant women who contract COVID, than it is for vaccinated women infected with COVID at the same stage of pregnancy. Further, according to studies cited by the CDC, there is no evidence of decreased fertility due to COVID vaccination now or in the future, and changes in menstrual cycles are small and temporary.

Kory repeatedly questions peer-reviewed science on COVID, the COVID-19 vaccine emergency use authorization process overseen by federal agencies, and the profit motives of pharmaceutical companies, while he also profits from marketing off-label and "alternative" COVID treatments that are lacking in quality evidence. His rhetoric carries many of the markings of conspiracy theory, which make emotional arguments that presume malfeasance and coordinated efforts and deliberate obfuscation of information. Such theories become ingrained in in-groups as a form of secret knowledge, which reinforces the fervor with which the ideas are believed. Kory's detractors such as David Gorski have noted his efforts to promote and profit from alternative COVID treatments are similar to medical quackery going back centuries.

In June 2022, Kory tweeted that the American Board of Internal Medicine had warned him that his board certifications were in danger of being revoked for misinformation. Effectively unable to practice within mainstream medicine, Kory launched his own “advanced COVID-19 care center", charging US$1,250 to 1,650 for a series of three appointments.

In November 2022, Kory and the FLCCC began marketing a cocktail of supplements and drugs (e.g. ivermectin and nitazoxanide) for other viruses, influenza and Respiratory syncytial virus (RSV). Like the FLCCC-advocated COVID treatments, the recommendations lacked credible supporting scientific evidence. The Washington Post estimated that this cocktail could cost over $500.

In March 2024, Kory and Paul Marik published an op-ed in The Hill claiming that long COVID was caused by COVID-19 vaccination instead of COVID-19 infection. The op-ed was republished by Disclose.tv, a German disinformation outlet. The fact-checking website Health Feedback found that the op-ed relied on anecdotes that did not provide evidence to support the claim.

== Measles ==
Kory has claimed that the recent death of a child in Texas from measles was due to incorrect antibiotic management of a bacterial pneumonia infection that had “little to do with measles.” Robert F. Kennedy, Jr., the current Health and Human Services secretary, has relied heavily on Kory's erroneous take on the child's cause of death. Kory appeared with Kennedy at various campaign-related events in the lead-up to the 2024 presidential election.

== Vaccines ==
Kory has said, including in a 2025 debate on the online debate platform Pangburn that not only are Covid-19 and measles vaccines causing various forms of harm, but that all vaccines across the board are harmful. However, he did not specify specific harms or mechanisms by which vaccines cause said harm; Kory claimed that asking for such a mechanism is a dishonest debate tactic.

== Books ==
- Soni, Nilam J; Arntfield, Robert; Kory, Pierre, eds. (2015). Point of Care Ultrasound. Elsevier. ISBN 978-0323544702.
