= James Rippe =

American cardiologist

James M. Rippe (born June 26, 1947) is an American cardiologist. He is the founder and director of the Rippe Lifestyle Institute, located in Shrewsbury, Massachusetts.

== Education ==
Rippe received his B.A. from Harvard College in 1969 and his M.D. from Harvard Medical School in 1979.

== Career ==
From 1983 to 1993, Rippe worked at the Exercise Physiology and Nutrition Laboratory at the University of Massachusetts Medical School. He was an associate professor of medicine at Tufts University from 1994 to 2012. From 2005 to 2010, he was a professor of biomedical sciences at the University of Central Florida, where he was also the chairman of the Center for Lifestyle Medicine. He is currently a Professor of Medicine at the University of Massachusetts Medical School.

== Research ==
Rippe's research has found that the health benefits of exercise extend to mild exercises, such as walking, and that the benefit from walking is about the same regardless of walking speed. He has been described as "a founder of the fitness walking movement."

According to the New York Times, he received $10 million in funds between 2010 and 2014 from the Corn Refiners Association to study the health effects of high fructose corn syrup and published reports "disputing any special health consequences associated with the corn-based sweeter." He also received a $41,000-a-month fee from the association, which the Times said was for him "to serve as an outside expert whom it repeatedly asked to send commentary pieces to local newspapers and dispute any claims that consuming high-fructose corn syrup in foods was any riskier than sugar."

Rippe is the editor-in-chief of the American Journal of Lifestyle Medicine, as well as the co-editor-in-chief of the Journal of Intensive Care Medicine. Rippe has published 56 books, including Encyclopedia of Lifestyle Medicine and Health, Obesity Prevention and Treatment, Lifestyle Medicine Third Edition, and Nutrition in Lifestyle Medicine.
