= SocArXiv =

Open archive of the social sciences

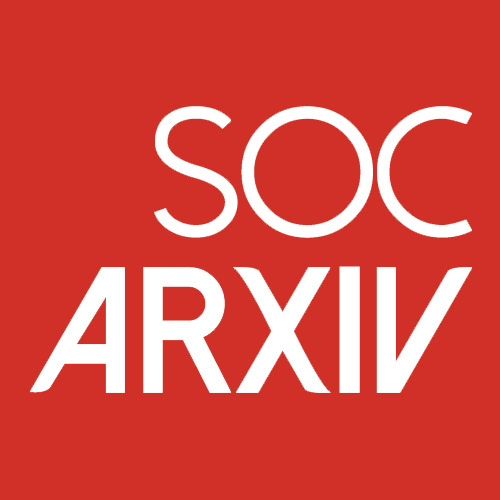
- Producer: (United States)
- History: 2016 to present

Access
- Providers: Center for Open Science
- Cost: Free

Coverage
- Disciplines: Social sciences, education, law
- Format coverage: preprints, postprints, working papers

Links
- Website: osf.io/preprints/socarxiv

SocArXiv is an online paper server for the social sciences founded by sociologist Philip N. Cohen in partnership with the non-profit Center for Open Science. It is an open archive based on the ArXiv preprint server model used for the natural sciences, mathematics, and computer science. The site describes itself as an "open archive of the social sciences, [which] provides a free, non-profit, open access platform for social scientists to upload working papers, preprints, and published papers, with the option to link data and code." It also hosts papers in the areas of education and law.

The database was launched in 2016, shortly after the purchase of the Social Science Research Network by Elsevier, to meet "a need for a new general, open-access, open-source, paper server for the social sciences, one that encourages linking and sharing data and code, that serves its research to an open metadata system, and that provides the foundation for a post-publication review system." It was built of the Open Science Framework platform, initially as a program of the University of Maryland. In 2021, the University of Maryland Libraries became the institutional home of SocArXiv.

In addition to providing a forum for pre-publication papers as a matter of improving transparency and efficiency, Cohen has called for a central repository for peer-reviews of papers even when the reviews lead to the paper being declined for publication.

As of May 2022, SocArXiv hosted more than 10,000 papers.

== See also ==
- List of academic databases and search engines
- List of preprint repositories
