= Philip N. Cohen =

American sociologist

- Philip N. Cohen
- Born: 1967 (age 58–59)
- Education: University of Michigan (BA); University of Massachusetts (MA in Sociology); University of Maryland (PhD in Sociology)
- Scientific career
- Fields: Sociology and demography
- Workplaces: University of California, Irvine (1999-2005), University of North Carolina (2005-2011), University of Maryland (2011-)
- Website: philipncohen.com

Philip N. Cohen is an American sociologist. He is a professor of sociology at the University of Maryland, College Park, and director of SocArXiv, an open archive of the social sciences.

== Early life ==
Cohen grew up in Ithaca, New York and attended the Lehman Alternative Community School.

== Career ==
Cohen graduated from the University of Michigan with a B.A. in American Culture, from the University of Massachusetts with an M.A. in sociology, and from the University of Maryland with a Ph.D. in sociology. His previous faculty positions were at the University of North Carolina and the University of California, Irvine.

He is a sociologist and demographer who works in the areas of families and inequality, social demography, and social inequality. His concerns include gender and race/ethnic inequality, unpaid housework and care work, health disparities, demographic measurement, and open science.

He is a former member of the American Sociological Association (ASA) Committee on Publications, and chair of the ASA's section on Sociology of the Family. He also is an Associate of the Maryland Population Research Center, and was formerly secretary-treasurer of the ASA Population Section. He was co-editor, with Syed Ali, of Contexts, the quarterly magazine of the ASA, from 2014 to 2017.

Since 2016, he has been the director of SocArXiv, and has devoted increasing efforts to the movement for open science, including research in scholarly communication. In 2021, Cohen left the American Sociological Association, citing what he called its high costs, lack of capacity for change, inequitable practices, and opposition to open access and open science in its publications.

== Books ==
Cohen has written three books:

- The Family: Diversity, Inequality, and Social Change, first published in 2014 by W. W. Norton & Company; the fourth edition was published in 2024.
- Citizen Scholar: Public Engagement for Social Scientists, published in 2025 by Columbia University Press.
- Enduring Bonds: Inequality, Marriage, Parenting, and Everything Else That Makes Families Great and Terrible, published in 2018 by the University of California Press.

He is co-editor, with Syed Ali, of The Contexts Reader, a collection of essays from the magazine Contexts, the quarterly magazine of the American Sociological Association.

== Research ==
His work on labor market inequality has focused on race/ethnic and gender inequality in the United States. On race, he has published in the American Journal of Sociology (with Matt Huffman) and Social Forces, assessing the relationship between demographic composition of labor markets and patterns of inequality.

In the area of gender inequality, his research (with Matt Huffman) has addressed occupational segregation and gender devaluation and the effects of women in workplace management positions. Alone as well as with a number of different co-authors, he has published research on the gender division of household labor.

On family structure, he has addressed issues of measurement, including how to identify cohabiting couples in U.S. Census data., and the language used for marriage (homogamy and heterogamy).

On health disparities, he has studied the COVID-19 pandemic in rural U.S. counties, marriage and mortality, disability rates among adopted children, the living arrangements of children with disabilities, the relationship between parental age and childhood disability, and race/ethnic disparities in infant mortality.

Some of Cohen's research is part of the tradition of intersectionality, including his work on the American women's suffrage movement; and on the relationship between population composition and inequality by race, class and gender.

== Congressional testimony ==
In 2007, Cohen testified before the U.S. Senate Committee on Health, Education, Labor, and Pensions, on equal pay for women workers. The legislation under consideration at that hearing eventually became the Lilly Ledbetter Fair Pay Act of 2009.

== Public work ==
Cohen has been the author of the Family Inequality blog since 2009.

His writing has appeared in The New York Times Sunday Review, The Washington Post, The Chronicle of Higher Education, The Daily Beast, Boston Review, CNN, the Hill, The New Republic, and others.

In 2011 he served as a consultant to the United States Census Bureau for its release of the first enumeration of same-sex married couples from the 2010 decennial census.

Cohen is an advocate for open scholarship and open access for academic research. He organized SocArXiv, an open research repository for the social sciences. SocArXiv launched Open Scholarship for the Social Sciences (O3S), a conference at the University of Maryland, in 2017.

He was a plaintiff in the lawsuit Knight First Amendment Institute v. Trump, filed July 11, 2017. In the lawsuit, a group of Twitter users blocked by U.S. President Donald Trump's account alleged that this blocking was a violation of their First Amendment rights. The case was decided in the plaintiffs' favor on May 23, 2018, and that decision was upheld by the United States Court of Appeals for the Second Circuit. After Trump's presidency ended before the Supreme Court heard his appeal, the Court vacated the decision as moot on April 5, 2021.

In 2021 Cohen organized an open letter of more than 150 demographers and social scientists to the Pew Research Center, urging them to stop using generation labels in their analysis of social trends. In 2023, after an extensive review of their research and methods, Pew announced a change in their use of generation labels, to "avoid reinforcing harmful stereotypes or oversimplifying people's complex lived experiences" and said, in the future, "our audiences should not expect to see a lot of new research coming out of Pew Research Center that uses the generational lens.
