= Heather Heying =

American evolutionary biologist

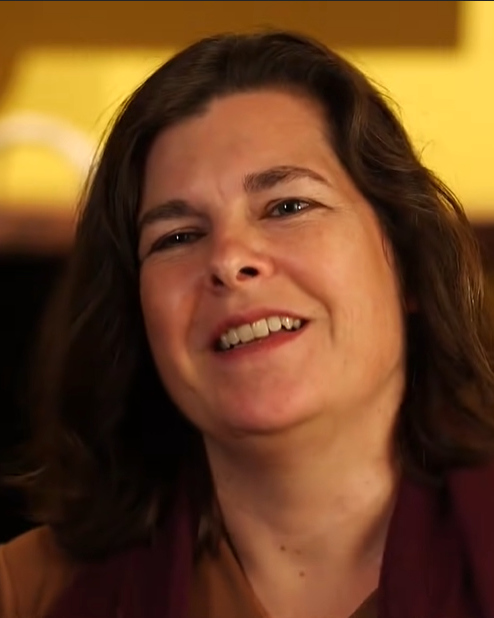
- Heying in 2019
- Education: University of California, Santa Cruz (BA); University of Michigan (PhD)
- Occupations: Author, podcaster
- Spouse: Bret Weinstein
- Scientific career
- Fields: Evolutionary biology
- Thesis: The evolutionary ecology and sexual selection of a Madagascan poison frog (Mantella laevigata) (2001)
- Doctoral advisor: Arnold Kluge
- Website: www.heatherheying.com

Heather E. Heying (born 1969) is an American evolutionary biologist, former professor, and author, who came to national attention following the Evergreen State College protests in 2017. She has been associated with the informal group known as the intellectual dark web and testified at the US Department of Justice forum on Free Speech on College Campuses in 2018. Heying opposed COVID-19 vaccines and promoted the unproven belief that the drug ivermectin is effective in treating the disease.

== Early life and education ==
Heying was born in Santa Monica, California in 1969 and grew up in Los Angeles. She obtained a BA degree in Anthropology from the University of California, Santa Cruz in 1992, and subsequently went to the University of Michigan in Ann Arbor where she received a PhD in Biology in 2001, with the dissertation titled "The evolutionary ecology and sexual selection of a Madagascan poison frog (Mantella laevigata)."

== Career ==
Until 2017, Heying was a professor of biology at Evergreen State College. Her doctoral research focused on the evolutionary ecology and sexual selection of Mantella laevigata, a Madagascan poison frog. In addition to papers in the reproductive evolutionary adaptations of frogs, Heying has also published a popular work describing her graduate student research in Madagascar, Antipode: Seasons with the Extraordinary Wildlife and Culture of Madagascar (2002).

=== Evergreen State College protests ===
In July 2017, following a year of student protests at Evergreen State College, which disrupted the campus, including one altercation between protesters and Heying's husband and fellow professor of biology at Evergreen, Bret Weinstein, the pair brought a lawsuit against the college; the $3.85 million suit alleged the college failed to "protect its employees from repeated provocative and corrosive verbal and written hostility based on race, as well as threats of physical violence." A settlement was reached in September 2017, in which both Heying and Weinstein resigned, and received $250,000 each.

=== Post-Evergreen ===
Following her resignation, Heying has written articles and opinion pieces related to evolution and cultural politics for journals and newspapers such as The New York Times and The Chronicle of Higher Education. She co-hosts a weekly podcast, the Darkhorse Podcast, with her husband on his YouTube channel.

Heying was a 2019–2020 James Madison Program Visiting Fellow at Princeton University, a fellowship which continued for the 2020–2021 year. With Weinstein, they presented a theory on the evolutionary adaptation of consciousness on April 29, 2020.

In 2021, Heying and Weinstein's book, A Hunter-Gatherer's Guide to the 21st Century, was published. Reviewing it for The Guardian, Stuart J. Ritchie wrote that the authors "lazily repeat false information from other pop-science books," and that overall the book was characterized by an annoying, know-it-all attitude. Writing for Willamette Week, Nancy Koppelman and Leo Blakeslee said that the book did well at covering basic topics around evolution and biology, but faltered when the authors claim expertise beyond their own fields such as in matters related to politics. Another review, written for Areo Magazine by English Literature graduate Daniel James Sharp, said the book was "a great, if also greatly flawed, achievement."

== COVID-19 ==
On January 29, 2021, Heying appeared on Real Time with Bill Maher along with Weinstein, discussing the "Lab Leak" hypothesis around the origins of SARS-CoV-2.

Heying has said that she has taken ivermectin to guard against COVID-19 and that she and Weinstein have not been vaccinated "because we have fears [about the side-effects of the COVID-19 vaccines], as we have discussed at length on this podcast." Heying compared the use of ivermectin for this purpose to taking anti-malarial drugs. Whereas all WHO-approved vaccines have shown a high level of safety and efficacy in all populations, there is no good evidence of benefit from ivermectin in preventing or treating COVID-19.

== Publications ==
- Heying, Heather; Weinstein, Bret (2021), A Hunter-Gatherer's Guide to the 21st Century: Evolution and the Challenges of Modern Life, Portfolio, p. 320, ISBN 978-0593086889
- Heying, Heather E. (2001). The evolutionary ecology and sexual selection of a Madagascan poison frog (Mantella laevigata). Dissertation.
