= American Journal of Therapeutics =

- Discipline: Pharmacology
- Language: English
- Edited by: Peter Manu

Publication details
- History: 1994–present
- Publisher: Wolters Kluwer
- Frequency: Bimonthly
- Impact factor: 2.688 (2021)

Standard abbreviations
- ISO 4: Am. J. Ther.

Indexing
- CODEN: AJTHFG
- ISSN: 1075-2765 (print); 1536-3686 (web)
- OCLC no.: 605159959

Links
- Journal homepage; Online access; Online archive

The American Journal of Therapeutics is a bimonthly medical journal covering advances in drug therapy, comparative effectiveness research, and post-marketing surveillance. The journal was established in 1994 by John Somberg MD and is published by Wolters Kluwer. The editor-in-chief since 2015 is Peter Manu MD, Professor of Medicine at the Zucker School of Medicine at Hofstra/Northwell, Hofstra University, Hempstead, NY.

The journal has been part of the Web of Science Core Collection since 2010. According to the Journal Citation Reports, the journal has a 2022 impact factor of 4.2 The journal is included in the Index Medicus (MEDLINE).
