= Journal of Intensive Care Medicine =

- Discipline: Intensive-care medicine
- Language: English
- Edited by: James M. Rippe, Nicholas Smyrnios

Publication details
- History: 1986-present
- Publisher: SAGE Publications
- Frequency: Bimonthly
- Impact factor: 3.262 (2015)

Standard abbreviations
- ISO 4: J. Intensive Care Med.

Indexing
- ISSN: 0885-0666 (print); 1525-1489 (web)
- OCLC no.: 731011131

Links
- Journal homepage; Online access; Online archive

The Journal of Intensive Care Medicine is a bimonthly peer-reviewed medical journal covering research in the field of intensive-care medicine. The editors-in-chief are James M. Rippe and Nicholas Smyrnios (University of Massachusetts Medical School). It was established in 1986 and is currently published by SAGE Publications.

== Abstracting and indexing ==
The Journal of Intensive Care Medicine is abstracted and indexed in:

- CINAHL
- EMBASE
- InfoTrac
- MEDLINE
- Scopus
