= Migrant detentions under the first Trump administration =

2019–2020 political controversy

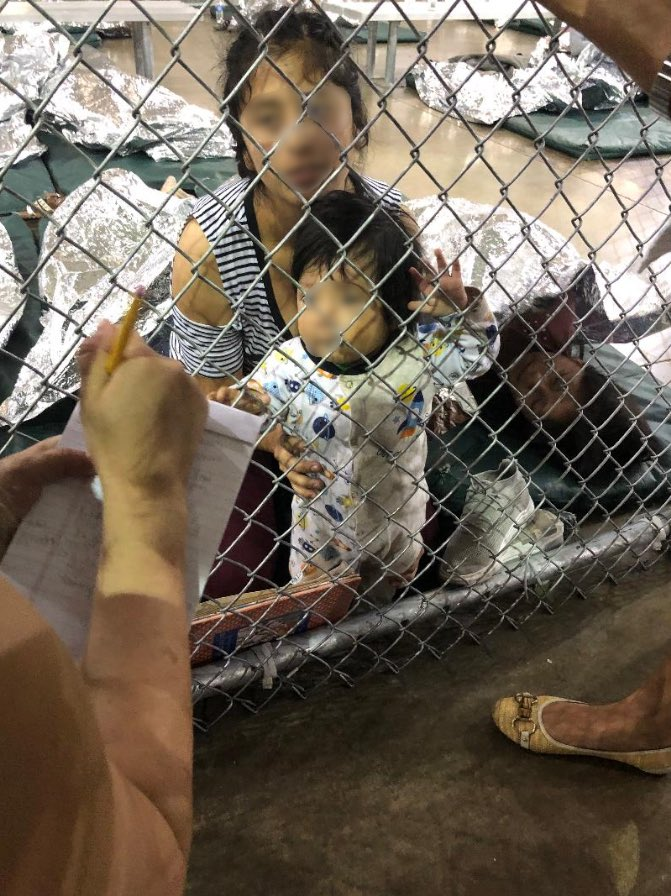
Woman-and-child migrants detained in cage in July 2019 at the Ursula detention facility in McAllen, Texas, the United States.

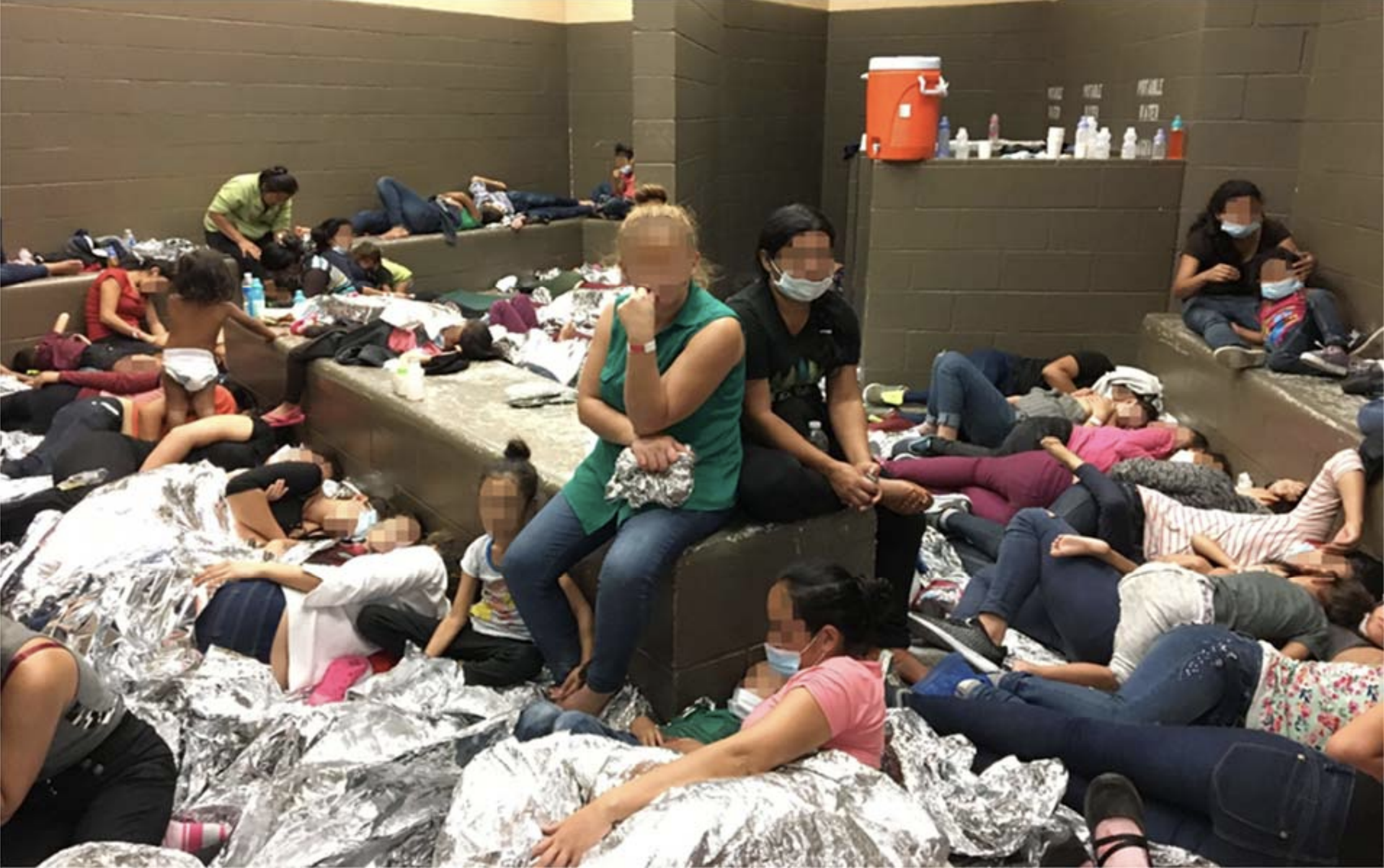
Overcrowded conditions for migrant families detained in Weslaco, Texas were reported by inspectors from the federal government in June 2019.

The Trump administration has detained migrants attempting to enter the United States at the United States–Mexico border. Government reports from the Department of Homeland Security Office of Inspector General in May 2019 and July 2019 found that migrants had been detained under conditions that failed federal standards. These conditions have included prolonged detention, overcrowding, and poor hygiene and food standards.

The United States has a history of detaining migrants from Central America since the 1970s under the presidency of Jimmy Carter, with boat migrations from the Caribbean resulting in detentions from the 1980s onwards, under the presidency of Ronald Reagan. Since the 2000s, prosecutions of migrants who illegally crossed the border became a priority under the presidency of George W. Bush and the presidency of Barack Obama. The Trump administration took a stricter approach than did previous administrations regarding migrant detentions, allowing no exemptions for detention, unlike the George W. Bush and Obama administrations.

== Background ==
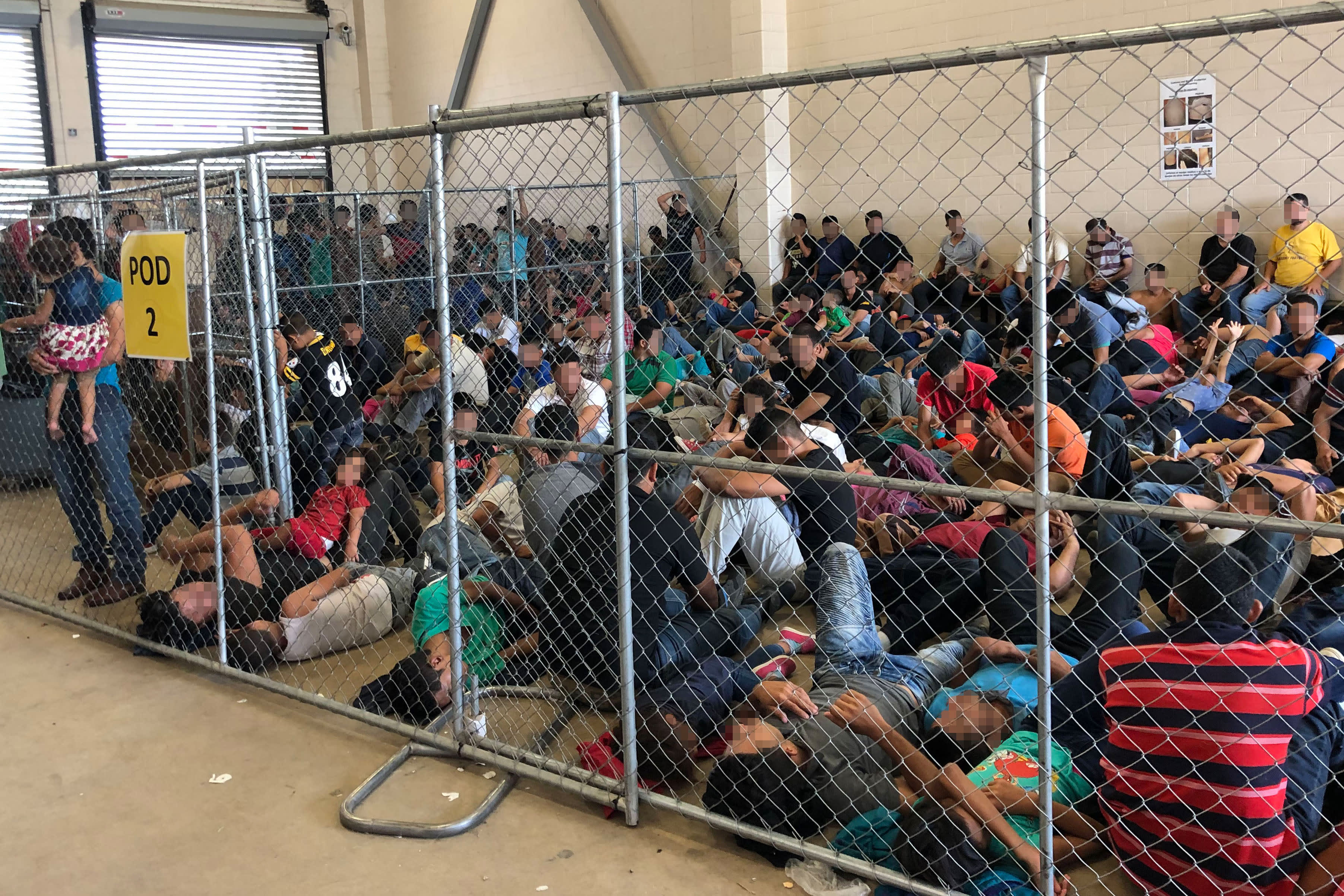
Overcrowded conditions for migrant detainees in McAllen, Texas were observed by inspectors from the federal government in June 2019.

Statistics from the U.S. Customs and Border Protection (CBP) showed that the number of migrants detained at the United States-Mexico border in 2017's financial year was around 300,000, the lowest number since 1971. In 2018's financial year the number was around 400,000. From the financial years of 2000 to 2008, the number was always higher than 600,000, with the highest being in 2000's financial year, with over 1.6 million migrants detained. From the financial years of 2009 to 2018, the number was always lower than 600,000.

Reasons for migrants to enter the United States include escaping violence and poverty in their country.

The responsibility for long-term detention of migrants falls under the purview of U.S. Immigration and Customs Enforcement, not CBP. Improper entry into the United States can result in a federal jail sentence of up to 180 days. Repeat offenders can be jailed up to two years, with extra years added if such a migrant has previous criminal convictions. At the time of the Trump administration, the state of immigration laws of the United States gives the executive branch significant leeway to decide which immigrants can be detained or released pending their hearings.

=== History of immigration to the United States ===
The United States has been described by many as a "nation of immigrants", but has not always treated immigrants well historically: for example, from 1790 to 1952, American law restricted naturalization to white immigrants. Around the 1910s (with the occurrence of World War I), Ellis Island, formerly an immigration conduit for migrants arriving by sea, became a detention and deportation center for migrants.

Immigration from Mexico was nearly unrestricted in the United States until the late 1920s. Despite American nativist and xenophobic sentiments since the 1880s that Mexicans were of an inferior race, the need for labor temporarily trumped that sentiment. In 1929, the United States passed Section 1325 of Title 8 of the United States Code, that made crossing the U.S.-Mexican border without authorization a federal crime. Also, 1929's stock market crash and increasing unemployment led to "repatriation drives" by local and federal officials, active campaigns and raids through the 1930s by Americans that resulted in hundreds of thousands of Mexican immigrants being deported, even if many (and their children) were by that time American citizens or had entered the U.S. legally. The post-World War II Bracero Program of 1944 to 1964 allowed for legal immigration from Mexico as laborers, but resulted in an increase in illegal immigration. As such, 1954's Operation Wetback to deport millions of illegal immigrants coming from Mexico was enacted, with periodic deportation drives continuing in the years ahead. The Immigration and Nationality Act of 1965 resulted in the establishment of a quota for immigration to the U.S. from the Western Hemisphere, which resulted in an increase in illegal immigration from Mexico. Expanding agricultural and service sectors in the United States spurred even higher illegal immigration from Mexico and other countries of the Western Hemisphere in the 1980s and 1990s.

=== Trump administration actions ===
In January 2017, Trump declared that 11 million immigrants in the United States would be targeted for detentions and deportation, including legal migrants who had previously committed a crime but not been arrested.

In January 2019, Trump made 8 claims in 12 days that human traffickers transport women across the Mexico-U.S. border by putting them in vehicles and taping their mouths. He said that this was a common scenario, but experts attested no knowledge of such matters occurring. There have also been no news reports of such matters. After Trump made these claims, Border Patrol leadership asked their agents to speedily provide "any information" on Trump's claims.

Also in January 2019, White House Press Secretary Sarah Sanders falsely stated that CBP had apprehended almost 4,000 known or suspected terrorists "that came across our southern border." 3,755 known or suspected terrorists were indeed apprehended in the fiscal year of 2017, but this included those who entered from airports and seaports (the majority of those apprehended were at airports). NBC News reported that from October 2017 to March 2018, the Trump administration only apprehended 41 known or suspected terrorists at the southern border, of which 35 were American citizens or lawful permanent residents. In 2017, the State Department had reported that there is "no credible evidence terrorist groups sent operatives via Mexico into the United States". Questioned on Sanders' false claims, Vice President Mike Pence said that "3,000 special interest individuals, people with suspicious backgrounds that might suggest terrorist connections were apprehended at our southern border". Homeland Security Secretary Kirstjen Nielsen made a similar claim. However, special interest aliens refer to people coming from a country that has produced terrorists – special interest aliens not necessarily suspected terrorists themselves.

In February 2019, Trump declared a National Emergency Concerning the Southern Border of the United States, attributing it to an influx of migrants who would commit criminal activities in the United States. Maria Sacchetti of The Washington Post responded that in that month, more than 60% of the immigrants detained by U.S. Immigration and Customs Enforcement have no criminal history.

In June 2019, the United States Senate passed 84–8 a bipartisan bill providing around $4.6 billion of funds, including $1.1 billion for U.S. Customs and Border Protection to improve facilities and care for migrants, and around $2.9 billion for United States Department of Health and Human Services to improve conditions for migrant children in their case. Also that month, the United States House of Representatives passed 305–102 the same version of the bill as the Senate, despite objections from Democrats wanting more protections for migrant children and more means to ensure accountability for the funds.

In 2025, under the Trump administration, the budget of ICE increased to more than 85 billion dollars, following the One Big Beautiful Bill Act, which is an increase by more than 600% compared to 2024

=== Comparison with past administrations ===
Video of a June 2018 tour of the Ursula detention facility in McAllen, Texas. Migrants are still interned here as of January 2026.

Professor Kevin Johnson, writing in the Santa Clara Law Review in 2017, described that defenders of the Trump administration's immigration policies have claimed that the policies were a continuation of the previous administration's policies under Barack Obama. Johnson refuted this by asserting that the Trump administration's policies "differ in important respects" from the Obama administration's. Immigration policies under Obama featured both "tough enforcement" and some "generosity". Trump has employed "systematic efforts to dramatically escalate immigration enforcement", while his administration has reduced or possibly removed "more generous treatment of immigrants subject to possible removal from the United States". Professor Johnson and Professor Rose Cuison-Villazor wrote for Wake Forest Law Review in May 2019 that the Trump administration's immigration policies are "tougher" than that of previous administrations under "any modern president". While the Reagan and Obama administrations employed detention of migrants, the Trump administration had mandatory detention, and "no previous administration resorted to the separation of families as a device to deter migration from Central America".

Rebecca Torres, published in 2018's Gender, Place & Culture, described that the Trump administration is "the most anti-refugee" and anti-immigrant administration "in recent U.S. history", with an increase in immigrant detentions and "unprecedented" actions taken against refugees and immigrants. It followed the Obama administration, which had featured a record number of deportations, as well as policies aimed at deterring Latin Americans from moving to the United States.

Robert Farley, Eugene Kiely and Lori Robertson of Factcheck.org responded to an April 2018 claim by President Trump that there were "ridiculous liberal (Democrat) laws like Catch & Release". They wrote that Trump's claim "distorts the facts". There were no laws instituted to mandate the practice of catch and release (which releases some migrants into the United States pending their immigration hearings, instead of detaining them), however, it was indeed a policy under previous administrations, due to exemptions to detention granted to certain children, families and asylum seekers. Under the Clinton administration in 1997, the legal case of the Flores Settlement Agreement resulted in the policy that unaccompanied migrant minors can only be detained for a maximum of 20 days before release. Under the Obama administration in 2015, a federal judge ruled that families with minors must be released as soon as possible. Additionally, migrants applying for asylum may also be released from detention under "humanitarian parole". However, other than these exemptions, the George W. Bush administration instituted a policy in 2006 that all other illegal immigrants crossing the border are to be detained until deportation, which was also continued under the Obama administration.

As covered by D'Angelo Gore of Factcheck.org in May 2018, President Trump falsely claimed that family separations with adult detentions were because of "bad laws that the Democrats gave us." In fact, it was Trump's own administration who that month instituted the policy of zero tolerance resulting in family separations, because the George W. Bush and Obama administrations detained families together. Gore noted that in 2008, George W. Bush, a Republican president, signed a bipartisan bill, the William Wilberforce Trafficking Victims Protection Reauthorization Act, mandating that unaccompanied migrant minors must be passed to American relatives or the Office of Refugee Resettlement, but this law does not mandate family separations, as the migrant parents are not required to be detained when their children are released.

Julie Hirschfeld Davis and Michael D. Shear of The New York Times wrote in June 2018 that the two administrations before Trump's, which were those of George W. Bush and Barack Obama, did not "embrace" detaining migrant families separately, unlike the Trump administration. George W. Bush's administration had in 2005 implemented Operation Streamline in parts of Texas, which would imprison and prosecute all illegal immigrants entering the country, with an eye for quick deportations. However, they also wrote that the George W. Bush administration "generally" allowed exemptions for children, families with minor children, as well as ill migrants. The Obama administration at one point reenacted Operation Streamline, but without prioritizing first-time illegal immigrants, and it detained families together in administrative detention, not criminal detention.

Miriam Valverde of Politifact assessed in November 2018 that Trump had falsely claimed that the Trump administration "had the exact same policy as the Obama administration" for family separations with adult prosecutions. There was no such policy under the Obama administration, whereas the Trump administration had the zero tolerance policy resulting in family separations. Although there were indeed some family separations under the Obama administration, Valvarde wrote that they were "relatively rare and nowhere near the scale under the Trump administration".

Judith Greene, stated in 2018's Social Justice that the Trump administration was no longer implementing "national detention standards" established in 2000 (under the Clinton administration) and improved upon by the Obama administration.

Jenna Loyd and Alison Mountz, writing in March 2019 for the NACLA Report on the Americas, state that the United States has "the world's largest system of deterrence, detention, and deportation", and that the Trump administration's immigration policies have "roots" leading back to the 1970s. The Carter administration detained migrants from Haiti in jails, while the Reagan administration "cemented and expanded" such methods to boat migrations arising from the Caribbean (including Cuba), a policy which remained even into the Trump administration. The Clinton administration held Haitian migrants seeking asylum in tents at Guantanamo Bay Naval Base. Under the administration of George H. W. Bush, migrants from Guatemala and El Salvador were given Temporary Protected Status, but under the Trump administration, such statuses were revoked for Haitians and people of other countries. Furthermore, the Trump administration has taken extra steps in attempting to remove processes for legal asylum claims via changing procedures of the Executive Office of Immigration Review.

Bea Bischoff of Slate wrote in June 2019 that "many of the current immigration enforcement actions that are receiving criticism under Trump were in place during the Obama administration." However, Bischoff wrote that the Trump administration's "policy changes and focus" on maximum deportations exacerbated the problem and resulted in "all-out chaos".

Leandra H. Hernández and Sarah De Los Santos Upton, in a July 2019 article for Frontiers in Communication, state that immigrants in the United States face "an ever more dismal horizon of rightlessness": the "immigration violation excesses" of the George W. Bush administration was continued by more "aggressive" border enforcement under the Obama administration, culminating in the Trump administration's detainment of children, family separations, and sexual abuses of migrant women and children.

Ricciardelli et al., writing for Critical Social Work in July 2019, describe that the Obama administration already "heightened" the usage of detention and deportations for migrants, but then the Trump administration took it to a "considerably" higher level.

== Funding ==
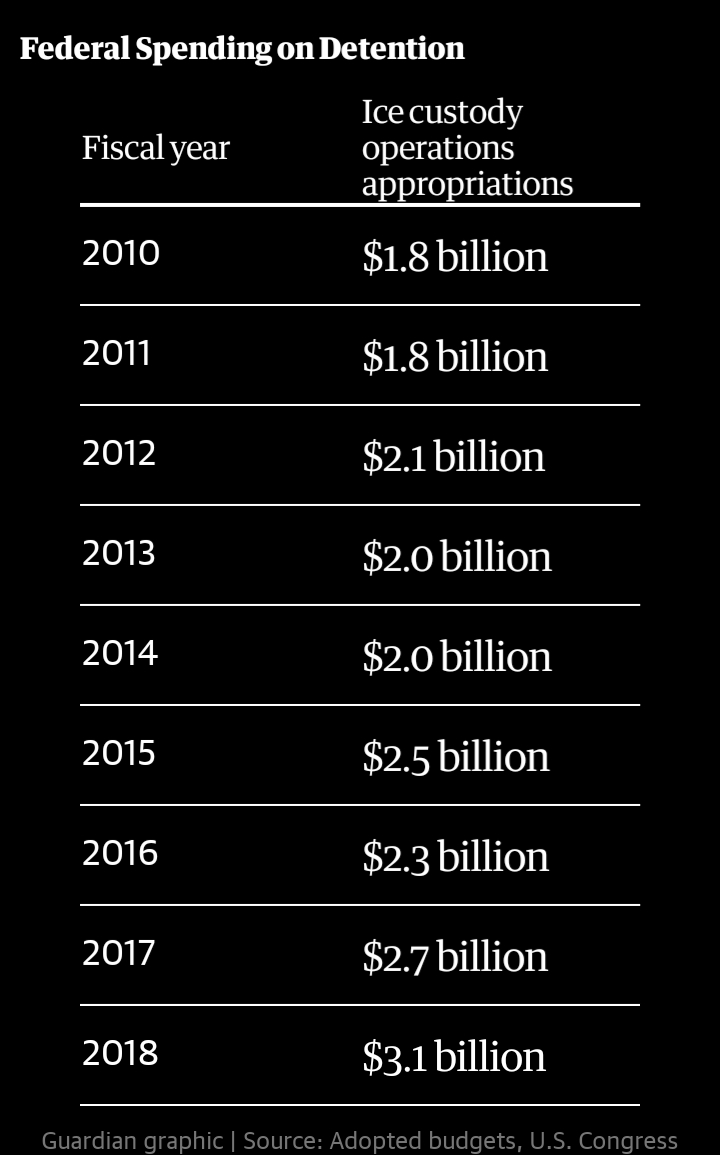
Table of federal spending on detention centers

On July 29, 2018, it was reported that the pension funds of Scotland's public service workers managed by finance firms, GEO Group and CoreCivic held at least £138 million in investment firms backing the detention centres. Upon this being known it was heavily criticised. Willie Rennie, leader of the Scottish Liberal Democrats said that: "The managers of these funds must think extremely carefully about who they hand their money to. Pension provision should not come at the expense of a system of abuse". Dave Watson, head of policy and public affairs at the Unison union, said: "Scottish local government pension funds need to do more to support ethical investment than bland policy statements. They need to look harder at where the money is going, including pooled nvestments [sic] that can mask bad practice. The workers who contribute to their pension funds expect their hard-earned contributions to be invested responsibly, in line with the values they live and work by." The Geo Group and Corecivic had previously donated $250,000 to Trump's inaugural committee. The GEO Group is currently being sued for alleged use of forced labour.

On August 27, 2019, it was announced that the government would move $271 million (~$327 million in 2024) in funds from the Department of Homeland Security to pay for migrant detention and courts. This decision was criticsed by U.S. Representative Lucille Roybal-Allard who said in a statement that: "Once again, DHS has ignored the negotiated agreement with Congress by vastly exceeding the amount appropriated for immigration enforcement and removal operations". House of Representatives Speaker Nancy Pelosi also criticised it, saying that: "Stealing from appropriated funds is always unacceptable, but to pick the pockets of disaster relief funding in order to fund an appalling, inhumane family incarceration plan is staggering – and to do so on the eve of hurricane season is stunningly reckless".

In 2019 Congress appropriated $2.8 billion (~$3.38 billion in 2024) to pay for 52,000 beds.

== Family separations ==
The Trump administration has separately detained migrant families, with adults being separated into criminal detention for prosecution, while the children were treated as unaccompanied alien minors. On May 5, 2019, the Trump administration officially began a "zero tolerance" policy towards illegal immigration, declaring that it would detain and prosecute every illegal immigrant, in contrast to a common previous practice (catch and release) of releasing migrants into the country while their immigration cases were processed. On June 20, 2019, President Trump issued an executive order that migrant families should be detained together; at that time, families were only supposed to be detained for a maximum of 20 days.

== Legal cases ==
In April 2018, a lawsuit was filed by the Center for Human Rights and Constitutional Law which alleged that migrant children detained at Texas' Shiloh Treatment Center were forcibly medicated with several psychotropic drugs.

In July 2018, a federal judge from the United States District Court for the Central District of California refused the Trump administration's request to change the Flores settlement and extend the allowed detention time of migrant children from 20 days to indefinite.

In June 2019, Trump administration official Sarah Fabian argued (in an appeal to a July 2017 verdict) that the Flores agreement mandating "safe and sanitary" conditions for detained migrant children was "vague" and it was not compulsory for the government to provide toothbrushes, soap or adequate bedding to them.

== Deaths ==
From December 2018 to July 2019, at least six child migrants have died while being detained by the Trump administration.

== Facilities ==
Cecilia Ayón, writing for Race and Social Problems, stated that the 2018 family separation policy, followed by the 2018 executive order to detain families together, "occurred on the heels of a booming growth in private detention facilities." For the financial year of 2017, two businesses (CoreCivic and GEO Group) that collectively operate more than half of private prison contracts (including immigration detention facilities) collected revenues of over $4 billion (~$5.02 billion in 2024).

David Rubenstein and Pratheepan Gulasekam, writing for the Stanford Law Review Online in March 2019, depict the Trump administration as dramatically increasing privatized immigration detention "beyond its already inflated level". Already, most immigrants in the United States are detained in privately owned facilities, with the private detention industry being worth billions of dollars.

== Conditions ==
=== Government reports ===
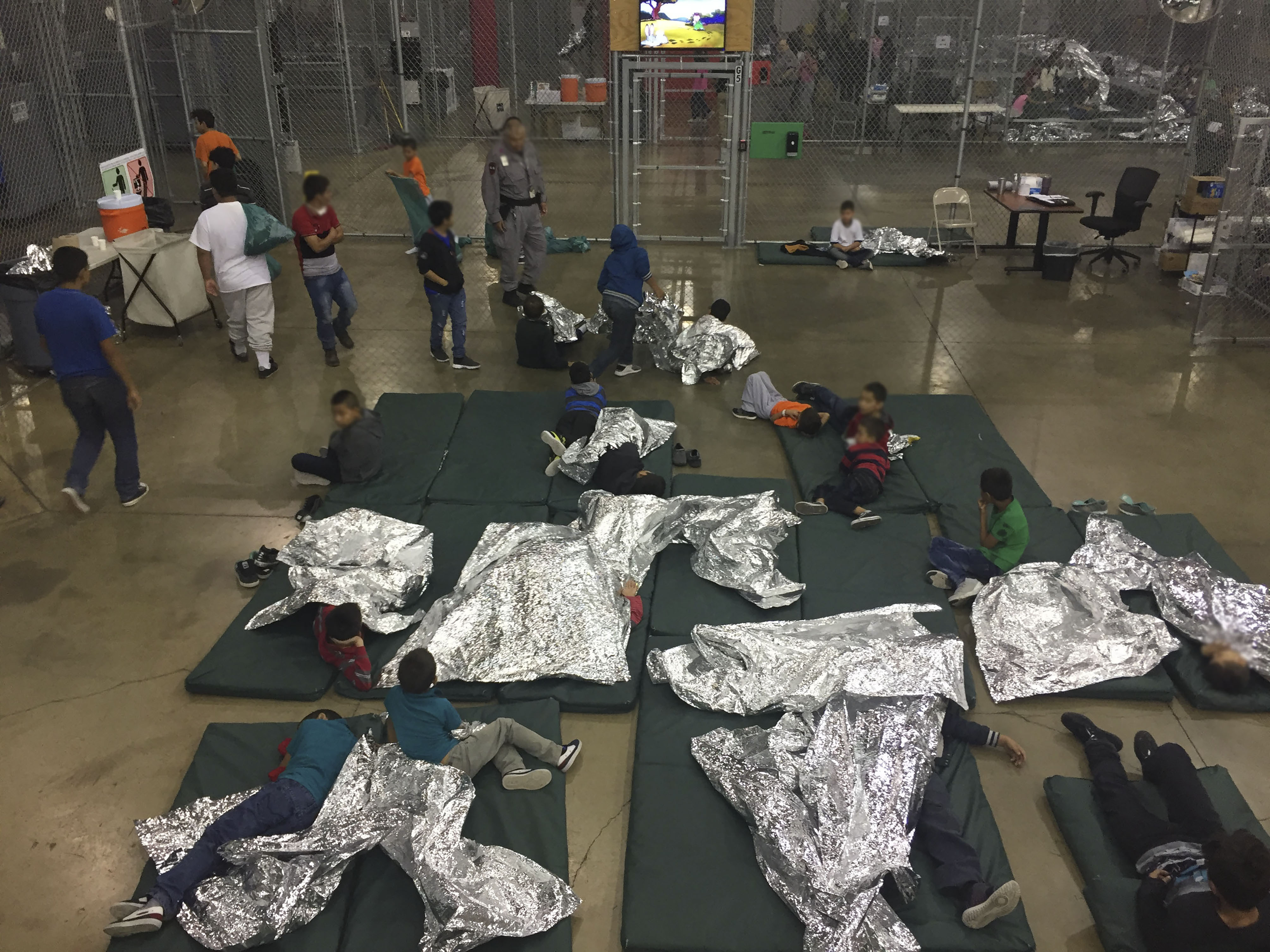
Photo provided in June 2018 by the U.S. Customs and Border Protection of the Ursula detention facility in McAllen, Texas, the United States.

The Department of Homeland Security Office of Inspector General carried out spot-checks of migrant detention centers from June 26 to 28, 2018. It published a report in September 2018, which was publicized in October 2018. It reported that CBP "in many instances" was violating federal guidelines by detaining migrant children for over 72 hours before passing them to the Health and Human Services' Office of Refugee Resettlement. Instead, the children were left for up to 25 days in facilities "not designed to hold people for long periods of time." At the facilities checked, 237 of 855 migrant children (28%) who were unaccompanied when entering the United States had been detained for periods of time over the federal limit. Furthermore, according to CBP data, during the period where the Trump administration zero tolerance policy was officially active (May 5, 2018 to June 20, 2018), there were 861 migrant children separated from their families from the Rio Grande Valley sector and the El Paso sector (around 40%) who had been detained for over 72 hours. The Office of Inspector General reported that this figure could be lower than the actual number because CBP used days of entry and exit for its time calculations, not specific hours.

The Office of Inspector General's September 2018 report additionally stated that despite the Trump administration's encouragement for migrants to enter the United States through ports of entry, the flow of crossing at the ports of entry were regulated to a slow rate. As a result, this created backlogs of people waiting at the ports of entry, and "likely resulted in additional illegal border crossings" according to the report.

Regarding the conditions that unaccompanied migrant children had been detained, the Department of Homeland Security Office of Inspector General released another report in September 2018 detailing that during their spot-checks from June 26 to 28, 2018, the facilities visited by them were in compliance with federal standards for food, water and hygiene, with "the exception of inconsistent cleanliness of the hold rooms". Although these were not mandatory, three of nine facilities visited had "trained medical staff", while four of nine facilities visited had shower facilities.

In May 2019, the Department of Homeland Security Office of Inspector General released a report finding "dangerous overcrowding" at the El Paso Del Norte Processing center, where up to 900 migrants had been detained. The official capacity of the center is 125. The report stated: "Border Patrol agents told us some of the detainees had been held in standing-room-only conditions for days or weeks", and with "limited access to showers and clean clothing, detainees were wearing soiled clothing for days or weeks". Many cells reportedly smelled of "what might have been unwashed bodies/body odour, urine, untreated diarrhea, and/or soiled clothing/diapers", while some detainees had to stand on the toilets in the cells "to make room and gain breathing space, thus limiting access to the toilets". 66% of detainees at the center during the May 7, 2019 inspection had been there for more than 72 hours.

Also in July 2019, the Office of Inspector General continued to find "dangerous overcrowding" at migrant detention facilities, after inspecting such facilities at Rio Grande Valley in June 2019. Some adults were housed in standing-room conditions for a week. The Office of Inspector General also reported "prolonged detention of children and adults". Of the roughly 8,000 migrants, there were around 3,400 (42%) being detained longer than the 72 hours CBP guideline for detention. With 2,669 children detained, 826 (31%) were detained longer than the 72 hours guideline. Some of the facilities also violated CBP standards by not granting children access to showers or hot meals. Due to overcrowding, CBP could not meet their standards of providing a shower for adults after 72 hours: "most single adults had not had a shower in CBP custody despite several being held for as long as a month". Additionally, "most single adults" were not given any change of clothing despite prolonged detention. Another violation of CBP standards occurred when "many single adults" were only fed bologna sandwiches for meals, resulting in some requiring medical assistance.

=== Visits to facilities ===
ProPublica recording of crying children separated from their families

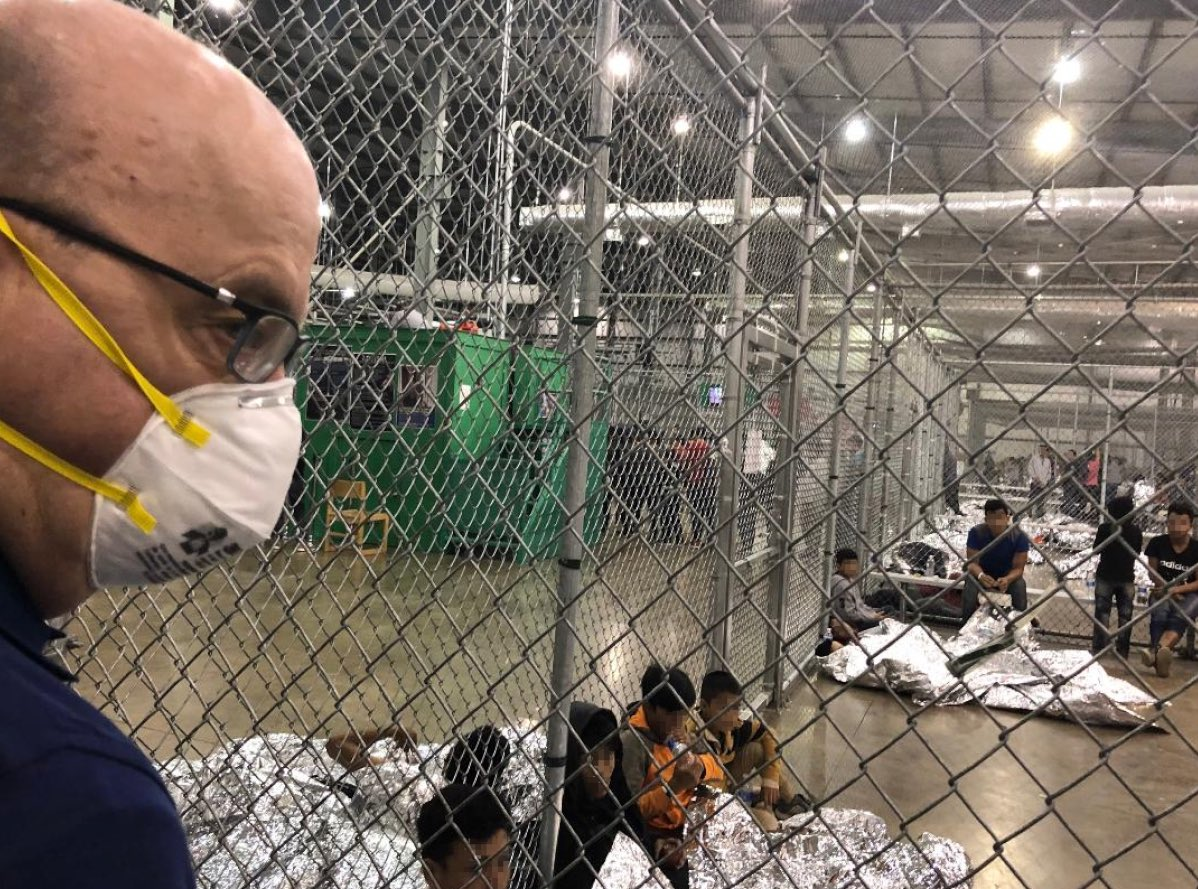
In July 2019, United States Representative Jim McGovern (left) visited migrants detained at the Ursula detention center in McAllen, Texas, the United States.

On June 17, 2018, human rights advocates and journalists toured an old warehouse where hundreds of children were being kept in wire cages. The Associated Press reported that the children had no books or toys, overhead lighting was kept on around the clock, and the children were sleeping under foil sheets. There was no adult supervision and the older children were caring for the toddlers. As part of those visiting the facility, a ProPublica reporter recorded the crying of some of the children that were being kept in one of the cages. On June 18, as reporters waited for a briefing by the Secretary of the Department of Homeland Security Kirstjen Nielsen, ProPublica posted the recording of crying children begging for their parents just after being separated from them, which the reporters listened to as they waited for her to speak. Nielsen arrived and spoke, blaming Congress for the administration's policy of separating parents from their children and saying that there would be no change in policy until Congress rewrote the nation's immigration laws. At one point during the briefing, a New York magazine reporter played the tape. Nielsen refused to answer any questions about the material in the tape, such as "How is this not child abuse?"

On June 22, 2018, First Lady Melania Trump visited a migrant detention facility for minors aged 12–17 in McAllen, Texas. She said that she "was very impressed with the center and the hardworking staff and leadership there", with the minors being "in good spirits". She called for Congress to pass "immigration reform that secures our borders and keeps families together". Trump drew media attention and speculation from the press because when she boarded the plane for Texas she wore a jacket with the graffiti-style wording "I really don't care Do U?" on the back of her jacket.

In July 2018, United States Representative Salud Carbajal, an immigrant himself, visited a migrant detention facility for migrant children in Tornillo, Texas. Carbajal said that a "basic level of care" was being provided, but it was still "basically violating their human rights", being woken at 5 a.m. each day, having less than 5 minutes to shower, and less than 10 to 15 minutes of recreation once or twice a day.

In June 2019, a legal team inspected (per the Flores settlement) a facility in Clint, Texas, (near El Paso) where 250 infant, child and teenage migrants were detained. The lawyers accused the government of neglecting and mistreating the young migrants. The relatively older minors had to take care of the younger ones. The children said they were not fed fruits or vegetables and had not bathed or changed their clothes in weeks. The children were "essentially being warehoused, as many as 300 children in a cell, with almost no adult supervision." The children were "malnourished", there were outbreaks of flu and lice, and "children sleeping on the floor". Professor Warren Binford of the Willamette University was one of the inspectors. She declared that in her years of inspections, this was "the worst conditions" she had ever seen. She also said that the children at Clint were claiming asylum. In response to the situation at Clint, Customs and Border Protection (CBP) declared: "our short-term holding facilities were not designed to hold vulnerable populations and we urgently need additional humanitarian funding to manage this crisis."

Also that month, Dolly Lucio Sevier, a board-certified doctor, visited the largest CBP detention center in the United States, the Ursula facility in McAllen, Texas which held migrant minors. Her visit came after a flu outbreak at the facility that resulted in five infants requiring to enter a neonatal intensive care unit. Sevier wrote that a medical declaration that the "conditions within which [the migrant minors] are held could be compared to torture facilities ... extreme cold temperatures, lights on 24 hours a day, no adequate access to medical care, basic sanitation, water, or adequate food." All of the 39 children she assessed showed signs of trauma.

Under federal law, the migrant minors were supposed to be detained for a maximum of 72 hours. At both the facilities in Clint and McAllen, many children said that they had been detained for three weeks or more.

On July 1, 2019, several Democratic congressmen visited migrant detention centers in Texas, in a tour organized by Border Patrol agents at 48 hours' notice, and gave comments afterwards. Representative Marc Veasey said Border Patrol "went out of their way to show us facilities that were mostly empty", but the migrant detainees inside "described being deprived of daily showers and certain other rights". Representative Madeleine Dean labelled the situation as "a human rights crisis": 15 "women in their 50s- 60s sleeping in a small concrete cell, no running water. Weeks without showers. All of them separated from their families". Representative Lori Trahan said she saw women "sobbing in a crowded cell because they were separated from their kids." Representatives Alexandria Ocasio-Cortez, Judy Chu and Joaquin Castro alleged that Border Patrol had told detained migrant women to drink out of a toilet for water. Castro also said that he had met between 15 and 20 mothers who had been detained for more than 50 days, some of whom had been separated from their children. Representative Joe Kennedy III said that Border Patrol had been uncooperative, attempting to confiscate the congressmen's phones, and blocking the taking of pictures and videos. Activists who had gathered at the facility chanted support for President Donald Trump and directed racist comments towards Representative Rashida Tlaib, a Muslim.

On July 12, 2019, a group of Republican congressmen visited a migrant detention centers in Texas along with Vice President Mike Pence. Senator Lindsey Graham was one of those who made the visit. Graham said that he saw 900 illegal immigrants in a facility meant for 385, resulting in an extra tent being put up. Graham elaborated that this was "not a concentration camp" but "a facility overwhelmed". He praised Border Patrol officers as "brave men and women who are doing an incredible job".

On July 13, 2019, another group of Democratic lawmakers visited migrant detention centers in McAllen, Texas, including a detention center that Vice President Pence had just visited the day before. Representative Jim McGovern tweeted that the migrants had not showered in 40 days, were sleeping on concrete with the lights on, and some migrants said they had not been given enough food. Representative Jackie Speier said that she saw parents with young children, "many of them listless, many were sick ... They had this kind of vacant look on their faces." Speier released photos of her tour; the Representatives had been allowed to bring their phones with them. Representative Annie Kuster said that she saw detained adult men "jammed into cells so that they couldn't even lay down". Kuster also stated some men "have not washed in 40 days, they have not brushed their teeth". Kuster described detained migrants having various illnesses: skin conditions, flu and meningitis. With the lights in the facility being always on, Kuster said that the migrants "don't know the difference between day or night".

=== Photos and videos ===
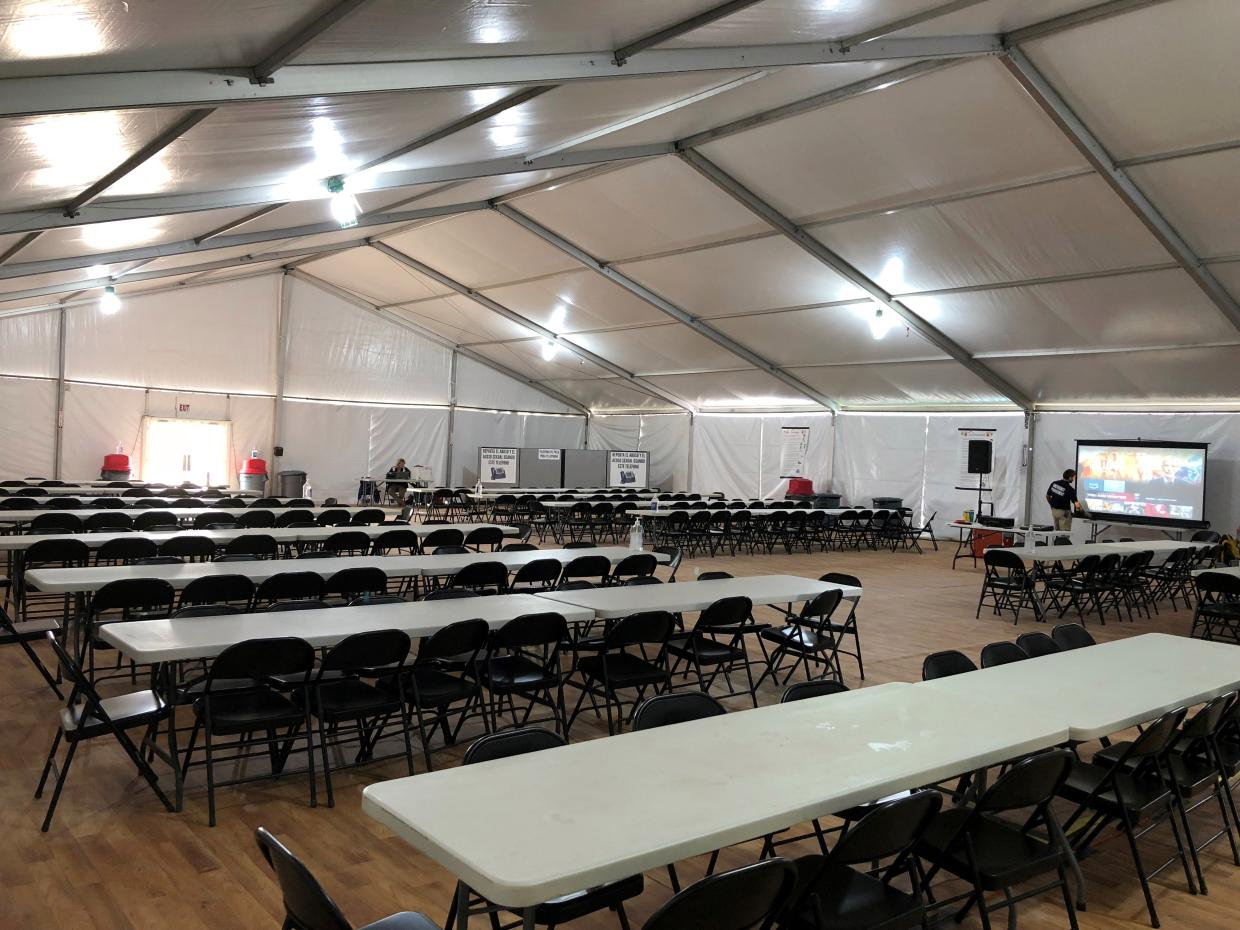
One of the photos provided in June 2018 by the U.S. Department of Health and Human Services of the Tornillo tent city in Texas, the United States. The photo was noted to be devoid of migrants.

In June 2018, U.S. Customs and Border Protection released photos of detained migrant children in a Texas immigration facility. Also that month, the U.S. Department of Health and Human Services released photos (that showed no migrants) of a tent city for teenage boys in Tornillo, Texas. Aerial photos taken by Reuters that month of the Tornillo tent city showed migrants walking in a line through the city.

In May 2019, Reuters took photos (from a helicopter) of makeshift camps for migrants by the Border Patrol in McAllen, Texas. The photos showed the migrants using reflective blankets as makeshift awnings for shade, migrants "sleeping in a shaded area of a parking lot and crowded around a military tent."

== Cases of American citizens detained ==
American citizens have been detained on suspicion of being illegal immigrants.

In March 2019, Customs and Border Protection detained an American brother-and-sister minors while they were travelling to school from Tijuana, Mexico, to San Ysidro, San Diego in the U.S. The 9-year old girl was detained for 32 hours while CBP were processing her identification. CBP accused the girl of having "provided inconsistent information during her inspection". According to the girl, CBP personnel said that she did not look like the person in her passport picture, and accused her of really being her cousin. According to their mother, officers threatened the 14-year old brother with charges of human trafficking and sex trafficking, and made him sign a document alleging that the girl was really his cousin. The boy said he did sign the document so that he could see his sister again. The Mexican consulate assisted in arranging the release of the siblings.

In June 2019, an 18-year old American male was detained after CBP stopped a group consisting of himself, his brothers and his friends at a checkpoint in Falfurrias, Texas. The teenager's family said that he had given CBP personnel his Texas state identification, a copy of his birth certificate, and his social security card, but that CBP had rejected all of them. As a result, the teenager was detained for 23 days. He said that he was kept together with 60 other people, had no access to showers, tooth brushing, beds, calls to his family or a calls to a lawyer. He also stated he lost 26 pounds as a result of the detention. The teenager's 17-year old brother, an illegal immigrant, was also detained, but voluntarily deported himself so that he could inform his family about the situation. The teenager is suing the government for the incident.

On 1 March 2025, The American Civil Liberties Union (ACLU) has filed a lawsuit to block the Trump administration's plan to transfer 10 migrants to Guantanamo Bay, citing poor detention conditions and human rights concerns. The migrants, who are from Venezuela, Bangladesh, Pakistan, and Afghanistan, are not deemed high-risk offenders. The lawsuit also disputes the ending of former President Biden's "parole" programs for migrants with U.S. sponsors.

== Reactions ==
=== The Trump administration ===
==== President Donald Trump ====
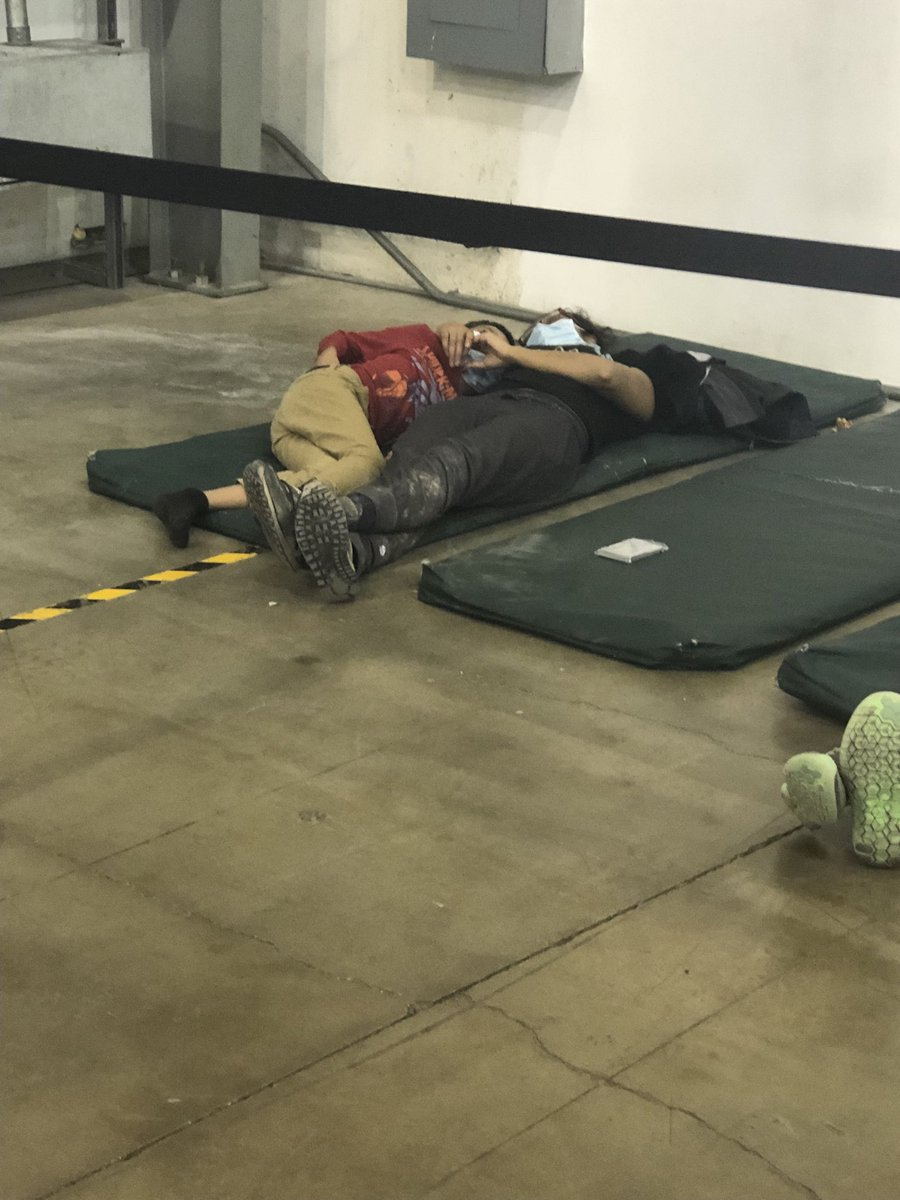
An adult and a child migrant lie on a floor mat in July 2019 at the Ursula detention facility in McAllen, Texas, the United States.

On July 3, 2019, President Donald Trump declared that U.S. Border Patrol was doing a "great job": "Many of these illegals [sic] aliens are living far better now than where they came from, and in far safer conditions ... If Illegal Immigrants are unhappy with the conditions in the quickly built or refitted detentions centers, just tell them not to come. All problems solved!"

On July 7, 2019, Trump said that detained migrants "are very happy with what's going on because, relatively speaking, they're in much better shape right now" than compared to the "unbelievable poverty" in their home countries.

On July 14, 2019, Trump wrote that a McAllen, Texas facility visited by Vice President Mike Pence had "adult single men areas were clean but crowded – also loaded up with a big percentage of criminals". Trump cited no evidence to back up his claim. Journalist Josh Dawsey of The Washington Post, who had visited the facility at the same time as Pence, responded to Trump that the detained men "hadn't showered in many days" and that the "stench was horrific".

==== Vice President Mike Pence ====
Vice President Mike Pence argued in June 2019 that while the Trump administration believes that while soap and toothbrushes should be provided for migrant children, "it's all a part of the appropriations process", and "Congress needs to provide additional support".

On July 12, 2019, Pence visited first a migrant detention facility for families and children in Donna, Texas, and second a migrant detention facility for single adults in McAllen, Texas. Pence described that at the Donna facility, "excellent care [was] being provided" to migrant families and children. At the McAllen facility, 384 adult men were caged together. The federal agent in charge of the facility said that many of the men had not bathed in 10 to 20 days, and that some of the men had been held for over 30 days. Agents at the facility wore face masks. A journalist on the same visit said that the "stench was overwhelming". Pence reacted: "I was not surprised by what I saw ... This is tough stuff." Pence later criticized media outlet CNN for focusing on the worse conditions at the McAllen facility, compared to the better conditions of the Donna facility. Pence also said that "allegations of heartless mistreatment by Customs and Border Protection" were false and "slanderous". Pence also accused "many" of the men in the McAllen facility as having multiple arrests.

==== Attorney General Jeff Sessions ====
In May 2018, Attorney General Jeff Sessions declared: "If you don't want your child separated, then don't bring them across the border illegally." On June 5, 2018, Sessions claimed that detained migrant children "are being well taken care of". He also stated that these children would be passed over from detention to Health and Human Services "within 72 hours". On June 21, 2018, Sessions claimed that the Trump administration "never really intended to" separate families while the parents are detained, despite that being an effect Sessions previously acknowledged would occur when the Trump administration's zero tolerance policy was implemented.

==== Other officials ====
Matthew Albence, a senior official at Immigration and Customs Enforcement, testified to Congress in July 2018 that migrant detention centers for families were like "summer camp": "24/7 food and water ... educational opportunities ... recreational opportunities ... exercise classes".

Kevin McAleenan, the Commissioner of U.S. Customs and Border Protection, said in March 2019 that there was a "border security and a humanitarian crisis" at the Mexico-U.S. border. By July 2019, McAleenan had become the Acting Homeland Security Secretary. He said that funding provided by Congress in June 2019 "meets immediate acute needs at the border and has already improved conditions for children".

=== International reactions ===
Experts of the United Nations' Human Rights Council in June 2018 criticized that the Trump administration was detaining child migrants "as a deterrent to irregular migration", stating that detaining children "severely hampers their development, and in some cases may amount to torture".

Prime Minister of the United Kingdom, Theresa May, said in June 2018 that regarding the detention of migrants in the United States, "pictures of children being held in what appear to be cages are deeply disturbing", and that the United Kingdom disagreed with such actions.

The United Nations' High Commissioner for Human Rights, Michelle Bachelet, was in July 2019 "deeply shocked" at the conditions that the migrant children were reported to have been subjected to, with concerns about overcrowding, food, sleep, hygiene and healthcare.

On 9 November 2020, the United States faced a review at the UN's Human Rights Council session of 3.5 hours, citing the unexplained detentions of migrant children and the killings of unarmed Black people, during the Trump administration's tenure, among other main issues. Iran, Syria, Venezuela, Russia and China were among the countries that questioned and scrutinised the United States' record on human rights.

=== Academic sources ===
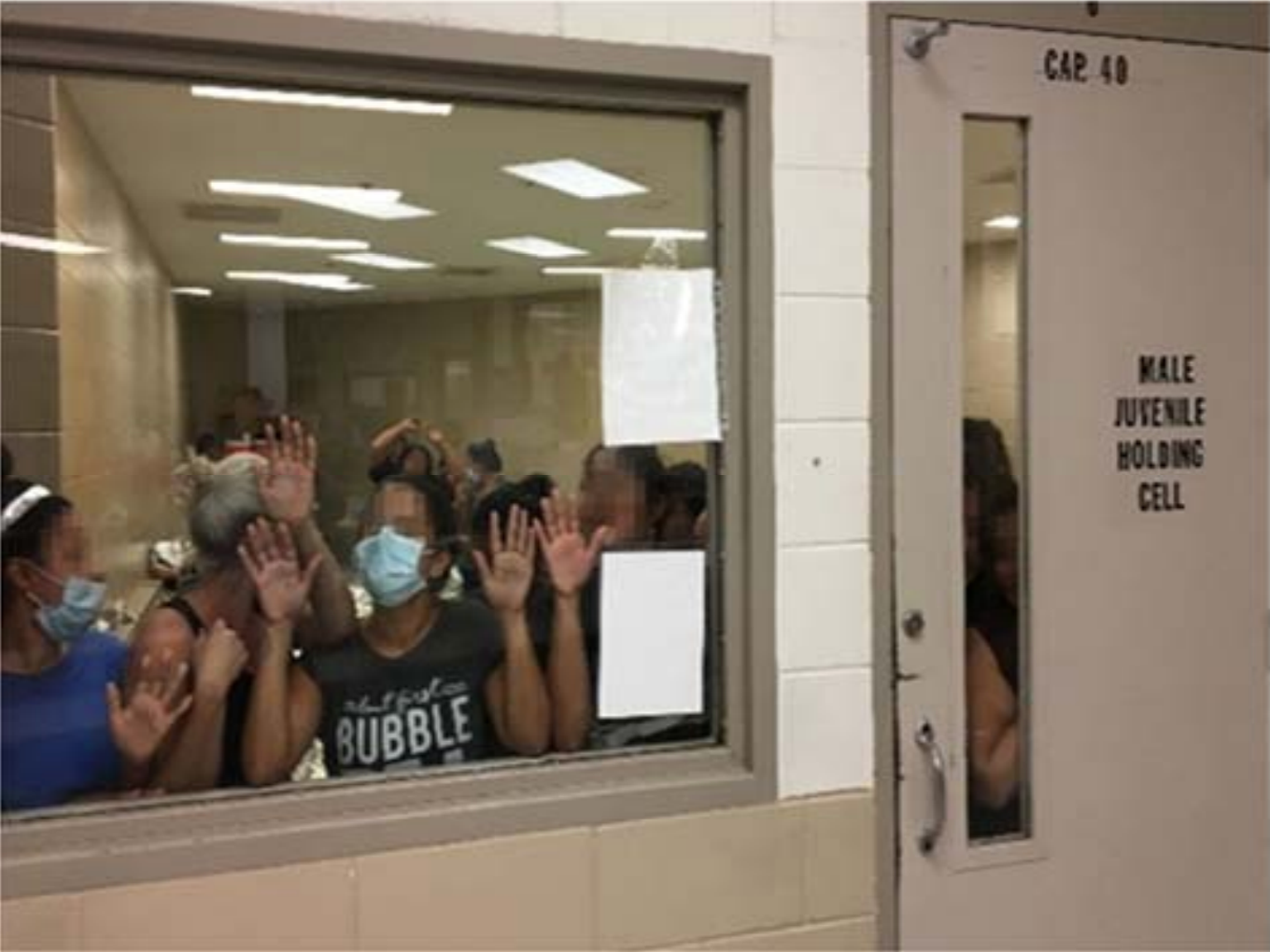
At the Border Patrol's Fort Brown station in June 2019, there were 51 adult females held in a cell with a capacity of 40 male minors.

Mary Grace Antonym, writing for the Journal of Ethnic and Migration Studies, interviewed former volunteers at migrant family detention centers and analysed news reports from July 2017 to August 2017. Antonym concluded that "moral disengagement" had a key role "rationalising detention", with detained migrants being ultimately perceived as "little more than monetary units". During the study, Antonym also noted that the Trump administration was attempting to increase total migrant detention facility capacity to 80,000.

Mónica Verea, writing for Norteamérica in December 2018, stated that the Trump administration had "considerably" increased the numbers of "non-criminal undocumented migrants" detained.

Han Seunghan and Choi Hyunkyung wrote in 2018 for a Research Association for Interdisciplinary Studies conference that detentions and family separations are "traumatizing events" for child and young adult migrants, which may cause them to have posttraumatic stress disorder (PTSD).

Susan Schmidt, writing for Social Work in January 2019, stated that the Trump administration's treatment of migrant children at the Mexico-U.S. border violated the standards for American children passed by Congress and Trump in the Family First Prevention Services Act of February 2018. Schmidt argued that the Trump administration's lack of priority in reunifying child migrants with their parents resulted in more "trauma" being inflicted.

David Hernández, writing for NACLA Report on the Americas, wrote in May 2019 that "migrant detention is a punitive incarceration system rife with lawful forms of corruption." Detention corporations engage in unregistered lobbying, including through the American Legislative Exchange Council. They have also donated to Trump's inauguration fund, hired a former leader of the Trump inauguration committee, and moved their annual conference from their own facility to a Trump resort.

Kevin Johnson and Rose Cuison-Villazor wrote for Wake Forest Law Review in May 2019 that the President Trump's changing policies on migrant detention "struggled to establish a policy that goes to the legal limits". The administration's tough approach to immigration with mandatory detention ignored that "the vast majority" of families putting bonds to be released while waiting for hearings eventually did return to attend their hearings. Johnson and Cuison-Villazor argue that the Trump administration had alternatives to mandatory detentions, with the possibility of "catch and release" for non-flight risks and non-dangerous migrants, or even ankle bracelets for tracking.

Emily Ryo, in 2019's Annual Review of Law and Social Science, credited the "media storm" over 2018's Trump administration family separation policy resulted in "unprecedented public awareness about immigration detention" in the United States.

==== "Concentration camp" label ====
Historian Waitman Wade Beorn declared in The Washington Post in June 2018 that the detention centers for migrant children were concentration camps. Beorn specializes in Holocaust and genocide studies, according to the Post, and he is the author of Marching into Darkness, a history of the German army's role in the Holocaust. Beorn wrote that the best historical comparison for these detention centers was the Camp de Rivesaltes, a French concentration camp operated from 1939 through 1967, and then from 1985 to 2007. At various points in time, the camp hosted Spanish refugees, Jewish refugees, prisoners-of-war, Algerians, and other migrants. To explain this comparison, Beorn stated that the Camp de Rivesaltes was "a temporary, insufficiently conceived facility designed to prevent foreigners from entering the country", and "officials have no real plan" with how to handle the migrants, just like the American detention centers.

As reported by Newsweek in June 2019, several other academics also labelled the migrant detention centers as concentration camps. These include American studies professor Rachel Ida Buff of the University of Wisconsin-Milwaukee, sociology professor Richard Lachmann of the University at Albany, and also Amy Simon, the Michigan State University chair in Holocaust Studies and European Jewish History. A different view was proposed by history professor Jay Geller of the Case Western Reserve University, who instead labelled the migrant detention centers as internment camps. Meanwhile, history professor Anika Walke of the Washington University in St. Louis rejected the notion that the term of "concentration camp" can only be restricted to the case of Nazi concentration camps.

=== Industry response ===
==== Wayfair ====
In mid-June 2019, Wayfair employees learned that an order for about $200,000 (~$241,354 in 2024) worth of bedroom furniture was placed by the global nonprofit BCFS Health and Human Services, which operates migrant facilities for the Department of Health and Human Services. In a letter sent to senior management on June 21, 2019, more than 500 Wayfair employees demanded that the company "cease to do business with BCFS and establish a code of ethics that empowers employees 'to act in accordance with our core values'". In further protest, employees staged a walkout on June 26, 2019 at the company's headquarters in Boston. The protesters called for the company to donate all profits made from the sale of the furniture to RAICES, a nonprofit organization that provides free legal services to immigrants. Those profits total $86,000, according to the Twitter account wayfairwalkout.

The protest received praise from American congresswomen Alexandria Ocasio-Cortez, who described the walkout as "what solidarity looks like".

Niraj Shah, the CEO of Wayfair, generated additional controversy after he rejected the demands and donated to the Red Cross, which does not provide support to migrants detained at the border.

==== Airlines ====
In June 2018, US airlines spoke out against the Trump administration's "zero tolerance" immigration policy that resulted in the separation of migrant children from their families. American Airlines, United Airlines and Frontier Airlines all asked the federal government not to use their planes to transport migrant children after they are taken from their parents.

==== Walmart ====
In June 2018, Walmart also became embroiled when one of its former Brownsville, Texas, locations was turned into a shelter last year. "We're really disturbed by how our former store is being used", the company said. "When we sold the building in 2016 we had no idea it'd be used for this."

== See also ==
- March 2025 Venezuelan deportations – United States deportation of Venezuelans
