= Center on Race and Social Problems =

Coordinates: 40.444167°N 79.953056°W

The Center on Race and Social Problems (CRSP) at the University of Pittsburgh School of Social Work was designed to address societal problems through research, intervention, and education. It is the first center of its kind to be housed in a school of social work and it is unique in both its multidisciplinary approach and its multiracial focus. The mission of CRSP is to conduct solution-oriented social science research on race, ethnicity, and color and their influence on the quality of life for Americans in the 21st century. CRSP has identified seven major areas of race-related social problems: economic disparities; educational disparities; interracial group relations; mental health practices and outcomes; youth, families, and the elderly; criminal justice; and health.

In 2002, the School of Social Work at the University of Pittsburgh established the Center on Race and Social Problems (CRSP) to help lead America further along the path to social justice by conducting race-related research, mentoring emerging scholars, and disseminating race-related research findings and scholarship. Today, CRSP is one of the most productive and exciting centers in the country. In 2010, it hosted the largest conference on race ever held in America. In addition, the center offers a speaker series, summer institutes, and an online directory; publishes demographics reports and the journal Race and Social Problems; and much more.

== The Directory ==
The CRSP website is now both a traditional source of information on Center activities and a searchable database. The searchable database (Directory) has been created so that users can easily find and access all of the videos, publications, and other information produced by the Center during its history.

The Directory presently contains:

- Information on all seven areas of focus for the Center
- Listings of all center activities
- 150 videos of lectures from the lecture series, summer institutes, and the Race in America conference
- Pilot studies and other research projects at the Center
- 200 publications
- Education, including study abroad course in Cuba, other graduate courses on race/ethnicity, and student paper awards

== Speaker Series ==
During the academic year, the center hosts a monthly series of lunchtime lectures featuring experts from across the nation addressing issues of race. These talks provide an opportunity for faculty, students, and community members to engage in race-related discussions on sometimes highly charged subjects. The series, which has been sponsored for over seven years by Pittsburgh law firms Buchanan Ingersoll & Rooney PC and Reed Smith LLC, has included topics such as depression in African Americans, the racial views of teenagers, housing and workplace discrimination, the racial gap in education and how neighborhood culture affects racial inequality. CRSP makes videos of all of the lectures available to the community.

== Summer Institutes ==
The Center on Race and Social Problems hosts one-day institutes in the summer. Each institute has examined different racial issues, including racial disparities for Black males in the areas of gun violence, employment, health and mental health, and education. The center also has examined other disparity issues, including African American parental involvement in education, diversity in corporate America, and African American children’s mental health The institutes examine explanations, consequences, model programs, and new policy and program options. The summer institutes feature presentations and discussions with national and local experts and are intended for researchers, educators, administrators, community leaders, policymakers, and practitioners.

== Race and Social Problems Journal ==
The center's journal, Race and Social Problems, first appeared in early 2009. The journal provides a multidisciplinary and international forum for the publication of articles and discussion of issues germane to race and its enduring relationship to psychological, socioeconomic, political, and cultural problems. It publishes original empirical articles that use a variety of methodologies, including qualitative and quantitative (descriptive, relationship testing, and intervention studies), and papers using secondary data sources. it also publishes nonempirical articles, including reviews of past research, theoretical studies, policy proposals, critical analyses, historical reviews and analyses, and solution-based papers on critical contemporary issues.

== Race, Ethnicity and Poverty (REAP) ==
More than 30 researchers and center directors from across the country gathered at the University of Pittsburgh Center on Race and Social Problems (CRSP) in June 2013 for the first-of-its-kind summit of Race, Ethnicity, and Poverty (REAP) centers. The summit aimed to identify and locate existing REAP centers and determine what these centers do and how they function as research entities as well as to create opportunities for future collaboration among centers.

The summit identified 70 REAP centers throughout the United States, 90 percent of which are affiliated with a college or university. While many centers work in several different areas, some were identified by a main area of population focus:

- Twenty-six centers were identified as focusing primarily on African Americans.
- Seven centers were identified as focusing primarily on Hispanics.
- Three centers were identified as focusing primarily on Asian Americans.
- Five centers were identified as focusing primarily on Native Americans.

A second REAP summit to continue the collaborative network established at the 2013 event is being planned for Summer 2014.

== The "Race in America: Restructuring Inequality" Conference ==
The "Race in America: Restructuring Inequality" conference, hosted by CRSP in June 2010, was one of the largest and most comprehensive national conferences on the topic of race ever held in America. The University of Pittsburgh School of Social Work created the Center on Race and Social Problems to confront what W.E.B. Du Bois, in his 1903 book The Souls of Black Folk, described as “the problem of the twentieth century … the color line," and the Race in America conference was held to bring social work to the front and center of the problem of racism. For three days, more than 40 internationally recognized experts from across the country met to discuss racism and the way it touches all aspects of society. Julian Bond, chairman emeritus of the NAACP, delivered the keynote address, "The Road to Freedom: from Alabama to Obama." The conference was attended by more than 1,200 people.

The conference resulted in seven reports and over 60 hours of video on the topics education, economics, criminal justice, race relations, health, mental health, and families, youth, and the elderly.
