= Race and Social Problems =

Peer-reviewed academic journal

- Discipline: Sociology, ethnic studies
- Language: English
- Edited by: Gary F. Koeske

Publication details
- History: 2009–present
- Publisher: Springer Science+Business Media on behalf of the Center on Race and Social Problems
- Frequency: Quarterly
- Impact factor: 1.104 (2017)

Standard abbreviations
- ISO 4: Race Soc. Probl.

Indexing
- ISSN: 1867-1748 (print); 1867-1756 (web)
- LCCN: 2010205659
- OCLC no.: 550631421

Links
- Journal homepage; Online archive

Race and Social Problems is a quarterly peer-reviewed academic journal covering the sociology of race and ethnicity. It was established in 2009 and is published by Springer Science+Business Media. It is the official journal of the Center on Race and Social Problems at the University of Pittsburgh. The editor-in-chief is Gary F. Koeske (University of Pittsburgh School of Social Work). According to the Journal Citation Reports, the journal has a 2017 impact factor of 1.104.
