= Tornillo tent city =

Temporary detention center for immigrant minors

Coordinates: 31°26′07″N 106°08′32″W

The Tornillo tent city was a temporary immigrant detention facility for children located in Tornillo, Texas and operated by BCFS on behalf of the Department of Health and Human Services' Office of Refugee Resettlement. The department termed it an "emergency influx care facility" and named it the Tornillo Influx Facility. When it was built in June 2018, the capacity was 400 minor immigrants with a one-month contract. It was later expanded to a capacity of 4,000 minors. As many as 2,800 teenagers were held at the site before its closure was announced in January 2019. This made it one of the largest facilities in ORR's Unaccompanied Alien Children Program. All immigrant children had left the facility by January 11, 2019. Nearly 6,200 minors cycled through the facility within the seven months it operated. The area was previously used for a few months in 2016 to process migrant families and unaccompanied minors.

== About ==
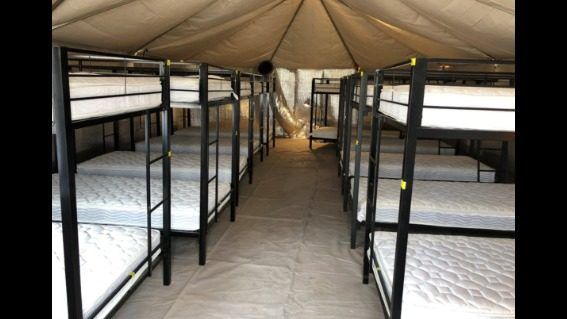
Bunk beds inside the tents

The tent city in Tornillo, Texas was created in order to "house the overflow of immigrant children, many of whom have been separated from their parents," according to NBC News. It was run by the Administration for Children and Families which is a division of the United States Department of Health and Human Services. The tent city was meant to be a temporary shelter and was the first one constructed to house children who have been separated from their families under Trump's "zero tolerance policy" for families entering the United States illegally. United States Representative, Will Hurd, said that "he was told that only teenage boys were at the facility -- and that they were children who had entered the country by themselves." However, U.S. Representative Beto O'Rourke said that children who were separated from their families were also housed in the tent city. It is unclear whether the minors housed in the tent city were separated from their families or had been apprehended without adults present.

The shelter was located near the Tornillo Land Port of Entry on the border of Texas and Mexico. It was designed to start taking in 360 children, with further plans for expansion. The entire facility was built within 24 hours of the federal government confirming the location of the shelter. The location was confirmed on June 14, 2018, and by the next day, 100 children were already located on site. The shelter had the capacity for 4,000 children. The shelter apparently doubled in size from June 18 to June 19, according to aerial photographs taken by Reuters.

Tents housing the children were air-conditioned, according to a spokesperson from DHS. The tents could hold up to 20 children and 2 adults at a time. The tents had bunk beds. There was no shade in the area surrounding the tents. The tent city facility also had showers, toilets, medical facilities, meeting spaces and fire trucks. It was fenced in with chain link fencing topped with barbed wire. There is one adult for every ten children and minors receive three meals a day and snacks. It has been estimated by DHS that it costs $775 per migrant child per night to house them inside the tent city.

On June 21, 2018, mayors from the U.S. Conference of Mayors and politicians from across the United States were denied entry to the tent city. Hurd was able to tour the facility on June 15.

== Operations ==
Operations were contracted to BCFS Health and Human Services, a San Antonio faith-based nonprofit. Costs were estimated to be between $750-$1,200 for each minor per night. As of November 2018, the 2,100 staffers had not passed FBI fingerprint background checks, a requirement waived by Scott Lloyd, now former director of HHS's Office of Refugee Resettlement.

BCFS has operated facilities for unaccompanied migrant minors in multiple states since the Obama administration.

== Criticism ==
Texas State Senator José R. Rodríguez called housing children in the shelters "totally inhumane and it is outrageous." The area was currently experiencing 100 to 105 degrees Fahrenheit weather. Texas State Representative César Blanco said that housing immigrant children in tents was "dehumanizing and tarnishes Texas' tradition of welcoming immigrants."

United States Representative Beto O'Rourke led hundreds on a protest march to the site of the tent city on June 17, 2018.

US Representatives Rosa DeLauro (of Connecticut) and Lucille Roybal-Allard (California) called for the closure of the camp in a December 3, 2018 letter to HHS Secretary Alex Azar. In the letter, they stated, "The administration is using this facility, which is on federal land and unregulated by State child welfare authorities, to evade requirements and standards for the care of children."

== Closure ==
According to Kevin Dinnin, president of BCFS, the camp closure initiated after the contractor refused to continue expanding operations. The day after the refusal, Department of Health and Human Services announced that the strict background requirement for sponsor households would be reversed, expediting the rate of sponsorship placements. It was announced that all detained children had been sponsored or transferred to other shelters on January 11, 2019.
