= University of Pittsburgh School of Social Work =

Social work school

Coordinates: 40.444167°N 79.953056°W

- Former names: Division of Social Work (1918–1922); Division of Social Work in the Department of Sociology (1931–1938); School of Applied Social Sciences (1938–1947); School of Social Work (1947–1957); Graduate School of Social Work (1957–1971)
- Type: Public
- Established: 1918
- Dean: Kyaien O. Conner
- Faculty: 30
- Undergraduates: 700
- Postgraduates: 500
- Location: Pittsburgh, Pennsylvania, USA
- Campus: Oakland (Main)

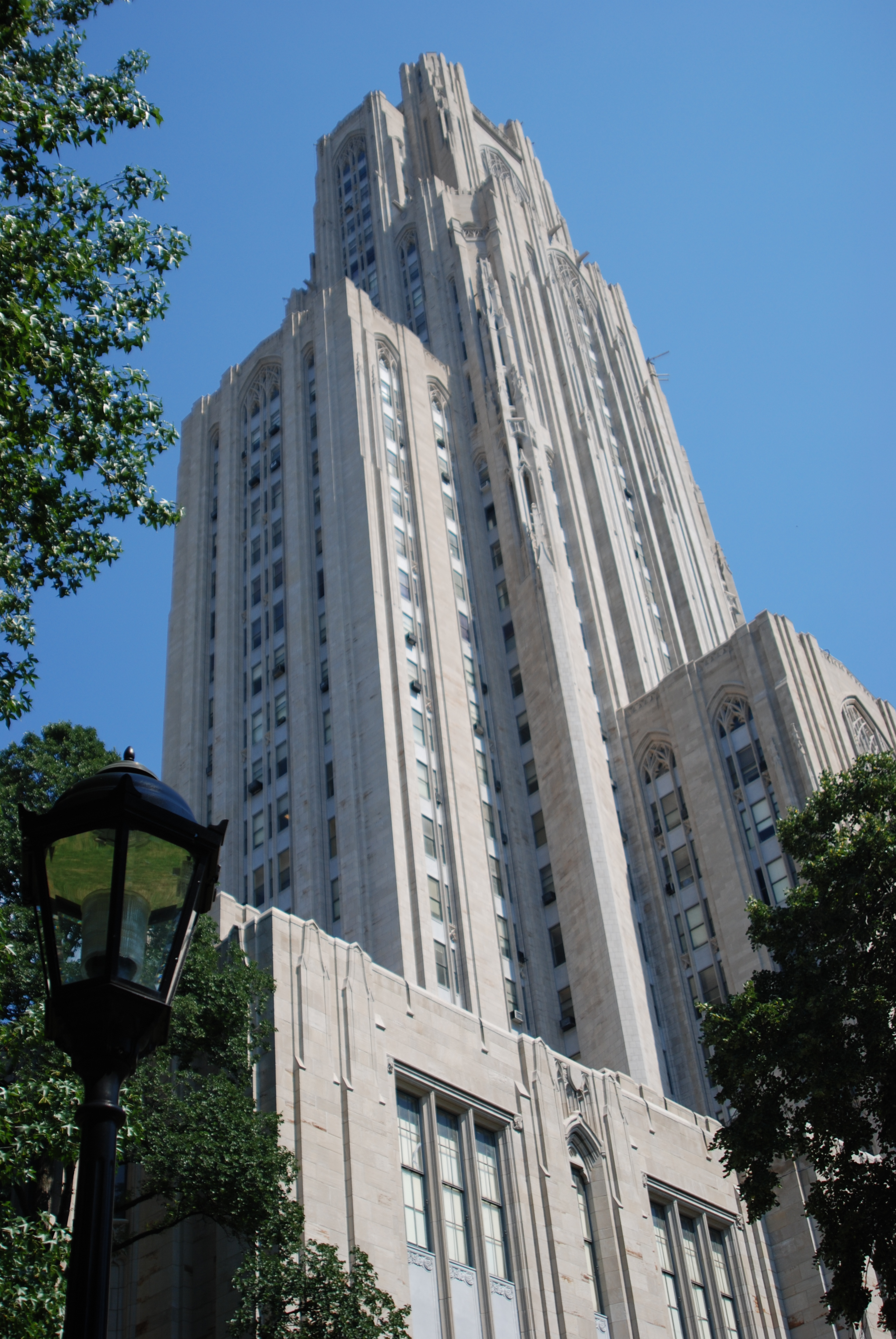
The School of Social Work is headquartered on the 20th through 23rd floors of the Cathedral of Learning

The University of Pittsburgh School of Social Work is the social work school of the University of Pittsburgh. Established in 1918, it is located in the Oakland section of Pittsburgh, Pennsylvania.

The school also administers the statewide Child Welfare Education and Research Programs from the Oakland Campus and the Child Welfare Resource Center for the Commonwealth of Pennsylvania in Mechanicsburg, Pennsylvania.

== History ==
The School of Social Work at the University of Pittsburgh was founded in 1918 as a division of the School of Economics' Department of Sociology. In the early stages, coursework was offered to a cohort of students for one year before the program was officially accredited in 1919 by the American Association of Schools of Professional Social Work (AASPSW), a predecessor to the Council on Social Work Education. Early curricular emphases were child welfare, mental health, and community building. Seventeen faculty offered 19 courses. In 1922, the university withdrew from the AASPSW, and the formal social work program was disbanded, though courses continued.

In 1928, course listings in social work reappeared. In 1931, the Division of Social Work was created as a separate unit within the Department of Sociology. Students in that era earned a Master of Arts in Social Work. Also in 1931, the Division of Social Work established an Agency Advisory Committee, an Agency Advisory Committee for Group Work, an Agency Advisory Committee for Medical Social Work, and an Agency Advisory Committee for Policy Studies. In 1932, the university began the process of having its accreditation reinstated by the AASPSW, a request made formally in January 1933. In July 1933, Marion Hathway was recruited by Elmer from the University of Chicago as an assistant professor. Hathway's responsibilities were to direct the social work program, obtain accreditation for the program and to build toward the establishment of a School of Social Work separate from the Department of Sociology.

The AASPSW granted full accreditation to the program in 1934, which had an enrollment of 252 students. In 1938, the University of Pittsburgh created the School of Applied Social Sciences as the university's 18th separate school. Wilbur I. Newstetter became the new school's first dean in 1938 and served until 1962. Historically, the social work program has had several designations: Division of Social Work (1918–1922); Division of Social Work in the Department of Sociology (1931–1938); School of Applied Social Sciences (1938–1947); School of Social Work (1947–1957); Graduate School of Social Work (1957–1971); and the School of Social Work (1971 to the present). For the remainder of this article, the social work program will be referred to as "the School."

During the 1930s and 1940s, the school's curriculum embraced the traditional social casework course of studies, but began immediately to create curriculum, deliver papers in such forums as the National Council of Social Work and publish articles and text books in social group work and community organization (initially called "intergroup work") by Dean W. I. Newstetter, a major contributor to the formation of this field of specialization in social work.

Also during the 1940s, Dr. Hathway spearheaded the creation of a doctoral program, secured University approval and became the program's first director in 1945.

During the 1950s and 1960s, the school continued to expand enrollment, develop the major curricular emphases of the Master of Social Work (MSW) program (social casework, social group work and community organization), and build the doctoral program which became a Doctor of Philosophy (Ph.D.) program. Heavy emphasis in the master's program was given to child welfare, medical social work, mental health and school social work. In addition, an MSW major in research was added and a variety of joint degree programs were established. At the MSW level, these included one of the oldest joint Master of Social Work/Master of Divinity degree programs in the nation; Master of Social Work/ Master of Jewish Communal Services; Master of Social Work/Master of Public Administration; Master of Social Work/Master of Public Health; and Master of Social Work/Juris Doctor. In addition, a joint Master of Public Health and Doctor of Philosophy was implemented.

The 1970s was another period of rapid growth in enrollment and major curricular developments. In 1973, the school abandoned the traditional social casework, social group work, community organization framework and adopted an integrated academic paradigm. This new design identified four major areas (concentrations) of study: Children, Youth and Families; Health and Mental Health; Poverty and Associated Problems; and Juvenile and Criminal Justice. Within each of these, students also selected a specialization from among Interpersonal Skills; Organization and Planning; Administration and Policy; and Research.

In 1969, a commission chaired by University of Pittsburgh Professor Erma Myerson and financed by The Heinz Endowments of Pittsburgh completed a study of the future of undergraduate social work education for the Council on Social Work. The report of this commission paved the way for accredited undergraduate social work education. In 1973, the University of Pittsburgh launched its own bachelor's program in social work.

In 2001, a major investment was made in the development of a university Center on Race and Social Problems in the school. This center was created to foster multidisciplinary research on race related social issues, mentor scholars whose research focuses on race as a defining social problem in America, and to disseminate race related knowledge. The center focuses on race related social problems in criminal justice, economic disparities, educational disparities, health, interracial group relations, mental health, and youth families and the elderly. As parts of its work, the center publishes the professional Journal Race and Social Problems.

== Academic programs ==
=== Bachelor of Arts in Social Work (BASW) ===
The BASW Program includes a liberal arts base and prepares students for entry-level generalist social work and for graduate education. The program aims to provide students with the skills needed to engage in culturally competent practice with diverse populations; promotes critical analysis of environmental factors affecting individuals, families, and communities; and promote advocacy for those who confront institutional barriers in order to prepare students for service and leadership.

=== Master of Social Work Program (MSW) ===
The University of Pittsburgh’s Master of Social Work (MSW) degree offers students the opportunity to become transformative change makers by elevating their knowledge and honing their skill set to become licensed clinicians, community and system leaders, entrepreneurs, policymakers, researchers, and more.

The program offers a face-to-face option and a part-time online option.

Specializations include Direct Practice with Individuals, Families, and Small Groups (Direct Practice) and Community, Organization, and Social Action (COSA). Areas of focus and certificate opportunities include: Integrated Health; Children, Youth, and Families; Gerontology; Home and School Visitor/School Social Worker; Human Services Management; Mental Health; and Community Organizing and Practice.

=== Doctoral Program ===
The social work doctoral program awarded its first degrees in 1949 and prepares students for careers in academic research, teaching, or social policy planning and administration.

=== Joint Degree Programs ===
The school offers the following joint/dual degrees: Master of Social Work/Master of Business Administration (MBA); Master of Social Work/Master of Divinity; Master of Social Work/Master of Public Administration; Master of Social Work/Master of Public and International Affairs; Master of Social Work/Master of International Development; Master of Social Work/Doctor of Philosophy (PhD) in Social Work; Master of Social Work/Master of Public Health; Master of Social Work/Juris Doctor; Master of Social Work with a Certificate in Secondary Education (MSW/CAST); and PhD/Master of Public Health (MPH).

== Alumni ==
Hundreds of the school's alumni have attained major leadership careers as public officials; deans, directors, chancellors and presidents in higher education and social work education; researchers and faculty; and executives of social service agencies, foundations and professional organizations; and a wide range of administrative and leadership positions in industry, commerce, the military, and government.

== Leadership ==
In 2026, Kyaien O. Conner was named Dean, the first Black woman to hold the position. In 2018, Elizabeth M.Z. Farmer was named Dean, the first woman to hold the position. Previous deans include Larry E. Davis and David Epperson.

== Rankings and reputation ==
As of 2024, it is ranked tied for 12th out of 319 schools for social work in the United States by U.S. News & World Report.

== See also ==
List of social work schools
