= BCFS Health and Human Services =

Non-profit organization based in San Antonio, Texas

- Founded: San Antonio, U.S.
- Type: Non-profit
- Location: Americas, international headquarters in San Antonio
- Services: Foster care, adoption, emergency shelter, and major federal contractor for migrant youth shelter
- Key people: Todd Snyder (President)
- Website: discoverbcfs.net

BCFS Health and Human Services (formerly Baptist Child and Family Services) is a U.S. 501(c)(3) organization based in San Antonio, Texas, specializing in emergency shelter, foster care, and adoption. It was founded as an orphanage for Hispanic children in 1944.

== Projects ==
=== Youth outreach ===
In 2000, BCFS was a partner with Texas Youth Commission and Bexar County Juvenile Probation in establishing the first transition center in Texas for youth aging out of foster care with a grant from United States Department of Labor. Former Major League Baseball pitcher Jimmy Morris was hired as a motivational speaker in 2015, saying "It's my job to tell the kids what they're capable of... It's not about me. It's about what God can do through me." BCFS operates Guadalupe Street Coffee and Westside Community Center in San Antonio as a service to area youth and their families in partnership with city agencies, non-profits, and faith-based organizations.

A San Antonio BCFS office focuses on supporting victims of human trafficking that works in coalition with San Antonio Police Department, ChildSafe, and other organizations. A 2023 panel discussion run by BCFS highlighted the particular vulnerabilities for youth in the foster care system.

In 2025, BCFS announced that their Youth Averted from Delinquency program that works with juvenile courts to reduce recidivism would expand to Gillespie County. BCFS also provided free counseling to youth affected by July 2025 Central Texas floods.

=== Emergency shelters ===
BCFS coordinated shelter for the 462 children displaced from YFZ Ranch in 2008. Affiliate Baptist Children’s Home Youth Ranch was adapted to support keeping large amounts of siblings together.

In response to Hurricane Ida mandatory evacuation orders in Louisiana, BCFS operated shelters that implemented software from Texas Health Services Authority's partner Audacious Inquiry to coordinate medical information and histories for displaced patients.

=== Minor detention centers ===
BCFS first started administrating shelters for unaccompanied migrant children under George W. Bush's administration. By 2014, BCFS ran two large temporary detention centers and six permanent shelters. In 2015, BCFS received more funding than any other Office of Refugee Resettlement contractor and nearly a quarter of total funding designated for the unaccompanied minors program.

In 2017, a 10 year-old girl with cerebral palsy was arrested after traveling in an ambulance unaccompanied for a gall bladder operation. Representative Joaquin Castro attempted to visit her at BCFS shelter and was refused access while her deportation status was being determined. District judge Fred Biery suggested that her mother should have been detained as well. The child was released without deportation following objections from the ACLU.

BCFS operated Tornillo tent city, the largest detention camp for minors at the time, from June 2018–January 2019. In December 2018 it is estimated that the camp held more than 2,800 minors, mostly from Central America, and employed 2,000 people. CEO Kevin Dinnin claimed that the organization was pressured to expand their operations by the federal government. Dinnin notified the Department of Health and Human Services on December 17 that the organization would not accept additional detainees. It was announced the following day that controversial fingerprinting requirements would be rolled back to expedite sponsorships. Conditions of the camp were not subject to scrutiny by state agencies and standard FBI fingerprint background checks for employees were waived, raising alarm about the safety of detained minors.

In 2019, employees at Wayfair staged a walk out in protest of a contract with BCFS for a minor detention facility in Carrizo Springs, Texas, a former Stratton Oilfield Systems "man camp" with estimated capacity for 1,000 detainees. In 2021, BCFS threatened to close the Carrizo Springs shelter when Health and Human Services attempted to apply requirements that would increase employees' pay above minimum wage.

== Awards ==
- 2022- Texas Emergency Management Partnership Recognition
- 2022- Texas Emergency Management Leadership Award for BCFS President and CEO, Kevin Dinnin
