= Timeline of events related to migrant children's detention centers in the United States =

This is a timeline of events related to migrant children's detention centers in the United States.

== A selected timeline of events ==
Year	Date	Event	image
1984	September 6	Harold W. Ezell, then director of Western Region of the Immigration and Naturalization Service (INS) under President Ronald Reagan, "implemented a policy under which a detained immigrant child could only be released to a parent or legal guardian". As a result, immigrant children were detained in poor conditions for "lengthy or indefinite" periods of time.	
1985		In 1985, Immigration and Naturalization Service (INS) apprehended then-15-year-old Jenny Lisette Flores, from El Salvador after she attempted to cross the Mexico–United States border, and detained her in an adult prison where she was strip searched.	
1985	July 11	The Center for Human Rights and Constitutional Law filed a class action lawsuit Flores v. Meese, No. 85-4544 (C.D. Cal. filed July 11, 1985) in the United States District Court for the Central District of California on behalf of Flores and three other minor immigrant children, against AG Edwin Meese, who served as United States Attorney General from February 25, 1985 to July 5, 1988 under President Ronald Reagan. (Note: Flores v. Meese, CV 85-4544 RJK (Px) (C.D. Cal July 11, 1985) ("Complaint for Injunctive and Declarative Relief, and Relief in the Nature of Mandamus").) (Note: Cases from the United States District Court for the Central District of California (C.D. Cal) are appealed to the United States Court of Appeals for the Ninth Circuit.) The 1985 class action lawsuit was brought against the Immigration and Naturalization Service (INS) by the Center for Human Rights and Constitutional Law (CHRCL) through lawyers Carlos Holguin and [Peter A. Schey on behalf of Flores. According to NBC News, shortly after Flores v. Meese was filed, Flores was released through a court injunction.	
1987		In 1987, the parties agreed to a consent decree regarding detention conditions but the United States District Court for the Central District of California granted summary judgment to the plaintiffs regarding the release conditions.	
1988	March 7	In Flores v. Meese, a District court judge in California placed "limits on INS treatment of alien minors in custody." (Note: Flores v. Meese, 681 F. Supp. 665 (C.D. Cal. 1988). Jenny Lisette FLORES, et al., Plaintiffs, v. Edwin MEESE, Immigration and Naturalization Service, Harold W. Ezell, Defendants. No. CV 85-4544-RJK. United States District Court, C.D. California. March 7, 1988. National Center for Immigrants' Rights, Inc., Carlos Holguin, Peter A. Schey, Los Angeles, Cal., National Center for Youth Law, James Morales, Alice Bussiere, Teresa Demchak, San Francisco, Cal., American Civil Liberties Union (ACLU Foundation of Southern California), Paul Hoffman, John Hagar, Los Angeles, Cal., for plaintiffs. Robert C. Bonner, U.S. Atty., Frederick M. Brosio, Jr., Asst. U.S. Atty., Chief, Civil Div., Ian Fan, Asst. U.S. Atty., Los Angeles, Cal., for defendants.)	
1993		In the Supreme Court case, Attorney General Janet Reno et al. v. Jenny Lisette Flores in which the Court held that the Immigration and Naturalization Service's regulations, regarding the release of alien unaccompanied minors, did not violate the Due Process Clause of the United States Constitution. (Note: Reno v. Flores, 507 U.S. 292 (1993))	
1997	January 28	The Flores agreement, which originated in Flores v. Meese, No. 85-4544 (C.D. Cal. filed July 11, 1985) "set standards for the detention of minors by prioritizing them for release to the custody of their families and requiring those in federal custody to be placed in the least restrictive environment possible", according to a June 19, 2018 NBC News article. Immigration officials agreed to provide detained minors with "food and drinking water as appropriate, medical assistance if minor is in need of emergency services, toilets and sinks, adequate temperature control and ventilation, adequate supervision to protect minors from others, contact with family members who were arrested with the minor, and separation from unrelated adults whenever possible." According to the American Civil Liberties Union (ACLU), the Trafficking Victims Protection Reauthorization Act of 2008 (TVPRA) and the settlement agreement in Flores v. Meese which was reached during the administration of Bill Clinton, set national legal standards for law governing the rights of children in the immigration process. (Note: The defendants included their agents, employees, contractors and/or successors in office and plaintiffs included named plaintiffs and all class members.) (Note: The January 17, 1997 Stipulated Settlement Agreement] of Flores v. Reno in the United States District Court for the Central District of California (C.D. Cal.), docket 85-4544 RJK (Px))||	
2002		Unaccompanied Alien Children (UAC) is a term defined by the 2002 Homeland Security Act, an act that established the United States Department of Homeland Security (DHS), that was introduced following the September 11 attacks during the Presidency of George W. Bush. United States Department of Health and Human Services (HHS), defines UAC as illegal immigrants who are under 18-years old and have no legal guardians in the United States. Part of this major re-organization within the federal government was the abolition by Congress of the Immigration and Naturalization Service (INS). INS responsibilities were transferred to entities within DHS.	
2003		The Office of Refugee Resettlement (ORR) within the United States Department of Health and Human Services (HHS) began to operate the Unaccompanied Alien Children Program. From 2003 to 2011 the ORR housed fewer than 8,000 children annually.	
2005	December	Under the George W. Bush Administration, then Department of Homeland Security Secretary Michael Chertoff approved Operation Streamline which began the trend of a "zero tolerance" approach, through which anyone crossing the border illegally would be prosecuted criminally for unlawful entry and re-entry. However, under President Bush "exceptions were generally made for adults who were traveling with minor children" according to The New York Times. The program was first rolled out starting in December 2005 at the Eagle Pass area of the Del Rio sector.	
2006	August	According to then Department of Homeland Security (DHS) Secretary, Chertoff's February 28, 2007 testimony before the Senate, by August 2006, As part of the DHS' Secure Border Initiative, the policy of "catch and return" had been replaced by "catch and release" (Note: It was during the Presidency of George W. Bush, that the phrase began to be used as part of the political lexicon and it has been used since then. Writers and academics, such as Reece Jones, and Michelle Goldberg, have said that the phrase "catch and release" article is pejorative.) along the southern and northern borders. Previously, when DHS "apprehended illegal aliens", they were released "on their own recognizance". He said that they would often not present themselves for their immigration hearings. According to Chertoff, the DHS lacked bed space to hold "non-Mexican illegal aliens". This changed in August 2006, with the "new DHS policy of "catch and return" when "all removable aliens caught at the border" were detained then returned home. This was meant to be a "strong disincentive to cross illegally". Chertoff said that the older policy of "catch-and-release" for many years, allowed many illegal immigrants to "stay in the United States unhindered". He said that Mexican border-crossers would be subject to expedited removal. People who support immigrant rights said that this new policy would result in people attempting to "cross at more remote and dangerous areas."	
2007		The Global Detention Project reported that there were 363 detention sites in use in the United States during the period 2007-2009	
2008		The Baptist Children's Center (BCFS San Antonio) in San Antonio, Texas operated by the Baptist Child and Family Services now known as BCFS Health and Human Services or BCFS was opened.	
2008	December 23	Then-President George W. Bush signed the William Wilberforce Trafficking Victims Protection Reauthorization Act of 2008, which provided "substantial new protections" to UAC by "prohibiting them from being quickly sent back to their country of origin."	
2010	September 10		
2011		Beginning in October 2011, the U.S. Government recorded a dramatic rise – commonly referred to in the United States as "the surge" – in the number of unaccompanied and separated children arriving to the United States from El Salvador, Guatemala, and Honduras. The total number of apprehensions of unaccompanied and separated children from these countries by U.S. Customs and Border Protection (CBP) jumped from 4,059 in FY 2011 to 10,443 in FY 2012 and then more than doubled again, to 21,537, in FY 2013.	
2012	June 15	Then-President Barack Obama announced an American immigration policy through an executive branch memorandum entitled the Deferred Action for Childhood Arrivals (DACA) that allowed some people who were brought to the United States as children to receive period of deferred action from deportation. DACA recipients also became eligible for an employment authorization document.	
2014		During the 2014 American immigration crisis, most children came from the Northern Triangle of Central America—Honduras, Guatemala, and El Salvador, crossing the Rio Grande. Once in the United States, they turned themselves in to the United States Border Patrol. According to a July 9, 2014 article in The New York Times, then-President Obama said the William Wilberforce Trafficking Victims Protection Reauthorization Act of 2008 was "partly responsible for tying [the] hands of the [Obama administration] in dealing with the "influx of children". Since October 2013, the number of minors who had been caught at the Southwest border, had risen to approximately 52,000, according to a July 2014 Times article. Republicans said that Obama's DACA had caused the influx of unaccompanied migrant children.	
2014	Summer	In response to the 2014 immigration crisis while Obama was President, when a "surge" of "Central Americans" arrived at the U.S.–Mexico border, "ICE adopted a blanket policy to detain all female-headed families, including children, in secure, unlicensed facilities for the duration of the proceedings that determine whether they are entitled to remain in the United States."	
2014	December	Homeland Security Secretary Jeh C. Johnson said during a press conference held at the opening of the largest immigrant detention center in the United States—the South Texas Family Residential Center in Dilley, Texas, "Frankly, we want to send a message that our border is not open to illegal migration; and if you come here, you should not expect to simply be released." The facility is operated by CoreCivic formerly known as CCA - Corrections Corporation of America and the director is Janice Killian. (Note: Corrections Corporation of America (CCA) was founded in Nashville, Tennessee, on January 28, 1983, by Thomas W. Beasley, Doctor Robert Crants and T. Don Hutto Beasley were the chief founders. Hutto had years of experience in corrections and was president-elect of the American Correctional Association. The two men met with representatives of the Federal Bureau of Prisons and Immigration and Naturalization Service (INS, now ICE), which operated under U.S. Department of Justice from 1933 to 2003, to discuss a potential joint venture for a facility to detain illegal aliens in Texas.)	
2015	May 13	In response to a "Washington, D.C. federal district court's injunction against invoking general deterrence in custody determinations", ICE announced that it would "discontinue invoking general deterrence as a factor in custody determinations in all cases involving families."	
2015	June 25	Los Angeles Times reported that CoreCivic's South Texas Family Residential Center in Dilley, Texas held 1,735 people and about 1,000 of the detainees were children.	
2015	July 24	On July 24, 2015, in the C.D. Cal. in "Flores v. Johnson", United States District Judge Dolly M. Gee, ruled that detained children and their parents who were caught crossing the border illegally could not be held more than 20 days, saying that detention centers in Texas, such as the GEO Group's privately run Karnes County Residential Center (KCRC) in Karnes City, Texas, and the T. Don Hutto Residential Center, in Taylor, Texas, had failed to meet Flores standards. Gee expanded Flores to cover accompanied and unaccompanied children. Judge Gee ruled that Flores calls on the government to release children "without unnecessary delay", which she held was within 20 days. This was a major change to Flores. Dee was an Obama-appointed federal district court judge. Judge Dee ruled that the defendants' "blanket no-release policy with respect to minors accompanied by their mothers is a material breach of the Agreement."	
2016		According to a May 31, 2019 US Customs and Border Patrol report, in FY2017, the USBP Southwest Border 41,435 unaccompanied minors were apprehended by the US Border Patrol compared to 50,036 in 2018, representing an increase of 21 percent. This chart shows the number of unaccompanied minors apprehended by the US Border Patrol spanning the years from 2014 to 2019 based on US Customs and Border Patrol statistics.	Stacked-bar chart showing the number of unaccompanied minors apprehended by the US Border Patrol, broken down by country of origin, 2014 - May 31, 2019.
2017	March 4	According to Reuters, in a March 4 CNN interview, then HSS secretary, John F. Kelly, said on that he was "considering a proposal" in which the Department of Homeland Security (DHS) would change the U.S. policy regarding the separate of children from their parents. He said he would "do almost anything to deter the people from Central America from getting on this very, very dangerous network that brings them up through Mexico into the United States", including this DHS policy shift which would put "children in the care of the Health and Human Services Department" while their parents were in custody.	
2017	June	The DHS introduced a new policy, "Human Smuggling Disruption Initiative" which targeted potential sponsors for the unaccompanied children in detention centers.	
2017	July 5	District Judge Gee issued an enforcement order against the Trump administration. On July 5, 2017, in Flores v. Sessions, Ninth Circuit Judge Stephen Reinhardt, joined by Judges A. Wallace Tashima, and Marsha Berzon, affirmed, finding that Congress had not abrogated the Agreement through subsequent legislation. In his opinion of Flores v. Sessions (No. 17-55208 D.C. No. 2:85-cv-04544- DMG-AGR) before the United States Court of Appeals for the Ninth Circuit, Judge Stephen Reinhardt ruled that "Nothing in the text, structure, or purpose of the HSA or TVPRA (Note: Trafficking Victims Protection Reauthorization Act of 2008 (TVPRA)) renders continued compliance with Paragraph 24A, as it applies to unaccompanied minors, "impermissible." (Note: See Flores v. Lynch, 828 F.3d at 910) "Nor does anything in the two statutes turn the Flores Settlement (Note: Flores Settlement) or any part of it into an "instrument of wrong". (Note: See Wright, 364 U.S. at 647.) "Not a single word in either statute indicates that Congress intended to supersede, terminate, or take away any right enjoyed by unaccompanied minors at the time of the acts’ passage. Thus, we hold that the statutes have not terminated the Flores Settlement's bond-hearing requirement for unaccompanied minors. We therefore affirm the decision of the district court granting plaintiffs' motion to enforce Paragraph 24A of the Flores Settlement in its entirety." Judge Reinhardt also said that "ORR treats some children whose parents are present in the United States as "unaccompanied alien children" if the parents are not "available to provide care and physical custody." (Note: 6 U.S.C. § 279(G)(2). See D.B. v. Cardall, 826 F.3d 721, 734 (4th Cir. 2016) (affirming the classification of a child as an unaccompanied minor when his parent was present in the United States and holding that for a parent to be "available to provide care" for a child, the parent "must be available to provide what is necessary for the child’s health, welfare, maintenance, and protection".)	
2017		In 2017 Southwest Key "served 24,877 children".	
2017		Flores v. Sessions was filed on Appeal from the United States District Court for the Central District of California Dolly M. Gee, the presiding District Judge Dolly M. Gee, argued and submitted the case on April 18, 2017 in San Francisco, California. Flores v. Sessions was filed July 5, 2017 The Ninth Court Circuit Judges heard the case, Stephen Reinhardt, A. Wallace Tashima, and Marsha Berzon. The opinion was read by Judge Stephen Reinhardt The plaintiff's attorneys in Jenny Lisette Flores, Plaintiff-Appellee, v. Jefferson B. Sessions III, Attorney General. The Appellee's included US Attorney General Jeff Sessions, Thomas E. Price (Tom Price), M.D. Secretary of Health and Human Services, (Note: Thomas E. Price (Tom Price), M.D. Secretary of Health and Human Services under President Donald Trump from February 10, 2017 until his resignation on September 29, 2017 following the release of a review by the Office of Inspector General (OIG) regarding his use of private charters and military aircraft for travel.) John F. Kelly, Secretary of Homeland Security; U.S. Department of Homeland Security; U.S. Immigration and Customs Enforcement, Defendants-Appellants.	
2017	September	Katie Waldman, a DHS spokeswoman was cited in a June 21, 2018 NBC News article as saying that, from October 16 to September 2017 there were 46 cases in which alleged human traffickers had used minors to avoid detention when they entered the United States illegally. (Note: Walsman said that from October 2016 to September 2017, there were 46 cases in which alleged human traffickers had used minors to avoid detention when they entered the United States illegally. In the first five months of FY2018 there were 191 cases or 145 more than the 46 cases in 2017 which represents the increase of 315 percent, that DHS Secretary Nielsen referred to in her June 21, 2018 White House press briefing. NBC News said that the 191 cases represent 0.5 percent of the approximately 31,000 people who crossed the border illegally in the first five months of the FY2018. Raul Ortiz, who is Deputy chief of the Rio Grande Border Patrol Sector where most of these cases were reported, said that the 600 cases of family fraud identified by agents in Rio Grande Border Patrol Sector since October 2017, "did not involve human trafficking, or the illegal transportation of someone typically for sexual exploitation or forced labor...Trafficking is very different than trying to be smuggled between points of entry.")	
2017	October	Based on the HHS's Office of Refugee Resettlement data that was reviewed by The New York Times, over 700 children were taken "from adults claiming to be their parents" from October 2017 to April 2018. This includes over a hundred children under four years old.	
2018	April 6	On April 6, 2018 then-Attorney General Jeff Sessions directed all federal prosecutors along the Southwest Border to work with Department of Homeland Security (DHS) to immediately implement the Zero Tolerance Policy, which required federal prosecutors treat "all improper entry offenses" along the Southwest Border "be referred for criminal prosecution" to the "extent practicable". On the same day, President Trump directed the Department of Homeland Security and other federal agencies to report on their efforts to end the practice of what has been referred to as "catch and release". According to The New York Times, "In April, after the border numbers reached their zenith, [President Trump's senior adviser Stephen Miller] was instrumental in Mr. Trump’s decision to ratchet up the zero tolerance policy." (Note: According to a June 19, 2018 article in The Atlantic, President Trump's senior adviser Miller strategically and intentionally deploys successful tactics such as "constructive controversy"—for example, the issue of the detention of migrant children—to create a "showdown between Trump and his angry antagonists" in which the Trump administration has an opportunity to "enlighten" voters who "witness" the showdown. According to The Times, Miller said that "zero tolerance" would be a potent tool in a severely limited arsenal of strategies for stopping migrants from flooding across the border.")	
2018	April 6	A memorandum issued by then-Attorney General Jeff Sessions entitled "Zero Tolerance for Offenses under 8 U.S.C. § 1325(a).", a new DHS policy which was implemented through an information-sharing agreement between the Office of Refugee Resettlement (ORR) and Immigration and Customs Enforcement (ICE). Under the new policy, ORR shared a "broad range of information on unaccompanied children with Immigration and Customs Enforcement (ICE), including the fingerprints of potential sponsors such as parents and legal guardians as well as members of potential sponsors’ households, for immigration enforcement purposes". With this new policy, potential sponsors hesitated to help provide placement for the children in detention centers which "drastically delayed the placement of unaccompanied children."	
2018	May	According to USA Today, The DOJ and "border authorities began to prose[cute] every adult who crossed the southwest border illegally in May". The article said that this caused "more than 2,300 children to be separated from their parents."	
2018	May 22	National Public Radio (NPR) cited an ACLU and University of Chicago Law School's International Human Rights Clinic 2018 report which alleged that from 2009 to 2014, the "physical, verbal, sexual and psychological abuse" of detained immigrant children by DHP and CBP officials, was "pervasive". According to a May 22 ACLU press release, the final report, which was co-authored by the University of Chicago Law School's International Human Rights Clinic, featured "numerous cases of shocking violence and abuse against migrant children". The report was based on "over 30,000 pages of documents dated between 2009 and 2014" that were obtained by the ACLU through a Freedom of Information Act (FOIA) lawsuit. Customs and Border Protection denied the allegations.	
2018	June 5	In a June 5 interview on the Hugh Hewitt Show, then-Attorney General Jeff Sessions, said, "If people don't want to be separated from their children, they should not bring them with them. We've got to get this message out. You're not given immunity." (Note: In the interview Sessions said, "What’s happening is we are having more people coming bringing children with them entering [... between the ports of entry illegally, and [...] you cannot give them immunity. That’s an offense. We believe every person that enters the country illegally like that should be prosecuted. And you can’t be giving immunity to people who bring children with them recklessly and improperly and illegally. [...] And so those children are being well taken care of. Within 72 hours, they’re taken to the Health and Human Services to be sure they’re properly cared for. And [...] the adults will be prosecuted like the law requires.")	
2018	June	The United States Department of Health and Human Services (HHS) had "contracts with 100 shelters in 17 states" that housed 11,313 children. Southwest Key, which is "among the largest child migrant shelter providers" in the United States, runs 27 of the 100 shelters in Texas, Arizona, and California.	
2018	June	Then-Attorney General Jeff Sessions announced that the United States would "block access to asylum for most victims of domestic violence and gang violence."	
2018	June 8	According to a June 8, 2018 The Cut, the "zero tolerance" immigration policy had resulted in the separation of thousands of families from their children as they sought asylum in the United States. The article said that horrific conditions in which migrant children are detained began to emerge in May and June. Photos of children cages made of chain-link fencing inside of the 77,000 square-foot warehouse at the Ursula Central Processing Center were published. Ursula, which is the largest U.S. Customs and Border Protection detention center for undocumented immigrants was a retrofitted to hold over 1,000 people.	CBP Ursula Central Processing Center, McAllen, Texas
2018	June 12	A photo, taken by Getty Images' photojournalist John Moore on June 12 in McAllen, Texas, of a Honduran two-year-old child—the daughter of an asylum seeker who had crossed the US-Mexican border illegally—"became the face of family separation" even though the toddler was never separated from her mother.	
2018	June 14	In a June 14, 2018 article in the Los Angeles Times, the government-contracted youth shelter Estrella del Norte (shelter) in Tucson, Arizona, which is operated by Austin-based nonprofit Southwest Key, was described as understaffed and 'prison-like'. In mid-June 2014, th 300-bed shelter for children housed 287 children. The article cited a shelter 'insider' as saying that the migrant youth shelter was "unequipped for Trump's 'zero tolerance' policy." Cindy Casares, a spokeswoman for Southwest Key said that the shelter has been in operation for 20 years and their staff ration "meets state licensing requirements". In a Los Angeles Times telephone interview with Antar Davidson, who worked at Estrella del Norte for a few months, Davidson described conditions in Estrella del Norte as "prison-like" and recounts being told to forbid siblings without their parent from hugging one another.	
2018	June 15	According to KPBS Public Media, over a period of 6 weeks in April and May government officials "separated 2,000 children from parents facing criminal prosecution for unlawfully crossing the border."	
2018	June 18	House Minority Leader Nancy Pelosi and over a dozen members of the Congressional Hispanic Caucus, including Juan Vargas (D-Chula Vista), visited Casa San Diego in El Cajon, California which is operated by Southwest Key under contract with the HHS's ORR There were 65 boys ranging in age from 6 to 17 housed there. According to KPBS Public Media, the U.S. government had separated about 10 percent of the boys from their parents.	
2018	June 18	Jennifer Harbury, a Rio Grande Valley, Texas-based civil rights lawyer, received an audio recording from a client who had recorded ten Central American children, between the ages of 4 and 10, crying shortly after being separated from their parents in a U.S. Customs and Border Protection facility in mid-June. Harbury shared it with ProPublica and it was published on June 18.	
2018	June 18	At a White House briefing, DHS Secretary Nielsen said there had been an increase of over 300 percent in cases where "minors have been used and trafficked by unrelated adults in an effort to avoid detention." According to a June 21 NBC News article federal officials have said that recently, child traffickers fraudulently posed as parents of unrelated children to cross into the United States illegally. Olivia Nuzzi from New York magazine played the ProPublica audio tape of children crying during this briefing.	
2018	June 19	In spite of a law that mandates access to lawmakers in Florida, U.S. Senator Bill Nelson, Rep. Debbie Wasserman-Schultz and other lawmakers, were denied entry to the Homestead Temporary Shelter for Unaccompanied Children in Homestead, Florida a facility that houses 1,000 migrant children. The Homestead Temporary Shelter for Unaccompanied Children holds 1,179 children ranging in age from 13 to 17 and is the "largest facility housing immigrant children in South Florida". Cape Canaveral-based Comprehensive Health Services, Inc. has a c. $31 million contract with the federal government to operate Homestead and Leslie Wood is program director.	
2018	June 20	Trump signed an executive order, which was drafted by the Department of Homeland Security (DHS) Secretary Kirstjen Nielsen, which directed DHS to "keep families together after they are detained crossing the border illegally" at the U.S.–Mexico border. USA Today said in signing the EO, Trump's was abandoning his "earlier claim that the crisis was caused by an iron-clad law and not a policy that he could reverse." DHS reported that "2,342 children were separated at the border from 2,206 adults from May 5 to June 9". According to a June 27, 2018 Reuters article, Trump's EO "contained "loopholes" and did little to fix the problem"—2,000 children "remained separated".	
2018	June 20	By December 17, 2018, 14,314 children the federal government had "placed most of the 14,300 migrant toddlers, children and teens in its care in detention centers and residential facilities packed with hundreds, or thousands, of children", according to the Associated Press. The Unaccompanied Alien Children (UAC) program "supervised over 150 programs in 17 states in 2017 and 2018." The three of the largest facilities—the Tornillo tent city, the Homestead (Florida) Temporary Shelter for Unaccompanied Children, and Casa Padre in Brownsville, Texas—housed over 5,400 children. The five largest contractors for the program—Southwest Key (headquartered in Austin, Texas); BCFS Health and Human Services (San Antonio, Texas); Comprehensive Health Services Inc. (Cape Canaveral, Florida); Cayuga Centers (Auburn, New York); and Heartland Alliance (Chicago, Illinois)—"oversaw more than 11,600 children in the UAC program".	
2018	June 23	After her June 23, 2018 tour, Rep. Debbie Wasserman-Schultz reported that at least children—from newborns to 5-year-olds—who were taken away from their parents were housed in two Miami-Dade County, Florida shelters—His House Children's Home in Miami Gardens, Florida and Catholic Charities' Msgr. Bryan Walsh Children's Village, previously known as Boys Town, in Cutler Bay, Miami. in Miami, Florida under the jurisdiction of the HHS ORR.His House Children's Home His House is a 232-bed facility.	
2019	June 24	During the June 24 episode of Washington, D.C.-based CBS News]' Face the Nation, Leslie Sanchez said that many Republicans feel that family separation [and the resulting child detention] is an "unnecessary evil." He said that this policy however was "America's pain point". Sanchez said that it was the audio [of the children crying] that was more painful than the images. He said that he had talked to a "lot of Republicans"—even bundlers, people that put big amounts of money together"—who knew they that "cries of the children [...] being separated"..."was the moment where America knew this was too far." Sanchez said that was "when the president retreated".	
2018	June 26	Washington, D.C. and seventeen states "sued the Trump administration in Seattle federal court over the family separations, calling them "cruel" and motivated by "animus."	
2018	June 27		
2018	June 26	In the case, "Ms. L et al v ICE" brought before the United States District Court for the Southern District of California in San Diego by the American Civil Liberties Union (ACLU), U.S. District Judge Dana Sabraw issued an injunction on that "blocked the Trump administration from separating immigrant parents and children at the U.S.–Mexico border". The injunction required the "government to reunite children under the age of five with their parents within 14 days, and let children talk with their parents within 10 days" that "those who were separated be reunited within 30 days". Judge Sabraw said that, "The facts set forth before the court portray reactive governance responses to address a chaotic circumstance of the government’s own making. They belie measured and ordered governance, which is central to the concept of due process enshrined in our Constitution."	
2018	June 30	The New York Times reported that there were hundreds of demonstrations in the United States and on the Mexican border protesting against migrant family separations.	
2018	July 9	In her July 9, 2018 ruling, Judge Dee of the Federal District of California, "countered" most of the Department of Justice's (DOJ) arguments. She held that there was "no basis" to modify the 1997 Flores Settlement Agreement (FSA) that "requires children to be released to [federally] licensed care programs within 20 days." The New York Times described Dee's ruling as a "significant legal setback" to President Trump's "immigration agenda" which includes family separation.	
2018	September 28	The Office of Inspector General (OIG) with John V. Kelly as Senior Official Performing the Duties of the Inspector General (Note: John F. Kelly who served as DHS secretary and later President Trump's chief of staff, and who left the Trump administration in January, is not the same person as John V. Kelly, the OIG senior official who tabled this report. According to a John V. Kelly was forced to retire from his position at OIG following reports that he "directed [OIG] auditors to produce what they called "feel-good reports" about FEMA's response to disasters — including Hurricane Sandy in 2012 and flooding in Louisiana in 2016 — that glossed over most problems.") (Note: The Office of Inspector General (OIG), which is one of the largest federal government departments, reports to the Department of Health & Human Services (HHS).) submitted a 17-page report on September 28, 2019 report which was based on "unannounced inspections" of facilities where migrant children were detained and concluded that facilities run by Customs and Border Protection (CBP) for unaccompanied alien children. The report concluded that the facilities "appeared to be operating in compliance with the 2015 National Standards on Transport, Escort, Detention, and Search. With the exception of inconsistent cleanliness of the hold rooms, we observed that unaccompanied alien children had access to toilets and sinks, drinking water, beverages (including milk and juice drinks), as well as snacks and food. Unaccompanied alien children had access to hygiene items and clean bedding at all facilities we visited. We did not encounter issues with temperatures or ventilation, access to emergency medical care, inadequate supervision, or access to telephones." The report offered no recommendations for changes.	
2019	January	A tent city in Tornillo, Texas detained about 2,800 children was closed "after a federal watchdog revealed "serious safety and health" concerns". It was operated by the Baptist Child and Family Services (BCFS) under contract from the Office of Refugee Resettlement (ORR).	
2019	April	Southern Poverty Law Center (SPLC) and the Covington and Burling law firm court filed a lawsuit on behalf of two families against the federal government for separating families at the U.S.–Mexico border according to a PBS News report.	
2019	June 20	In June 2019, three Ninth Circuit heard the case, 17-56297 Jenny Flores v. William Barr, in which Sarah Fabian, the senior attorney in the Department of Justice's Office of Immigration Litigation requested the Court to overturn the July 2017 district court's order "requiring the government to provide detainees with hygiene items such as soap and toothbrushes in order to comply with the “safe and sanitary conditions” requirement set forth in the 1997 Flores Settlement Agreement". During the June 20, 2019 proceedings, Ninth Circuit Judge William Fletcher said it was "inconceivable" that the United States government would consider it "safe and sanitary" to detain child migrants in conditions where it was "cold all night long, lights on all night long, sleeping on concrete and you've got an aluminium foil blanket?" Fabian said that the Flores agreement mandating "safe and sanitary" conditions for detained migrant children was "vague" and it was not compulsory for the government to provide toothbrushes, soap or adequate bedding to them. Educational programs for children in this type of facility were canceled by the Department of Health and Human Services in June 2019.	
2019	June 23	Based on an inspection, The New Yorker reported that infants, child and teenage migrants were being detained in the Clint Border Patrol Station without adequate food, bedding, soap, toothpaste and clean clothing. The BBC also carried the story.	
2019	July 1	A congressional delegation reported that migrant women detained at the El Paso facility were "told to drink from toilet". (Note: On July 2, 2019, Business Insider published a photo of the prison-style single-unit hybrid of a toilet and a drinking water fountain.) In July 2019, Democratic Representatives who had a scheduled tour of migrant detention centers alleged that the migrants had suffered various forms of mistreatment.	
2019	July	BBC reported that one of the reasons migrant children are being detained longer than 72 hours in detention centers is that government agencies "struggle to process the vast number of people being held at the border."	
2019	July 3	According to The New York Times, President Trump criticized the lawmakers for their negative comments about the U.S. Customs and Border Protection detention facilities and said that they were "living far better" there than in their home countries.	
2019	July 6	According to The New York Times, by July 2019, the Clint Border Patrol Station which is located four miles north of the US–Mexico Border in Clint, Texas—border partrol station and migrant detention facility, and similar facilities, had become "the public face of the chaos on America’s southern border" as reports of the conditions there became public.	
2019	July 18	Amnesty International published their report entitled "No Home For Children: The Homestead 'Temporary Emergency' Facility" describing Homestead as an "industrial-scale facility for processing mass numbers of children" which focused on "containment" not the "best interests of the unaccompanied children housed there."	
2019	July 22	According to a July 22, 2019 article in Fortune, a Department of Health and Human Services fact sheet said that approximately 10,000 unaccompanied migrant children were detained in 168 facilities in 23 states. The Office of Refugee Resettlement (ORR) runs the shelters and contracts non-profit organizations to operate them.	
2019	July 23	A HHS report, announced the imminent closure of the temporary emergency facility near Carrizo Springs, Texas. The facility, which is operated by BCFS Health and Human Services, held about 200 minors ranging in age from 13 to 17—originally from Guatemala, El Salvador, Honduras. Amnesty International USA's (AIUSA) Director Margaret Huang testified before the Subcommittee on Labor, Health and Human Services, Education, and Related Agencies/HHS about the conditions she witnessed at the facility during AIUSA's July 20 visit there. Huang also reported on conditions at the Homestead and Tornillo detention facilities.	
2019	August 1	The Southern Poverty Law Center (SPLC) and the Covington and Burling law firm court documents reveal that long-term trauma has been inflicted on potentially thousands of migrant children as families were separated U.S.–Mexico border from 2017 to 2018, according to a PBS News report. The law firms say that the family separations violate the constitution and "norms of basic human decency." This comes months after a similar suit brought by two families, also through the SPLC and Covington and Burling, in April	
2019	August 15	The first reports of the collaborative investigation undertaken by PBS Frontline and the Associated Press into the treatment of migrant minors in state-run foster homes funded by the federal ORR, were published in August 2019. The Associated Press reviewed legal claims from families who said "their children were harmed while in government custody". In 2018, "nearly 50,000 migrant children were housed in "foster homes, residential shelters and detention camps" under contract with the ORR. Some minors were unaccompanied and others were separated from the families because of the zero-tolerance policy. Arnold and Porter, one of the largest law firms in the world, have filed 18 Federal Tort Claims—a precursor to filing lawsuits—totaling $54 million against the Justice and Homeland Security departments on behalf of nine parents who "said their children were harmed while in government custody. An Arnold and Porter attorney said that there were likely "dozens more" lawsuits coming, including several from families who say "their young children were sexually, physically or emotionally abused in federally funded foster care." The New York-based Cayuga Centers, which is the "largest foster care placement organization for migrant children", is named in "three of the four incidents involving physical harm".	

== See also ==
- Trump administration family separation policy
- Casa Padre
- Casa San Diego
- Prison–industrial complex
