= Protests against the Trump administration family separation policy =

Protests against family separation policy
- Part of protests against Donald Trump
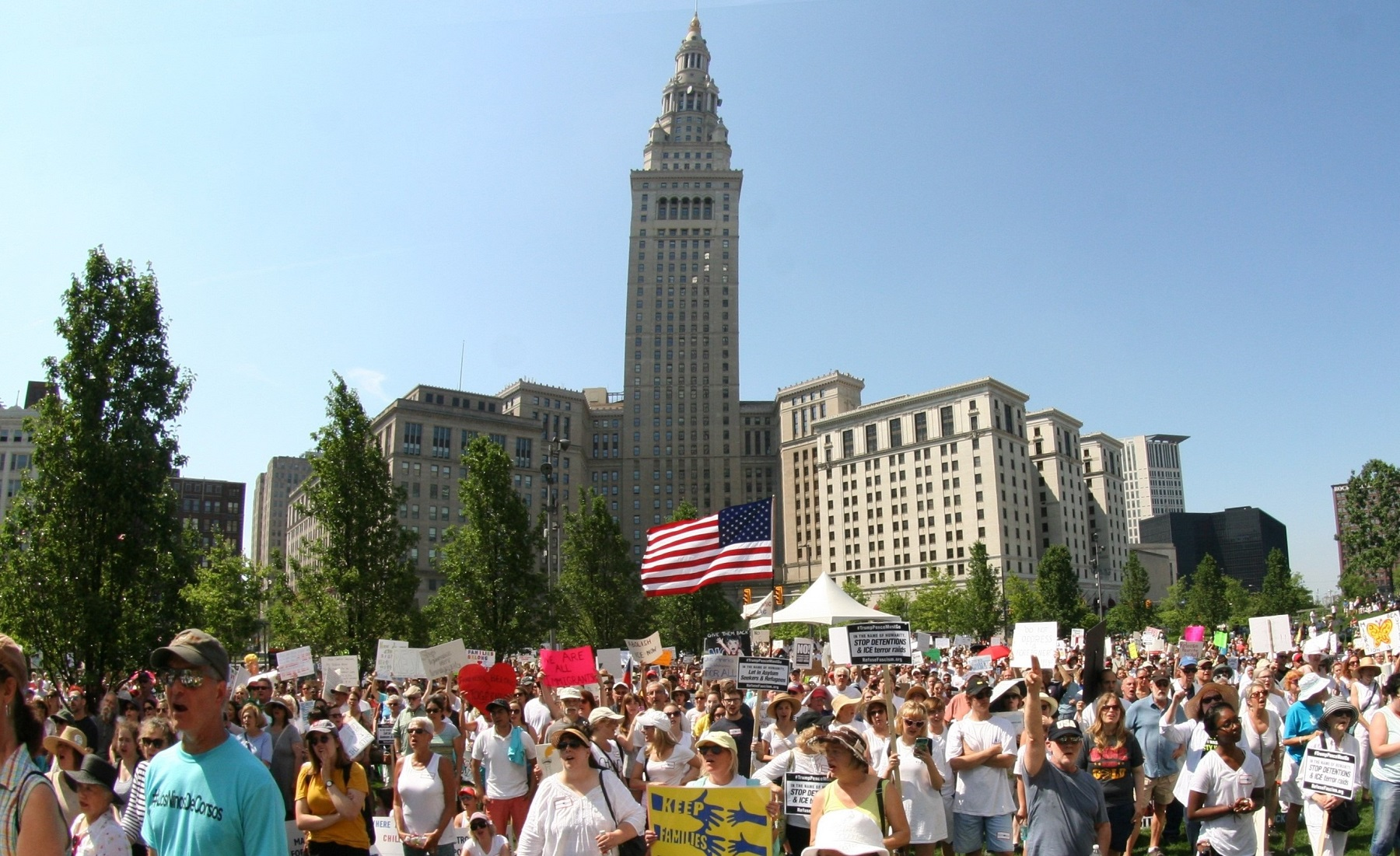
- Date: June 30, 2018 (key rally) and other dates
- Location: Washington, D.C., and over 700 other U.S. cities, and others worldwide
- Type: Demonstration (protest)
- Theme: Opposition to family separation
- Cause: Trump administration family separation policy
- Organized by: grassroots support, Families Belong Together, and other organizations
- Participants: protestors across the United States and some globally

Protests against the Trump administration family separation policy are a reaction to the Trump administration policy of separating children from their parents or guardians who crossed the U.S. border either illegally or to request asylum, jailing the adults and locating the minors at separate facilities under the care of the Department of Health and Human Services.

== Background ==
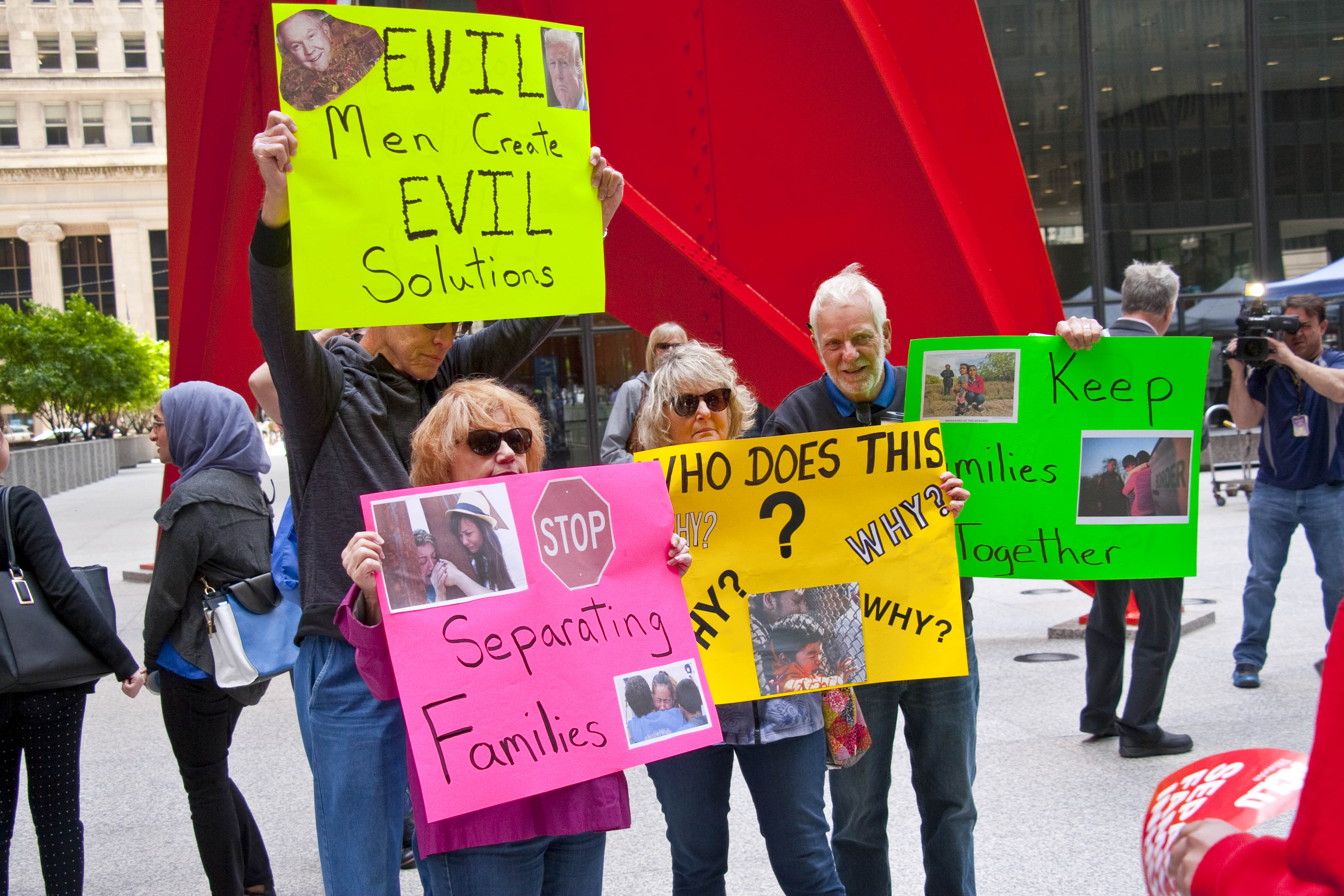
Stop Separating Immigrant Families Press Conference and Rally, Chicago (June 5, 2018)

ProPublica recording of crying children separated from their families

The Trump Administration started a "zero tolerance" policy on May 7, 2018, under which any person crossing the United States border may be charged with a federal misdemeanor. Attorney General Jeff Sessions, announced that policy. During remarks made on May 7 in Scottsdale, Arizona, he said, "If you are smuggling a child then we will prosecute you, and that child will be separated from you as required by law." However, immigration rights activists have reported that children accompanying adults have been verified to be members of families, not part of a child trafficking scheme as suggested by Sessions.

Because minors cannot be jailed under a 2016 ruling by C.D. Cal. Judge Dolly M. Gee regarding the 1997 Reno v. Flores settlement, they are separated from their families. Minors are housed in detention centers that can be made up of tents or other makeshift facilities. Illegal border crossing is a crime in the United States. However, migrants attempting to apply for asylum in the United States are also being denied entry. In addition, immigration activists allege that parents are not being reunited with their children after their parents' sentences in detention are finished. Sessions also announced that the United States would no longer accept asylum applications for migrants who are victims of domestic abuse or gang violence.

== Fundraising ==
Inspired by the viral photo of a crying two-year-old girl looking up at her mother, on June 16, 2018, a California couple started a fund-raising campaign on Facebook named "Reunite an immigrant parent with their child" with a goal of raising $1,500 (~$1,923 in 2025). As of June 20, more than $17 million had been raised. The money will go to the Refugee and Immigrant Center for Education and Legal Services, or RAICES, and provide legal aid for immigrant parents who have been arrested at the border.

The photograph was taken by professional photographer John Moore just after the mother was asked to set her child down to be body-searched before boarding the Border Patrol van and as the little girl began to cry. The mother is from Honduras and had been traveling for a month.

The photograph has raised controversy after the father of the child said in an interview that the mother and daughter were now being detained together in McAllen, Texas. This has caused many in Trump's administration to rally against "fake news;" White House Spokeswoman Sarah Sanders tweeted that the Democrats and media "exploited this photo of a little girl to push their own agenda."

A Portland, Oregon filmmaker, Linda Freeman, produced the video Unaccompanied: Alone in America, in which children re-enact court transcripts of proceedings in which migrant children who have to represent themselves in immigration trials. While this policy of children being unrepresented in court can be seen in 2005, the video is part of a fundraiser to provide legal counsel, services, and efforts to reunify children with their families.

In response to the family separation policy many celebrities, such as Chrissy Teigen and husband John Legend, donated to the ACLU in response to the "...cruel, anti-family..." actions, that "...go against everything we believe this country should represent. Others, such as Jimmy Fallon, have also donated to the Texas-based charity Refugee and Immigration Center for Education and Legal Services (RAICES), at times in Trump's name, to protest the actions and policies of the Trump Administration.

== Protests ==
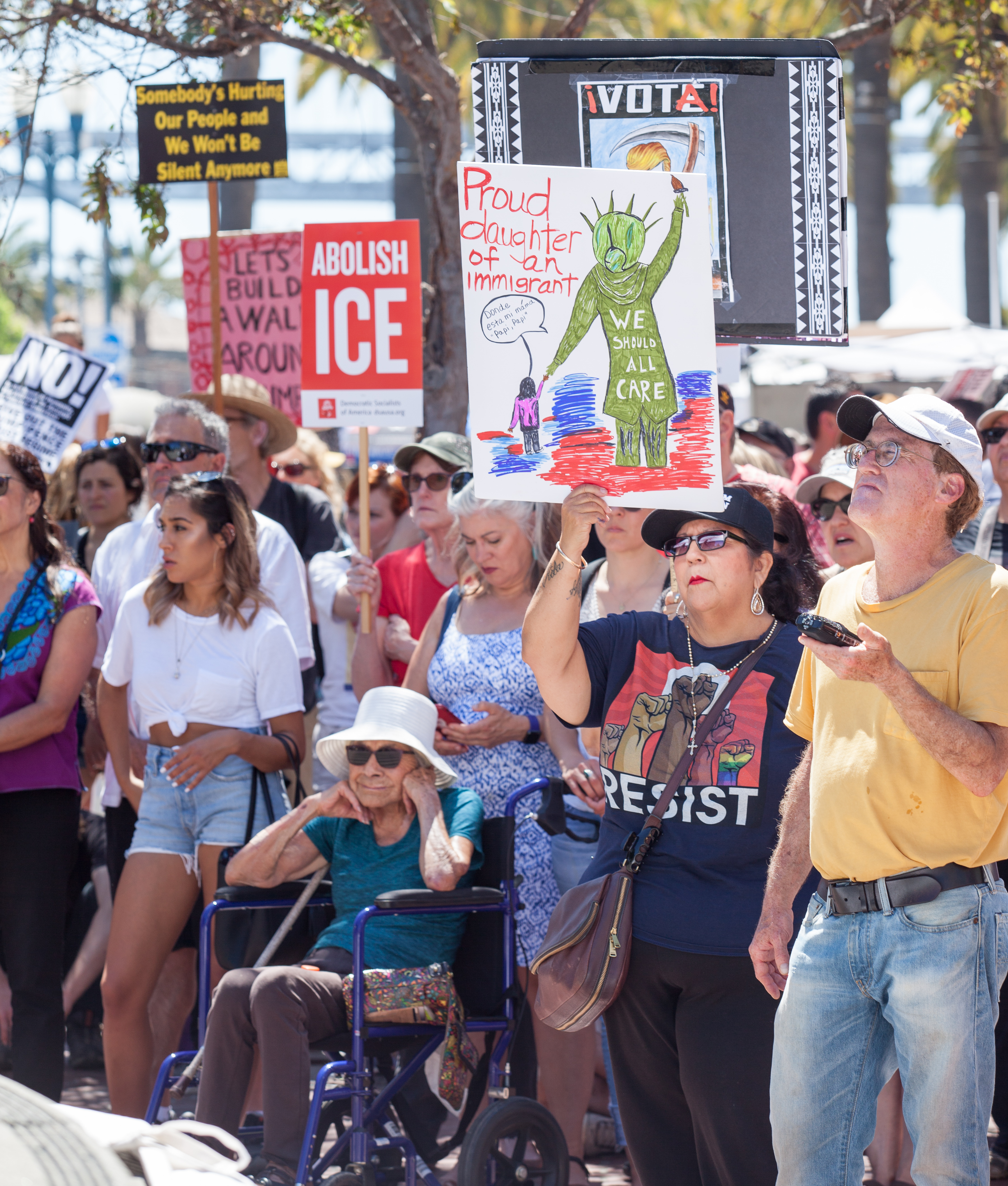
Protesters hold various signs at a "Families Belong Together" rally in San Francisco on June 23, 2018.

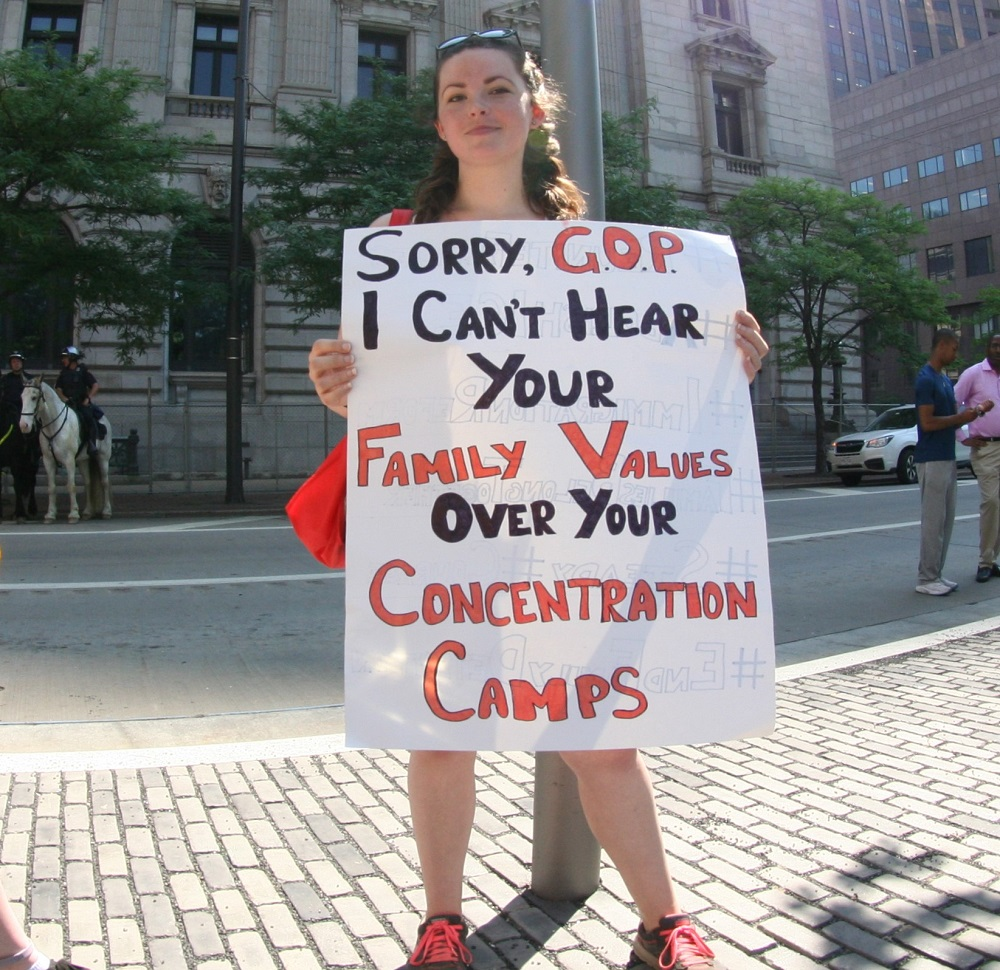
A protester compares child detention by the government to the Nazi concentration camps.

During a Congressional hearing on May 8, 2018, a group of mothers and their children held a silent protest in opposition to the zero-tolerance policy. Protests took place on May 31, 2018, in El Paso, Texas. Around 100 protestors in front of the El Paso County Courthouse held an "Evening of Action" rally. In San Antonio, around 300 people attended a #WhereAreTheChildren rally in Guadalupe Plaza. Joaquin Castro spoke at the demonstration. Some protesters compared the detainment of children by the U.S. government to the Nazi concentration camps.

On June 1, "pop up protests" were planned in around sixteen states on a national day of action. Hundreds protested the new policy, in Atlanta, New York City, Santa Monica, and Washington, D.C., on June 1. In Houston, protestors gathered outside the City Hall to demonstrate. In Concord, demonstrators gathered in front of the federal building. There were around fifty people protesting outside the federal building in San Diego. The protest in Memphis was organized in part by an attorney, Starkey Hahn. A protest took place in Austin at Republic Square Park in the afternoon. More than 100 people demonstrated outside the Immigration Services federal building in Los Angeles. Around 100 people demonstrated outside the Immigration and Customs Enforcement field office in Philadelphia. In York County, Pennsylvania, people demonstrated outside the York County Detention Center on June 2, 2018.

On June 13, 2018, eight House Democrats blocked streets to protest the family separation policy. The protest started on the steps of the US Customs and Border Protection Building in Washington, D.C. Luis Gutierrez, Joe Crowley, John Lewis, Pramila Jayapal, Jan Schakowsky, Al Green, Raúl Grijalva, Judy Chu, Adriano Espaillat, and Jimmy Gomez were joined by hundreds of activists and actor John Cusack.

Some of the marches and protests were put together very quickly. The June 17, 2018, march in Tornillo, Texas was planned in around two days. Democratic politicians in Texas, including Beto O'Rourke and Veronica Escobar, organized the march with a group called the Latino Victory Project. Joe Kennedy III, Veronica Escobar, Lupe Valdez, Mary González, César Blanco, Lina Ortega, and Gina Ortiz-Jones were also in attendance. The march was protesting a detention center for children near the port of entry in Tornillo. By June 16, 200 minors had been housed at the center, which is made up of tents in an area that experiences extreme heat in the summer. The march began at the Tornillo-Guadalupe Toll Plaza and extended to the area containing the "tent city." Also on June 17, 2018, hundreds of protesters gathered outside an immigration detention facility in Elizabeth, New Jersey. A vigil with around 200 people was held in McAllen, Texas, on June 17. Seattle also had a protest, which was held at Westlake Park. Representative Jayapal addressed the group.

A planned "Rally for Migrants" was scheduled to take place in Phoenix, Arizona. On June 18, dozens of protesters showed up to demonstrate outside the Ernest N. Morial Convention Center in New Orleans while Attorney General Jeff Sessions was speaking. Also on June 18, 2018, nearly 100 protesters took part in a New York City rally organized by the Asian American Federation of New York, calling attention to the arrest of Xiu Qing You by ICE during a green card interview.

Protesters demonstrated at LaGuardia Airport on the evening of June 20. There were around 200 protestors there to see unaccompanied immigrant minors being taken to New York.

=== Rise and Resist ===
On July 4, 2018, a female member of the group Rise and Resist, Therese Patricia Okoumou, climbed the base of the Statue of Liberty to protest the separation of migrant families, and stayed there for nearly three hours. Tourists were evacuated from Liberty Island while New York City Police Officers responded to the scene, climbing 100 ft (30 m) to reach her. Okoumou was charged with trespassing, interference with government agency functions, and disorderly conduct in a Manhattan Court on July 5. US Attorney Geoffrey Berman released a statement that Okoumou "staged a dangerous stunt that alarmed the public and endangered her own life and the lives of the NYPD officers who responded...".

Her actions were separate from an earlier protest by Rise and Resist that same day in which protesters unveiled an "Abolish ICE" banner on the statue's pedestal; seven members of the organization were arrested.

=== Families Belong Together ===
A series of protests called Families Belong Together was organized by a group of political organizations. Protests took place on several dates in June in numerous cities, including Washington, D.C., Boston, Fort Wayne, Seattle, San Francisco, New York, Cleveland, and St. Louis. In Los Angeles, there were hundreds of protestors who marched from MacArthur Park to an immigrant detention center downtown. There were also dozens of protestors in Huntington Village, New York. In Austin, hundreds of protestors rallied at the Texas State Capitol. In Eugene, Oregon, at a protest held in Kesey Square, more than 100 people attended. Akron, Ohio had 200 protesters.

On June 23, 2018, a rally in San Francisco drew more than 500 people. The event was one of a series of preliminary protests before the nationally organized Families Belong Together protests in Washington, D.C., New York City, and 700 other cities and towns in the United States.

=== Women Disobey ===
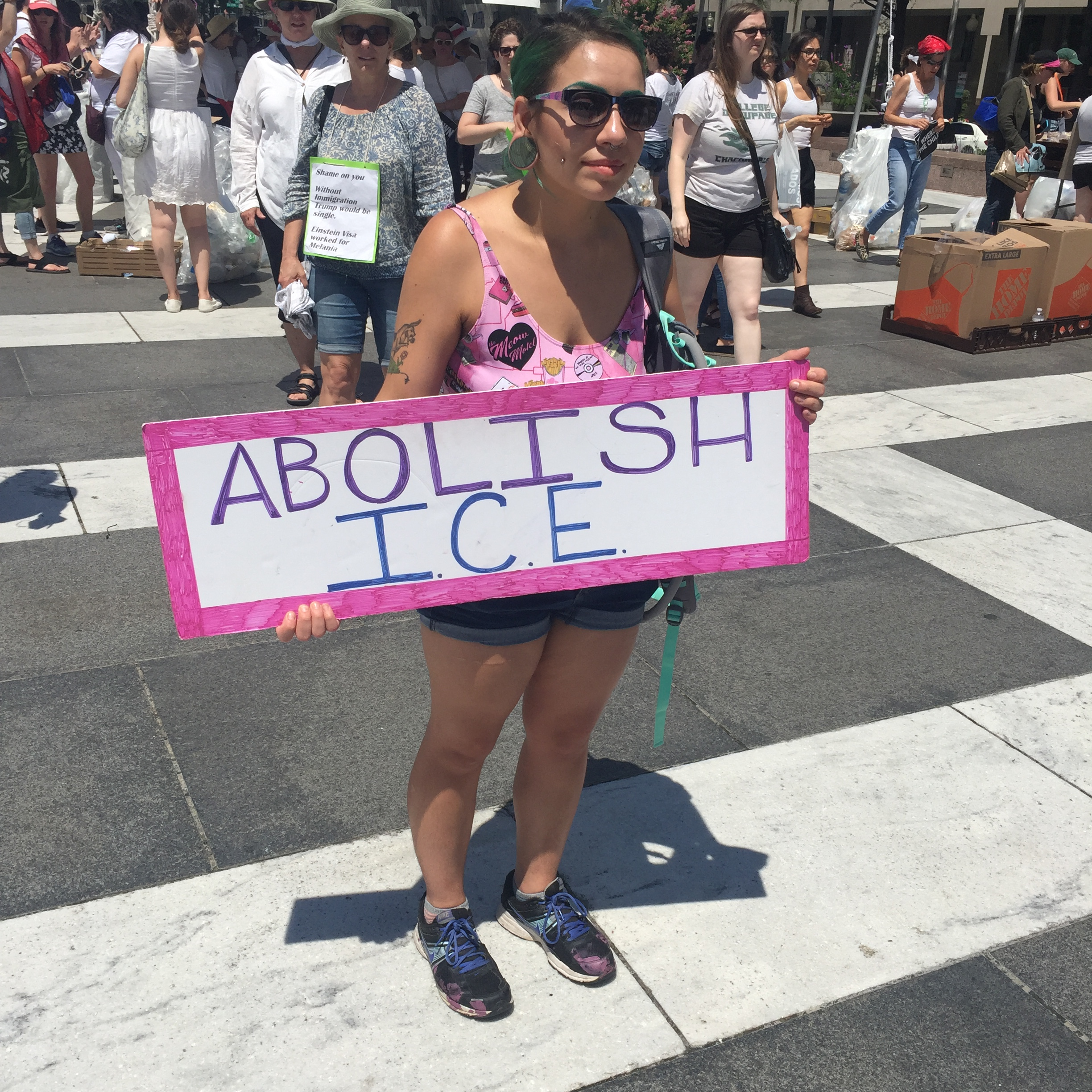
Woman demanding the abolishment of ICE. (June 28, 2018)

On June 28, 2018, a protest in Washington, D.C., was organized by Women's March. According to organizers, "2,500 women from 47 states participated in the protest." Protesters blocked streets around the Robert F. Kennedy Department of Justice Building as they demanded, "abolish ICE," the United States Immigration and Customs Enforcement Agency. The protest concluded at the Hart Senate Office Building, where 575 people were arrested following acts of mass civil disobedience. The arrested included Representative Pramila Jayapal of Washington and actress Susan Sarandon.

== See also ==
- Casa Padre
- Casa San Diego
- Family detention
- Occupy ICE
- Tornillo Tent City
- Unaccompanied Alien Children
- Ursula (detention center)
