= Immigration detention on United States military bases =

The United States government has detained or interned immigrants on military bases on several occasions, including as part of internment of Japanese Americans, of Italian Americans and of German Americans during World War II. In the 2010s, military bases have been used to house unaccompanied asylum seekers from Central America.

== World War II internment ==
These camps held detainees of Japanese, German and Italian descent:

- Fort McDowell/Angel Island, California
- Camp Blanding, Florida
- Camp Forrest, Tennessee
- Camp Livingston, Louisiana
- Camp Lordsburg, New Mexico
- Camp McCoy, Wisconsin
- Florence, Arizona
- Fort Bliss, New Mexico and Texas
- Fort Howard, Maryland
- Fort Lewis, Washington
- Fort Meade, Maryland
- Fort Richardson, Alaska
- Fort Sam Houston, Texas
- Fort Sill, Oklahoma
- Griffith Park, California
- Honouliuli Internment Camp, Hawaiʻi
- Sand Island, Hawaiʻi
- Stringtown, Oklahoma

== Central American migrants under Obama ==
As part of the 2014 American immigration crisis, tens of thousands of arriving migrants were detained by the United States. From May to August 2014, the Department of Defense operated temporary detention facilities housing as many as 7,700 unaccompanied children mostly from El Salvador, Guatemala and Honduras. The children were held at Joint Base San Antonio-Lackland in Texas, Fort Sill Army Base in Oklahoma and Naval Base Ventura County-Port Hueneme in California.

== Central American migrants under Trump ==
Amid the Trump administration family separation policy, the Department of Health and Human Services began discussing detaining arriving immigrant families and children on military facilities. Executive Order 13841, signed on June 20, 2018, instructs that, "The Secretary of Defense shall take all legally available measures to provide to the Secretary, upon request, any existing facilities available for the housing and care of alien families, and shall construct such facilities if necessary and consistent with law." On June 21, the Department of Health and Human Services requested facilities to house migrant children. Pentagon spokesmen and a memorandum sent to Congress confirmed that the Department of Defense was preparing facilities at four military bases in Texas and Arkansas to house 20,000 "unaccompanied alien children".

- Fort Bliss, near El Paso, Texas—On June 25, the Associated Press reported that Fort Bliss had been chosen to house migrant families.

== Military facilities used to house unaccompanied children ==
Military bases housing unaccompanied children, 2012–2017
Military Base	Dates	Number of UACs
Lackland Air Force Base, TX	April–June 2012	800
Lackland Air Force Base, TX	May–August 2014	4,357
Naval Base Ventura County, CA	May–August 2014	1,540
Fort Sill, OK	May–August 2014	1,861
Holloman Air Force Base, NM	January–February 2016	129
Fort Bliss, TX	September 2016–February 2017	7,259
Total		15,946
Source: Office of the Assistant Secretary of Defense for Legislative Affairs, via Congressional Research Service.

== See also ==
- List of immigrant detention sites in the United States
