= Rise and Resist =

United States political movement

Rise and Resist is a United States social advocacy group based in New York City, formed in response to the 2016 election of Donald Trump. The movement has organized several marches and protests against President Trump and his policies, as well as lent support for similar organizations' protests, such as the 2017 Women's March. In December 2017, the group also participated in protests against Trump's Tax Reform Plan.

== Political attitudes ==
Rise and Resist (RAR) started as a group upset with the results of the 2016 presidential election; the group advocates nonviolent, direct action opposition to government activity related to civil liberty and social justice.

Rise and Resist have been critical of the Independent Democratic Conference (IDC), a group of eight members of the New York State Senate who were elected as Democrats and were in a majority coalition with the Republicans in the chamber. Rise and Resist has organized several protests targeting IDC members and worked with other progressive activist groups to increase awareness of the IDC's existence and impact on state-level policy.

== Protests ==
Rise and Resist conducts multiple actions a month. On July 4, 2018, members of the group were arrested after displaying a banner that read "ABOLISH I.C.E" at the Statue of Liberty, while later another person climbed the base of the monument. It is unclear whether the one who climbed the statue was part of the group. Before the banner was displayed, the organization used Twitter to announce their actions, posting "Rise and Resist is at the Statue of Liberty demanding Trump and the GOP #AbolishICE, reunite families now, halt deportations and end detention as a deterrent."

== See also ==
- Immigration policy of President Trump
- Protests against Trump administration family separation policy
- Trump administration family separation policy
- Protests against Donald Trump
