= Clint Border Patrol Station =

US Border Patrol station and migrant detention facility

Coordinates: 31.581180°N 106.228250°W

Clint Station is a United States Border Patrol station and migrant detention facility located four miles north of the US–Mexico Border in Clint, Texas. The facility was opened in 2013. In 2019, as reports about poor conditions for detained migrant children became public, the detention facilities at Clint became "the public face of the chaos on America’s southern border," according to The New York Times.

In 2019, approximately 250 unaccompanied migrant children were held at Clint Station. According to authorities, children received "hygiene products and food — including new clothing, hand sanitizer, soap and water;" showers were available at least "every three days," depending on the level of crowding. However, other visitors to the facility, including visitors affiliated with Human Rights Watch, reported "unsanitary, crowded living conditions," in which children lacked toothbrushes, showers, and soap, and suffered from flu and lice. One pediatric emergency physician described the treatment of children in the facility as reportable child neglect.

In June 2019, in the case, 17-56297 Jenny Flores v. William Barr, Trump administration lawyers requested the United States Court of Appeals for the Ninth Circuit judges overturn the July 2017 district court’s order "requiring the government to provide detainees with hygiene items such as soap and toothbrushes in order to comply with the “safe and sanitary conditions” requirement set forth in the 1997 Flores Settlement Agreement". During the June 20, 2019 proceedings, Ninth Circuit Judge William Fletcher who said it was "inconceivable" that the United States government would consider it "safe and sanitary" to detain child migrants in conditions where it was "cold all night long, lights on all night long, sleeping on concrete and you've got an aluminium foil blanket?" According to the Pacific Standard, "Sarah Fabian, the senior attorney in the Department of Justice's Office of Immigration Litigation, argued that the sorts of conditions children were experiencing in Customs and Border Protection custody in Clint were perfectly legal," as "safe and sanitary" in Reno v. Flores is a vague requirement which doesn't specify toothbrushes, soap, etc.

Educational programs for children in this type of facility were canceled by the Department of Health and Human Services in June 2019.
