= Unaccompanied Alien Children =

US immigration program

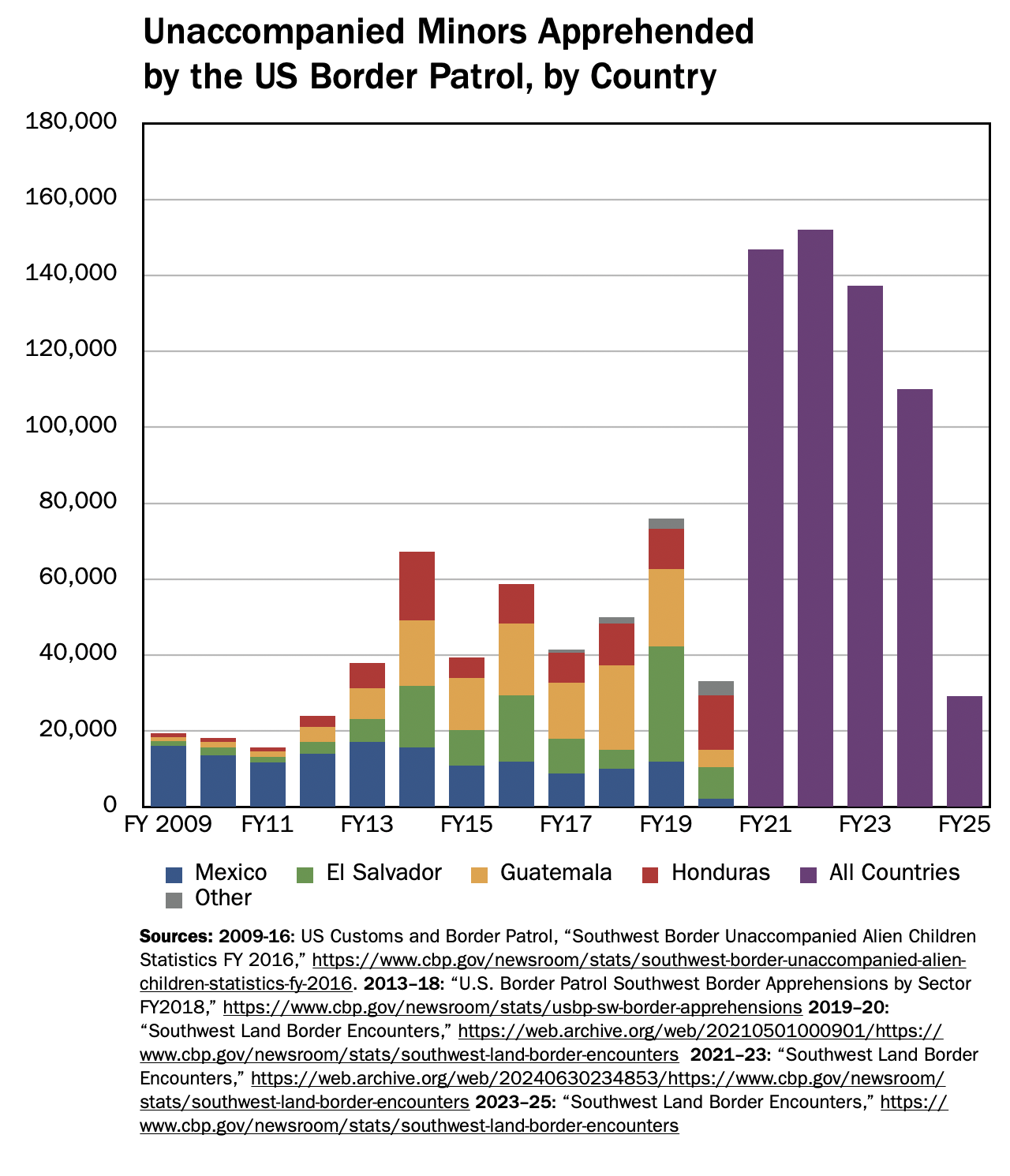
Stacked-bar chart showing the number of unaccompanied minors apprehended by the US Border Patrol, Fiscal Year 2009 through 2023, broken down by country of origin through FY 2020

Unaccompanied Alien Children (or UAC, also referred to as unaccompanied alien minors or UAMs) is a United States government classification for children in immigration custody and the name of a program operated by the Office of Refugee Resettlement (ORR; a division of the United States Department of Health and Human Services, HHS) to house and care for them. The term designates unaccompanied minors who are aliens, typically those who have been apprehended outside of a legal port of entry or judged inadmissible upon their entry.

The phrase "unaccompanied alien children" was first used in the Homeland Security Act of 2002. HHS defines "unaccompanied child" (UC) as a person "who has no lawful immigration status in the United States; has not attained 18 years of age, and with respect to whom; 1) there is no parent or legal guardian in the United States; or 2) no parent of legal guardian in the United States is available to provide care and physical custody."

However, the practice of the Department of Homeland Security is to only define children traveling with their parents or legal guardians as part of "family units" and all other children as "unaccompanied minors." As a result, children traveling with grandparents, adult siblings, and aunts and uncles are referred to the UAC program. Children separated from their parents under the Trump administration's family separation policy were referred to the UAC program.

ORR's Unaccompanied Alien Children Program began in 2003 and housed fewer than 8,000 children per year through 2011. Significant increases in the population occurred during crises in 2014, 2016, 2019, and 2020–21 all driven by a surge in unaccompanied migrants fleeing violence and poverty in the Northern Triangle of Central America. In fiscal year 2018, 49,100 children were referred to the UAC program, an average of 135 per day. This rate has since increased, and reached 287 daily referrals in April 2019. In April 2019, an average of 12,587 children were housed in the program, which then had a capacity of 14,363 beds. In April 2021, amid a renewed surge in unaccompanied minor migrants, more than 17,000 children were housed in HHS shelters, a number above the department's capacity.

Customs and Border Patrol (CBP), an agency of the Department of Homeland Security, holds unaccompanied children after their initial arrest. CBP is legally obligated to refer them to the ORR's UAC program within 72 hours, but in 2019, such children are being for weeks or months in CBP custody. On June 13, 2019, the government reported that 2,081 UAC were held by the CBP; in late June, a CBP official stated that the number had been reduced to less than 1,000.

== Age ==
Most UAC are over 14 years old. The younger minority are assumed unable to make decisions independently. In 2009–2010, 41% of children under 14 were either 13 or 14. In 2013, 24% of apprehended child arrivals were 14 or younger, meaning 76% were 15–17.

When the U.S. Border Patrol apprehends a potential minor, the agency determines age based on biographical data collected from the child and "multiple forms of evidence, including interview statements, documentation (such as birth certificates) or professional medical opinion based on radiographs (or x-rays), if necessary."

== History ==
Number of Children referred to Office of Refugee Resettlement
Fiscal Year	Number of Children
2003	4,792
2004	6,200
2005	7,800
2006	7,746
2007	8,212
2008	7,211
2009	6,639
2010	8,302
2011	7,120
2012	13,625 or 14,271
2013	24,668 or 25,498
2014	57,496
2015	33,726
2016	59,170
2017	40,810
2018	49,100
2019	69,488
2020	15,381
2021	122,731
2022	128,904
2023	118,901
2024	98,356
2025	22,833
Source: ACF FY2020 Budget Justification; ORR (2012–2021; both figures included where they conflict); ORR (2021-2025); Washington Post

The Office of Refugee Resettlement took over the supervision of unaccompanied minors in 2003. In the first nine years of its operations, it was charged with fewer than 8,000 children per year.

The number of apprehended UAC doubled from 2009 to 2013.

The 2014 American immigration crisis included an influx of unaccompanied minors. The Obama administration classified influx as an urgent humanitarian situation. Many UACs sought asylum in the United States.

After a 2015 dip, in 2016 the number of apprehended UAC rose back to high levels similar to 2014. The Border Patrol reports that it apprehended 32,372 unaccompanied minors from October 1, 2017, to May 31, 2018. There was a 4% increase in the Southwest in FY2018 compared to FY2017.

In early 2016, the Senate Homeland Security & Governmental Affairs Committee published a report that sharply criticized the ORR's mishandling of resettling UACs. The investigation found that ORR performed home studies in less than five percent of cases and never once terminated a sponsorship agreement with a sponsor. ORR's official policy stated that sponsors could refuse contact between the agency and the UAC, and should the sponsor refuse contact, the case was considered closed.

In 2018 the Trump administration reported tens of thousands of UAC were released annually and only 3.5% had been removed from the United States. In 2017 and 2018, under a zero tolerance policy, children who were separated from arrested adults they were traveling with are treated as UAC.

The number of unaccompanied minors sharply increased in 2020–21, and was projected to be larger than previous surges in 2014, 2016, and 2019. Most unaccompanied migrant children were fleeing poverty and violence in the three "Northern Triangle" countries of central America: El Salvador, Guatemala, and Honduras. By April 2021, there were more than 20,000 children and teenagers in the custody of the government, of whom almost 17,000 were in U.S. Department of Health and Human Services (HHS) shelters, and the remainder were held in U.S. Border Patrol facilities that resembled detention. The government's system was seriously strained, since it lacked the capacity to handle the surge; the Biden administration has sought to expedite transfers of migrant children from the "border jails" to HHS-run shelters, group homes, and other facilities.

The New York Times reported in April 2021: "The United States has long struggled to quickly move children out of the government's care to make room for new arrivals. Most are eventually matched with a parent who is already in the country. But others are handed over to more distant relatives, friends or foster parents. The more distant the connection, the longer the children are typically held in the shelters while health officials do background checks to ensure their safety. Of the roughly 2,000 minors released to sponsors in the past week, about half were reunited with parents or legal guardians after an average of 23 days. Those with more distant relatives had to wait on average nearly two months."

A 2022 study highlights several key findings specific to unaccompanied minors in the United States. Longer durations in federally sponsored foster care were found to be strongly associated with higher educational attainment, including increased likelihood of high school diploma completion and post-secondary enrollment, compared to minors in domestic foster care. Supportive foster parents played a critical role by providing academic assistance, advocating for minors in schools, and facilitating access to financial support for higher education. However, challenges such as financial insecurity, mental health struggles (e.g., PTSD, depression), and experiences of racial discrimination in schools negatively impacted attendance and academic performance. Young mothers who are unaccompanied minors faced heightened risks, often reducing or discontinuing education due to parenting responsibilities. Immigration detention and uncertain legal statuses further disrupted schooling, with detained minors showing lower GPAs and higher absenteeism. Lastly, supportive teachers and culturally responsive educational strategies, such as individualized language instruction and collaborative learning, were identified as resilience factors, while systemic barriers like age-inappropriate class placements and dismissive attitudes toward prior education hindered progress.

== Customs and Border Patrol detention of UACs ==
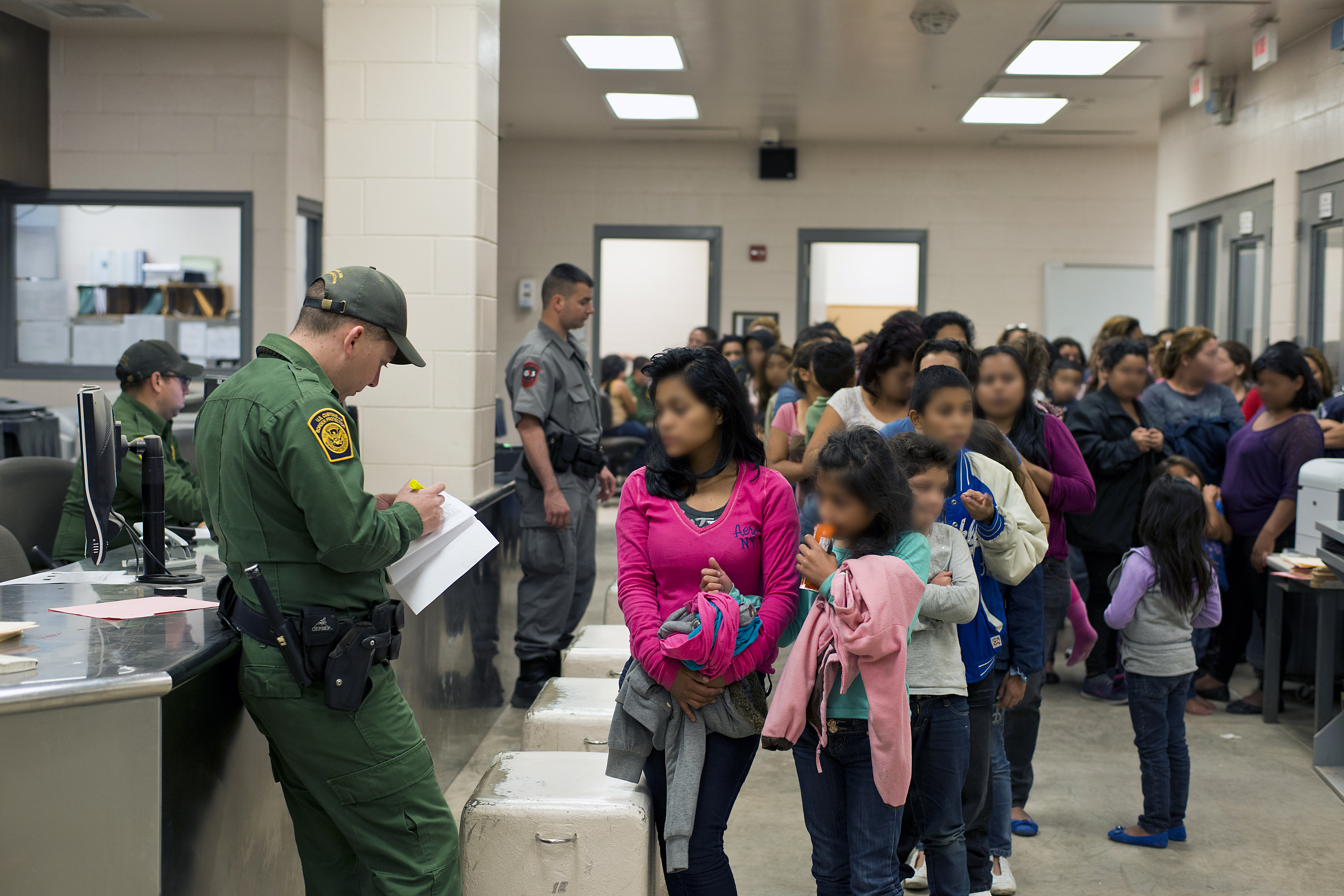
Border Patrol Processing Unaccompanied Children on the South Texas Border in 2014

Customs and Border Patrol apprehends tens of thousands of children annually at the US–Mexico border, including those who are deemed inadmissible for legal entry into the United States at ports of entry and those detained outside of ports of entry. The CBP assigns children a status as either a member of a "family unit" or an unaccompanied minor, according to the following definition: "Individuals under the age of 18 who were not with their biological parent or legal guardian at the time of the encounter." Adults traveling with children are required to verify their legal or biological parentage, and if they cannot, the children are deemed unaccompanied. As a result, children traveling with grandparents, adult siblings, and aunts and uncles are referred to the UAC program.

Regardless of whether they are deemed UACs or part of family units, children and adults are initially held in CBP processing centers. The 1997 Flores v. Reno Settlement Agreement requires the government to hold children "in facilities that are safe and sanitary" and to rapidly transfer unaccompanied children to ORR custody. In mid-2019 reports on conditions in CBP processing centers showed that children were being held for days or weeks rather than the 72-hour maximum required under Flores. HHS Secretary Alex Azar stated on June 24, 2019, that, "We do not have capacity for more of these unaccompanied children who come across the border. And what happens is they get backed up there at the Department of Homeland Security's facilities because I can't put someone in a bed that does not exist in our shelters."

=== Conditions ===
In June 2019, a legal team inspected (per the Flores settlement) a facility in Clint, Texas (near El Paso) where 250 infant, child and teenage migrants were detained. The lawyers accused the government of neglecting and mistreating the young migrants. The relatively older minors had to take care of the younger ones. The children said they were not fed fruits or vegetables and had not bathed or changed their clothes in weeks. The children were "essentially being warehoused, as many as 300 children in a cell, with almost no adult supervision." The children were "malnourished", there were outbreaks of flu and lice, and "children sleeping on the floor". Professor Warren Binford of the Willamette University was one of the inspectors. She declared that in her years of inspections, this was "the worst conditions" she had ever seen. She also said that the children at Clint were claiming asylum. In response to the situation at Clint, Customs and Border Protection (CBP) declared: "our short-term holding facilities were not designed to hold vulnerable populations and we urgently need additional humanitarian funding to manage this crisis."

Also that month, Dolly Lucio Sevier, a board-certified doctor, visited the largest CBP detention center in the United States, the Ursula facility in McAllen, Texas which held migrant minors. Her visit came after a flu outbreak at the facility that resulted in five infants requiring to enter a neonatal intensive care unit. Sevier wrote that a medical declaration that the "conditions within which [the migrant minors] are held could be compared to torture facilities ... extreme cold temperatures, lights on 24 hours a day, no adequate access to medical care, basic sanitation, water, or adequate food." All of the 39 children she assessed showed signs of trauma.

Under federal law, the migrant minors were supposed to be detained for a maximum of 72 hours. At both the facilities in Clint and McAllen, many children said that they had been detained for three weeks or more.

In June 2019, three Ninth Circuit heard the case, 17-56297 Jenny Flores v. William Barr, in which Sarah Fabian, the senior attorney in the Department of Justice's Office of Immigration Litigation requested the Court to overturn the July 2017 district court's order "requiring the government to provide detainees with hygiene items such as soap and toothbrushes in order to comply with the "safe and sanitary conditions" requirement set forth in the 1997 Flores Settlement Agreement". During the June 20, 2019 proceedings, Ninth Circuit Judge William Fletcher said it was "inconceivable" that the United States government would consider it "safe and sanitary" to detain child migrants in conditions where it was "cold all night long, lights on all night long, sleeping on concrete and you've got an aluminium foil blanket?" Fabian said that the Flores agreement mandating "safe and sanitary" conditions for detained migrant children was "vague" and it was not compulsory for the government to provide toothbrushes, soap or adequate bedding to them.

== Office of Refugee Resettlement UAC Program facilities ==
The ORR coordinates a network of over 100 facilities in seventeen states housing over ten thousand children within the UAC program. Approximately, 11,400 children were in ORR custody in mid-June 2018. The largest share of these children—5,129—were held in facilities managed by Southwest Key Programs, an Austin-based non-profit with facilities in Texas, Arizona, and California. On average, as of June 15, 2018, children had stayed in these facilities for 57 days. According to spokesperson Wolfe, the Tornillo Port of Entry is being used as a temporary shelter for UAC.

By December 17, 2018, 14,314 children were housed by the program. Overall, the Associated Press reported that the UAC program supervised over 150 programs in 17 states in 2017 and 2018, noting that their conditions "range from bucolic to jail-like." At that time, the three largest facilities—the Tornillo tent city, the Homestead (Florida) Temporary Shelter for Unaccompanied Children, and Casa Padre in Brownsville, Texas—housed over 5,400 children. The five largest contractors for the program oversaw more than 11,600 children in the UAC program. These providers are Southwest Key (headquartered in Austin, Texas); BCFS Health and Human Services (San Antonio, Texas); Comprehensive Health Services Inc. (Cape Canaveral, Florida); Cayuga Centers (Auburn, New York); and Heartland Alliance (Chicago, Illinois).

In June 2019, HHS cut all recreational and educational programs for unaccompanied children to focus its budget on providing for the basic needs of the children it houses.

UAC facilities include the following:

- Casa Padre, a private facility owned and operated by Southwest Key Programs, in Brownsville, Texas—A housing facility for children built in a former Walmart and operated under contract for the Department of Health and Human Services. On June 13, it housed 1,469 children, a plurality of whom arrived as unaccompanied minors crossing the border. S

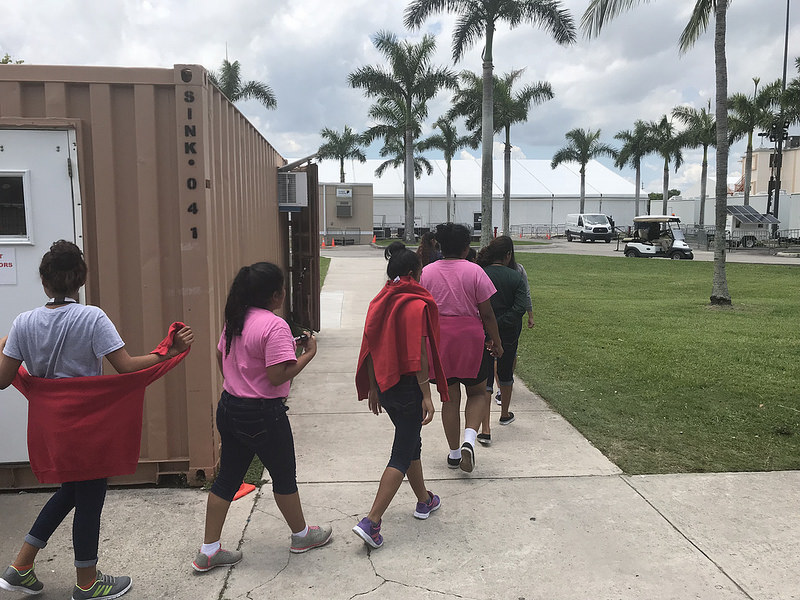
Unaccompanied minors walk in a Homestead, Florida, facility supervised by the Office of Refugee Resettlement, on June 20, 2018.

- Estrella del Norte, a private facility owned and operated by Southwest Key Programs, in Tucson, Arizona—A 300-bed housing facility for children, that housed 287 children in mid-June 2018.
- An East Harlem, New York shelter run by Cayuga Centers, Children's Village in Dobbs Ferry, New York, and additional shelters in Long Island, in Westchester and the Bronx are among nine facilities in New York state house unaccompanied children.

== Military facilities used to house unaccompanied children ==
Military bases housing unaccompanied children, 2012–2017
Military Base	Dates	Number of UACs
Lackland Air Force Base, TX	April–June 2012	800
Lackland Air Force Base, TX	May–August 2014	4,357
Naval Base Ventura County, CA	May–August 2014	1,540
Fort Sill, OK	May–August 2014	1,861
Holloman Air Force Base, NM	January–February 2016	129
Fort Bliss, TX	September 2016–February 2017	7,259
Total		15,946
Source: Office of the Assistant Secretary of Defense for Legislative Affairs, via Congressional Research Service.

== See also ==
- 2014 American immigration crisis § Surge in unaccompanied children migrating to the United States from Central America
- crime in El Salvador § Unaccompanied minors fleeing El Salvador
- Unaccompanied minor
- Criminal impersonation
- Emergency Supplemental Appropriations Act, 2014
- Family immigration detention in the United States
- Flores Agreement
- Office of Refugee Resettlement
- San Pedro Sula
- Timeline of events related to migrant children's detention centers in the United States
- Unaccompanied asylum-seeking children in the United Kingdom
