= His House Children's Home =

Foster care facility in Florida, U.S.

His House Children's Home is a foster care facility in Miami Gardens, Florida. The shelter is run by a religious organization and later became a designated shelter to care for unaccompanied minor immigrants at the border.

== About ==
His House Children's Home was founded by Jean Caceres-Gonzalez. The shelter is located in Miami Gardens, Florida, and is made up of a series of buildings which are fenced in. His House is run by a religious organization and began taking in immigrant children in 2014. The shelter has a capacity of 232 beds.

After the Trump administration family separation policy went into effect, the shelter took in babies and toddlers that were separated from their families at the border.

== Criticism ==
Government audits, taken after 2015, found that the shelter may have not been properly following policies for 652 children in their care. Other accusations of the shelter include allegations of unappetizing food, an atmosphere of living in a detention center and that "caregivers sometimes have sex with each other while on duty." These allegations are being investigated.
