= Southwest Key =

Texas-based nonprofit organization

Southwest Key Programs, Inc
- Industry: nursing facilities and child detention centers
- Founded: 1987
- Headquarters: Austin, Texas
- Revenue: 767,705,237 United States dollar (2022)
- Total assets: 205,924,874 United States dollar (2022)
- Number of employees: 7,257 (2017)
- Website: https://southwestkey.org/

Southwest Key Programs is a Texas-based nonprofit organization that operates shelter facilities for unaccompanied immigrant minors and immigrant youth. It also provides youth justice alternative programming and educational programming. The organization was founded in 1987. Southwest Key reported in August 2016 that it operates in 3 states: California, Arizona, and Texas, with annual revenues of $242 million in 2016.

Southwest Key Inc., is the sole owner of Southwest Key Enterprises, a for-profit company made up of several small businesses, including: Cafe del Sol, Southwest Key Green Energy & Construction, Southwest Key Workforce Development, and Southwest Key Maintenance, all of which serve to create job development opportunities in the community where they operate.

In 2024, the organization was accused of pervasive sexual abuse of minors by the U.S. Department of Justice.

== History and financials ==
The organization was founded by former Chief Executive Officer and President, Juan Sánchez, a former migrant farm worker. Dr. Sanchez stepped down as leader of the organization in spring 2019.

The first year Sanchez started the organization, they took care of 21 juvenile offenders on parole using a state grant of $200,000. In order to buy a copier and computer, Southwest Key borrowed $6,700 in loans. In the late 1980s, Sanchez helped a colleague, Ruben Gallegos, set up a nonprofit organization, International Educational Services, to house immigrants in Brownsville, Texas. Southwest Key began operating shelters starting in 1996. They opened facilities in Coolidge, Arizona and El Paso, Texas and made $2.5 million more than the previous year in revenue.

The organization reported annual revenue of $242,755,041 for the year ended August 31, 2016, 98.9% of which came from grants and contracts. Southwest Key's largest source of revenue is grants and contract revenue. In 2018, the organization reported having $61 million in revenue. Southwest Key first opened an immigrant shelter in the late 1990s. It now describes itself as "one of the largest providers of services to unaccompanied children in the U.S." As of mid-2018, it houses 5,100 immigrant children and operates 26 immigrant youth facilities in Texas, Arizona, and California.

In 2015, Southwest Key received $193,948,228 in contracts from the "unaccompanied alien children" program, the majority of its federal grants. As of June 2018, it has received $310,824,288 in federal grants in fiscal year 2018 (which began on October 1, 2017). Under a contract signed in June 2018, its total grant revenue for immigrant youth shelters will reach $458 million for the fiscal year. In 2016, Southwest Key Programs' CEO Juan Sanchez was paid a base salary of $770,860 and received additional compensation for a retirement policy, under the direction of the Board of Directors, who work with outside auditors to evaluate all executive pay. Vice President Nelson earned $500,000 in 2017, while the organization's chief financial officer made $1 million.

Grants for housing for immigrant children increased dramatically during the Central American refugee crisis. Following the announcement of the Trump administration's family separation policy, by mid-June 2018, the number of children it housed increased dramatically again. In mid-June 2018, the company reported that children separated from their parents represented about 10% of children that Southwest Key housed.

An ex-employee, Antar Davidson, said in June 2018 that employees were told to tell crying siblings, traumatized because they were just separated from their parents, that they weren't allowed to hug and comfort each other. Both Southwest Key and the Health and Human Services Department denied the claims. Amid the criticism that Southwest Key faced, CEO Juan Sanchez penned an op-ed about the reasons he founded the organization.

During the height of the outcry against the Trump zero-tolerance policy, lawmakers throughout the U.S. toured Southwest Key shelters. While one lawmaker praised the organization for being "very well run," other lawmakers noted that their tours "raised a lot of questions" and that things "seemed very controlled." Conservative critics have felt that the shelters "coddled illegal immigrants" and in 2014, Senator Chuck Grassley publicly criticized Southwest Key for spending too much on the children. Senator Jeff Merkley was turned away from a visit to a Southwest Key facility in 2018.

As of February 2011, Southwest Key facilities contained 11,000 children.

== Housing facilities for immigrant children ==
With 16 locations in Texas, Southwest Key Programs is one of the largest contractors housing unaccompanied immigrant children in that state and is licensed as a 24-hour childcare facility by the State of Texas. Southwest Key Programs has served 23,000 children over the last two years.

- Casa Padre in Brownsville, Texas—A shelter for boys age 10-17 built in a former Walmart and operated under contract for the Department of Health and Human Services. On June 13, it housed 1,469 children, a plurality of whom arrived as unaccompanied minors crossing the border. Southwest Key estimated that 5% of children held there had been separated from their parents.
- Casa El Presidente in Brownsville, Texas—A housing facility for babies and toddlers built in a former medical center. In mid-2018, it was reported that one twelve-month-old girl held in the facility had been separated from her family for around a month.
- Casa El Paso in El Paso, Texas, opened in March 1997.
- Nueva Esperanza in Brownsville Texas which held 208 unaccompanied minors as of May 2018
- La Esperanza in Brownsville Texas which held 71 unaccompanied minors as of May 2018
- Estrella del Norte in Tucson, Arizona—A 300-bed shelter for children, that housed 287 children in mid-June 2018. A former staff member, Antar Davidson, described conditions in the facility as "prison-like" and recounts being told to forbid siblings without their parent from hugging one another.
- Hacienda del Sol in Youngtown, Arizona
- Southwest Key-Casa Quetzal in Houston, Texas which held 233 unaccompanied minors as of May 2018
- Casa San Diego in El Cajón, California, holds 65 boys aged 6 to 17. About 10% of them were children separated from their families as of mid-June 2018.
- Casa Lemon Grove in Lemon Grove, California, a 14-bed center for children aged 6 to 17.
- Casa El Cajon near El Cajón, California, an 11-bed center for children aged 6 to 17.
- Casa Kokopelli in Mesa, Arizona.

== Proposed UM licensed childcare shelters ==
- Houston facility for young children, pregnant girls, and teenage mothers—Southwest Key has leased a 53,600-square-foot building—419 Emancipation Avenue—formerly occupied by the non-profit Star of Hope in Houston, Texas, and applied to use it as an immigrant children's shelter for up to 200 migrant youth "from age 0 to 17." Advocates report that the facility would house "children younger than 12 as well as pregnant and nursing teenagers"; the Department of Health and Human Services refers to this younger age group as "tender-age children" Houston Mayor Sylvester Turner held a press conference denouncing the use of the shelter for separated children. Turner said, "I do not want to be an enabler in this process. I do not want the city to participate in this process. The health department has yet to provide a food permit or shelter permit. … If we don’t speak, if we don’t say no, then these types of policies will continue.”

== Allegations of sexual abuse ==
In 2017, a care worker at Casa Kokopelli was accused of sexually molesting teens at the shelter. The facility in which the care worker was employed was cited in 2017 for failing to complete background checks for its employees to ensure that no one had previously committed sex offenses and other crimes. The accused worker had been working at Southwest Key's Casa Kokopelli shelter for almost four months without a complete background check, though those documents did not show any previous arrests or convictions for sex offenses, according to the Arizona Department of Health Services officials, Pro Publica reports.

Another shelter in Phoenix, had an employee who was accused of molesting a teenage girl housed there in 2018. The shelter in Youngtown, Arizona, was closed when several Southwest Key staff members were accused of physically abusing children at the shelter.

In July 2024, the United States Department of Justice sued Southwest Key, alleging over 100 incidents of sexual abuse or harassment, some dating back to 2015.

== Allegations of mismanagement ==
In February 2019, chief financial officer Melody Chung resigned, following an investigation by the New York Times into Southwest Key's management and finances. As of 2017, her salary had been US$1M. On March 11, 2019, Sanchez also resigned. As of 2017, his salary had been US$1.5M.

== See also ==
- Casa Padre
- Casa San Diego
- Prison–industrial complex
