= Dolly Gee =

American judge (born 1959)

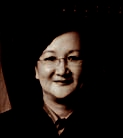

Chief Judge of the United States District Court for the Central District of California
- Incumbent
- Assumed office March 31, 2024
- Preceded by: Philip S. Gutierrez

Judge of the United States District Court for the Central District of California
- Incumbent
- Assumed office January 4, 2010
- Appointed by: Barack Obama
- Preceded by: George P. Schiavelli

Personal details
- Born: July 1, 1959 (age 66) Hawthorne, California, U.S.
- Education: University of California, Los Angeles (BA, JD)

Chinese name
- Chinese: 朱美瑜
Transcriptions
Standard Mandarin
- Hanyu Pinyin: Zhū Měi Yú
Yue: Cantonese
- Jyutping: Zyu^{1} Mei^{5} Jyu^{4}

Dolly Maizie Gee (Chinese: 朱美瑜; born July 1, 1959) is the chief United States district judge of the United States District Court for the Central District of California.

== Early life and education ==
Gee was born in Hawthorne, California, the daughter of Cantonese immigrants from Taishan. Gee's father was a World War II veteran who later worked as an aerospace engineer on projects like the Apollo missions and the Space Shuttle, while her mother was a garment worker. Gee graduated from Saint Mary's Academy high school in Inglewood, CA in 1977. Gee earned a Bachelors of Arts from the University of California, Los Angeles in 1981 and a Juris Doctor from University of California, Los Angeles School of Law in 1984. From 1984 until 1986, Gee served as a law clerk for Judge Milton Schwartz of the United States District Court for the Eastern District of California.

== Professional career ==
In 1986, Gee joined the Los Angeles law firm of Schwartz, Steinsapir, Dohrmann & Sommers LLP. She served as an associate from 1986 until 1990, and became a partner in 1990. From 1994 until 1999, Gee also served as a member of the Federal Service Impasses Panel, a federal labor relations authority.

== Federal judicial service ==
=== Expired nomination to federal district court under Clinton ===
On May 27, 1999, President Bill Clinton nominated Gee to be a judge on the United States District Court for the Central District of California to replace Judge John G. Davies. However, with Republicans in control of the United States Senate, Gee's nomination languished, despite her meeting with Clinton on May 24, 2000. Gee never received a hearing before the Republican-controlled United States Senate Committee on the Judiciary, and her nomination was returned to Clinton at the end of his presidency. President George W. Bush later successfully nominated John F. Walter to the seat to which Gee had been nominated.

=== Nomination to district court under Obama ===
On August 6, 2009, President Barack Obama nominated Gee to a seat on the United States District Court for the Central District of California, to fill the seat vacated by Judge George P. Schiavelli, who resigned in October 2008. On October 15, 2009, the United States Senate Committee on the Judiciary referred Gee's nomination to the full Senate. The Senate confirmed Gee by unanimous consent on December 24, 2009. She received her commission on January 4, 2010. On March 19, 2010, Gee was inducted to California's branch of the United States District Court. This makes her the first Chinese American woman to serve as an Article III Judge. She became chief judge on March 31, 2024.

== Notable rulings ==
=== Ruling on Trump's family detention policy ===
In June 2018, US Attorney General Jeff Sessions requested that the U.S. District Court for the Central District of California modify the Flores Agreement “in a manner that would permit the Secretary, under present resource constraints, to detain alien families together throughout the pendency of criminal proceedings for improper entry or any removal or other immigration proceedings.” On July 9, 2018, Gee rejected the request, citing that there was no basis to modify the agreement and pointing out that it is an issue the legislative branch has to solve instead. She ruled at the time that immigrant children generally can't be held longer than 20 days. On June 26, 2020, Gee ruled that migrant children held longer than 20 days must be released because of the COVID-19 pandemic in the United States.

== See also ==
- List of Asian American jurists
- List of first women lawyers and judges in California
- List of first women lawyers and judges in the United States

Legal offices
Preceded by George P. Schiavelli	Judge of the United States District Court for the Central District of California; 2010–present	Incumbent
Preceded by Philip S. Gutierrez	Chief Judge of the United States District Court for the Central District of California; 2024–present	Incumbent
