= Reno v. Flores =

- Supreme Court of the United States

Argued October 13, 1992 Decided March 23, 1993
- Full case name: Janet Reno, Attorney General, et al. v. Jenny Lisette Flores, et al.
- Citations: 507 U.S. 292 (more) 113 S. Ct. 1439; 123 L. Ed. 2d 1; 1993 U.S. LEXIS 2399; 61 U.S.L.W. 4237; 93 Cal. Daily Op. Service 2028; 93 Daily Journal DAR 3628; 7 Fla. L. Weekly Fed. S 73

Case history
- Prior: 942 F.2d 1352 (9th Cir. 1991); cert. granted, 503 U.S. 905 (1992).

Holding
- INS regulation—which provides that alien juveniles detained on suspicion of being deportable may be released only to a parent, legal guardian, or other related adult—accords with both the Due Process Clause and the Immigration and Nationality Act.

Court membership
- Chief Justice William Rehnquist Associate Justices Byron White · Harry Blackmun; John P. Stevens · Sandra Day O'Connor; Antonin Scalia · Anthony Kennedy; David Souter · Clarence Thomas

Case opinions
- Majority: Scalia, joined by Rehnquist, White, O'Connor, Kennedy, Souter, and Thomas
- Concurrence: O'Connor, joined by Souter
- Dissent: Stevens, joined by Blackmun

Laws applied
- 8 U.S.C. § 1252(a)(1)

Reno v. Flores, 507 U.S. 292 (1993), was a Supreme Court of the United States case that addressed the detention and release of unaccompanied minors.

The Supreme Court ruled that the Immigration and Naturalization Service's regulations regarding the release of alien unaccompanied minors did not violate the Due Process Clause of the United States Constitution. The Court held that "alien juveniles detained on suspicion of being deportable may be released only to a parent, legal guardian, or other related adult." The legacy for which Reno v. Flores became known was the subsequent 1997 court-supervised stipulated settlement agreement which is binding on the defendants (the federal government agencies)—the Flores v. Reno Settlement Agreement or Flores Settlement Agreement (FSA) to which both parties in Reno v. Flores agreed in the District Court for Central California (C.D. Cal.). (Note: According to the Congressional Research Service January 18, 2017 report, many of the terms of the Flores Settlement Agreement, Flores v. Meese—Stipulated Settlement Agreement (U.S. District Court, Central District of California, 1997), have been codified at 8 CFR §§236.3, 1236.3.) The Flores Settlement Agreement (FSA), supervised by C.D. Cal., has set strict national regulations and standards regarding the detention and treatment of minors by federal agencies for over twenty years. It remains in effect until the federal government introduces final regulations to implement the FSA agreement. The FSA governs the policy for the treatment of unaccompanied alien children in federal custody of the legacy INS and its successor—United States Department of Homeland Security (DHS) and the various agencies that operate under the jurisdiction of the DHS-in particular the United States Citizenship and Immigration Services (USCIS). The FSA is supervised by a U.S. district judge in the District Court for Central California.

The litigation originated in the class action lawsuit Flores v. Meese filed on July 11, 1985 by the Center for Human Rights and Constitutional Law (CHRCL) and two other organizations on behalf of immigrant minors, including Jenny Lisette Flores, who had been placed in a detention center for male and female adults after being apprehended by the former Immigration and Naturalization Service (INS) as she attempted to illegally cross the Mexico–United States border. Under the Flores Settlement and current circumstances, DHS asserts that it generally cannot detain alien children and their parents together for more than brief periods. In his June 20, 2018 executive order, President Trump had directed then-Attorney General Jeff Sessions to ask the District Court for the Central District of California, to "modify" the Flores agreement to "allow the government to detain alien families together" for longer periods, which would include the time it took for the family's immigration proceedings and potential "criminal proceedings for unlawful entry into the United States". On July 9, Judge Gee of the Federal District of California, ruled that there was no basis to amend the 1997 Flores Settlement Agreement (FSA) that "requires children to be released to licensed care programs within 20 days."

In 2017, U.S. District Judge Dolly Gee found that children who were in custody of the U.S. Customs and Border Protection lacked "food, clean water and basic hygiene items" and were sleep-deprived. She ordered the federal government to provide items such as soap and to improve the conditions. The federal government appealed the decision saying that the order forcing them to offer specific items and services exceeded the original Flores agreement. The June 18, 2019 hearing became infamous and caused nationwide outrage when a video of the Department of Justice senior attorney arguing against providing minors with toothbrushes and soap went viral. The federal government lost their appeal when a three-judge panel of the United States Court of Appeals for the Ninth Circuit upheld Judge Gee's order on August 15, 2019.

== Background and lower court cases ==
In 1985, Jenny Lisette Flores, an unaccompanied 15-year-old girl from El Salvador, was apprehended by the Immigration and Naturalization Service (INS) after illegally attempting to cross the Mexico–United States border. The unaccompanied minor was taken to a detention facility where she was held among adults of both sexes, was daily strip searched, and was told she would only be released to the custody of her parents, who, INS suspected, were illegal immigrants.

On July 11, 1985, the Center for Human Rights and Constitutional Law and two other organizations, filed a class action lawsuit Flores v. Meese, No. 85-4544 (C.D. Cal.) on behalf of Flores and "all minors apprehended by the INS in the Western Region of the United States", against U.S. Attorney General Edwin Meese, challenging the conditions of juvenile detention and alleging that the "defendants' policies, practices and regulations regarding the detention and release of unaccompanied minors taken into the custody of the Immigration and Naturalization Service (INS) in the Western Region" were unconstitutional. Lawyers for the plaintiffs said that government's detention and release policies were in violation of the children's rights under the Equal Protection Clause and the Due Process Clause of the United States Constitution. The plaintiffs originally directed their complaint at the newly released policy introduced by then director of Western Region of the Immigration and Naturalization Service (INS), Harold W. Ezell. Under the new policy—83 Fed. Reg. at 45489—which was introduced on September 6, 1984, a detained immigrant minor "could only be released to a parent or legal guardian". This resulted in minors, such as Flores, being detained in poor conditions for "lengthy or indefinite" periods of time.

In late 1987, the C.D. Cal District Court had "approved a consent decree to which all the parties had agreed, "that settled all claims regarding the detention conditions".

In 1988, INS issued a new regulation— 8 CFR 242.24—that amended the 8 Code of Federal Regulations (CFR) parts 212 and 242 regarding the Detention and Release of Juveniles. The new INS regulation, known as 242.24, provided for the "release of detained minors only to their parents, close relatives, or legal guardians, except in unusual and compelling circumstances." The stated purpose of the rule was "to codify the [INS] policy regarding detention and release of juvenile aliens and to provide a single policy for juveniles in both deportation and exclusion proceedings."

On May 25, 1988, soon after the 8 CFR 242.24 regulation took effect, C.D. Cal District Judge Kelleher in Flores v. Meese, No. CV 85-4544-RJK (Px) rejected it and removed limitations regarding which adults could receive the minors. Judge Kelleher held that all minors have the right to receive a hearing from an immigration judge. Judge Kelleher held that 8 CFR 242.24 "violated substantive due process, and ordered modifications to the regulation." He ruled that "INS release and bond procedures for detained minors in deportation proceedings fell short of the requirements of procedural due process." He ordered the INS to provide the minors with an "administrative hearing to determine probable cause for his arrest and the need for any restrictions placed upon his release." The court granted summary judgment to the plaintiffs regarding the release conditions. This "invalidating the regulatory scheme on due process grounds" and ordered the INS to "release any otherwise eligible juvenile to a parent, guardian, custodian, conservator, or "other responsible adult party". The District Court also required that the juvenile have a hearing with an immigration judge immediately after their arrest, even if the juvenile did not request it.

In Flores v. Meese, 681 F. Supp. 665 (C.D. Cal. 1988), U.S. District Judge Robert J. Kelleher found that the INS policy to strip search children was unconstitutional. (Note: Flores v. Meese, 934 F.2d 991, 993 (9th Cir. 1990). According to Flores v. Meese, by 1988, migrant juveniles were detained by INS in the Western region in three sectors, Los Angeles, San Diego, and El Centro.] Particularly in the San Diego sector, these juveniles were routinely strip searched by Border Patrol officers at local Border Patrol stations if the INS makes the decision to detain the juvenile. Attorneys for Flores, said that "the INS policy of routinely strip searching juveniles upon their admission to INS facilities, and after all visits with persons other than their attorneys, violate[d] the Fourth Amendment.")

In June 1990, in Flores v. Meese, 934 F.2d 991 (9th Cir. 1990), in the Ninth Circuit Court of Appeals, Judges John Clifford Wallace and Lloyd D. George, reversed Judge Kelleher's 1988 ruling. Judge Betty Binns Fletcher dissented. In the Ninth Circuit Court of Appeals, the judges concluded that the INS did not exceed its statutory authority in promulgating 242.24. They ruled that 242.24 did not violate substantive due process, under the Federal Constitution's Fifth Amendment. They ruled that a remand was necessary with respect to a procedural due process claim (934 F2d 991).

On August 9, 1991, the Ninth Circuit 11-judge en banc majority in Flores v. Meese, overturned its June 1990 panel opinion and affirmed Judge Kelleher's 1988 ruling against the government citing federal constitutional grounds including due process. (Note: In Flores v. Meese 1991, Judges Wallace, Charles E. Wiggins, Melvin T. Brunetti, and Edward Leavy dissented.) They vacated the panel opinion and affirmed the District Court's order in all respects (942 F2d 1352). (Note: Jenny Lisette Flores, a Minor, by Next Friend Mario Hugh Galvez-Maldonado Dominga Hernandez-Hernandez, a Minor, by Next Friend Jose Saul Mira Alma Yanira Cruz-Aldama, a Minor, by Next Friend Herman Perililo Tanchez v. Edwin Meese, III Immigration & Naturalization Service Harold Ezell, 942 F.2d 1352 (9th Cir. 1991) Court of Appeals for the Ninth Circuit Filed: August 9th, 1991 Precedential Status: Precedential Citations: 942 F.2d 1352 Docket Number: 88-6249 42 F.2d 1352 60 USLW 2125 Jenny Lisette FLORES, a minor, by next friend Mario Hugh GALVEZ-MALDONADO; Dominga Hernandez-Hernandez, a minor, by next friend Jose Saul Mira; Alma Yanira Cruz-Aldama, a minor, by next friend Herman Perililo Tanchez, Plaintiffs-Appellees, v. Edwin MEESE, III; Immigration & Naturalization Service; Harold Ezell, Defendants-Appellants. No. 88-6249. United States Court of Appeals, Ninth Circuit. Argued En Banc and Submitted April 18, 1991. Decided August 9, 1991.) According to Judge Gee's ruling in Flores v. Sessions, the Ninth Circuit affirmed the district court's grant of plaintiffs' motion to enforce [Paragraph 24A of] the Flores Agreement, holding that nothing in the text, structure, or purpose of the Homeland Security Act (HSA) or Victims of Trafficking and Violence Protection Act of 2000 (TVPRA) renders continued compliance with Paragraph 24A, as it applies to unaccompanied minors, "impermissible."

On March 23, 1993, the Supreme Court announced judgment in favor of the government, in Janet Reno, Attorney General, et al. v. Jenny Lisette Flores, et al. Justice Antonin Scalia, joined by Chief Justice William Rehnquist, and Justices Byron White, Sandra Day O'Connor, Anthony Kennedy, David Souter, and Clarence Thomas, held that the unaccompanied alien children had no constitutional right to be released to someone other than a close relative, nor to automatic review by an immigration judge.

On January 17, 1997 both parties signed the class action settlement agreement in Flores v. Reno, The Flores Settlement Agreement (FSA), which is binding on the defendants—the federal government agencies.

== USSC Reno v. Flores 1993 ==
..."Where a juvenile has no available parent, close relative, or legal guardian, where the government does not intend to punish the child, and where the conditions of governmental custody are decent and humane, such custody surely does not violate the Constitution. It is rationally connected to a governmental interest in `preserving and promoting the welfare of the child,' ...and is not punitive since it is not excessive in relation to that valid purpose." ...Because this is a facial challenge, the Court rightly focuses on the Juvenile Care Agreement. It is proper to presume that the conditions of confinement are no longer " `most disturbing,' ...and that the purposes of confinement are no longer the troublesome ones of lack of resources and expertise published in the Federal Register...but rather the plainly legitimate purposes associated with the government's concern for the welfare of the minors. With those presumptions in place, "the terms and conditions of confinement...are in fact compatible with [legitimate] purposes," ...and the Court finds that the INS program conforms with the Due Process Clause."

— 507 U.S. 292 (1993) 1993

In Reno v. Flores, the Supreme Court ruled on March 23, 1993 that while "detained children in question had a constitutionally protected interest in freedom from institutional confinement", the Court reversed the Court of Appeals' 1991 decision in Flores v. Meese because the Immigration and Naturalization Service (INS) regulation 8 CFR 242.24 in question, complied with the requirements of due process. The INS regulation—8 CFR 242.24—"generally authorized the release of a detained alien juvenile, in order of preference, to a parent, a legal guardian, or specified close adult relatives of the juvenile, unless the INS determined that detention was required to secure an appearance or to ensure the safety of the juvenile or others". This "meant that in limited circumstances" juveniles could be released "to another person who executed an agreement to care for the juvenile and to ensure the juvenile's attendance at future immigration proceedings". Juveniles who are not released would "generally require" a "suitable placement at a facility which, in accordance with the [1987] consent decree, had to meet specified care standards." (Note: This reference includes the March 23, 1993 Concurrence, Syllabus, Dissent, and Opinion.) (Note: The Court noted that Reno v. Flore is a "facial challenge to INS regulation 242.24" because the policy has never been applied "in a particular instance". The District Court invalidated 242.24 a week after it came into effect. When the original lawsuit was filed in 1985, it was directed against the newly released policy introduced in —83 Fed. Reg. at 45489—which was introduced on September 6, 1984 by then director of Western Region of the Immigration and Naturalization Service (INS), Harold W. Ezell. Under 83 Fed. Reg. at 45489, a detained immigrant minor "could only be released to a parent or legal guardian". This resulted in minors, such as Flores, being detained in poor conditions for "lengthy or indefinite" periods of time. The Supreme Court said that "We have before us no findings of fact, indeed no record, concerning the INS's interpretation of the regulation or the history of its enforcement. We have only the regulation itself and the statement of basis and purpose that accompanied its promulgation. To prevail in such a facial challenge, respondents "must establish that no set of circumstances exists under which the [regulation] would be valid.")

On March 23, 1993, on certiorari the Supreme Court ruled in favor of the government, voting 7–2 to reverse the lower court—the Court of Appeals. Justice Antonin Scalia, joined by Chief Justice William Rehnquist, and Justices Byron White, Sandra Day O'Connor, Anthony Kennedy, David Souter, and Clarence Thomas, held that the unaccompanied alien children had no constitutional right to be released to someone other than a close relative, nor to automatic review by an immigration judge. In an opinion by Scalia, joined by Rehnquist, White, O'Connor, Kennedy, Souter, and Thomas, it was held that the INS policy—242.24—did not violate substantive due process under the Fifth Amendment. While lawyers for the plaintiffs alleged in a "novel" way that children have a fundamental right to liberty, in which a child who has "no available parent, close relative, or legal guardian, and for whom the government was responsible" has the right "to be placed in the custody of a willing and able private custodian rather than the custody of a government-operated or government-selected child care institution." The Court ruled that if that fundamental right existed, "it would presumably apply to state custody over orphaned and abandoned children as well." They ruled that "under the circumstances" "continued government custody was rationally connected to a government interest in promoting juveniles' welfare and was not punitive" and that "there was no constitutional need to meet even a more limited demand for an individualized hearing as to whether private placement would be in a juvenile's "best interests," so long as institutional custody was good enough." The Court held that the INS "did not violate procedural due process, under the Fifth Amendment, through failing to require the INS to determine in the case of each alien juvenile that detention in INS custody would better serve the juvenile's interests than release to some other "responsible adult," not providing for automatic review by an immigration judge of initial INS deportability and custody determinations, or failing to set a time period within which an immigration judge hearing, if requested, had to be held." The Court also held that this was not "beyond the scope of the Attorney General's discretion" because the INS 242.24 "rationally pursued the lawful purpose of protecting the welfare of such juveniles." (Note: The case began with oral arguments on October 13, 1992. Deputy Solicitor General Maureen Mahoney appeared for the government.) (Note: The March 23, 1993 syllabus for the USSC case Reno v. Flores said that the respondents in Reno v. Meese, are a "class of alien juveniles arrested by the Immigration and Naturalization Service (INS) on suspicion of being deportable.") It held that the juveniles could be "detained pending deportation hearings pursuant" under 8 CFR § 242.24 which "provides for the release of detained minors only to their parents, close relatives, or legal guardians, except in unusual and compelling circumstances."

The Supreme Court justices said that in Reno v. Flores, most of the juveniles detained by INS and the Border Patrol at that time [1980s - early 1990s] were "16 or 17 years old", and had "telephone contact with a responsible adult outside the INS--sometimes a legal services attorney". They said that due process was "satisfied by giving the detained alien juveniles the right to a hearing before an immigration judge" and that there was no proof at that time "that all of them are too young or too ignorant to exercise that right when the form asking them to assert or waive it is presented."

Justice Stevens, joined by Justice Blackmun, dissented, expressing the view that the litigation history of the case at hand cast doubt on the good faith of the government's asserted interest in the welfare of such detained alien juveniles as a justification for 242.24, and demonstrated the complete lack of support, in either evidence or experience, for the government's contention that detaining such juveniles, when there were "other responsible parties" willing to assume care, somehow protected the interests of those juveniles; an agency's interest in minimizing administrative costs was a patently inadequate justification for the detention of harmless children, even when the conditions of detention were "good enough"; and 242.24, in providing for the wholesale detention of such juveniles for an indeterminate period without individual hearings, was not authorized by 1252(a)(1), and did not satisfy the federal constitutional demands of due process.

== Flores Settlement Agreement ==
On January 28, 1997, during the administration of President Bill Clinton, the Center for Human Rights and Constitutional Law (CHRCL) and the federal government signed the Flores v. Reno Settlement Agreement, which is also known as The Flores Settlement Agreement (FSA), Flores Settlement, Flores v. Reno Agreement. Following many years of litigation which started with the July 11, 1985 filing of class action lawsuit, Flores v. Meese, and included the Supreme Court case Reno v. Flores which was decided in 1993, the consent decree or settlement was reached in the United States District Court for the Central District of California between the parties. The court-supervised settlement, The Flores Settlement Agreement (FSA), continues to overseen by the District Court for the Central District of California. The Flores Agreement has set strict national regulations and standards regarding the detention and treatment of minors in federal custody since then. Among other things, the federal government agreed to keep children in the least restrictive setting possible and to ensure the prompt release of children from immigration detention.

According to September 17, 2018 Congressional Research Service (CRS) report, the FSA was "intended as a temporary measure". By 2001, both parties agreed that the FSA "would remain in effect until 45 days following [the] defendants' publication of final regulations" governing the treatment of detained, minors." By 2019, the federal government had "not published any such rules or regulations" so the FSA "continues to govern those agencies that now carry out the functions of the former INS." With the Flores Settlement in place, the executive branch maintains that it has two options regarding the detention of arriving family units that demonstrate a credible fear of persecution pending the outcome of their removal proceedings in immigration court: (1) generally release family units; or (2) generally separate family units by keeping the parents in detention and releasing the children only.

The Flores Agreement sets nationwide policies and "standards for the detention, release and treatment of minors in the custody of the Immigration and Naturalization Service (INS) by prioritizing them for release to the custody of their families and requiring those in federal custody to be placed in the least restrictive environment possible," according to a 2018 NBC News article.

According to the legal nonprofit Human Rights First, the FSA required that immigration authorities "release children from immigration detention without unnecessary delay in order of preference beginning with parents and including other adult relatives as well as licensed programs willing to accept custody". If a suitable placement is not "immediately available, the government is obligated to place children in the "least restrictive" setting appropriate to their "age and any special needs". The settlement agreement also required that the government "implement standards relating to the care and treatment of children in immigration detention.

The FSA required immigration officials to provide detained minors with "food and drinking water as appropriate", "medical assistance if minor is in need of emergency services", "toilets and sinks", "adequate temperature control and ventilation", "adequate supervision to protect minors from others", "contact with family members who were arrested with the minor and separation from unrelated adults whenever possible."

Under the settlement agreement, immigration officials agreed to release minors "without unnecessary delay" when detention isn't required to protect the safety and well-being of the minor or to secure the timely appearance of the minor at a proceeding before immigration authorities, that is, when officials release the minor to a parent or guardian who agree to appear, and the minor is not a flight risk.

The FSA set a "preference ranking for sponsor types" with parents, then legal guardians as first choices then an "adult relative", an "adult individual or entity designated by the child's parent or legal guardian", a "licensed program willing to accept legal custody", an "adult or entity approved" by Office of Refugee Resettlement (ORR). or sent to a state-licensed facility.

Immigration officials agreed to provide minors with contact with family members with whom they were arrested, and to "promptly" reunite minors with their families. Efforts to reunify families are to continue as long as the minor is in custody. (Note: According to Snopes, there is "no federal law mandating children and parents be separated at the border; a policy resulting in that outcome was enacted in May 2018.")

The Flores settlement does, however, require that "Following arrest, the INS shall hold minors in facilities that are safe and sanitary and that are consistent with the INS's concern for the particular vulnerability of minors" and "...such minor shall be placed temporarily in a licensed program ... at least until such time as release can be effected ... Or until the minor's immigration proceedings are concluded, whichever occurs earlier".

=== Subsequent history ===
The parties agreed the litigation would terminate once the government finalized regulations complying with the settlement. Because the government has not yet finalized any such regulations, the litigation is ongoing. Compliance with the settlement has been the subject of criticism and litigation, resulting in extensions and modifications. In 2001 the United States Department of Justice Office of the Inspector General concluded "Although the INS has made significant progress since signing the Flores agreement, our review found deficiencies with the implementation of the policies and procedures developed in response to Flores."

In November 2002, President George W. Bush signed into law the Homeland Security Act, which abolished the INS and removed responsibility for unaccompanied alien minors from the Justice Department. The new United States Department of Homeland Security was given responsibility for the apprehension, transfer, and repatriation of illegal aliens while the Office of Refugee Resettlement inside the United States Department of Health and Human Services was given responsibility for the unaccompanied alien minors' care, placement, and reunification with their parents. In 2005 the Bush administration launched Operation Streamline, which referred all illegal immigrants for prosecution, but exempted those traveling with children.

In 2008, President Bush signed into law the William Wilberforce Trafficking Victims Protection Reauthorization Act, a reauthorization of the Victims of Trafficking and Violence Protection Act of 2000, which codified some of the standards in the Flores Agreement. The Act provided for the expedited repatriation of unaccompanied alien minors to contiguous nations Mexico and Canada, while exempting unaccompanied children from El Salvador, Guatemala and Honduras from expedited repatriation in order to provide some protection to victims of human trafficking.

Attempting to comply with the Agreement while keeping families together and coping with the 2014 American immigration crisis, a surge of refugees fleeing violence in Central America, the Department of Homeland Security under President Barack Obama built family detention centers in Pennsylvania and Texas.

On July 24, 2015, in Flores v. Johnson 2015 C.D. Cal., District Judge Dolly M. Gee ruled found that the consent decree applied equally to accompanied and unaccompanied minors and that immigration officials violated the consent decree by refusing to release accompanied minors held in a family detention facility. The government said an average of 20 days was required for adjudication of "credible fear" and "reasonable fear" claims, among the grounds for asylum in the United States, and on August 21, 2015 Judge Gee clarified the "without unnecessary delay" and "promptly" language in the Flores settlement, ruling that holding parents and children for up to 20 days "may fall within the parameters" of the settlement. Judge Gee ruled that detained children and their parents who were caught crossing the border illegally could not be held more than 20 days, saying that detention centers in Texas, such as the GEO Group's privately run Karnes County Residential Center (KCRC) in Karnes City, Texas, and the T. Don Hutto Residential Center, in Taylor, Texas, had failed to meet Flores standards. Gee expanded Flores to cover accompanied and unaccompanied children. Judge Gee ruled that Flores calls on the government to release children "without unnecessary delay", which she held was within 20 days. The court ordered the release of 1700 families that were not flight risks.

This was a major change to Flores. Gee was an Obama-appointed federal district court judge. Judge Gee said that the defendants' "blanket no-release policy with respect to minors accompanied by their mothers is a material breach of the Agreement."

In 2016, in Flores v. Lynch, Ninth Circuit Judge Andrew Hurwitz, joined by Judges Michael J. Melloy and Ronald M. Gould, reversed in part, finding that the Agreement applied to all detained children but that it did not give their parents any affirmative right of release.

District Judge Gee next issued an enforcement order against the government and, on July 5, 2017, in Flores v. Sessions, Ninth Circuit Judge Stephen Reinhardt, joined by Judges A. Wallace Tashima, and Marsha Berzon, affirmed, finding that Congress had not abrogated the Agreement through subsequent legislation. Judge Gee ruled that "Congress did not terminate Paragraph 24A of the Flores Settlement with respect to bond hearings for unaccompanied minors" by "[e]nacting the Homeland Security Act (HSA) and the Trafficking Victims Protection Reauthorization Act (TVPRA)." Judge Gee said that the Flores v. Sessions appeal had stemmed from the Flores Settlement Agreement "between the plaintiff class and the federal government that established a nationwide policy for the detention, release, and treatment of minors in the custody of the INS" and that Paragraph 24A of the Flores Agreement provides that a "minor in deportation proceedings shall be afforded a bond redetermination hearing before an immigration judge." The Ninth Circuit affirmed Judge Gee's motion to enforce the Flores Agreement, saying that there was "nothing in the text, structure, or purpose of the HSA or TVPRA" that rendered "continued compliance with Paragraph 24A, as it applies to unaccompanied minors, "impermissible." Because of the ruling in Flores v. Sessions, ORR is required to "inform all unaccompanied children in staff-secure and secure placements of their right to a bond hearing, and schedule one if requested."

In her July 2017 ruling, U.S. District Judge Dolly Gee found that children who were in custody of the U.S. Customs and Border Protection were sleep-deprived because of inadequate conditions and that their food and water was inadequate, and they lacked "basic hygiene items" which was in violation of the Flores Settlement Agreement. She ordered to federal government to provide an itemized list and improve the conditions. The federal government appealed the decision saying that 1997 Flores Agreement did not mention "allowing children to sleep or wash themselves with soap".

"Assuring that children eat enough edible food, drink clean water, are housed in hygienic facilities with sanitary bathrooms, have soap and toothpaste, and are not sleep-deprived are without doubt essential to the children's safety."

— Judge Marsha S. Berzon. August 15, 2019. 9th U.S. Circuit Court of Appeals

In June 2019, three judges of the Ninth Circuit court of appeals heard the case, 17-56297 Jenny Flores v. William Barr, in which Sarah Fabian, the senior attorney in the Department of Justice's Office of Immigration Litigation requested the Court to overturn Judge Gee's 2017 order "requiring the government to provide detainees with hygiene items such as soap and toothbrushes in order to comply with the "safe and sanitary conditions" requirement set forth in Flores Settlement. During the June 20, 2019 proceedings, Ninth Circuit Judge William Fletcher said it was "inconceivable" that the United States government would consider it "safe and sanitary" to detain child migrants in conditions where it was "cold all night long, lights on all night long, sleeping on concrete and you've got an aluminium foil blanket?" Fabian said that the Flores agreement mandating "safe and sanitary" conditions for detained migrant children was "vague" which let the federal agencies determine "sanitation protocols." It was not compulsory for the government to provide toothbrushes, soap or adequate bedding to the minors in their care. Videos of the hearing were widely circulated on social media. One of the justices, Judge A. Wallace Tashima, was detained in an internment camp as a child. According to the Los Angeles Times, the "case stirred nationwide outrage" when videos of the hearing went viral.

On August 15, 2019 the three-judge panel of the federal 9th U.S. Circuit Court of Appeals upheld Judge Gee's 2017 "order requiring immigration authorities to provide minors with adequate food, water, bedding, toothbrushes and soap."

=== Trump administration family separation policy ===
As Presidential candidate, Donald Trump had promised to end what he called the Obama administration's policy of "catch and release". It was the second of his top priorities for immigration reform, after walling off Mexico. In the first 15 months of the administration of President Trump, nearly 100,000 immigrants apprehended at the United States-Mexico border were released, including more than 37,000 unaccompanied minors and 61,000 family members, compared to the 2,362,966 adults from 2010-2016 of Obama's tenure that were "apprehended at the southern border, 492,970, or 21 percent, [of whom] were referred for prosecution."

On May 26, 2018 Trump tweeted, "Put pressure on the Democrats to end the horrible law that separates children from there [sic] parents once they cross the border into the U.S." On May 29, 2018 White House senior policy advisor Stephen Miller told reporters, "A nation cannot have a principle that there will be no civil or criminal immigration enforcement for somebody traveling with a child. The current immigration and border crisis, and all of the attendant concerns it raises, are the exclusive product of loopholes that Democrats refuse to close," such as the Flores Settlement Agreement and the William Wilberforce Trafficking Victims Protection Reauthorization Act of 2008.

By June 2018, the Flores Agreement received increased public attention when Trump, his administration, and supporters cited the FSA and Democratic recalcitrance as justification for the Trump administration family separation policy, in which all adults detained at the U.S.–Mexico border were prosecuted and sent to federal jails while children and infants were placed under the supervision of the U.S. Department of Health and Human Services (DHHS). In June 2018 Vox Media summarized the administration's interpretation of the settlement as since the government "cannot keep parents and children in immigration detention together, it has no choice but to detain parents in immigration detention (after they've been criminally prosecuted for illegal entry) and send the children to" DHS as "unaccompanied alien children." Despite the wording of Flores v. Reno, human rights advocates asserted that no law or court order mandated the separation of children from their families. On June 11, 2018 Republican Senator from Texas Ted Cruz said in a Dallas public radio interview "There's a court order that prevents keeping the kids with the parents when you put the parents in jail." PolitiFact fact-checked Cruz's statement, concluding it was "mostly false." On June 14, 2018, White House press secretary Sarah Huckabee Sanders told reporters, "The separation of illegal alien families is the product of the same legal loopholes that Democrats refuse to close. And these laws are the same that have been on the books for over a decade. The president is simply enforcing them," Republican Representative from Wisconsin and Speaker of the House Paul Ryan told reporters "What's happening at the border in the separation of parents and their children is because of a court ruling," and Republican Senator from Iowa Chuck Grassley tweeted "I want 2 stop the separation of families at the border by repealing the Flores 1997 court decision requiring separation of families." The New York Times said "there is no decades-old law or court decision that requires" separating migrant children from their parents.

On June 19, 2018 White House Legislative Affairs Director Marc Short told reporters the Trump administration had sought legislative relief from Congress on the Flores Settlement, saying "In each and every one of our negotiations in the last 18 months, all the immigration bills, we asked for resolution on the Flores settlement that is what we view requires 20 days before you have to release children and basically parents been released with children into society." According to the Congressional Research Service (CRS) report, President Trump's June 20, 2018 executive order, had directed then-United States Attorney General Jeff Sessions to ask the Judge Dolly M. Gee of District Court for the Central District of California in Los Angeles, which oversees the Flores Agreement Settlement, to "modify the agreement" to "allow the government to detain alien families together throughout the duration of the family's immigration proceedings as well as the pendency of any criminal proceedings for unlawful entry into the United States. The executive order reversed the family separation policy, directing the United States Armed Forces to make room available on military bases for family detention and requested that the District Court for the Central District of California be flexible on the provisions of the settlement requiring state licensing of family detention centers and limiting detention of immigrant children to 20 days, in order to detain families for the duration of their immigration court proceedings. On July 9, 2018, Gee rejected the request, citing that there was no basis to modify the agreement and pointing out that it is an issue the legislative branch has to solve instead.

On September 7, 2018 federal agencies published a notice of proposed rulemaking that would terminate the FSA "so that ICE may use appropriate facilities to detain family units together during their immigration proceedings, consistent with applicable law."

On August 23, 2019, the administration issued a rule allowing families to be held in humane conditions while their U.S. immigration court cases were decided. On September 27, Judge Gee blocked the rule, stating: "This regulation is inconsistent with one of the primary goals of the Flores Agreement, which is to instate a general policy favoring release and expeditiously place minors 'in the least restrictive setting appropriate to the minor's age and special needs'".

== See also ==
- List of United States Supreme Court cases, volume 507
- Unaccompanied Alien Children
