= Office of Refugee Resettlement =

US Department of Human Services program

Administration/Office overview
- Jurisdiction: Federal government of the United States
- Headquarters: Mary E. Switzer Memorial Building; Washington, D.C., United States; 38.885871°N 77.016536°W
- Administration/Office executive: Angie Salazar, Interim Director
- Parent department: Administration for Children and Families, U.S. Department of Health and Human Services
- Website: www.acf.hhs.gov/orr

The Office of Refugee Resettlement (ORR) is a program of the Administration for Children and Families, an office within the United States Department of Health and Human Services, created with the passing of the United States Refugee Act of 1980 (Public Law 96-212). The Office of Refugee Resettlement offers support for refugees seeking safe haven within the United States, including victims of human trafficking, those seeking asylum from persecution, survivors of torture and war, and unaccompanied alien children. The mission and purpose of the Office of Refugee Resettlement is to assist in the relocation process and provide needed services to individuals granted asylum within the United States.

Since 1975, the United States has assisted in the resettlement of more than 3 million refugees. Annual admissions of refugees to the United States since the 1980 Refugee Act was enacted have ranged from 27,100 to as many as 207,116.

In Fiscal Year 2019, Refugee and Resettlement Assistance comprised a discretionary budget of $1.905 billion. The largest share of that, $1.303 billion, was designated for the Unaccompanied Alien Children program housing child migrants. Other major programs include Transitional and Medical Services, $354 million; Refugee Support Services, $207 million; and the Trafficking Victims Support Program, $27 million.

The Office of Refugee Resettlement is currently headed by Interim Director Angie Salazar.

== History ==
Before World War II, nonprofit voluntary agencies called "Volags" were generally responsible for aiding immigrants and refugees. In 1946, the U.S. federal government began supporting these organizations financially with the Corporate Affidavit Program. However, beginning with an influx of refugees fleeing Castro's Cuba, the federal government began to take the primary financial role in assisting refugees. This response set a precedent of federal involvement, with Eisenhower and Kennedy expanding efforts to assist nonprofits in settling refugees—efforts which became permanent with the Migration and Refugee Assistance Act of 1962.

The Office of Refugee Resettlement was officially established with the passage of the Refugee Act of 1980. It was created in "an attempt to design a coherent and comprehensive refugee admission and resettlement policy". The act (a) gave recognition to the Office of the U.S. Coordinator for Refugee Affairs, which was given authority over the development of U.S. “refugee admission and resettlement policy”, and (b) established the Office of Refugee Resettlement (ORR) within the U.S. Department of Health and Human Services, which was given the authority to provide grants with nonprofits for resettlement services (including training and healthcare), and reimbursed states for efforts undertaken within the first three years of a refugee's living in the United States.

In its goal of allowing the United States to respond quickly and efficiently to the needs of refugees, the Refugee Act of 1980 also established a new appointed office, the U.S. Coordinator for Refugee Affairs, who is appointed by the President and consults with the ORR.

== Major changes ==
In 2000, additional categories of potential recipients of ORR services were added including persons granted asylum, survivors of torture, unaccompanied alien children and certified adult victims of human trafficking. The Trafficking Victims Protection Reauthorization Act of 2008 added trafficked children to the list of individuals qualified for services.

The Unaccompanied Alien Children program was transferred to ORR by the Homeland Security Act of 2002, effective on March 1, 2003. The Office' work was subject to the provisions of the Flores Agreement in 1997, the Trafficking Victims Protection Act of 2000 and its reauthorization acts, the William Wilberforce Trafficking Victims Protection Reauthorization Act (TVPRA) of 2005 and 2008.

In 2010, the ORR reported to the U.S. Congress six guiding principles which represented a modification of its priorities:

- Appropriation placement and services
- Client-centered case management
- Newly arriving refugees
- Health and mental health services
- Outreach
- Data-informed decision-making

Additionally, the ORR reshaped its vision: “to assist refugees with accessing mainstream opportunities and resources”.

== Leadership ==
As of September 2025, the current director of ORR is Angie Salazar. The Office of the Director also includes the ORR Deputy Director who oversees ORR's refugee program, and the ORR Deputy Director for Children's Services who oversees ORR's unaccompanied alien children program.

The ORR has eight major divisions at the federal level, each with a director and support staff:

1. Division of Policy & Procedures
2. Division of Budget & Data Analysis
3. Division of Refugee Assistance
4. Division of Refugee Health
5. Division of Refugee Services
6. Division of Unaccompanied Children Operations
7. Division of Planning and Logistics
8. Division of Health for Unaccompanied Children

== Service delivery ==
Service delivery to refugees varies based on the division providing services and the program being performed. For example, the Division of Resettlement Services works through private nonprofit and public organizations to provide economic support and social integration services to refugees. This particular division “administers the Voluntary Agency Match Grant Program and seven competitive refugee social services discretionary grant programs. Discretionary grants are awarded on a competitive basis".

== Funding ==
The ORR receives an appropriation from Congress each year with some specifications on allotments for each division, and divides the allotment among its programs. These programs then appropriate the money to their partnering agencies in the form of grants, following specified formula guidelines. States ultimately hold the responsibility for carrying out the ORR's mission:

“Federal resettlement assistance to refugees is provided primarily through the state-administered refugee resettlement program. States provide transitional cash and medical assistance and social services, as well as maintain legal responsibility for the care of unaccompanied refugee children." The ORR uses a matching grant program to provide funding for its affiliate voluntary agencies. These voluntary agencies are then expected to operate the program through their national networks. The ORR “awards $2 for every $1 raised by the agency up to a maximum of $2,500 in Federal funds per enrollee. Note that while federal and match funds are calculated on a per capita or client basis, the actual spending of such funds is not per capita based."

== Partnerships ==
The ORR partners with several federal agencies, including the Department of Health and Human Services, the Department of Homeland Security, the Department of Justice, and the Department of State.

Within the Department of Health and Human Services the ORR partners with the Office for Civil Rights, the Centers for Disease Control, the Office of Head Start, the Substance Abuse and Mental Health Services Administration, and the U.S. Administration on Aging. Within the Department of Homeland Security it partners with U.S. Customs and Border Protection, U.S. Immigration and Customs Enforcement, and U.S. Citizenship and Immigration Services. Within the Department of Justice, it partners with the Executive Office of Immigration Review. Lastly, within the Department of State it partners with the Bureau of Population, Refugees, and Migration.
