= Casa San Diego =

Immigrant holding facility in El Cajon, California, US

Location of El Cajon in San Diego County

Casa San Diego is a holding facility located in El Cajon, California, for minors who are either unaccompanied at the United States border or who have been separated from their families. Currently, around 10 percent of children housed in Casa San Diego were separated from their parents on entry at the border. Casa San Diego currently houses boys and girls between the ages of 6 and 17.

== About ==
The facility of Casa San Diego is run by Southwest Key Programs and located in El Cajon, California. It is under 24-hour video surveillance and has an alarm that sounds when unauthorized individuals open the front door. There are classrooms, a recreation area and a medical clinic. The entire facility is fenced in with privacy netting.

Minors held at the facility remain there for an average 45 days while they wait for the Department of Health and Human Services to place them into foster custody, with family members or to be deported to their home country.

== See also ==
- Immigration detention in the United States
