= Casa Padre =

Detention facility in Brownsville, Texas, U.S.

- Interactive map of Casa Padre
- Location: 3449,7480 Padre Island Hwy, Brownsville, Texas, U.S.; 25°56′33.6″N 97°25′26.2″W
- Status: Closed
- Opened: March 2017

Casa Padre is a shelter for unaccompanied or separated immigrant minors in custody of the U.S. Office of Refugee Resettlement, a division of Health & Human Services, located in Brownsville, Texas. The site opened in March 2017, and is still housing children in 2022. The building was formerly a Walmart store. The center is run by the nonprofit group Southwest Key Programs under contract from the federal government. Casa Padre is the largest licensed childcare facility in the United States, housing approximately 1,500 youths. The former Walmart store houses boys ranging from ages 10 to 17. According to the Internal Revenue Service, the group houses approximately 5,129 immigrant children in the United States, approximately 4 percent of the unaccompanied minors in the United States today.

== Reaction ==
On June 3, 2018, Oregon Senator Jeff Merkley was denied entrance to the Casa Padre facility as part of his investigation into the living conditions of the children. After he was denied entry into the facility by the police, he stated that "Americans should be outraged by the fact that our taxpayer dollars are being used to inflict spiteful and traumatizing policies onto innocent minors." The recorded exchange between Merkley and the employees of the facility was uploaded to YouTube and was shared 1.1 million times.

Then-House Minority Leader Nancy Pelosi condemned both the detention facility and the Trump Administration's controversial immigration policies, stating, "This is barbaric. This is not what America is. But this is the policy of the Trump administration." Then-Speaker of the House Paul Ryan stated his disapproval of the Trump Administration's policy towards separating children from their parents. Senator James Lankford of Oklahoma tweeted, "I am asking the White House to keep families together as much as we can."

== See also ==
- List of immigrant detention sites in the United States
- Immigration detention in the United States
- Trump administration family separation policy
