= Ursula (detention center) =

Detention facility

Coordinates: 26.1590°N 98.2703°W

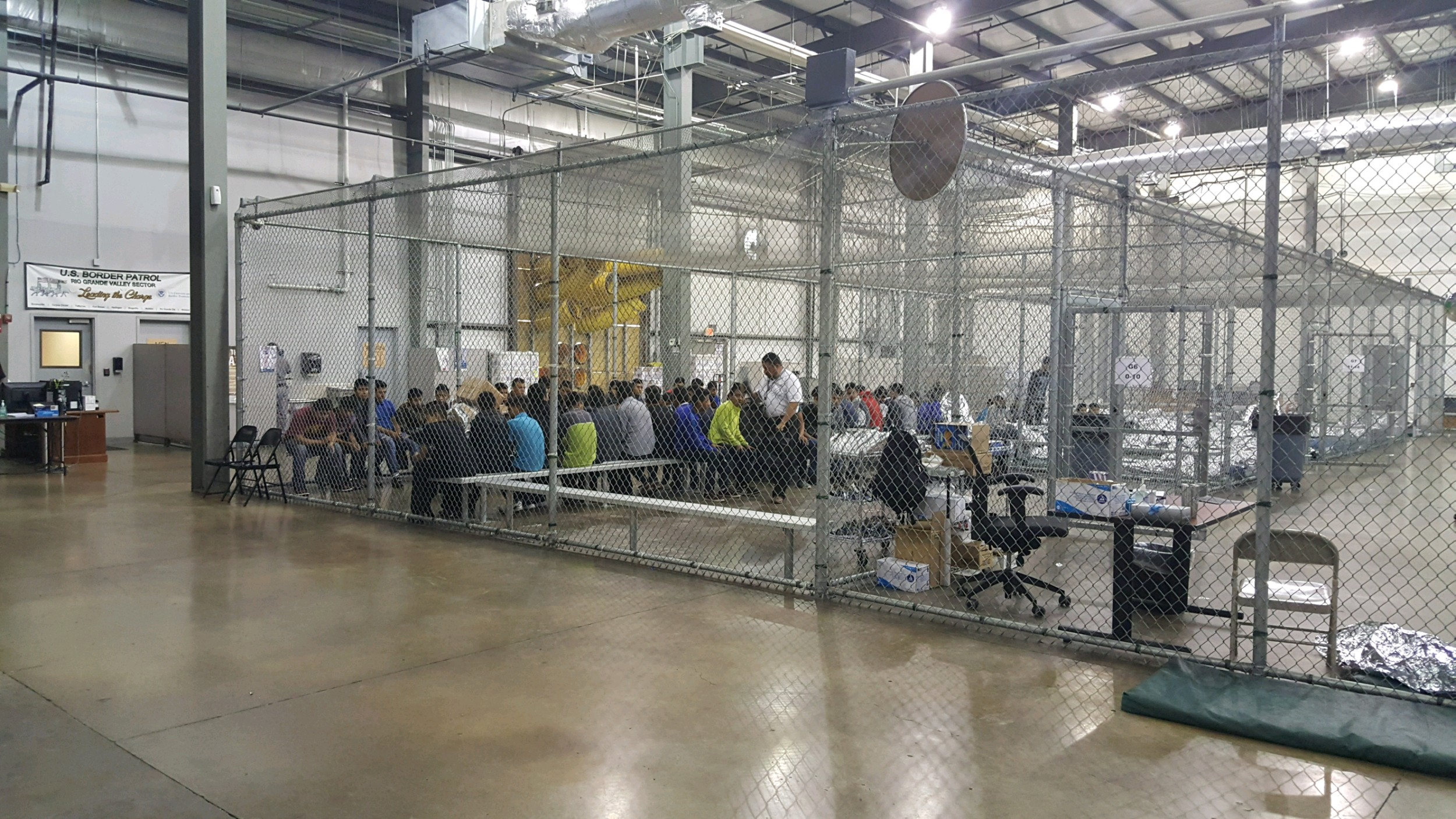
Separated family members detained in cages

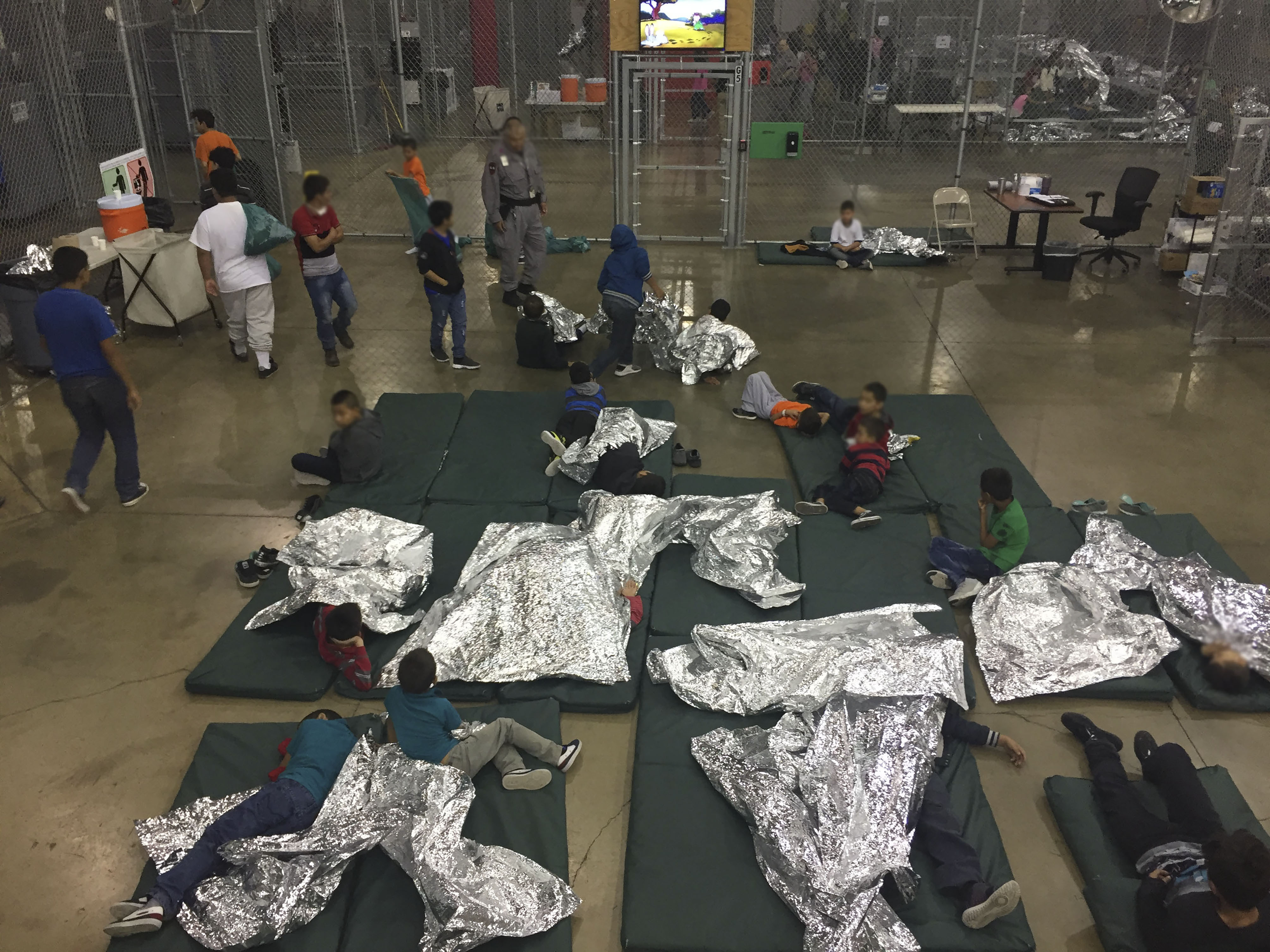
Detained children lying on mattresses within a caged area

'Imagery from the Central Processing Center in McAllen, TX' - video from U.S. Customs and Border Protection Office of Public Affairs - Visual Communications Division

Photos provided by Customs and Border Protection to reporter on tour of Ursula detention facility in McAllen, Texas. Reporters were not allowed to take their own photos.

Ursula is the colloquial name for the Central Processing Center, the largest U.S. Customs and Border Protection detention center for undocumented immigrants. The facility is a retrofitted warehouse that can hold more than 1,000 people. It was opened in 2014 on W. Ursula Avenue in McAllen, Texas. In June 2018, it gained notoriety for the practice of keeping children in large cages made of chain-link fencing.

== About ==
The center, better known as "Ursula," is the largest immigration processing and detention center run by the Border Patrol and the Customs and Border Protection Agency. The detention and processing center was opened in 2014 at 3700 W. Ursula Avenue in McAllen, Texas. The facility is made from a former warehouse which was leased by the federal government and modified to be able to hold 1,000 children. Children were kept in cages made of chain-link fencing inside of the 77,000 square-foot warehouse.

Minors who arrive at the Mexico–United States border unaccompanied or who have been separated from their families are supposed to only stay in this type of processing center for under 72 hours. After processing, minors are sent to facilities run by the Department of Health and Human Services. The facility also houses adults and individuals are separated based on how they crossed into the United States.

Filming or photography is not allowed inside of the facility. During the weekend of June 16, 2018, reporters were allowed to tour the facility (without cameras).

ABC News reported in June 2019 that Dolly Lucio Sevier, a board-certified doctor, visited Ursula after a flu outbreak at the facility that resulted in five infants requiring to enter a neonatal intensive care unit. Sevier wrote that a medical declaration that the "conditions within which [the migrant minors] are held could be compared to torture facilities ... extreme cold temperatures, lights on 24 hours a day, no adequate access to medical care, basic sanitation, water, or adequate food." All of the 39 children she assessed showed signs of trauma.

== See also ==
- Immigration detention in the United States
