= Immigration policy of the first Trump administration =

Immigration policy, including illegal immigration to the United States, was a signature issue of Donald Trump's 2016 presidential campaign, and his proposed reforms and remarks about this issue generated much publicity. Trump has repeatedly said that illegal immigrants are criminals.

A hallmark and false promise of his campaign was to build a substantial wall on the United States–Mexico border and to force Mexico to pay for the wall. Trump has also expressed support for a variety of "limits on legal immigration and guest-worker visas", including a "pause" on granting green cards, which Trump says will "allow record immigration levels to subside to more moderate historical averages". Trump's proposals regarding H-1B visas frequently changed throughout his presidential campaign, but as of late July 2016, he appeared to oppose the H-1B visa program.

As president, on January 27, 2017, Trump issued an executive order banning the admission of travelers, immigrants, and refugees from seven Muslim-majority nations, which later expanded to thirteen in 2020. In response to legal challenges he revised the ban twice, with his third version being upheld by the Supreme Court in June 2018. He attempted to end the Deferred Action for Childhood Arrivals program, but a legal injunction has allowed the policy to continue while the matter is the subject of legal challenge. He imposed a "zero tolerance" policy to require the arrest of anyone caught illegally crossing the border. The "zero tolerance" policy was reversed in June 2018, but multiple media reports of continued family separations were published in the first half of 2019.

In his first State of the Union address on January 30, 2018, Trump outlined his administration's four pillars for immigration reform: (1) a path to citizenship for DREAMers; (2) increased border security funding; (3) ending the diversity visa lottery; and (4) restrictions on family-based immigration. In the August 2022 issue of The Atlantic, the cover story wrote that if the architects of the family separation return to power they "will likely seek to reinstate it."

== Background in business practices ==
In March 2016, Trump addressed E-Verify, an online tool provided by the American government to detect if business employees are unauthorized aliens. Trump declared: "I'm using E-Verify on just about every job ... I'll tell you, it works." In December 2018, The Washington Times reported that in the 565 companies that President Trump had a financial stake in as disclosed in May 2018, only 5 companies (less than 1%) used E-Verify. In January 2019, Trump's son, Eric Trump, said that The Trump Organization was now "instituting E-Verify on all of our properties as soon as possible".

In August 2016, according to Time magazine, just-unsealed court documents from 1990 showed testimony and sworn depositions revealing that in 1979 and 1980, Trump had personally met with illegal Polish immigrant workers at their jobs, having beforehand instructed for them to be hired through a new company in order to employ them to demolish a building to make way for the Trump Tower in Manhattan. Trump had later toured the demolition site multiple times. The workers did 12-hour shifts, some worked 24-hour shifts, and all were paid between $4.00 and $5.00 per hour—less than half the stipulated union wage at the time. The workers testified to the fact that most of them had not used safety equipment like hard hats. When a dispute over workers not being paid had occurred, Trump had personally met some of the workers and had agreed to pay them directly, according to testimony. Trump's payments had been inconsistent and had led to further disputes with the workers. Daniel Sullivan, a labor consultant, testified that Trump in June 1980 asked Sullivan for advice pertaining to the fact that "he had some illegal Polish employees on the job". Although not part of his official testimony, Sullivan later said that the Polish workers had been receiving "starvation wages". John Szabo, the lawyer for the Polish workers, testified that in August 1980 he had received a call from Trump's lawyer Irwin Durben, who had told him that Trump had been threatening to have the Polish workers deported. In 1998, after a 15-year legal battle over whether Trump had neglected to pay his due amount into a union fund for the Polish workers, Trump settled the case only when a jury trial pertaining to whether he was the legal employer of the Polish workers had become imminent. Between 1980 and 2016, Trump repeatedly denied that he had known that the Polish workers had been illegal immigrants.

In November 2017, more court documents regarding the above situation of the Polish workers were unsealed. They showed that a crew of 200 Polish workers had worked on the demolition, and that Trump had ultimately paid a settlement of $1.375 million, including $0.5 million to the union fund, after appealing a judge's ruling that he was indeed the legal employer of the Polish workers.

In July 2017, Trump's Mar-a-Lago Club applied for visas to hire foreign workers – 15 housekeepers, 20 cooks and 35 servers from October 2017 to May 2018. Trump National Golf Club in Jupiter, Florida did the same for 6 cooks.

In December 2018, The New York Times reported that two illegal immigrants had worked for the Trump National Golf Club in Bedminster, New Jersey as housekeepers. Sandra Diaz, from Costa Rica, worked there from 2010 to 2013, and later became a legal American resident. Diaz said that she had washed and ironed Trump's clothes. Victorina Morales worked there from 2013, and said that she had personally made Trump's bed and cleaned his toilet, with an hourly wage from $10 to $13. Diaz recounted Trump personally tipping her $100, while Morales said Trump tipped her $50 after she told him she was from Guatemala. Diaz and Morales said that at least two of their supervisors knew that they were illegal immigrants, and that there were "many people without papers" who were hired. Anibal Romero, a lawyer for Morales, said that in November 2018, he was contacted by the New Jersey Attorney General's Office and the Federal Bureau of Investigation, both of which were investigating the Trump National Golf Club's possible hiring of unauthorized immigrants with fraudulent documentation.

In January 2019, the Trump National Golf Club Westchester fired around a dozen employees for being unauthorized immigrants, some of whom had worked 14 years there, won employee awards there, or personally prepared meals for Trump. The Washington Post spoke to 16 former and current workers of the golf club, some of whom said that their employers had accepted their fraudulent documentation, and others who said that the thinking of the club was "Get the cheapest labor possible".

In May 2019, Univision published a report based on interviews with seven illegal immigrants who said that they worked for Trump Winery in Virginia, with long work hours and no overtime pay. They said that Trump's businesses either did not check for their immigration status or pretended not to know that they were illegal.

In the August 2022 cover story of The Atlantic, Caitlin Dickerson wrote that "the architects of the...[family separation] will likely seek to reinstate it, should they return to power."

== Positions on immigration ==
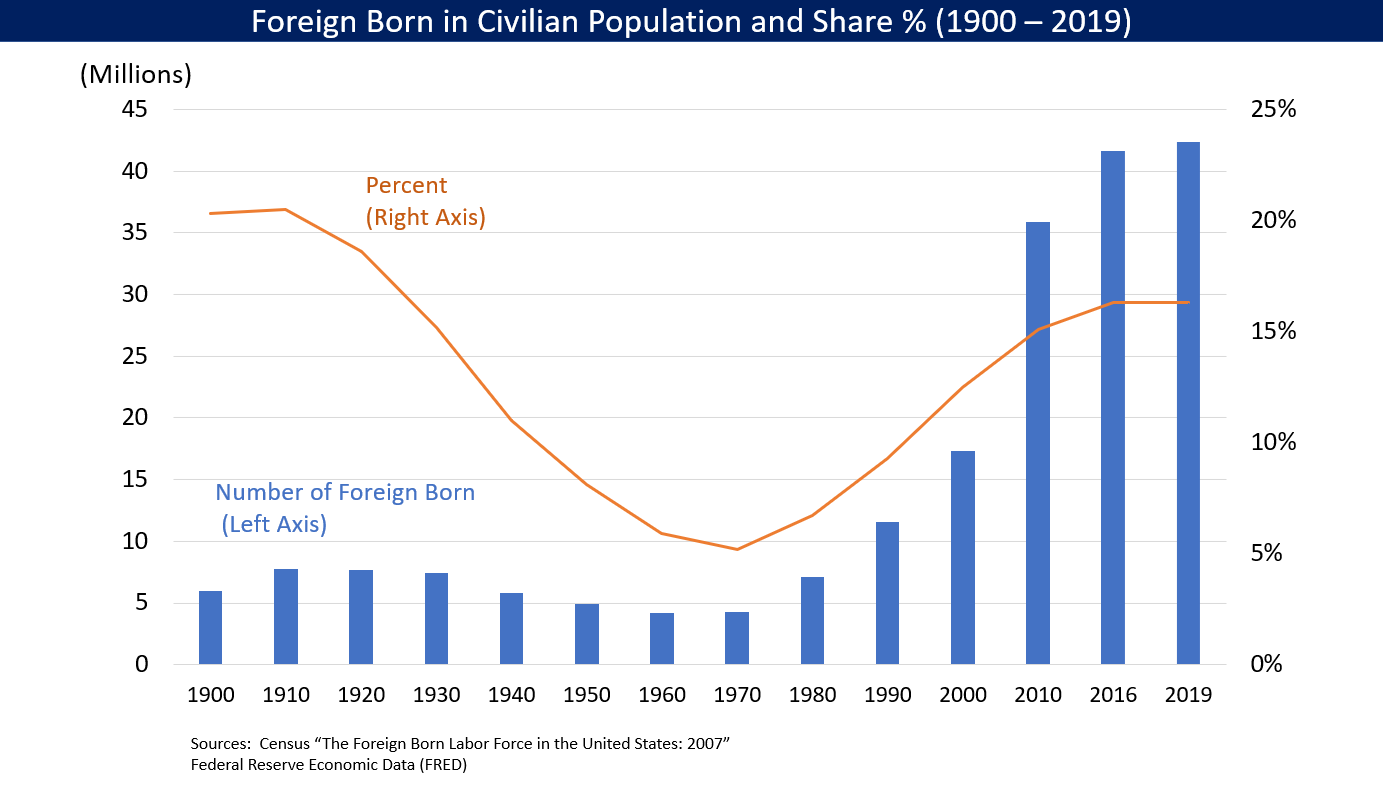
Number and share of foreign born residents in the U.S. civilian non-institutional population from 1900-2019

After Mitt Romney lost the 2012 U.S. presidential election, Trump criticized Romney's immigration policy, saying, "He had a crazy policy of self-deportation which was maniacal. It sounded as bad as it was, and he lost all of the Latino vote. He lost the Asian vote. He lost everybody who is inspired to come into this country." At the 2014 Conservative Political Action Conference, Trump urged Republican politicians not to pass immigration reform, saying immigrants would vote for the Democratic Party and steal American jobs.

During his 2016 presidential campaign, Trump questioned official estimates of the number of illegal immigrants in the United States asserting that the number is actually between 30 and 34,000,000. PolitiFact ruled that his statement was "Pants on Fire", citing experts who noted that no evidence supported an estimate in that range. For example, the Pew Research Center reported in March 2015 that the number of illegal immigrants overall declined from 12.2 million in 2007 to 11.2 million in 2012. The number of illegal immigrants in the U.S. labor force ranged from 8.1 million to 8.3 million between 2007 and 2012, approximately 5% of the U.S. labor force.

During his 2016 campaign, his presidency, and afterwards, Trump has recited the lyrics of the song "The Snake" as a cautionary tale against immigration: a woman takes pity on a snake, which then fatally bites her, declaring, "You knew damn well I was a snake before you took me in".

=== Birthright citizenship ===
In 2015, prior to being elected to the presidency, Trump proposed rolling back birthright citizenship for U.S.-born children of illegal immigrants (referred to by some as "anchor babies"). Under the Citizenship Clause of the Fourteenth Amendment, all persons born on U.S. soil and subject to its jurisdiction are citizens. The mainstream view of the Fourteenth Amendment among legal experts is that everyone born on U.S. soil, regardless of parents' citizenship, is automatically an American citizen, so long as the parents are not foreign diplomats, and the Supreme Court noted in its Plyler v. Doe 457 U.S. 202 (1982) ruling that "no plausible distinction with respect to Fourteenth Amendment 'jurisdiction' can be drawn between resident aliens whose entry into the United States was lawful, and resident aliens whose entry was unlawful." (Note: Text of Plyler v. Doe, 457 U.S. 202 (1982) is available from: Cornell Google Scholar Internet Archive (docket files) Justia Library of Congress Oyez (oral argument audio)) Trump said on October 30, 2018, that he intended to sign an executive order to remove the right of citizenship from people born in the U.S. to foreign nationals. As this would directly contradict the Fourteenth Amendment, it would have begun a legal battle.

Between March 2020 and February 2021, U.S. Customs and Border Protection (CBP) sent at least 11 migrant women to be dropped off in Mexican border towns without birth certificates for their U.S. citizen newborns. A CBP spokesperson claimed, "Hospitals are responsible for providing birth certificates and CBP does not hinder individuals, regardless of immigrations status, from acquiring birth certificates for US citizen children."

=== Changes to legal immigration ===
The Trump administration embraced the Reforming American Immigration for a Strong Economy (RAISE) Act in August 2017. The RAISE Act seeks to reduce levels of legal immigration to the United States by 50% by halving the number of green cards issued. The bill would also impose a cap of 50,000 refugee admissions a year and would end the visa diversity lottery. A study by Penn Wharton economists found that the legislation would by 2027 "reduce GDP by 0.7 percent relative to current law, and reduce jobs by 1.3 million. By 2040, GDP will be about 2 percent lower and jobs will fall by 4.6 million. Despite changes to population size, jobs and GDP, there is very little change to per capita GDP, increasing slightly in the short run and then eventually falling." the RAISE Act did not receive a vote in the Senate. A separate bill to restrict legal immigration, supported by Trump, Cotton, and Perdue, was defeated in the Senate by a 39–60 vote.

On April 22, 2020, President Trump signed an executive order amidst the COVID-19 coronavirus significantly reducing the issuance of green cards to immigrants. With few exceptions, the order concerns thousands of immigrant parents, adult children and siblings of citizens seeking to immigrate to the United States.

=== Kate's Law ===
Kathryn Steinle was killed in July 2015 by an undocumented immigrant, Juan Francisco Lopez-Sanchez, who had multiple convictions and had been previously deported on five occasions. During the election campaign, Trump promised to ask Congress to pass Kate's Law, named after her, to ensure that criminal aliens convicted of illegal reentry received strong, mandatory minimum sentences. A Senate version of the bill was previously introduced by Ted Cruz in July 2016, but it failed to pass a cloture motion.

=== Border security and border wall with Mexico ===
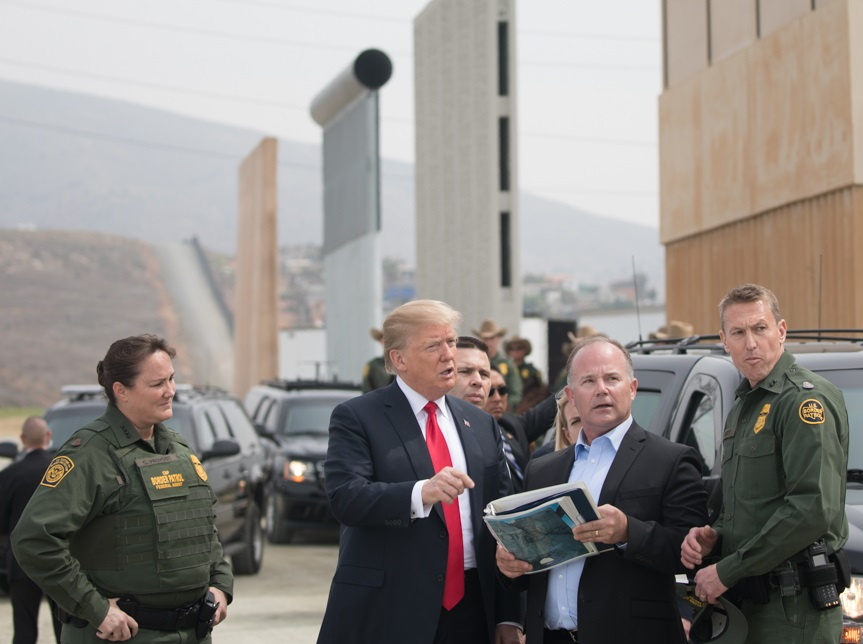
Trump examines border wall prototypes in Otay Mesa, California.

==== 2016 campaign ====
Trump has emphasized U.S. border security and illegal immigration to the United States as a campaign issue. During his announcement speech he falsely stated in part, "When Mexico sends its people, they're not sending their best. They're not sending you. They're sending people that have lots of problems, and they're bringing those problems. ... They're bringing drugs. They're bringing crime. They're rapists. And some, I assume, are good people." On July 6, 2015, Trump issued a written statement to clarify his position on illegal immigration, which drew a reaction from critics. It read in part:

The Mexican Government is forcing their most unwanted people into the United States. They are, in many cases, criminals, drug dealers, rapists, etc. This was evident just this week when, as an example, a young woman in San Francisco was viciously killed by a 5-time deported Mexican with a long criminal record, who was forced back into the United States because they didn't want him in Mexico. This is merely one of thousands of similar incidents throughout the United States. In other words, the worst elements in Mexico are being pushed into the United States by the Mexican government. The largest suppliers of heroin, cocaine and other illicit drugs are Mexican cartels that arrange to have Mexican immigrants trying to cross the borders and smuggle in the drugs. The Border Patrol knows this. Likewise, tremendous infectious disease is pouring across the border. The United States has become a dumping ground for Mexico and, in fact, for many other parts of the world. On the other hand, many fabulous people come in from Mexico and our country is better for it. But these people are here legally, and are severely hurt by those coming in illegally. I am proud to say that I know many hard working Mexicans – many of them are working for and with me ... and, just like our country, my organization is better for it.

A study published in Social Science Quarterly in May 2016 tested Trump's false claim that immigrants are responsible for higher levels of violent and drug-related crime in the United States. It found no evidence that links Mexican or illegal Mexican immigrants specifically to violent or drug-related crime. It did however find a small but significant association between illegal immigrant populations (including non-Mexican illegal immigrants) and drug-related arrests.

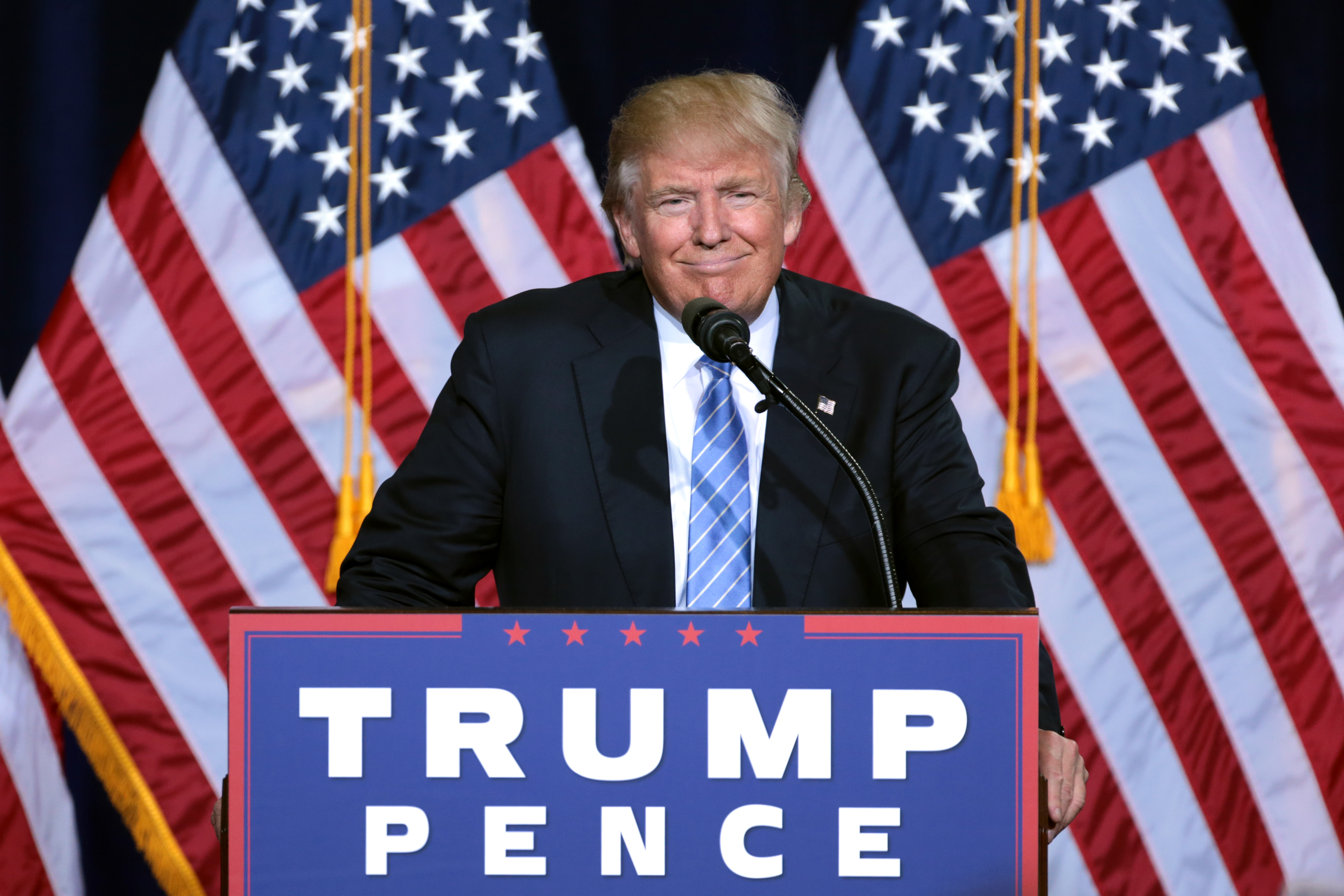
Trump speaking about his immigration policy in Phoenix, Arizona, August 31, 2016

Trump has repeatedly and falsely pledged to build a wall along the U.S.'s southern border, and has said that Mexico would pay for its construction through increased border-crossing fees and NAFTA tariffs. In his speech announcing his candidacy, Trump falsely pledged to "build a great, great wall on our southern border. And I will have Mexico pay for that wall. Mark my words." Trump also said "nobody builds walls better than me, believe me, and I'll build them very inexpensively." The concept for building a barrier to keep illegal immigrants out of the U.S. is not new; 670 miles of fencing (about one-third of the border) was erected under the Secure Fence Act of 2006, at a cost of $2.4 billion. Trump said later that his proposed wall would be "a real wall. Not a toy wall like we have now." In his 2015 book, Trump cites the Israeli West Bank barrier as a successful example of a border wall. "Trump has at times suggested building a wall across the nearly 2,000-mile border and at other times indicated more selective placement." After a meeting with Mexican President Enrique Peña Nieto on August 31, 2016, Trump said that they "didn't discuss" who would pay for the border wall that Trump had made a centerpiece of his presidential campaign. Nieto contradicted that later that day, saying that he at the start of the meeting "made it clear that Mexico will not pay for the wall". Later that day, Trump falsely reiterated his position that Mexico will pay to build an "impenetrable" wall on the Southern border. Trump stated in November 2016 that some portions could have fencing rather than a wall. In August 2017, the transcript of a January 2017 phone call between President Trump and President Nieto was leaked. In the phone call, Trump conceded that he would fund the border wall, not by charging Mexico as he promised during the campaign, but through other ways. But Trump implored the Mexican President to stop saying publicly that the Mexican Government would not pay for the border wall.

Trump has also called for tripling the number of Border Patrol agents.

John Cassidy of The New Yorker wrote that Trump is "the latest representative of an anti-immigrant, nativist American tradition that dates back at least to the Know-Nothings" of the 1840s and 1850s. Trump says "it was legal immigrants who made America great," that the Latinos who have worked for him have been "unbelievable people", and that he wants a wall between the U.S. and Mexico to have a "big, beautiful door" for people to come legally and feel welcomed in the United States.

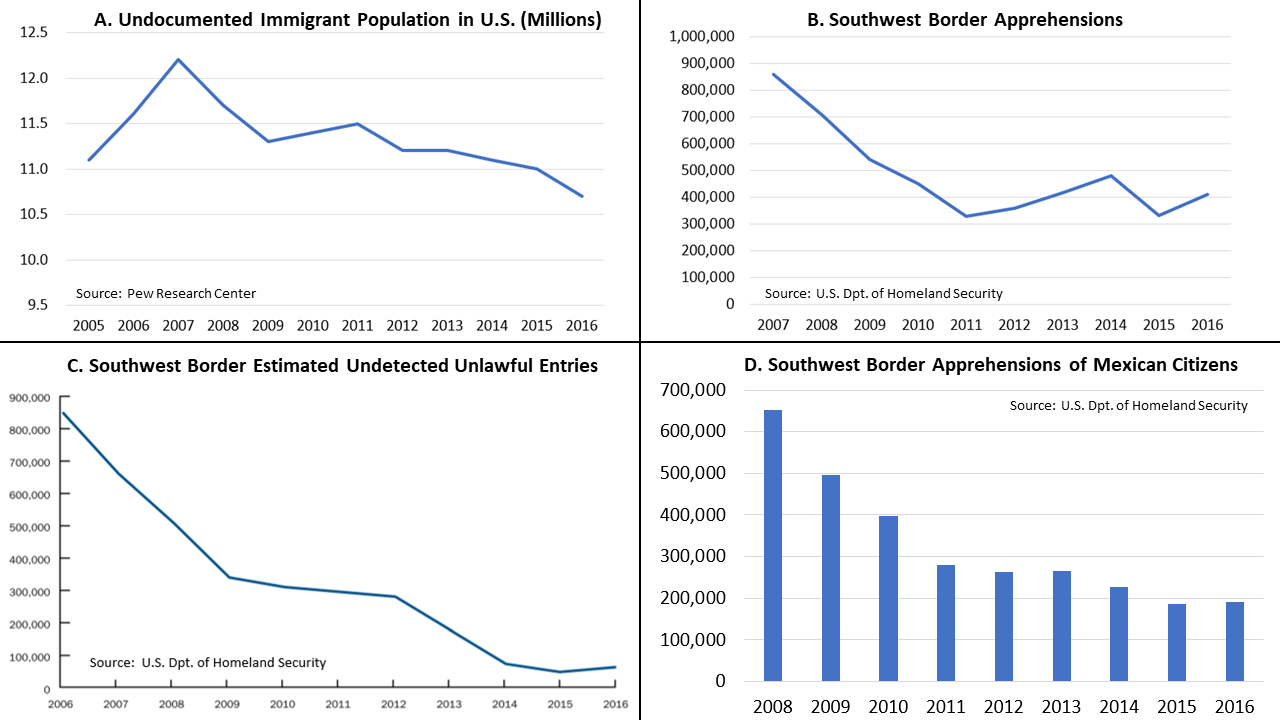
Both the population of unauthorized immigrants in the U.S. and southwestern border apprehensions have declined significantly over the past decade.

Throughout his 2016 campaign he described his vision of a concrete wall, 30 to 50 feet (9.1 to 15.2 m) high and covering 1,000 miles (1,600 km) of the 1,900-mile (3,100 km) border, with the rest of the border being secured by natural barriers. After taking office he suggested a "steel wall with openings" so border agents could see through it; starting in 2018 he referred to it as a "steel slat barrier".

==== First presidency (2017–2021) ====
On September 12, 2017, the United States Department of Homeland Security issued a notice that Acting Secretary of Homeland Security Elaine Duke would be waiving "certain laws, regulations and other legal requirements" to begin construction of the new wall near Calexico, California. The waiver allows the Department of Homeland Security to bypass the National Environmental Policy Act, the Endangered Species Act, the Clean Water Act, the Clean Air Act, the National Historic Preservation Act, the Migratory Bird Treaty Act, the Migratory Bird Conservation Act, the Archaeological Resources Protection Act, the Safe Drinking Water Act, the Noise Control Act, the Solid Waste Disposal Act, the Antiquities Act, the Federal Land Policy and Management Act, the Administrative Procedure Act, the Native American Graves Protection and Repatriation Act, and the American Indian Religious Freedom Act. The state of California, some environmental groups, and Rep. Raúl M. Grijalva (D-Ariz.) filed suit challenging the waivers granted to permit the building of a border wall. On February 27, 2018, Judge Gonzalo P. Curiel ruled that under federal law the administration has the authority to waive multiple environmental laws and regulations in order to expedite the construction of border walls and other infrastructure, so that wall construction can proceed.

The federal government was partially shut down in December 2018 over funding for a wall. In an appearance on State of the Union, Republican Senator Bob Corker called the conflict between Democrats and Republicans over funding a wall a "purposely contrived fight ... a made-up fight so the president can look like he's fighting but even if he wins, our borders are going to be insecure." Corker noted that more funding was passed for border security in 2013 with bipartisan support and said that if Trump was more concerned about border security than politics, he would have accepted a deal offered by Senate Minority Leader Chuck Schumer the previous January that would have allocated $25 billion for border security in exchange for the reauthorization of the Deferred Action for Childhood Arrivals (DACA).

On January 4, 2019, White House Press Secretary Sarah Sanders falsely asserted that nearly 4,000 known or suspected terrorists "that came across our southern border" were apprehended during 2018. However, the figure was actually from fiscal 2017 and referred mostly to individuals who were stopped while attempting to enter America by air at both domestic and foreign airports. DHS secretary Kirstjen Nielsen made a similar false assertion the same day. The State Department reported in September 2018 that by the end of 2017 "there was no credible evidence indicating that international terrorist groups have established bases in Mexico, worked with Mexican drug cartels, or sent operatives via Mexico into the United States."

As of August 2019, the Trump administration's barrier construction had been limited to replacing sections that were in need of repair or outdated, with 60 miles (97 km) of replacement wall built in the Southwest since 2017.

On June 23, 2020, Trump visited Yuma, Arizona, for a 2020 campaign rally commemorating the completion of 200 miles (320 km) of the wall. U.S. Customs and Border Protection confirmed that almost all of this was replacement fencing. By the end of Trump's term on January 21, 2021, 452 miles (727 km) had been built at last report by CBP on January 5, much of it replacing outdated or dilapidated existing barriers.

=== Mass deportation of illegal immigrants ===
==== 2016 campaign ====
In August 2015, during his campaign, Trump proposed the mass deportation of illegal immigrants as a part of his immigration policy. During his first town hall campaign meeting in Derry, New Hampshire, Trump said that if he were to win the election, then on "[d]ay 1 of my presidency, they're getting out and getting out fast".

Trump proposed a "Deportation Force" to carry out this plan, modeled after the 1950s-era "Operation Wetback" program during the Eisenhower administration that ended following a congressional investigation. Historian Mae Ngai of Columbia University, who has studied the program, has said that the military-style operation was both inhumane and ineffective.

According to analysts, Trump's mass-deportation plan would encounter legal and logistical difficulties, since U.S. immigration courts already faced large backlogs. Such a program would also impose a fiscal cost; the fiscally conservative American Action Forum policy group estimates that deporting every illegal immigrant would cause a slump of $381.5 billion to $623.2 billion in private sector output, amounting to roughly a loss of 2% of U.S. GDP. Doug Holtz-Eakin, the group's president, said that the mass deportation of 11 million people would "harm the economy in ways it would normally not be harmed".

In June 2016, Trump stated on Twitter that "I have never liked the media term 'mass deportation' – but we must enforce the laws of the land!" Later in June, Trump stated that he would not characterize his immigration policies as including "mass deportations". However, on August 31, 2016, contrary to earlier reports of a "softening" in his stance, Trump laid out a 10-step plan reaffirming his hardline positions. He reiterated that "anyone who has entered the United States illegally is subject to deportation" with priority given to those who have committed significant crimes and those who have overstayed visas. He noted that all those seeking legalization would have to go home and re-enter the country legally.

==== First presidency (2017–2021) ====
During Donald Trump's presidency the number of undocumented immigrants deported decreased drastically. While under Trump's presidency, U.S. Immigration Customs Enforcement conducted hundreds of raids in workspaces and sent removal orders to families, did not deport as many immigrants as were deported under Obama's presidency. In Obama's first three years in office, around 1.18 million people were deported, while around 800,000 deportations took place under Trump in his three years of presidency. In the final year of his presidency Trump deported an additional 186,000 immigrants, bringing his total to just under 1 million for his full presidency.

==== 2024 campaign ====
During the 2024 election, Trump has stated that his plan would follow the 'Eisenhower model,' a reference to the 1954 campaign Operation Wetback, stating to a crowd in Iowa: "Following the Eisenhower model, we will carry out the largest domestic deportation operation in American history." To achieve the goal of deporting millions per year, Trump has stated his intent to expand a form of deportation that does not require due process hearings which would be accomplished by the expedited removal authorities of 8 U.S. Code § 1225; invoking the Alien Enemies Act within the Alien and Sedition Acts of 1798; and invoking the Insurrection Act of 1807 to allow the military to apprehend migrants and thus bypass the Posse Comitatus Act.

Following his victory in the 2024 United States presidential election Trump said that he had "no choice" but to commence the mass deportation upon his assumption to power in 2025.

==== Second presidency (2025–2029) ====
Deportations
Year	Deportations (% change from prior year)
2025	TBD
2026	TBD(+)
2027	TBD(+)
2028	TBD(+)

=== Muslim immigration ban ===
==== Total Muslim immigration ban ====
In December 2015, Trump proposed a temporary ban on foreign Muslims entering the United States (the U.S. admits approximately 100,000 Muslim immigrants each year) "until we can figure out what's going on". In response to the 2015 San Bernardino shooting, Trump released a statement on "Preventing Muslim Immigration" and called for "a total and complete shutdown of Muslims entering the United States until our country's representatives can figure out what the hell is going on". In a December 2015 interview, the host Willie Geist repeatedly questioned Trump if airline representatives, customs agents or border guards would ask a person's religion. Trump responded that they would and if the person said they were Muslim, they will be denied entry into the country.

Trump cited President Franklin Delano Roosevelt's use during World War II of the Alien and Sedition Acts to issue presidential proclamations for rounding up, holding, and deporting German, Japanese, and Italian alien immigrants, and noted that Roosevelt was highly respected and had highways named after him. Trump stated that he did not agree with Roosevelt's internment of Japanese Americans, and clarified that the proposal would not apply to Muslims who were U.S. citizens or to Muslims who were serving in the U.S. military.

==== Proposed travel ban from certain Muslim-majority countries ====
Trump frequently revised proposals to ban travel from certain Muslim-majority countries to the United States in the course of his presidential campaign.

In late July 2016, NBC News characterized his position as: "Ban all Muslims, and maybe other people from countries with a history of terrorism, but just don't say 'Muslims'." (Rudy Giuliani said on Fox News that Trump tasked him to craft a "Muslim ban" and asked Giuliani to form a committee to show him "the right way to do it legally". The committee, which included former U.S. Attorney General and Chief Judge of the Southern District of New York Michael Mukasey, and Reps. Mike McCaul and Peter T. King, decided to drop the religious basis and instead focused on regions where Giuliani says that there is "substantial evidence that people are sending terrorists" to the United States.)

In May 2016, Trump retreated slightly from his call for a Muslim ban, calling it "merely an idea, not a proposal". On June 13, 2016, he reformulated the ban so that it would be geographical, not religious, applying to "areas of the world where there is a proven history of terrorism against the United States, Europe or our allies". Two hours later, he claimed that ban was only for nations "tied to Islamic terror". In June 2016, he also stated that he would allow Muslims from allies like the United Kingdom to enter the United States. In May 2016, Trump said "There will always be exceptions" to the ban, when asked how the ban would apply to London's newly elected mayor Sadiq Khan. A spokesman for Sadiq Khan said in response that Trump's views were "ignorant, divisive and dangerous" and play into the hands of extremists.

In June 2016, Trump expanded his proposed ban on Muslim immigration to the United States to cover immigration from areas with a history of terrorism. Specifically, Trump stated, "When I am elected, I will suspend immigration from areas of the world when there is a proven history of terrorism against the United States, Europe, or our allies, until we understand how to end these threats." According to lawyers and legal scholars cited in a New York Times report, the president has the power to carry out the plan but it would take an ambitious and likely time-consuming bureaucratic effort, and make sweeping use of executive authority. Immigration analysts also noted that the implementation of Trump's plan could "prompt a wave of retaliation against American citizens traveling and living abroad". In July 2016, Trump described his proposal as encompassing "any nation that has been compromised by terrorism". Trump later referred to the reformulation as "extreme vetting".

When asked in July 2016 about his proposal to restrict immigration from areas with high levels of terrorism, Trump insisted that it was not a "rollback" of his initial proposal to ban all Muslim immigrants. He said, "In fact, you could say it's an expansion. I'm looking now at territory." When asked if his new proposal meant that there would be greater checks on immigration from countries that have been compromised by terrorism, such as France, Germany and Spain, Trump answered, "It's their own fault, because they've allowed people over years to come into their territory."

On August 15, 2016, Trump suggested that "extreme views" would be grounds to be thrown out of the U.S., saying he would deport Seddique Mateen, the father of Omar Mateen (the gunman in the Orlando nightclub shooting), who has expressed support for the Taliban. On August 31, during a speech in Phoenix, Trump said he would form a commission to study which regions or countries he would suspend immigration from, noting that Syria and Libya would be high on that list. Jeff Sessions, an advisor to Trump's campaign on immigration at the time said the Trump campaign's plan was "the best laid out law enforcement plan to fix this country's immigration system that's been stated in this country maybe forever". During confirmation-hearing testimony, he acknowledged supporting vetting based on "areas where we have an unusually high risk of terrorists coming in"; Sessions acknowledged the DOJ would need to evaluate such a plan if it were outside the "Constitutional order."

==== First presidency (2017–2021) ====
The countries affected by the travel ban: All travel restrictions listed below were ended by President Biden on January 20, 2021.

- Chad – The third travel ban (September 24, 2017) prohibited entry for nationals. Ban was removed in the revision to the ban on April 10, 2018.
- Eritrea – The fourth ban (February 21, 2020) restricted travel from immigrants but not on non-immigrants. Suspended issuance of new immigrant visas that could lead to permanent residency. Did not ban non-immigrant visa entries.
- Iran – In the first ban (January 27, 2017), entry was prohibited for 90 days for all nationals. The second ban on March 6, 2017 replaced the first ban and prohibited entry for 90 days. The third ban on September 24, 2017 suspended issuance of new immigrant visas and non-immigrant visas except F, M, and J visas (student and exchange visitor visas).
- Iraq – In the first ban (January 27, 2017), entry was prohibited for 90 days for all nationals. The prohibition was removed in the second ban (March 6, 2017).
- Kyrgyzstan – The fourth ban (February 21, 2020) restricted travel from immigrants but not for non-immigrants. Suspended issuance new immigrant visas that could lead to permanent residency.
- Libya – In the first ban (January 27, 2017), entry was prohibited for 90 days for all nationals. The second ban on March 6, 2017 replaced the first ban and prohibited entry for 90 days. The third ban (September 24, 2017) suspended entry for immigrants and individuals on B-1, B-2 and B-1/B-2 visas (business, tourist and business/tourist visas).
- Myanmar – The fourth ban (February 21, 2020) restricted travel from immigrants but not for non-immigrants. Suspended issuance of new immigrant visas that could lead to permanent residency.
- Nigeria – The fourth ban (February 21, 2020) restricted travel from immigrants but not for non-immigrants. Suspended issuance of new immigrant visas that could lead to permanent residency.
- North Korea – The third ban (September 24, 2017) suspended entry for all non-immigrant visa entries.
- Somalia – In the first ban (January 27, 2017), entry was prohibited for 90 days for all nationals. The second ban on March 6, 2017 replaced the first ban and prohibited entry for 90 days. The third ban (September 24, 2017) suspended entry for immigrants, but not for any non-immigrant visa entries.
- Sudan – In the first ban (January 27, 2017), entry was prohibited for 90 days for all nationals. The second ban on March 6, 2017 replaced the first ban and prohibited entry for 90 days. This country was not affected by the third ban. The fourth ban (February 21, 2020) suspended issuance of new diversity lottery visas. Did not ban non-immigrant visa entries.
- Syria – In the first ban (January 27, 2017), entry was prohibited for 90 days for all nationals. The second ban on March 6, 2017 replaced the first ban and prohibited entry for 90 days. the third ban (September 24, 2017) suspended entry for immigrants and non-immigrants.
- Tanzania – The fourth ban (February 21, 2020) suspended issuance of new diversity lottery visas. Did not ban non-immigrant visa entries.
- Venezuela – The third ban (September 24, 2017) suspended entry for officials of Venezuelan government agencies who are involved in screening and vetting procedures as nonimmigrants on B-1, B-2, and B-1/B-2 visas (business, tourist, and business/tourist visas), as well as the families of those government officials.
- Yemen – In the first ban (January 27, 2017), entry was prohibited for 90 days for all nationals. The second ban on March 6, 2017 replaced the first ban and prohibited entry for 90 days. The third ban (September 24, 2017) suspended entry for immigrants and nonimmigrants on B-1, B-2, and B-1/B-2 visas (business, tourist, and business/tourist visas).

Venezuela, North Korea and Myanmar are the only non Muslim nations in the list.

=== Syrian refugees ===
Trump has on several occasions expressed opposition to allowing Syrian refugees into the U.S. – saying they could be the "ultimate Trojan horse" – and has proposed deporting back to Syria refugees settled in the U.S. By September 2015, Trump had expressed support for taking in some Syrian refugees and praised Germany's decision to take in Syrian refugees.

On a number of occasions in 2015, Trump asserted that "If you're from Syria and you're a Christian, you cannot come into this country, and they're the ones that are being decimated. If you are Islamic ... it's hard to believe, you can come in so easily." PolitiFact rated Trump's claim as "false" and found it to be "wrong on its face", citing the fact that 3 percent of the refugees from Syria have been Christian (although they represent 10 percent of the Syrian population) and finding that the U.S. government is not discriminating against Christians as a matter of official policy.

In a May 2016 interview with Bill O'Reilly, Trump stated "Look, we are at war with these people and they don't wear uniforms. ... . This is a war against people that are vicious, violent people, that we have no idea who they are, where they come from. We are allowing tens of thousands of them into our country now." Politifact ruled this statement "pants on fire", stating that the U.S. is on track to accept 100,000 refugees in 2017, but there is no evidence that tens of thousands of them are terrorists.

=== Restriction of asylum on the grounds of gang-based or domestic violence ===
On July 11, 2018, new guidance was given to USCIS officers who interview asylum seekers at the US' borders and evaluate refugee applications. According to the guidance, asylum claims on the basis of gang-based or domestic violence are unlikely to meet the criterion of persecution "on account of the applicant's membership to a particular social group", unless the home government condones the behavior or demonstrates "a complete helplessness to protect the victims". Furthermore, an applicant's illegal entry may "weigh against a favorable exercise of discretion".

The guidance followed an earlier reversal by Jeff Sessions on June 11, 2018 of a decision by the Board of Immigration Appeals granting a battered woman asylum. Sessions had stated that "[t]he mere fact that a country may have problems effectively policing certain crimes – such as domestic violence or gang violence – or that certain populations are more likely to be victims of crime, cannot itself establish an asylum claim". Domestic violence victims had been eligible for asylum since 2014.

=== ICE raids in 2019 ===
Immigration and Customs Enforcement (ICE) agents have carried out a number of raids in 2019, arriving unannounced and arresting dozens of workers suspected of being illegal immigrants, many who have resided in the U.S. for many years. In April they arrested 114 workers at gardening company plants in Ohio and 97 workers at a meat packing plant in Tennessee. In June, 146 meat plant workers were arrested in Ohio.

In August, ICE carried out arrests at seven agricultural processing plants in Mississippi, arresting about 680 people. Officials called it the largest single-state workplace enforcement action in U.S. history. An ICE official said some of the workers will be immediately deported, some will be charged with crimes, and some will be released pending immigration court hearings. At a news conference a reporter noted that the farms were likely to have been employing illegal labor for years and asked: "Why now? . . . Do you feel like you're being directed by President Trump to do this?" The ICE spokesperson responded that he felt he'd "been directed to enforce the law."

=== Other proposals ===
Trump has proposed making it more difficult for asylum-seekers and refugees to enter the United States, and making the e-Verify system mandatory for employers.

==== Housing ====
The Trump administration considered housing up to 20,000 unaccompanied migrant children on military bases. In a notification to lawmakers, the Pentagon reported officials at Health and Human Services asked about providing beds for children at military installations "for occupancy as early as July through December 31, 2018."

==== Refugee numbers ====
In the 2016 fiscal year, the US accepted 84,995 refugees from around the world. In 2017, the Trump Administration capped the number at 45,000, with the stated rationale of saving money. In 2018 it was announced by the US Secretary of State Mike Pompeo that the United States would cap the number of refugees allowed into the country at 30,000 for fiscal year 2019. On September 26, 2019, the Trump administration announced it plans to allow only 18,000 refugees to resettle in the United States in the 2020 fiscal year, its lowest level since the modern program began in 1980. Since President Trump has not yet signed off on the FY 2020 cap, no refugees have been admitted since October 1, 2019. A moratorium on refugee flights extends through November 5, as of October 29.

In 2020, The Trump administration announces that it plans to slash refugee admissions to U.S. for 2021 to a record low, 15,000 refugees down from a cap of 18,000 for 2020. This is the fourth consecutive year of declining refugee admissions under the Trump term.

Period	Refugee Program
2018	45,000
2019	30,000
2020	18,000
2021	15,000

Period	Refugee Program
2026	TBD
2027	TBD
2028	TBD
2029	TBD

==== Sanctuary cities ====
In November 2018, and again in February 2019, the Trump administration suggested the idea of transporting migrants to sanctuary cities. ICE rejected the suggestions calling them "inappropriate," and in April 2019 the White House sent out a statement saying "This was just a suggestion that was floated and rejected, which ended any further discussion." At a campaign rally on April 27 and again in an interview on April 30, Trump claimed that illegal immigrants were being released in sanctuary cities but the cities were refusing to take them. The Washington Post investigated Trump's statements and was unable to find any evidence that supported Trump's claims.

As of November 2024, one suggestion by the incoming Trump administration, is to deny federal funds to sanctuary cities and states who block ICE's attempts at deporting migrants. For example, Denver's Mayor, Mike Johnston, has stated that he would protest deportations and be willing to go to jail for it. Donald Trump's 'border czar', Tom Homan, responding on Fox News, stated that he would be willing to imprison Johnston on this basis.

==== Asylum restrictions ====
On April 29, 2019, President Trump ordered new restrictions on asylum seekers at the Mexican border – including application fees and work permit restraints – and directed that cases in the already clogged immigration courts be settled within 180 days.

==== DNA Checks ====
On May 2, 2019, Department of Homeland Security announced that it had stepped up its collection of biometric data from migrant families to include a DNA testing pilot program and the fingerprinting of children under the age of 14.

== Executive actions ==
According to the Migration Policy Institute, the Trump administration took over four hundred executive actions on immigration between January 2017 and July 2020. These changes limited asylum, banned entry from a list of countries (initially seven, but later expanded to thirteen), sought to deter cross-border immigration from Mexico and Central America, rescinded temporary protected status for immigrants from a series of countries, expanded limits on legal immigration through the "public charge" rule, and drastically reduced admissions of refugees, among other policy shifts.

=== Travel ban and refugee suspension ===
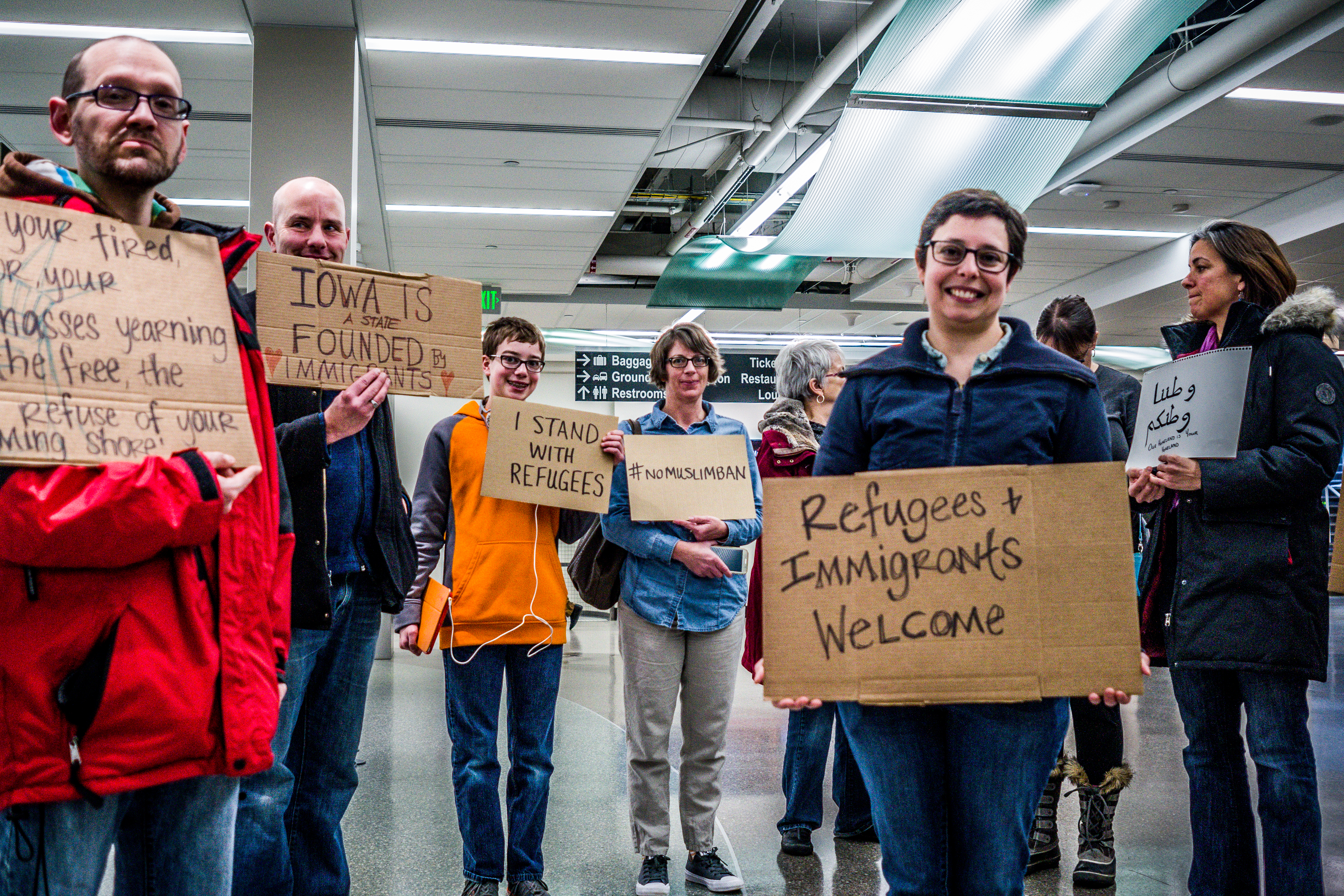
Protestors at Des Moines International Airport in Iowa on January 29, 2017

On January 27, 2017, Trump signed an executive order (Number 13769), titled "Protecting the Nation From Terrorist Attacks by Foreign Nationals", that suspended entry for citizens of seven countries for 90 days: Iraq, Iran, Libya, Somalia, Sudan, Syria and Yemen, totaling more than 134 million people. The order also stopped the admission of refugees of the Syrian civil war indefinitely, and the entry of all refugees to the United States for 120 days. Refugees who were on their way to the United States when the order was signed were stopped and detained at airports.

Implicated by this order is 8 U.S.C. Sec. 1182 "Whenever the President finds that the entry of any aliens or of any class of aliens into the United States would be detrimental to the interests of the United States, he may by proclamation, and for such period as he shall deem necessary, suspend the entry of all aliens or any class of aliens as immigrants or nonimmigrants, or impose on the entry of aliens any restrictions he may deem to be appropriate." 8 U.S. Code § 1182 (Section 212(f) of the Immigration and Nationality Act of 1952).

Critics argue that Congress later restricted this power in 1965, stating plainly that no person could be "discriminated against in the issuance of an immigrant visa because of the person's race, sex, nationality, place of birth or place of residence." (8 U.S. Code § 1152) The only exceptions are those provided for by Congress (such as the preference for Cuban asylum seekers).

Many legal challenges to the order were brought immediately after its issuance: from January 28 to 31, almost 50 cases were filed in federal courts. Some courts, in turn, granted temporary relief, including a nationwide temporary restraining order (TRO) that barred the enforcement of major parts of the executive order. The Trump administration is appealing the TRO.

On March 6, 2017, Trump signed a revised executive order, that, among other differences with the original order, excluded Iraq, visa-holders, and permanent residents from the temporary suspension and did not differentiate Syrian refugees from refugees from other countries.

On June 26, the Supreme Court partially permitted the executive order to come into effect and invalidated certain injunctions that were put on the order by two federal appeals courts earlier.

On September 24, 2017 the executive order was superseded by Presidential Proclamation 9645 to establish travel restrictions on seven countries, omitting Sudan from the previous list while adding North Korea and Venezuela.

In late October 2017, Trump ended a ban on refugee admissions while adding new rules for "tougher vetting of applicants" and essentially halting entry of refugees from 11 high risk nations. This has led to a 40% drop in entrants.

On June 26, 2018, the Supreme Court ruled 5-4 along ideological lines in favor of the September 2017 version (Presidential Proclamation 9645) of the Trump administration's travel ban, reversing lower courts that had deemed the ban unconstitutional.

In January 2020, he added six more countries to the ban, effective February 22. People from Nigeria (the most populous country in Africa), Myanmar (where refugees have been fleeing alleged genocide), Eritrea, and Kyrgyzstan will be banned from obtaining immigrant visas (for people intending to stay in the United States). People from Sudan and Tanzania will be banned from obtaining diversity visas.

=== Increased immigration enforcement ===
On January 25, 2017, Trump signed Executive Order 13768 which, among other things, significantly increased the number of immigrants considered a priority for deportation. Previously, under Obama, an immigrant ruled removable would only be considered a priority to actually be physically deported if they, in addition to being removable, were convicted of serious crimes such as felonies or multiple misdemeanors. Under the Trump administration, such an immigrant can be considered a priority to be removed even if convicted only of minor crimes, or even if merely accused of such criminal activity. Guadalupe Garcia de Rayos, who came illegally to the United States when she was 14, may have become the first person deported under the terms of this order on February 9, 2017. Garcia de Rayos had previously been convicted of felony criminal impersonation related to her use of a falsified Social Security card to work at an Arizona water park. This conviction had not been considered serious enough, under Obama, to actually remove her from the country, although she was required to check in regularly with ICE officials, which she had done regularly since 2008. The first time she checked in with ICE officials after the new executive order took effect, however, led to her detention and physical removal from the country. Greg Stanton, the Mayor of Phoenix commented that "Rather than tracking down violent criminals and drug dealers, ICE is spending its energy deporting a woman with two American children who has lived here for more than two decades and poses a threat to nobody." ICE officials said that her case went through multiple reviews in the immigration court system and that the "judges held she did not have a legal basis to remain in the US".

The Washington Post reported on February 10, 2017 that federal agents had begun to conduct sweeping immigration enforcement raids in at least six states.

Federal Reserve officials have warned that Trump's immigration restrictions will likely have an adverse impact on the economy. Immigration is a core component of economic growth, they have said.

Ilya Somin, Professor of Law at George Mason University, argued that Trump's withholding of federal funding would be unconstitutional: "Trump and future presidents could use [the executive order] to seriously undermine constitutional federalism by forcing dissenting cities and states to obey presidential dictates, even without authorization from Congress. The circumvention of Congress makes the order a threat to separation of powers, as well." On April 25, 2017, U.S. District Judge William Orrick issued a nationwide preliminary injunction halting the executive order. Subsequently, Judge Orrick issued a nationwide permanent injunction on November 20, 2017, declaring that section 9(a) of Executive Order 13768 was "unconstitutional on its face" and violates "the separation of powers doctrine and deprives [the plaintiffs] of their Tenth and Fifth Amendment rights."

On June 17, 2019, Trump tweeted, "Next week ICE will begin the process of removing the millions of illegal aliens who have illicitly found their way into the United States." The pre-dawn raids were set to begin five days later. Hours before the raids were to commence, and hours after he had defended the plan, Trump tweeted he would suspend the operation for two weeks to see if Congress could "work out a solution." Speaker Nancy Pelosi had called Trump the previous night asking him to call off the plan, as it could endanger the approval by Congress of billions in funding in coming weeks to support humanitarian challenges at the border.

=== Phase out of DACA ===
President Obama's "Deferred Action for Childhood Arrivals" (DACA) Executive Order from 2012 enabled an estimated 800,000 young adults ("Dreamers") brought illegally into the U.S. as children to work legally without fear of deportation. President Trump announced in September 2017 that he was cancelling this Executive Order with effect from six months and he called for legislation to be enacted before the protection phased out in March 2018, stating "I have a love for these people, and hopefully now Congress will be able to help them and do it properly." Trump's action was widely protested across the country. Business leaders argued it was unfair and could harm the economy. The cancellation of the program was put on hold by a court order, and the Supreme Court ruled in June 2020 that the Trump administration's decision to end DACA was arbitrary and violated the Administrative Procedure Act.

=== Cancellation of Temporary Protected Status ===
The Federal government grants Temporary Protected Status to immigrants in the country in the wake of national emergencies in their various countries of origin. The Trump administration announced it was canceling such status for immigrants as follows:

- Haiti – On November 5, 2017, the administration announced that 45,000 to 59,000 Haitians would lose temporary protected status effective July 22, 2019.
- El Salvador – On January 8, 2018, the administration announced that nearly 200,000 Salvadorans would lose temporary protected status effective September 9, 2019.
- Nicaragua – On November 5, 2017, the administration announced that some 2,500 Nicaraguans would lose temporary protected status effective January 5, 2019.
- Sudan
- Nepal
- Honduras

On January 11, 2018, during an Oval Office meeting about immigration reform, Democratic lawmakers proposed restoring Temporary Protective Status to these countries as part of compromise immigration legislation. In response, Trump reportedly said: "Those shitholes send us the people that they don't want", and suggested that the US should instead increase immigration from "places like Norway" and Asian countries. Trump's reported comments, which he later partially denied having made, received widespread domestic and international condemnation.

In June 2018, immigrants faced with losing their status filed suit against the terminations in Federal District Court in San Francisco, arguing that they were made arbitrarily, without a formal process, and in a discriminatory manner.

=== Zero-tolerance policy and family separation on the Mexico border ===
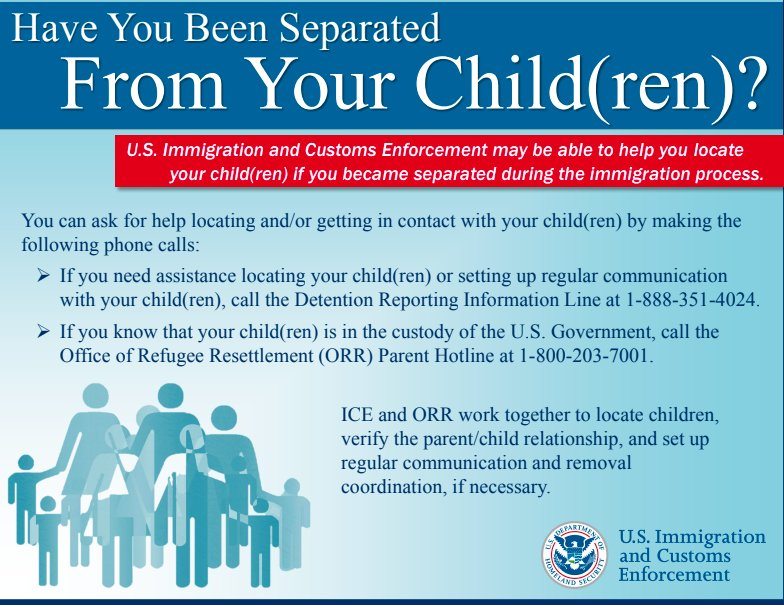
A flyer circulated by the Department of Homeland Security in 2018 offering assistance to parents separated from their children while in custody

By February 2018, the Trump administration had begun a practice of separating minor children entering the United States from the parents or relatives that accompanied them, including people applying for asylum. On May 7, 2018, the Justice Department announced a policy of "zero tolerance" of unauthorized crossing of the border with Mexico, coordinated between the Departments of Homeland Security and the Justice Department. Under this policy, Federal authorities separated children from their parents, relatives, or other adults who accompanied them in crossing the border illegally: parents were sent to federal jails awaiting their hearing while children were held in shelters under the aegis of the Department of Health and Human Services.

White House Chief of Staff John F. Kelly described the policy as "a tough deterrent" discouraging arrivals: "They're coming here for a reason. And I sympathize with the reason. But the laws are the laws. But a big name of the game is deterrence." In June 2018, Attorney General Sessions said, "If people don't want to be separated from their children, they should not bring them with them. We've got to get this message out. You're not given immunity." Court documents released in late June showed that it was the government's intent to separate children from their parents with "no procedure or mechanism for that parent to reunite with their child, absent hiring lawyers or pursuing it on their own."

ProPublica recording of crying children separated from their families

The American Academy of Pediatrics, the American College of Physicians and the American Psychiatric Association condemned the policy, with the American Academy of Pediatrics saying that the policy has caused "irreparable harm" to the children. Numerous religious groups and figures voiced opposition to the policy. Forty Democratic United States Senators sent a letter to President Trump urging him to "rescind this unethical, ineffective, and inhumane policy and instead prioritize approaches that align with our humanitarian and American values." In June, a national protest was held which drew hundreds of thousands of protesters from all 50 states in more than 600 towns and cities.

According to a 2018 PBS Frontline investigative report, almost 3,000 mostly Central American children were separated from their families before the practice was ended by a judicial order in June. On June 26, 2018, Judge Dana Sabraw ordered that all of the separated children were to be reunited with their parents within 30 days. Data, current as of August 20, showed that about a fifth of the children had still not been reunited with their parents.

However, a follow-up government report released in January 2019, revealed that while HHS had previously said that the total number of children separated from their parents was 2,737, a new investigation revealed that the actual number of separated children was several thousand higher, with the exact number unknown due to poor record keeping. HHS is not able to identify or count children who were released from the government's custody before officials started identifying separated families. Government officials stated that identifying all of the children would take up to two years.

==== June 20, 2018, executive order ====
Responding to widespread criticism of family separation, President Trump issued an executive order titled "Affording Congress an Opportunity to Address Family Separation." The Order instructed the Department of Homeland Security to maintain custody of parents and children jointly, "to the extent permitted by law and subject to the availability of appropriations." It also instructed the Justice Department to attempt to overturn the Flores Agreement, which limits the time for holding children and families with children to 20 days. At the signing ceremony, Trump said, "We're going to have strong, very strong borders but we are going to keep the families together. I didn't like the sight or the feeling of families being separated." Senator Kamala Harris criticized the order, saying that "This Executive Order doesn't fix the crisis. Indefinitely detaining children with their families in camps is inhumane and will not make us safe." On June 21, the Justice Department filed a request with a federal district court asking for a modification of the Flores agreement to allow children to be detained for more than 20 days.

==== Call for suspension of due process rights ====
On June 24, 2018, Trump tweeted, "We cannot allow all of these people to invade our Country. When somebody comes in, we must immediately, with no Judges or Court Cases, bring them back from where they came ..." [sic] According to Harvard constitutional law professor Laurence H. Tribe, the Supreme Court has repeatedly held that "the due process requirements of the 5th and 14th Amendments apply to all persons, including those in the U.S. unlawfully." Tribe wrote, "Trump is making the tyrannical claim that he has the right to serve as prosecutor, judge and jury with respect to all those who enter our country. That is a breathtaking assertion of unbounded power – power without any plausible limit."

The Washington Post analyzed Trump's tweet and concluded, "As a legal question, experts say Trump's proposition is unsound. The Constitution grants due-process rights not only to U.S. citizens but to every 'person' in the United States. The Supreme Court has said this covers illegal immigrants."

==== Reported continued family separations ====
There have been various media reports from February 2019 to June 2019 that the Trump administration had continued to separate migrant families even after a court had ordered in June 2018 to put an end to routine family separations.

Advocates reported on January 14, 2021 that the parents of 611 children could not be found. That was down to 506 children by February 24. The situation is complicated because about 322 of the 506 children are believed to have been deported. Some parents agreed to be deported without their children to allow their children to remain in the U.S. to claim asylum, lawyers say.

==== Flores filings ====
In 1997, the Flores settlement was signed. It says migrant children must be detained in the least-restrictive setting possible and only for about 20 days. Seeking to end the 20 day restrictions and licensing requirements of detention centers, on June 21, 2018, the Trump Department of Justice asked US District Court Judge Dolly Gee to alter her 2015 ruling in Reno v. Flores On July 9, Judge Gee denied the government's request to hold families together indefinitely in ICE facilities, and its request to exempt detention facilities from state licensing requirements for that purpose.

On August 21, 2019, the Trump administration announced it was ending the Flores Agreement and replacing it with a new policy scheduled to take place in 60 days. The new policy will allow families with children to be detained indefinitely, until their cases are decided. Nineteen states and the District of Columbia have sued the Trump administration to block the administration plan to end the Flores Agreement. They claim that the new policy will result in the expansion of unlicensed detention centers allowing the administration to "set its own standards for care – in effect, licensing itself."

=== Restrictions on asylum ===
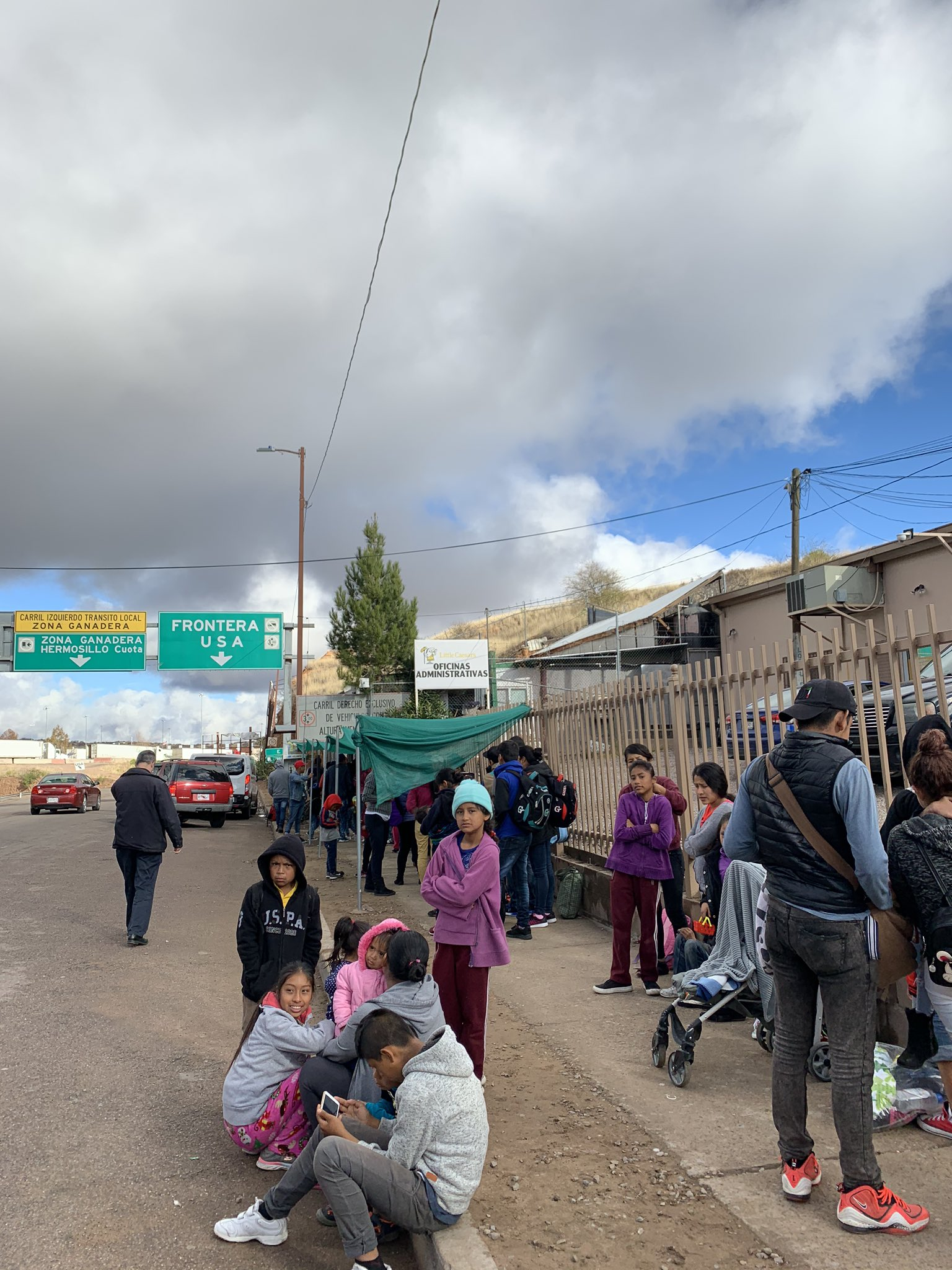
Migrants at the Kino Border Initiative in Nogales, Sonora in 2020

In January 2017, the American Immigration Council and five other advocacy organizations filed a complaint with the Department of Homeland Security's Office for Civil Rights and Civil Liberties protesting the "systemic denial of entry to asylum seekers". It is not legal for the US to deny anyone the right to seek asylum. Nonetheless, according to advocacy lawyers, asylum seekers presenting at border crossings were denied for a variety of reasons, including "the daily quota has been reached", that they needed to present a visa, or that they needed to schedule an appointment through Mexican authorities, none of which are accurate. One nonprofit organization spokesperson commented, "We've basically arrived at a place where applying for asylum is not available to most people."

The Department of Homeland Security's Office of Inspector General concluded that this practice, which it calls "metering" legal entry "leads some aliens who would otherwise seek legal entry into the United States to cross the border illegally".

The administration also cancelled the Central American Minors Program (CAM) which had given the hope to parents that they would be able to bring their child into the US legally – ending the parole portion of the program in August 2017 and no longer accepting new applications for the refugee portion of the program as of November 9, 2017. The CAM program had allowed some parents to bring their children legally to the US since 2015, with the children gaining the right to apply for citizenship if they were granted special refugee status. Due to the processing delays, the program had not offered relief for those who faced the threat of immediate danger, yet at the level of the individual families it had made it less attractive to bring children illegally, as there was the prospect of legal entry.

In June 2018, the Department of Justice implemented a policy to deny that lack of protection from gender-based violence or gang violence were lawful bases for claiming asylum, overturning a 2016 Board of Immigration Appeals precedent. In his opinion, Attorney General Jeff Sessions wrote, "Generally, claims by aliens pertaining to domestic violence or gang violence perpetrated by nongovernmental actors will not qualify for asylum." In December 2018, Federal Judge Emmet G. Sullivan overturned the limitation on asylum as inconsistent with the Immigration and Nationality Act. Human Rights Watch reported that the program "is expelling asylum seekers to ill-prepared, dangerous Mexican border cities where they face high if not insurmountable barriers to receiving due process on their asylum claims." The policy is under review by the Ninth Circuit Court of Appeals, but the court has permitted it to continue during the review.

On November 9, 2018, President Trump issued a proclamation suspending the right of asylum to any migrant crossing the US–Mexico border outside of a lawful port of entry. U.S. District Judge Jon S. Tigar of the Northern California District Court issued a November 19 injunction against implementing the policy, which was upheld by the US Supreme Court on December 21, 2018. In a separate case, Judge Randolph Moss of the DC District Court ruled in August 2019 to vacate the Interim Final Rule establishing the asylum ban for violating the Immigration and Nationality Act provides that a migrant may apply for asylum "whether or not at a designated port of arrival", as previously argued by the Supreme Court

On December 20, 2018, the Department of Homeland Security announced the Migrant Protection Protocols, colloquially known as the "Remain in Mexico" program, a policy allowing the government to release migrants with asylum claims to Mexico to await their asylum hearings in the United States. It implemented the program with a policy memo released on January 25, 2019. The program was first rolled out at the San Ysidro, CA port of entry bordering Tijuana, Baja California. It was subsequently implemented in Calexico-Mexicali, El Paso-Ciudad Juarez, Brownsville-Matamoros, Laredo-Nuevo Laredo, Eagle Pass-Piedras Negras, and Nogales-Nogales. According to DHS, "Aliens whose claims are found meritorious by an immigration judge will be allowed to remain in the U.S. Those determined to be without valid claims will be removed from the U.S. to their country of nationality or citizenship." By June 2019, over 12,000 migrants had been returned to Mexico under the policy. By September 2019, 47,000 people had been returned; and 57,000 by December 2019. Human Rights First found that at least 636 of those returned suffered violent crimes in Mexico, including kidnapping, rape, torture, and assault. As of September 2019, fewer than ten thousand migrants in the program had their cases reviewed: 11 had been granted asylum; 5,085 cases were denied; and 4,471 cases were dismissed without being evaluated, often on procedural grounds. The asylum admission rate for the program, 0.1%, is dramatically lower than the 20% among other arriving immigrants.

On July 15, 2019, the Department of Homeland Security and the Department of Justice announced an Interim Final Rule to take effect on July 16 that would rule foreigners who cross the US–Mexico border ineligible for asylum if they had not previously applied for asylum in countries they had traveled through, effectively barring asylum claims on the border from nationals of Central America and Cuba. The American Civil Liberties Union (ACLU) promised to immediately challenge the rule in court. On July 24, 2019, judge Timothy Kelly of the DC District Court upheld the new rule, but that same day judge Jon Tigar of the Northern California District Court issued a preliminary injunction against the rule, halting its implementation until the legal matters could be resolved. In September 2019, the Supreme Court allowed the rule to take effect while legal challenges were pending.

On March 4, 2020, the United States Court of Appeals for the Ninth Circuit ordered the "Remain in Mexico" program halted in the states under its jurisdiction, on the presumption that it violates statutory law; a lawsuit by various advocacy groups against the Department of Homeland Security is still awaiting final decision. On March 11, 2020, the US Supreme Court said that the Trump administration could continue the program while litigation continues.

On April 16, 2019, Attorney General Barr announced a new policy to deny bail to asylum seekers in an effort to end the "catch and release" policy. On July 2, 2019, the Western District Court of Washington issued a class-wide ruling to require bond hearings for noncitizens who showed a credible fear of persecution in their home country and were being held separate from their families. On March 27, 2020, the Ninth Circuit Court of Appeals upheld the ruling, saying that even though Congress has barred lower courts from issuing injunctions restraining the operation of immigration removal proceedings "other than with respect ... to an individual alien", individual alien just means it cannot be an organization, and the class is filled with individual aliens. A dissenting opinion said that such a reading renders "individual" superfluous.

In February 2021, the administration of President Joe Biden ended the "Remain in Mexico" policy, resuming admission of new asylum seekers and the approximately 25,000 with pending cases to the United States, and asking the Supreme Court to dismiss the appeal as moot. In August 2021, a federal judge in Texas ordered a resumption of the Trump-era border policy that required migrants to remain in Mexico until their US immigration court date. A stay to block the re-enforcement of the "Remain in Mexico" policy was denied by both the Fifth Circuit Court of Appeals and the U.S. Supreme Court. As result of the Supreme Court ruling, the U.S. government is now required to re-enforce the policy.

=== "Public charge" restrictions on awarding Green cards ===
On August 12, 2019, U.S. Citizenship and Immigration Services (USCIS) formally announced a new rule restricting poorer immigrants from attaining Lawful Permanent Resident status, popularly known as a Green Card. Three federal courts on October 11, 2019 issued preliminary injunctions blocking the rule just four days before it had been scheduled to take effect. On December 5, 2019 the 9th Circuit Court of Appeals reversed the preliminary injunction from the California district court, ruling the administration was likely to prevail in its arguments that it had legal authority to issue the regulations. On December 9, 2019 the Fourth Circuit Court of Appeals reversed the preliminary injunction from the Maryland district court. The rule remained blocked, however, due to the New York district court having issued a nationwide injunction. On January 8, 2020 the Second Circuit Court of Appeals refused to lift the New York courts nationwide injunction. On January 27, 2020 the U.S. Supreme Court reversed the Second Circuit and lifted the nationwide injunction on the rule, allowing the administration to implement the rule everywhere except the state of Illinois. On February 21, 2020 the Supreme court reversed the injunction from the Illinois district court, allowing the administration to enforce the rule nationwide.

Under the proposed rule, legal immigrants who have received – or are deemed likely to need – public benefits such as Supplemental Security Income, Temporary Assistance for Needy Families, the Supplemental Nutrition Assistance Program, Medicaid, and public housing assistance for more than a total of twelve months within any 36-month period may be classified as a "public charge" ineligible for permanent residency. Immigration official may investigate the health, income, wealth, education, and family of applicants for permanent residency to predict whether they will become a public charge in the future. The term "public charge" appears in the Immigration and Nationality Act, but is not defined by the law. Refugees, asylum seekers, pregnant women, children, and family members of those serving in the Armed Forces are excluded from the restrictions. The Trump administration estimates that 58% of households headed by non-citizens use a public welfare program and half use Medicaid.

Kenneth T. Cuccinelli II, the acting director of USCIS stated the policy will "have the long-term benefit of protecting taxpayers by ensuring people who are immigrating to this country don't become public burdens, that they can stand on their own two feet, as immigrants in years past have done." Speaking on NPR, Cuccinelli described the new regulation saying "Give me your tired and your poor who can stand on their own two feet and who will not become a public charge." Cuccinelli was referring to Emma Lazarus' famous words on a bronze plaque at the Statue of Liberty, which starts, "Give me your tired, your poor / Your huddled masses yearning to breathe free". When Cuccinelli's comments drew criticisms he defended his remarks saying the poem was "... of course referring back to people coming from Europe, where they had class-based societies, where people were considered wretched if they weren't in the right class." That comment drew a large amount of condemnation as well. Democratic 2020 presidential candidate Beto O'Rourke tweeted: "This administration finally admitted what we've known all along: they think the Statue of Liberty only applies to white people."

The National Immigration Law Center stated that the rule "will have a dire humanitarian impact, forcing some families to forgo critical lifesaving health care and nutrition. The damage will be felt for decades to come." The law center announced it would sue to prevent the policy from taking effect. The policy was championed within the administration by Senior Advisor to the President Stephen Miller.

On August 17, 2019, Bloomberg reported that the White House, led by Stephen Miller, had reportedly been making plans to stop illegal immigrant children from attending public schools. The effort was eventually abandoned after Trump officials were "told repeatedly that any such effort ran afoul of a 1982 Supreme Court case guaranteeing access to public schools." Randi Weingarten, the president of the American Federation of Teachers commented, "Their racist, anti-immigration crusade knows no bounds. Using children like this as political pawns is another low point for the Trump administration."

In October 2019, the Trump administration announced a requirement that people applying for immigrant visas prove they can purchase health insurance, get employer-sponsored health insurance, or pay for medical expenses. The policy was blocked by a federal court before it went into effect, in response to a lawsuit arguing it was incompatible with the Immigration and Naturalization Act.

=== Elimination of "Medical deferred action" ===
On August 7, 2019, the United States Citizenship and Immigration Service terminated a program called "medical deferred action", which allowed immigrants to remain in the country temporarily while they or their children receive treatment for serious or life-threatening medical conditions. The only exception was for military families. Without making any public announcement, the service sent letters to multiple families whose children are getting treated under this plan, telling them their permission to be in the country would be revoked in 33 days. Some patients complained they would die if they were not allowed to continue treatment in the United States. Met with public outcry, this policy change was reversed by September. In October 2019, USCIS Acting Director Ken Cuccinelli later testified to a Congressional investigation that he alone had made the decision to end the program.

=== Reorganization of Department of Homeland Security ===
Saying he wanted to go in a "tougher direction," Trump began a major reorganization of the DHS on April 5, 2019, first by withdrawing his nomination of Ron Vitiello to head Immigration and Customs Enforcement. Two days later he forced the resignation of DHS secretary Kirstjen Nielsen. Trump named Customs and Border Protection commissioner Kevin McAleenan to succeed Nielsen, although by law Under Secretary of Homeland Security for Management Claire Grady was in line to succeed Nielsen; Grady was reported to be leaving the administration. Director of Citizenship and Immigration L. Francis Cissna also left. The reorganization was reported to be on the recommendation of Trump advisor Stephen Miller, an anti-immigration hardliner. CNN reported that during March 2019 meetings Trump demanded that asylum seekers be denied entry into the country, which he was advised was contrary to law and could expose border agents to personal legal liability. He also demanded that the port of El Paso be closed by noon the next day. CNN quoted a senior administration official as saying, "At the end of the day, the President refuses to understand that the Department of Homeland Security is constrained by the laws."

=== Changes to resettlement program ===
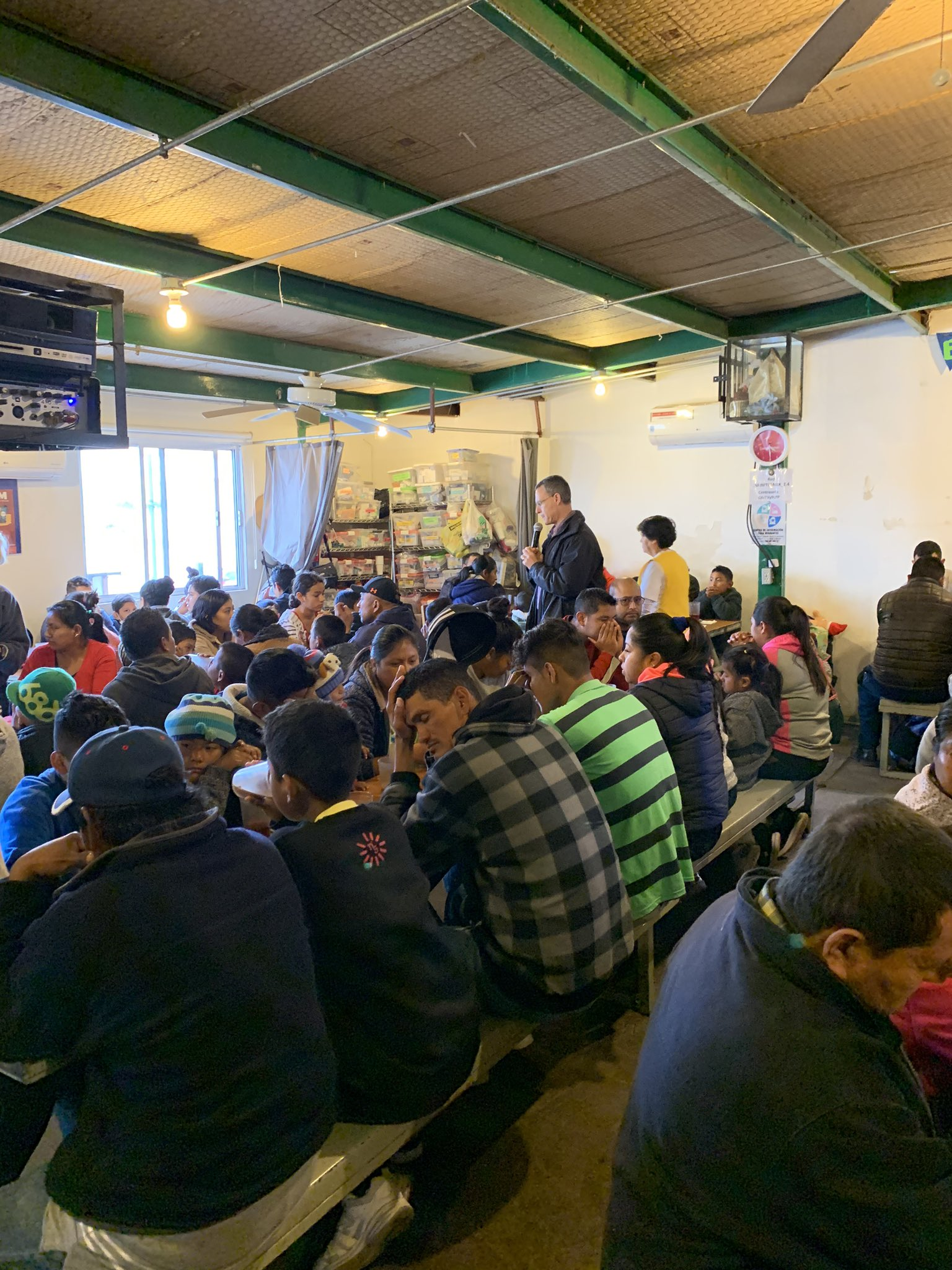
Migrants at the Kino Border Initiative in Nogales, Sonora

President Trump reduced the cap on the number of refugees resettled in the United States from 110,000 set by President Obama, to 30,000 for FY2019 and 18,000 for FY2020. Trump also added quotas for refugees from particular countries and on those seeking asylum on religious grounds.

Executive Order 13888 (issued September 26, 2019) added the requirement that state and local governments consent to refugee resettlement in order for federal funds to be used. Resettlement agencies expressed confusion about which governments needed to consent; the order required the U.S. Secretary of State and the U.S. Secretary of Health and Human Services to develop a procedure by December 25, 2019. On November 21, three resettlement agencies sued to block the order, arguing it would keep thousands of refugees from being reunited with their families. In January 2020, a federal judge granted the resettlement agencies' request for a preliminary injunction to block the executive order from going into effect.

=== Fee increases ===
On November 8, 2019, U.S. Citizenship and Immigration Services officially proposed fee increases to balance its budget (which is largely unsubsidized by taxes). It would for the first time impose a fee ($50) on asylum applications from within the United States (not at the border) and Deferred Action for Childhood Arrivals recipients ($275), and would also increase the fee for green card holders to apply for citizenship from $640 to $1170. Critics accused the President of making this change to reduce legal immigration, and said it would harm refugees. The public comment period for the proposal closed on February 10, 2020.

=== Troop deployments to the border ===
In April 2018, Trump signed a proclamation to deploy National Guard troops to the U.S.–Mexico border. Later in 2018 and in 2019, the Defense Department deployed additional National Guard and active duty military troops to the border.

== Legal and reports ==
The ACLU published a report; Neglect and Abuse of Unaccompanied Immigrant Children by U.S. Customs and Border Protection, in May 2018 that alleged a "culture of impunity" within US Customs and Border Protection and the Department of Homeland Security. The documents describe hundreds of cases of alleged abuse between 2009 and 2014, in a system that a staff attorney Mitra Ebadolahi called brutal and lawless. In response, the US Customs and Border Protection agency issued a statement in which it called the allegations "unfounded and baseless."

A federal lawsuit was brought forward by immigrant children, separate covering a period from 2015 though 2017. Immigrant children as young as 14, who are housed in the Shenandoah Valley Juvenile Center near Staunton, Virginia allege over half a dozen sworn statements from teens jailed in the center. The alleged behavior in the statements are claims of being beaten while handcuffed, locked up for extended time in solitary confinement, being left nude and shivering in concrete cells, and being stripped of clothes and strapped to chairs with bags over their heads.

The Texas Tribune reported that detained children who had been held at the Shiloh Treatment Center from 2014 through 2017 said they had been forcibly treated with antipsychotic drugs by the facility personnel, based on legal filings from a class action lawsuit. According to the filings, the drugs made the children listless, dizzy and incapacitated, and in some cases unable to walk. According to a mother, after receiving the drug, her child repeatedly fell, hitting her head and eventually ending up in a wheel chair. Another child stated that she tried to open a window, at which point one of the supervisors hurled her against a door, choked her until she fainted and had a doctor forcibly administer an injection while she was being held down by two guards. A forensic psychiatrist consulted by the Tribune compared the practice to what "the old Soviet Union used to do". The treatment center is one of the companies that have been investigated on charges of mistreating children, although the federal government continues to employ the private agency which runs it as a federal contractor.

In June 2019, the DHS inspector general reviewed conditions at five south Texas detention centers managed by Customs and Border Protection, finding squalor, overcrowding, lack of adequate food and clothing and numerous violations of the Flores Settlement prohibiting prolonged detention of children. Inspectors met some detainees who said they were not given fresh drinking water.

== For-profit detention centers ==
The detention business is a multibillion-dollar industry. The ACLU and many activists say that financial incentives are driving the recent increase in detentions. In June 2019, ICE was detaining about 52,000 migrants housed in facilities spread across the country. The majority of them are operated by private prison companies with two of them, CoreCivic and GEO Group, holding the largest share of contracts. According to OpenSecrets, in 2018 they spent $1.6 million and $2.8 million, respectively, on lobbying and political contributions. Newsweek reports that 11 of the 17 members of Congress sitting on the committee that determined appropriations for ICE in 2019, including funding for contractors like GEO and CoreCivic, accepted private prison money to run their political campaigns. While Republicans are the main recipients, House Democrat Henry Cuellar has received more money from GEO and CoreCivic than any other committee member.

According to information obtained by NBC News, in July 2019 the number of detainees in private detention centers in Louisiana and Mississippi surged to nearly four times as many as were held in 2017. Southern Poverty Law Center immigration attorney Emily Trostle, one of only eight attorneys in Louisiana able to represent adult detainees for free, commented, "It seems like every week we hear of a new detention center which is either being opened or repurposed." NBC reports that immigration attorneys have referred to many of the new sites as "black holes," because they can lose track of their clients for days at a time when they are moved to a new location without notice.

Mississippi and Louisiana are part of a region known as an AOR, or area of responsibility, which also includes Alabama, Arkansas and Tennessee; it falls under the New Orleans Field Office. Data shows that the rate of detainees granted parole in the New Orleans AOR has decreased from 75.5 percent in 2016 to just 1.5 percent in 2018, the lowest parole rate of any AOR in the country. A 2019 investigative report stated that for-profit prisons "consistently and substantially" hold immigrants longer than public detention centers. The more people detained, the more money private contractors receive. In a 2019 budget proposal, ICE estimated a bed in a privately contracted detention facility to cost $148.43 per day. NBC News reports that in May the Southern Poverty Law Center sued Department of Homeland Security and ICE officials over the parole rate, "accusing the agency of violating its own protocols, which they argue requires the agency to release people who are not a flight risk or a danger to their community." A dozen plaintiffs are named, many of whom have been detained for months and some for as long as a year. In another class-action suit attorneys charge that their clients are being forced to work for "systematic and unlawful wage theft, unjust enrichment, and forced labor" because the detainees are being paid only a $1 a day or snacks instead of the $1 wage.

== Economic impact ==
Speaking at a private gathering in February 2020, acting White House chief of staff Mick Mulvaney stated, "We are desperate – desperate – for more people. We are running out of people to fuel the economic growth that we've had in our nation over the last four years. We need more immigrants," noting he was referring to legal immigration. During 2018 and 2019, the number of open jobs (total non-farm) averaged 7.2 million.

Economist Austan Goolsbee explained in October 2019 that GDP growth is a function of the number of people and income per person (productivity), and restricting immigration hurts both measures. Immigrants start companies at twice the rate of native Americans, and half the companies in the Fortune 500 were started by immigrants or their children; such innovation helps drive productivity. He opined: "The long-run health of the U.S. economy is in serious danger from a self-inflicted wound: The Trump Administration's big cuts in immigration." He cited statistics indicating immigration to the U.S. fell 70% in 2018 to only 200,000 people, the lowest level in more than a decade. If immigration stayed at that level rather than the typical 1 million per year, research from Moody's Analytics indicates GDP would be $1 trillion lower than it would otherwise be in a decade. Further, retirement programs such as Social Security and Medicare are funded by payroll taxes paid by workers; fewer workers means significant funding shortfalls for these programs.

The Economist reported in February 2020 that strong nominal wage gains experienced by lower-paid workers in 2019 may be due in part to restrictions on immigration, along with the low unemployment rate giving workers more bargaining power, and significant increases in state-level minimum wages over several years. However, nominal wages are increasing in many rich countries, even those with growing foreign-born populations. Further, the article cautioned: "As America ages, it will need a lot more people willing to work in health care. Study after study finds a positive association between immigration and long-run economic growth – and therefore, ultimately, the living standards of all Americans. The Trump Administration's immigration [restrictions] may achieve a temporary boost in wages of the low-paid now, but at a cost to the country's future prosperity."

Among the employed, the share of foreign-born workers increased from 17.0% in December 2016 to a peak of 17.8% in February 2019, before falling to 17.2% in January 2020. Among the civilian non-institutional population, the share of foreign-born persons rose from 16.3% in December 2016 to peaks of 16.9% in March 2018 and 2019, before falling to 16.3% in January 2020. The Economist also reported that: "For the first time in half a century America's immigrant population appears to be in sustained decline, both in absolute terms and as a share of the total."

== See also ==
- Racial views of Donald Trump
- Immigration to the United States
- Immigration reduction in the United States
- Central American Minors Program
- Deferred Action for Childhood Arrivals
- Immigration reform in the United States
- Mexico–United States border crisis
- Mexico–United States border wall
- Remigration#United States
- United States Refugee Admissions Program (USRAP)
- Deportation of Indian nationals under Donald Trump
