= Comrade in America =

2017 film directed by Amal Neerad

- Theatrical release poster
- Directed by: Amal Neerad
- Written by: Shibin Francis
- Produced by: Amal Neerad
- Starring: Dulquer Salmaan; Karthika Muralidharan; Siddique; Dileesh Pothan; Soubin Shahir; John Vijay; Chandini Sreedharan
- Cinematography: Renadive
- Edited by: Praveen Prabhakar
- Music by: Gopi Sundar
- Production company: Amal Neerad Productions
- Distributed by: A - Release (India), Josemon Simon (Overseas)
- Release date: 5 May 2017
- Running time: 134 minutes
- Country: India
- Language: Malayalam

Comrade in America (abbreviated as CIA) is a 2017 Indian Malayalam-language action adventure film directed by Amal Neerad, starring Dulquer Salmaan and Karthika Muralidharan in the lead roles. The music is composed by Gopi Sundar, and Renadive handles the cinematography. It received mixed to positive reviews from critics and became a box office success. The film revolves around the travel of Aji (Dulquer Salmaan), a communist from Kerala who travels to the United States illegally (a "donkey flight") via Latin America and the Mexican border to get to his girlfriend Sarah (Karthika Muralidharan) in time before she is forced to marry another person.

== Plot ==
Aji Mathew is a youngster from Pala, Kottayam and is a strong communist. He comes from a Kerala Congress Party family, where his rich father, Mathew, is a prominent leader in the party. Aji falls in love with Sarah, an American citizen who came to Kerala for her college studies. After getting to know one other, Sarah asks Aji to leave India and move to the US with her. Aji refuses the request, as his motherland has given him everything and he cannot live in a totally capitalistic country. Within weeks, he receives news from his comrade Hari that Sara's parents have taken her back to the United States and that she intends to marry another man. Aji desperately wants to meet with her, even if they cannot be married.

He finds out that there is no way that he can get a visa within the period of the marriage and so decides to illegally enter the United States through Mexico as suggested by his cousin Cyril, who is in America. Aji first goes to Nicaragua, where a visa is not needed. There, he meets Arul, a Sri Lankan Tamil taxi driver. Together, they decide to go to America. Then both travel to Reynosa in Mexico, where they find a guide to lead them across the borders safely.

Aji meets others in their group, who are also trying to cross over illegally. He becomes friends with Pallavi, a Malayalee in their group. The group is cheated by their guide, who robs them and escapes after the first day. Instead of dropping the plan, Akai, a Chinese man among them, says that he has a GPS and can find the route to the US. Through the journey, they encounter an armed gang, but they are defeated by the group with Aji's initiation for offence. Arul, after encountering an accident, decides to drop the plan and return to Nicaragua.

As the journey continues, they are found by surveillance drones. Aji, along with Pallavi, Akai, and Laden (a Pakistani immigrant), escape. The American police capture other illegal immigrants and are shown the dead body of Arul, asking if they know him. Aji and Laden are captured by the police after trying to cross the border to the US. As they are transported, the police vehicle gets into an accident, and both of them manage to escape. Pallavi then leaves Aji to proceed ahead.

Aji finds his cousin Cyril, who tells him that he met with Sarah, who told him that she has already rejected Aji and has agreed to marry the other man. He says she might have called Aji initially to self-validate her position with him before marrying another person. Aji, along with Cyril, goes to meet Sarah on her wedding day as his father had insisted, and Aji conveys to her that it was good that they separated, and the experience that his journey gave him was one of the most memorable in his life.

Later, when Aji is about to leave, Cyril says, "Our first love should never become successful! If it does, then our life will end there," and asks Aji to stay back, as he might get permanently banned from re-entering the US, and also says that if Aji wants to stay, he can make arrangements. Aji denies his offer and jokes to him that he has now found an alternative for a side dish for consuming alcoholic beverages and says that his homeland calls him.

On the plane, he meets Pallavi. She explains that she got arrested along with Akai, and both of them are getting deported back to India and China respectively. Pallavi and Aji then embark on their journey together back to India.

In a post-credits scene, it explains that Aji's political opinions were not a success either, since Kora Sir, the local Kerala Congress leader, won the election and so did Donald Trump in the US.

== Cast ==
- Dulquer Salmaan as Ajith "Ajjippaan" Mathew
- Karthika Muralidharan as Sarah Mary Kurien
- Chandini Sreedharan as Pallavi
- Siddique as Mathews, Ajith's father
- Parvathi T as Lissy
- Soubin Shahir as Joemon
- Dileesh Pothan as Hari
- Emmanuel Mani as Protestor
- Jinu Joseph as Cyril
- John Vijay as Arul Jebaraj Peter
- Sumit Naval as Che Guevara (Voice dubbed by Fahadh Faasil)
- Sal Yusuf as Karl Marx
- Maniyanpilla Raju as Babychan
- Sujith Shankar as Manoj
- Sandeep Narayanan as police officer
- Rosshan Chandra as Bus Driver
- Alencier Ley Lopez as Politician
- V. K. Sreeraman (Guest Appearance)
- Surabhi Lakshmi as Deepa
- Harilal as Priest Palai
- C. R. Omanakuttan as Kora Sir
- Paul Nguyen Cuong as Akai

== Soundtrack ==
Comrade in America

Soundtrack album by Gopi Sundar
- Released: 2017
- Genre: Film soundtrack
- Length: 17:07
- Label: Gopi Sundar Music Company
- Producer: Gopi Sundar

Gopi Sundar chronology
1971: Beyond Borders (2017)	Comrade in America (2017)	Sathya (2017)
External audio
- Official Audio Jukebox on YouTube

All the songs are composed by Gopi Sundar and are released online through the composer's own YouTube channel titled Gopi Sundar Music Company.

Track listing
No.	Title	Lyrics	Singer(s)	Length
1.	"Kannil Kannil"	Rafeeq Ahammed	Haricharan, Sayanora Philip	4:09
2.	"Dulquer Theme"		Gopi Sundar	2:21
3.	"Kerala Manninayi"	B. K. Harinarayanan	Dulquer Salmaan, Vaikom Vijayalakshmi, G. Sreeram	4:06
4.	"Vaanam Thilathilakkanu"	Rafeeq Ahammed, Carolina (Spanish), Mohammed Maqbool Mansoor (Hindi)	Dulquer Salmaan, Mohammed Maqbool Mansoor, Carolina	3:49
5.	"African Music Theme"		Gopi Sundar	1:14
6.	"Love Theme"		Gopi Sundar	0:22
7.	"Party Office Theme"		Gopi Sundar	0:28
8.	"CIA Sentiments Theme"		Gopi Sundar	0:54

== Reception ==
=== Critical response ===
Comrade in America received mixed to positive reviews from critics. Writing for Times of India, Sanjith Sidhardhan said that "The film is an entertaining affair, which has humour, drama, great visuals, a good soundtrack and most of all, a splendid performance by Dulquer." Anu James of International Business Times gave 3.5 stars out of five and wrote that "Comrade in America is an entertaining flick with Dulquer's impressive performance, few one-liners, beautiful picturisation, catchy music and after all with Amal Neerad touch. It is not just a movie to hail communism, and degrade others; communism just exists in the background that becomes the life for Aji, unlike what we have seen in Oru Mexican Aparatha or Sakhavu." Prem Udayabhanu of Malayala Manorama writes "Dulquer Salmaan is ushered in with the aura of a mass appearance and that sets the tempo of narrative, which also hinges on a beautiful father-son portrayal, though they are opposite poles in the political spectrum."

Elizabeth Thomas, in her review for Deccan Chronicle, gave 3.5 stars out of five and wrote that "CIA is, in many ways, a fresh attempt by Amal Neerad. It is different from his usual making style. The script by Shibin Francis takes a fresh plot, which makes the story interesting. Aji’s journey is told in a different tone and set in a new landscape, which is unfamiliar to the Malayali audience. Aji’s mass entry and his power-packed and quick-witted dialogues lift the mood of the movie."

== See also ==
- Lal Salam (1990)
- Arabikkatha (2007)
- Sakhavu (2017)
- Oru Mexican Aparatha (2017)
- Kala Viplavam Pranayam (2018)
- Thuramukham (2023)
- Dunki (2023)
