= Karthika Muralidharan =

Indian actress

- Born: 18 January 1997 (age 29); Kottayam, Kerala, India
- Education: Srishti School of Art Design and Technology
- Occupation: Actress
- Years active: 2017 – present
- Parents: C. K. Muraleedharan; Meena Nair
- Relatives: Akash Muraleedhan (brother)

Karthika Muralidharan (born 18 January 1997) is an Indian actress who works in Malayalam film industry. She made her acting debut in 2017 with the Malayalam film Comrade in America co-starring Dulquer Salmaan. Her second movie was Uncle co-starring Mammootty. She is the daughter of cinematographer C. K. Muraleedharan.

== Filmography ==
Year	Film	Role	Language	Ref.
2017	Comrade in America	Sarah Mary Kurien	Malayalam	
2018	Uncle	Shruthi Vijayan	Malayalam	
2023	Saba Nayagan	Deepthi/Esha	Tamil	
