= Uncle (2018 film) =

2018 film

- Directed by: Girish Damodar
- Written by: Joy Mathew
- Produced by: Joy Mathew; Sajai Sebastian
- Starring: Mammootty; Joy Mathew; Karthika Muralidharan; Muthumani
- Cinematography: Alagappan N.
- Music by: Bijibal
- Production companies: SJ Films; ABRA Movies
- Release date: 27 April 2018
- Country: India
- Language: Malayalam

Uncle is a 2018 Indian Malayalam-language drama thriller film directed by Girish Damodar and produced by Joy Mathew and Sajai Sebastian under the banner of SJ Films. It stars Mammootty and Karthika Muralidharan in the lead roles, and Joy Mathew and Muthumani in supporting roles. It was released on 27 April 2018 and was an average success at the box office.

== Plot ==
Shruthi, a student at Ooty college, is forced to return home to Kozhikode due to the dangerous strikes at the location. Coincidentally, she meets Krishnakumar (KK), her father's family friend, who offers her a ride back home. She reluctantly accepts this offer, as she has no other safe option.

During the 6-hour drive, KK, whom Shruthi affectionately calls "Uncle", and Shruthi listen to music, tell stories, and look at the scenery. However, KK makes suspicious calls and talks to suspicious people throughout the trip, leading the audience to believe that Shruthi's safety may be compromised.

Her father back home is understandably worried, and he fears that he doesn't know KK as well as he thought he did. However, her mother convinces her father that Shruthi is alright as both Shruthi and KK are calling home regularly and sound happy over the phone. Their fear heightens when KK and Shruthi stay at a Tamilian house overnight, where KK is given a bottle of alcohol and Shruthi's phone is taken away. However, nothing bad happens; in fact, the host family takes care of Shruthi well and gives back her phone, fully charged. KK tells Shruthi that the Tamilians are leaders of the village, and that she has nothing to worry about.

Meanwhile, Shruthi's father sends her friend Sam to follow KK's car throughout the trip. Shruthi discovers this and invites Sam to ride with them. This fear peaks when KK leaves Sam behind after filling up his car. Now, Shruthi gets even more worried and calls home more frequently.

After passing the Kerala-Tamil Nadu border, KK pulls out a pouch of something that looks like crack cocaine, from his pocket, which he found in Sam's bag. He shows it to Shruthi, which justifies why he left Sam behind.

After this, KK offers some of the alcohol that he got from the Tamilians for Shruthi to taste. Shruthi gets worried at first, but she discovers that the “alcohol” is actually rare honey, which her mother asked KK to bring. Now, Shruthi realizes that she can entrust even her entire life to this uncle. To celebrate, KK takes Shruthi to a special lake, with her parents’ permission. The two are caught taking selfies together by the villagers, who report them to the police under a false pretense that they were in a compromising situation.

Shruthi's parents come to the station to convince the officer and villagers that she was in the hands of a trusted caregiver. The positive outcome of this ordeal cements Shruthi's parents' faith in KK. Although the last scene may appear silly, it is a real issue prevalent in India today, and this film seeks to address that.

== Cast ==
- Mammootty as Krishnakumar, also known as KK
- Joy Mathew as Vijayan, Shruthi's father
- Karthika Muralidharan as Shruthi
- Muthumani as Lakshmi, Shruthi's mother
- Suresh Krishna as Vishwan

== Soundtrack ==
- Entha Johnsa Kallille...

song by Mammootty

== Reception ==
Times of India gave 4 out of 5 stars and wrote, "Uncle comes at a time when society is confused and striving to break free from conventions and prejudices. It spreads hope, a commodity that was never needed more than at this point of time."

Deccan Chronicle rated the film 3 out of 5 and wrote, "Girish Damodar, on his debut, appears a promising director, with his well-planned making, eliminating unwanted sequences. The cinematography, editing and background score also deserve due credit."

Anna M. M. Vetticad of firstpost rated the film 2.5/5 stars and wrote, "When it is at its best, Uncle: My Dad's Friend is an excellent psychological drama bordering on a work of genius. By making needless overt attempts to manipulate the audience though, it robs itself of its potential greatness."
