= Donkey flight =

Technique for an illegal border crossing

Donkey flight ("dunki" in Punjabi) is an illegal immigration technique used for unauthorized entry into countries such as the United States, Canada, United Kingdom, and Australia.

== Background ==
The term originates from a Punjabi idiom dunki meaning "to hop from place to place," where unscrupulous "travel agencies" exploit individuals' aspirations for foreign travel, promising visas in exchange for hefty payments.

Many young people divert substantial funds to pay for these journeys. These families become victims of deception as they pay for promised visas.

== Operation ==
The approach is used for immigration to many countries.

- Conmen exploit migrants by facilitating illegal border crossings, using methods such as containers and ships. Agents apprehend migrants at borders, leading to deportation.
- Agents provide forged documents, including residency permits and driving licenses. Less affluent migrants are often smuggled into the US, emphasizing the clandestine and perilous nature of the "Donkey Flight" scam.

== In popular media ==
- Comrade in America (2017) revolves around the 'Donkey Flight' travel of the protagonist to reach the United States.
- Aaja Mexico Challiye (2022) showcases how the protagonist tries to reach the United States through a donkey route.
- Dunki (2023) showcases a group of friends trying to reach the United Kingdom through a donkey route.

== See also ==
- Deportation of Indian nationals under Donald Trump
- Illegal immigration
- Illegal immigration to the United States
- Illegal immigration to Canada
- Illegal immigration to the United Kingdom
- Illegal entry
