= C. K. Muraleedharan =

Indian cinematographer

- Born: Kerala, India
- Education: Film and Television Institute of India
- Occupation: Cinematographer
- Years active: 1987 — present
- Spouse: Meena Nair
- Children: Karthika Muralidharan; Aakash Muraleedharan
- Website: muraleedharanck.com

C. K. Muraleedharan is an Indian cinematographer who works in Hindi films.

== Early life ==
He graduated from the Film and Television Institute of India, Pune in 1987 with a specialisation in Cinematography.

== Career ==
Having worked in several short movies, commercials and television since 1987, Muraleedharan, made his debut on the silver screen with the Bollywood film Ek Chhotisi Love Story in 2002.

== Personal life ==
He is married to Meena Nair. They have two children—Karthika Muralidharan and Aakash Muraleedharan. His daughter Karthika is an actress in the Malayalam film industry. He has conducted a research project on the History and Practice of Cinematography in India, along with Raqs Media Collective for the India Foundation for the Arts.

== Filmography ==
Year	Film	Language	Notes
2001	Colours Black	English	
2002	A Very Very Silent Film	English	
2002	Bollywood Bound	English	
2002	Ek Chhotisi Love Story	Hindi	
2004	Ek Hasina Thi	Hindi	
2006	Lage Raho Munna Bhai	Hindi	
2007	Johnny Gaddaar	Hindi	
2009	3 Idiots	Hindi	
2012	Agent Vinod	Hindi	
2014	PK	Hindi	
2016	School Bus	Malayalam	
2016	Mohenjo Daro	Hindi	
2019	Panipat	Hindi	
2023	Dream Girl 2	Hindi	
2023	Dunki	Hindi	
