= Dunki (film) =

2023 Indian film by Rajkumar Hirani

- Theatrical release poster
- Directed by: Rajkumar Hirani
- Written by: Rajkumar Hirani; Abhijat Joshi; Kanika Dhillon
- Produced by: Gauri Khan; Rajkumar Hirani
- Starring: Shah Rukh Khan; Taapsee Pannu; Boman Irani; Vicky Kaushal; Vikram Kochhar; Anil Grover
- Cinematography: C. K. Muraleedharan; Manush Nandan; Amit Roy
- Edited by: Rajkumar Hirani
- Music by: Songs: Pritam; Score: Aman Pant
- Production companies: Jio Studios; Red Chillies Entertainment; Rajkumar Hirani Films
- Distributed by: see below
- Release date: 21 December 2023
- Running time: 161 minutes
- Country: India
- Language: Hindi
- Budget: ₹85 crore (Note: According to DNA India, the budget of the film was ₹85 crore.)
- Box office: est. ₹470.6 crore

Dunki (Note: The Punjabi word "dunki" means "to hop from place to place" and refers to donkey flight.) is a 2023 Indian Hindi-language comedy-drama film based on the illegal immigration technique donkey flight, co-written, co-produced, edited and directed by Rajkumar Hirani, under Rajkumar Hirani Films, along with Jio Studios and Red Chillies Entertainment. It stars Shah Rukh Khan, Taapsee Pannu, Boman Irani, Anil Grover and Vikram Kochar alongside Vicky Kaushal in a special appearance.

The film was officially announced in April 2022. Principal photography began the same month and occurred sporadically in several legs. It wrapped by late-April 2023, and filming locations included Mumbai, Jabalpur, Kashmir, Budapest, London, Jeddah and Neom. The film's songs were primarily composed by Pritam. Shekhar Ravjiani served as a guest composer. The film score was composed by Aman Pant, the cinematography was handled by C. K. Muraleedharan, Manush Nandan, Amit Roy, with the editing by Hirani himself.

Dunki was theatrically released worldwide on 21 December 2023. The film received mixed reviews from critics and audiences. Dunki grossed ₹470.6 crore worldwide against a budget of ₹120 crore (US$13 million), emerging as the fifth highest-grossing Hindi film of 2023 and the eighth highest-grossing Indian film of 2023. At the 69th Filmfare Awards, the film received nine nominations, and won Best Supporting Actor for Kaushal.

== Plot ==
In 2020 London, Manu Randhawa escapes a hospital and approaches immigration attorney Puru Patel to secure an Indian travel visa. Puru explains that her previous asylum claim, wherein she legally testified that her life was in danger in India, makes repatriation virtually impossible. Terminally ill with brain cancer and desperate to die in her homeland, Manu contacts her former lover, Hardayal "Hardy" Singh Dhillon, in Punjab after a 25-year separation. Manu requests that Hardy meet her, Buggu Lakhanpal, and Balli Kakkad in Dubai to orchestrate a covert return to India, prompting a lengthy flashback to 1995.

In Laltu, Punjab, impoverished and uneducated friends Manu, Buggu, and Balli desperately seek to immigrate to England to alleviate their families' financial distress. Hardy, a disciplined ex-soldier from the Indian Army, arrives in the village to return a debt of gratitude to Manu's late brother, who had saved his life. Learning of the family's plight, Hardy commits to fulfilling Manu’s migration goals. After being defrauded by a rogue travel agent, the group enrolls in an ineffective English coaching center to clear the IELTS exam for student visas. There, they befriend Sukhi, who is desperate to rescue his ex-girlfriend from an abusive marriage in London.

Only Balli passes the examination and relocates to England, sending back deceptive photographs to imply immense material success. The illusion collapses when Sukhi learns his ex-girlfriend has committed suicide out of despair over his exam failure; a distraught Sukhi subsequently commits suicide. Devastated by the tragedy, Hardy vows to bypass the restrictive visa apparatus entirely, leading Manu and Buggu to London via the highly perilous, illegal backdoor immigration route known as the "Donkey Flight" (Dunki).

The transit proves harrowing, involving lethal border crossings through deserts, mountains, and a suffocating 27-day confinement inside a cargo container that claims the lives of three fellow refugees. Upon arriving in London, they discover a disillusioned Balli working menial jobs to survive; his certified college was a fraudulent front. To gain legal residency, Puru advises Manu to enter a sham marriage. When Hardy violently intervenes to protect her from an aggressive groom, the group is apprehended.

To avoid deportation, Puru urges them to exploit British asylum jurisprudence by falsely claiming state-sponsored persecution in India. Hardy, bound by fierce patriotism, refuses to fabricate anti-national allegations and delivers a scathing courtroom critique of a global border system that criminalizes poverty. While the court orders Hardy's immediate deportation, Manu, Buggu, and Balli reluctantly accept the asylum terms, eventually obtaining British citizenship.

In the present, Hardy learns of Manu's terminal diagnosis. Denied legal entry into India due to her political asylum status, Manu and the group rendezvous with Hardy in Dubai. To circumvent the border restriction without subjecting Manu to the physical trauma of another illegal overland trek, Hardy orchestrates a calculated counter-strategy. He arranges for the group to surrender their British passports and board a shipping container in Jeddah, Saudi Arabia, bound for Europe.

Per Hardy's instructions, a local agent intentionally tips off the Saudi authorities. During interrogation, Hardy misleads officials into believing they are undocumented Indian nationals attempting to infiltrate Europe. This structural ruse forces the Saudi government to deport them directly back to India, successfully fulfilling Hardy’s promise to repatriate Manu via a commercial flight rather than a lethal border crossing.

Returning to Laltu, the friends witness the structural improvements their remittances brought to their families. Hardy confesses his lifelong love and proposes to Manu. Overwhelmed with joy, Manu accepts, but succumbs to her illness moments later. The film concludes with an epilogue detailing the global reality of undocumented migration, highlighting the millions who perish anonymously on donkey flights, never returning to their homelands.

== Cast ==
- Shah Rukh Khan as Hardayal "Hardy" Singh Dhillon
- Taapsee Pannu as Manu Randhawa
- Boman Irani as Geetu Gulati
- Vikram Kochhar as Buggu Lakhanpal
- Anil Grover as Balli Kakkad
- Vicky Kaushal as Sukhwinder "Sukhi" Singh (special appearance)
- Jyoti Subhash as Santosh Lakhanpal, Buggu's grandmother
- Deven Bhojani as Advocate Puru Patel
- Manoj Kant as Manu's father
  - Arun Bali as Manu's older father
- Amardeep Jha as Manu's mother
- Suhail Zargar as Mahinder Randhawa, Manu's brother
- Jaanvi Sangwan as Mahinder's wife
- Vishnu Kaushal as Gulab Nagra
- Komal Sachdeva as Chameli Nagra
- Diwanshu Gambhir as Parminder "Pumpi" Dingra
- Rohitashv Gour as a Fake Visa Agent at Laltu
- Piyush Raina as Bobby Dhabewala
- Jitendra Hooda as an Indian Dunki Agent
- Mushari Alatawi as an Iranian Dunki Agent
- Shahid Latief as Bakir, an Emirati Dunki Agent
- Mahavir Bhullar as Buggu's father
- Sapna Sand as Buggu's mother
- Jatinder Kaur as Balli's mother
- Jeremy Wheeler as the Judge of Illegal Immigrants Court in England
- Jay Miller as Church Priest
- Arpa Attila as Buggu's Employer in London
- Richard B. Klein as IELTS Examiner
- Nikhil Ratnaparkhi as a Thief at Laltu Railway Station
- Karim Saidi as Omar Abbassi, Saudi Arabian Police Officer
- Ranjha Vikram Singh as a Shop Purchaser (cameo appearance)
- Gurpreet Ghuggi as a Co-passenger at Laltu Railway Station (cameo appearance)

== Production ==
=== Development ===
In late November 2020, Rajkumar Hirani, who had previously approached Shah Rukh Khan for the roles in the films Munna Bhai M.B.B.S. (2003) and 3 Idiots (2009), which were rejected by Khan, was reported to join hands with the latter for his next directorial. Hirani narrated the story to Khan during the COVID-19 lockdown in 2020. The film marks Khan's first collaboration with Hirani. By August 2021, the screenplay was completed and the film was announced in April 2022. Hirani co-wrote the film with Abhijat Joshi and Kanika Dhillon. Cinematographer Amit Roy was chosen first, but he left the film due to creative differences with Hirani and was replaced by C. K. Muraleedharan. This marks his fourth collaboration with Hirani after Lage Raho Munna Bhai (2006), 3 Idiots (2009) and PK (2014). As per reports Manush Nandan, Amit Roy and Pankaj Kumar also worked on the film as cinematographers.

=== Casting ===
Mukesh Chhabra was the casting director. Taapsee Pannu was cast as the female lead in January 2021 marking her first onscreen collaboration with Khan. Khan's Red Chillies Entertainment produced her film Badla (2019). Vicky Kaushal was announced to be playing a significant role in the film. Boman Irani joined the cast in October 2022.

=== Filming ===
Principal photography commenced in April 2022 in Mumbai. The Mumbai schedule ended in June 2022 and the international schedules commenced in July 2022. Filming took place in Budapest and London in July 2022, and was completed a month later. A bike sequence featuring Khan was filmed in Mumbai in October 2022. A 12-day schedule took place in November 2022 in Saudi Arabia, which included the locations Jeddah and Neom. In Riyadh, few shots were taken of the Al Rajhi Grand Mosque, which was shown in the film as part of Jeddah's skyline whereas the Al-Hukm Palace was depicted as the building of a Saudi immigration court. A three-day schedule happened in Jabalpur, Madhya Pradesh in December 2022. In January 2023, the underwater sequence featuring Khan was filmed in Mumbai. Meanwhile, Khan who was also working on another project Jawan finished his shooting in April 2023. The same month, the team moved to Kashmir for a four-day schedule that took place in Srinagar, Pampore, Sonamarg including Thajwas glacier and Pulwama. A song sequence was shot in Kashmir choreographed by Ganesh Acharya. The filming was wrapped up in Sonamarg, Kashmir by April 2023. The film was shot over 75 days out of which Khan shot for 60 days. The film is reportedly budgeted at ₹120 crore, including the marketing cost.

== Soundtrack ==
The songs in the film were composed by Pritam. Shekhar Ravjiani served as a guest composer. The background score was composed by Aman Pant. The first single titled "Lutt Putt Gaya" was released on 22 November 2023. The second single titled "Nikle The Kabhi Hum Ghar Se" was released on 1 December 2023. The third single titled "O Maahi" was released on 11 December 2023. The fourth single titled "Banda" was released on 18 December 2023. The soundtrack album featuring eight songs was released by T-Series on 18 December 2023.

== Marketing ==
The film's teaser titled "Dunki: Drop 1" was released on 2 November 2023 coinciding with Khan's 58th birthday. In all, 8 "Drops" were released one after another. Drop 2 was released on 22 November as the song "Lutt Putt Gaya". Drop 3 was released on 1 December as the song "Nikle The Kabhi Hum Ghar Se". The film's trailer titled "Dunki: Drop 4" was released on 5 December 2023. Drop 5 was released on 11 December as the song "O Maahi". A promotional event was held in Dubai on 17 December. Drop 6 was released on 18 December as the song "Banda". "Dunki: Drop 7" was released on 27 December as the song "Main Tera Rasta Dekhunga". "Dunki: Drop 8" was released on 4 January 2024 as the song "Chal ve Watna".

== Release ==
=== Theatrical ===
Dunki was theatrically released on 21 December 2023.

=== Distribution ===
Pen Studios acquired the theatrical rights for North India and West India under the Pen Marudhar Entertainment banner. Sree Gokulam Movies acquired theatrical distribution rights of the film in Tamil Nadu and Kerala, Rajshri Pictures distributed it in Andhra Pradesh and Telangana. Mysore territory rights was acquired by Panorama Studios. SVF acquired the theatrical rights for West Bengal.

The overseas distribution rights were sold to Yash Raj Films. Home Screen Entertainment bought Singapore distribution rights of the film, while Lighthouse Distribution acquired the distribution rights for Spain. Action Cut Entertainment distributed the film in Bangladesh.

=== Home media ===
The combined value of the digital, satellite, and music rights of the film was ₹230 crore. The film began streaming on Netflix from 15 February 2024.

== Reception ==
=== Box office ===
Dunki had the 13th-biggest advance booking of all time for a Hindi film. On its opening day, it collected a net total of ₹28 crore (US$3.0 million) in India and ₹58 crore (US$6.2 million) worldwide. It had net domestic collections of ₹20 crore (US$2.1 million), worldwide collection ₹45.40 crore (US$4.9 million) and a net ₹24.5 crore (US$2.6 million) and worldwide collection ₹53.82 crore (US$5.7 million) on its second and third day, respectively. Dunki ended its run with ₹262.25 crore (US$28 million) in India, while ₹212.42 crore (US$23 million) net in Hindi and become 27th highest Hindi net collection, with a further ₹208.35 crore (US$22 million) in overseas, for a worldwide total of ₹470.6 crore (US$50 million). Dunki managed to sold 12 million tickets and overall 8.6 crore in this year for Khan. It became highest grossing comedy film of post pandemic era and also became eighth highest grossing Indian film and fifth highest gross Hindi film in 2023.

=== Critical response ===
Dunki received mixed reviews from critics and audiences. On the review aggregator website Rotten Tomatoes, 48% of 23 critics' reviews are positive, with an average rating of 6.1/10. The website's consensus reads: "Dunki's got good intentions and no shortage of heart, but its uneven tonal blend and shallow treatment of serious themes undermines the intended effect."

Tushar Joshi of India Today gave 4/5 stars and wrote "Dunki might not be Hirani's best work in comparison to 3 Idiots or PK, but it still entertains and leaves you with a warm and fuzzy feeling". Sreeparna Sengupta of The Times of India also gave 4/5 stars and wrote, "Dunki's story is an emotional one - rolling in friendship, romance, heart-wrenching and heart-warming moments all into one. And in trademark Hirani style, there are dollops of comedy which is laced with satire to make it an entertaining ride, along with the strong message the film brings forth". A reviewer for Pinkvilla considered it "a modern-day classic", but was critical of the film's pace. A reviewer from Bollywood Hungama awarded the film 3.5/5 stars and wrote "Dunki bears the Rajkumar Hirani stamp of filmmaking with the right message and emotions as a backdrop. However, it is not as outstanding as his previous films as the writing plays spoilsport to a great extent." Filmfare's Devesh Sharma was pleased by the film's messaging of "a world beyond borders", and praised the performances of Khan and Pannu. Monika Rawal Kukreja of Hindustan Times labelled it a "heartwarming tale that's high on emotions", but despite praising the performances of Khan and Pannu, she was displeased with their chemistry. Proma Khosla of IndieWire rated the film C+ and wrote "In the end, Dunki undermines its own messaging, sandwiching a series of informative cards about donkey flights between a rushed conclusion and comedic coda."

NDTV's Saibal Chatterjee believed that the film's strength lay in its ability to not be in service of Khan's stardom, instead allowing the supporting cast to shine, particularly Vicky Kaushal. A reviewer for Film Companion also believed that Kaushal's special appearance had enhanced the "simplistic" film. Writing for The Hindu, Anuj Kumar considered Dunki "not the best of Hirani but has just about enough to make you chuckle and churn". Mint Lounge's Uday Bhatia compared it negatively to The Dupes (1973), a Syrian film about border crossing, writing that unlike that film, Dunki "is only interested in illegal immigration and the refugee crisis to the extent that it allows Hirani and Khan to grandstand".

Sukanya Verma of Rediff.com rated the film 2.5/5 and opined, "Dunki is high on ambition but its flimsy premise renders this nearly three hours long journey into farfetched adventures hard to believe, harder to buy into". Nandini Ramnath of Scroll.in dismissed the film as "flat and unfunny", adding that the "strangely anodyne film is briefly enlivened by Khan's dimpled charm and spirited turns by Taapsee Pannu, Vikram Kocchar and Anil Grover". Shubhra Gupta of The Indian Express gave 1.5/5 stars and criticised it as a "crashing bore" and considered it Hirani's weakest film.

Internationally, Manjusha Radhakrishnan of Gulf News rated the film 4/5 and wrote "Illegal immigration and unauthorised cross-border migrant crossings are grim issues, but director Rajkumar Hirani humanized them with an emotionally engaging tale". David Tusing of The National wrote "With Dunki, Khan takes on a poignant immigration tale with a whole lot of heart that's bound to strike a chord with audiences".

== Accolades ==
Award	Ceremony date	Category	Recipients	Result	Ref.
Filmfare Awards	28 January 2024	Best Actor	Shah Rukh Khan	Nominated	
Filmfare Awards	28 January 2024	Best Actress	Taapsee Pannu	Nominated	
Filmfare Awards	28 January 2024	Best Supporting Actor	Vicky Kaushal	Won	
Filmfare Awards	28 January 2024	Best Music Director	Pritam	Nominated	
Filmfare Awards	28 January 2024	Best Lyricist	Javed Akhtar for "Nikle The Kabhi Hum Ghar Se"	Nominated	
Filmfare Awards	28 January 2024	Best Lyricist	Swanand Kirkire and IP Singh for "Lutt Putt Gaya"	Nominated	
Filmfare Awards	28 January 2024	Best Male Playback Singer	Arijit Singh for "Lutt Putt Gaya"	Nominated	
Filmfare Awards	28 January 2024	Best Male Playback Singer	Sonu Nigam for "Nikle The Kabhi Hum Ghar Se"	Nominated	
Filmfare Awards	28 January 2024	Best Choreography	Ganesh Acharya for "Lutt Putt Gaya"	Nominated	
International Indian Film Academy Awards	28 September 2024	Best Actress	Taapsee Pannu	Nominated	
International Indian Film Academy Awards	28 September 2024	Best Lyricist	Javed Akhtar – "Nikle The Kabhi Hum Ghar Se"	Nominated	
International Indian Film Academy Awards	28 September 2024	Best Lyricist	Swanand Kirkire, IP Singh – "Lutt Putt Gaya"	Nominated	
International Indian Film Academy Awards	28 September 2024	Best Male Playback Singer	Diljit Dosanjh – "Banda"	Nominated	
