= Central American Minors Program =

American immigration policy

The Central American Minors (CAM) Refugee and Parole Program is a U.S. refugee and parole program established in November 2014 by the Obama administration. It is a refugee protection and family reunification pathway on which several thousand families rely and for which tens of thousands more families are technically eligible. The CAM Program was designed to permit certain children and other eligible family members to escape life-threatening danger and other humanitarian crises and to reunite with parents or relatives in the United States. This program provides certain qualified parents and legal guardians to apply for their children and other eligible family members, who are nationals of and physically present in El Salvador, Guatemala, and Honduras, to come to the United States as refugees or parolees. The CAM Program has been operational from 2014 to 2017-18 when it was terminated over a series of actions; and from 2021 to the present, when it was restarted in two phases, first for some previously closed cases and then for new applications. To date, most CAM Program beneficiaries have been Salvadoran families of Temporary Protected Status (TPS) holders, making up 86 percent of applicants from the 2014–2017. Since the Biden administration restarted the CAM Program for new applications, the CAM Program has had expanded eligibility criteria, including parents and guardians with pending asylum applications or U visa petitions, which should enable many more Guatemalans and Hondurans to apply.

The CAM Program was created as a response to a then-significant increase in the number of Salvadoran, Guatemalan, and Honduran children and youth apprehended on the U.S.-Mexico border. The U.S. government has touted the program as one part of a Latin America regional migration strategy that includes legal pathways for those needing protection. Critics highlight that it excludes many children and youth because of their parents’ status in the United States; and that it requires individuals fleeing persecution to remain in the country of persecution during the entire process to remain eligible. After the program was terminated during the Trump administration, the Biden administration reopened it, expanded eligibility bases, and is defending the program against a legal challenge brought by 15 states.

== History ==
=== Obama administration ===
During the summer of 2014, a then-significant rise in the number of unaccompanied children fleeing violence and danger in El Salvador, Guatemala, and Honduras led former President Barack Obama to create another mechanism to deter children from coming to the United States by land by providing a selective alternative means to reach the United States and to reunify with family. CAM began accepting applications in December 2014. In 2016, the Obama administration expanded the program to include a broader category of people eligible to enter the United States to include siblings over the age of 21, in-country parents of qualified children, and other caregivers who accompanied minor children. All of these relatives must also prove that they qualify as a refugee to be resettled or they must be granted parole to enter the United States. The expansion included the Protection Transfer Agreement, through which the Costa Rican government agreed to temporarily host at most 200 people at a time who were in greatest need of protection during the CAM process.

By March 2017, about 12,100 people had applied for the program in the roughly 27 months since it began. Roughly 30% of applicants whose cases reached their conclusion were resettled as refugees, 69% were paroled into the United States, while 1% of applicants were denied. Most of these applications were filed by Salvadoran parents holding Temporary Protected Status (TPS). By March 2017, United States Citizenship and Immigration Services (USCIS) had issued decisions in approximately half of the filed cases. By August 2017, approximately half of the CAM applicants with decisions finished in-country processing and were reunited with their families in the United States (1,627 as refugees and 1,465 as parolees). At the end of 2016, roughly 2,000 cases were being interviewed every three months. At this time, about two years into the CAM Program's operation, the average processing time for a case was 331 days from the time an application was filed with the Department of State (DOS) to the date of travel to the US.

=== Trump administration ===
Through a series of actions, former President Donald Trump ended the CAM Program in a way ultimately found to be impermissible under the law. An executive order on border security signed by Trump days after he took office in January 2017 triggered a review of the CAM Program. This review put more than 2,700 CAM applicants’ cases on hold despite their having been granted conditional approval for parole into the United States. A notice published in the Federal Register announced that the government would end the process of granting parole as of August 16, 2017. The review terminated the parole portion of the CAM Program. As part of the review of the U.S. Refugee Admissions Program for 2018, the remaining portion of the CAM Program was terminated. On November 9, 2017, DOS stopped accepting new CAM Program applications, and on January 31, 2018, USCIS stopped interviewing new CAM cases.

On June 13, 2018, a complaint was filed in the Northern District of California, S.A. v. Trump, which challenged the August 2017 decision to terminate the CAM parole program. An Order for Permanent Injunction issued on May 17, 2019, required USCIS to reopen and continue processing certain CAM parole cases under the prior policies and procedures. The cases that were reopened were limited to those whose applicants had received a conditional parole approval notice that was rescinded when Trump unlawfully terminated the program from these applicants.

=== Biden administration ===
On March 10, 2021, the Department of State announced the Phase One reopening of the CAM Program, which restarted the processing of some cases that were closed in 2017 or later, specifically those cases closed without an interview after January 31, 2018. Domestic resettlement agencies contacted parents who previously submitted an application to verify ongoing eligibility and determine whether they wished to reopen the case.

On June 15, 2021, the Department of State and the Department of Homeland Security announced details regarding Phase Two of reopening the CAM program. Under Phase Two, the government would accept new applications and applications under expanded eligibility criteria. Specifically, legal guardians could apply in addition to parents and the parent/guardian could be eligible based on a pending asylum application or U visa petition filed before May 15, 2021, in addition to the previously qualifying bases. On September 13, 2021, the U.S. Refugee Admissions Program began accepting new CAM applications under Phase Two. Since the CAM Program was reopened, only a few hundred new applications have been filed, of the tens of thousands of eligible families, with no beneficiaries traveling to the United States within the year of CAM Phase Two beginning.

Several advocacy organizations evaluated the CAM Program one year into the Phase Two restart and identified several problems–all consistent with problems identified by the USCIS Ombudsman in 2016 and by many other advocacy organizations since CAM's establishment – including: bottlenecks in accessing CAM, which prevent large numbers of eligible people from applying; lengthy processing timelines, which prolong the time individuals are at risk of or experiencing harm; and lack of assistance to counsel and lack of transparency in the process, which risk unfair or erroneous legal adjudications. Some steps that have been recommended for the administration to take to allow for greater access to the CAM Program include: establishing meaningful access to the program; decreasing processing times; and ensuring fair legal adjudication by granting access to counsel as well as implementing measures to increase transparency.

== Implementation ==
Only certain parents or legal guardians in the United States may request access to the program for qualifying children and eligible family members. There are no fees associated with applying to the CAM Program, however there are costs at several stages of the process, such as medical exams and travel for parolees.

=== Eligibility ===
Parents and guardians may be eligible for the CAM Program if they are at least 18 years old and legally present in the United States in any of the following categories: lawful permanent resident; Temporary Protected Status; parole for at least one year; deferred action for at least one year; deferred enforced departure; withholding of removal; pending asylum application or pending U nonimmigrant visa petition filed prior to May 15, 2021. The parent must be in one of these categories when they file the Affidavit of Relationship (AOR) for the qualifying child or any other eligible family members. If they are not in one of these categories, they must have received asylum or had their U visa petition approved.

A child qualifies for the CAM Program if they are unmarried, under the age of 21, a national of El Salvador, Guatemala, or Honduras, and physically present in one of those countries. Eligible family members include the children of qualifying children, siblings of qualifying children, certain parents and caretakers of qualifying children, among other members of the household, with some nuances. Eligible family members may have access to the program when included with the qualifying child if they are: unmarried children of the qualifying child who are located in-country; unmarried children under 21 of the qualifying child; or in-country parent of the qualifying child if they qualify under the below criteria; children of the qualifying parent located in the United States who are married or 21 or older; or a primary caregiver of the qualifying child.

An in-country parent qualifies if they are part of the same household and economic unit as the qualifying child, legally married to the qualifying parent in the U.S. at the time the qualifying parent files the AOR, and is still legally married to the qualifying parent at the time of admission or parole to the U.S. An in-country parent of the qualifying child who is not legally married to the qualifying parent located in the United States may be included if they are the biological parent of the qualifying child, and part of the same household and economic unit as the qualifying child. In-country parents who qualify, under either of these circumstances, have their own case and can include their unmarried children under 21 who are not the child of the qualifying parent located in the United States, and the qualifying in-country biological parent may also include their legal spouse on their case.

In the case of a legal guardian filing the AOR for a qualifying child, the legal guardian cannot include an in-country parent of the qualifying child, but they can include siblings of the qualifying child. The legal guardian can also include a primary caregiver of the qualifying child, but only if the caregiver is related to the qualifying child. If the qualifying parent in the United States has children who are married or are 21 years old or older, these children have their own case and can include their legal spouse and unmarried children under 21 years old.

A primary caregiver of the qualifying child is given access to the CAM Program if: they are related to the qualifying parent located in the United States biologically or by legal marriage; or the qualifying child by a biological, step, or adoptive relationship. The caregiver must also be part of the same household and economic unit as the qualifying child.

=== Application process ===
To apply for the CAM Program, parents and guardians must submit an AOR through their local U.S. Resettlement Agency (RA) or through the designated entities with authority to prepare and submit AORs nationally. Once the application is filed, the International Organization for Migration (IOM), which manages the Resettlement Support Center - Latin America, contacts the qualifying child and eligible family members included in the application to schedule a pre-screen interview, conducted by IOM. The next step is DNA testing, which is required for all family members with a putative biological relationship. Any child that is legally adopted can be claimed and is eligible for the CAM Program and will not be subject to DNA testing.

If the DNA testing confirms the biological relationship, then IOM schedules the DHS (USCIS) refugee interview. This interview is used to determine if the individual is eligible for refugee status. If approved for refugee resettlement, CAM beneficiaries must complete all of the required security checks and undergo a medical examination before travel to the United States. The IOM arranges travel for the refugee, and the family agrees to repay the cost of travel.

If denied refugee status, the individual can challenge that determination through a “Request for Review.” Those who are denied refugee status are considered for parole status on a case-by-case basis. They must be found to be at risk of harm or to have a humanitarian need, to clear all background checks, and to have a sponsor. Individuals conditionally approved for parole must complete security checks and medical examinations like CAM refugees. Unlike CAM refugees, individuals conditionally approved for parole must pay for the medical exam and travel to the United States. U.S. Customs and Border Protection (CBP) makes the ultimate decision to grant parole at a port of entry. CAM parole is generally issued for a three-year period with the possibility to renew it.

=== CAM Refugee versus CAM Parole Status ===
Refugee status is indefinite, while parole status is finite. After one year, CAM refugees must adjust their status to Lawful Permanent Residence and may apply thereafter for U.S. citizenship. Refugees are automatically authorized to work. U.S. resettlement agencies (RAs) assist refugees with resettlement. CAM parolees generally do not receive assistance from RAs.

Generally, parole status allows those who are otherwise inadmissible to the United States to temporarily come to the U.S. for urgent humanitarian reasons or significant public benefit. Parole does not lead to a permanent immigration status, but it allows lawful entry to the United States and temporary lawful status, as well as the ability to apply for work authorization. CBP previously issued CAM parole for a two-year period with the possibility to renew it. More recently, CBP issues CAM parole for a three-year period with the possibility to renew it. Parolees are eligible to apply for work authorization during their parole period. There is no pathway to permanent status in the United States through parole as parole does not confer an immigration status. Instead, parolees would have to apply for another form of immigration relief to obtain a permanent status.
