= Kino Border Initiative =

Catholic immigration aid organization

Coordinates: 31°19′57.74″N 110°56′32.32″W

- Established: 2008; 18 years ago
- Purpose: Refugee service
- Headquarters: Nogales, Arizona
- Region served: Mexico & Central America
- Members: Open to all
- Official language: Spanish/English
- Executive Director: Sean Carroll
- Affiliations: Jesuit & Catholic
- Budget: $700,000 per year
- Staff: 15
- Website: www.kinoborderinitiative.org
- Remarks: 6 founders +14 partner

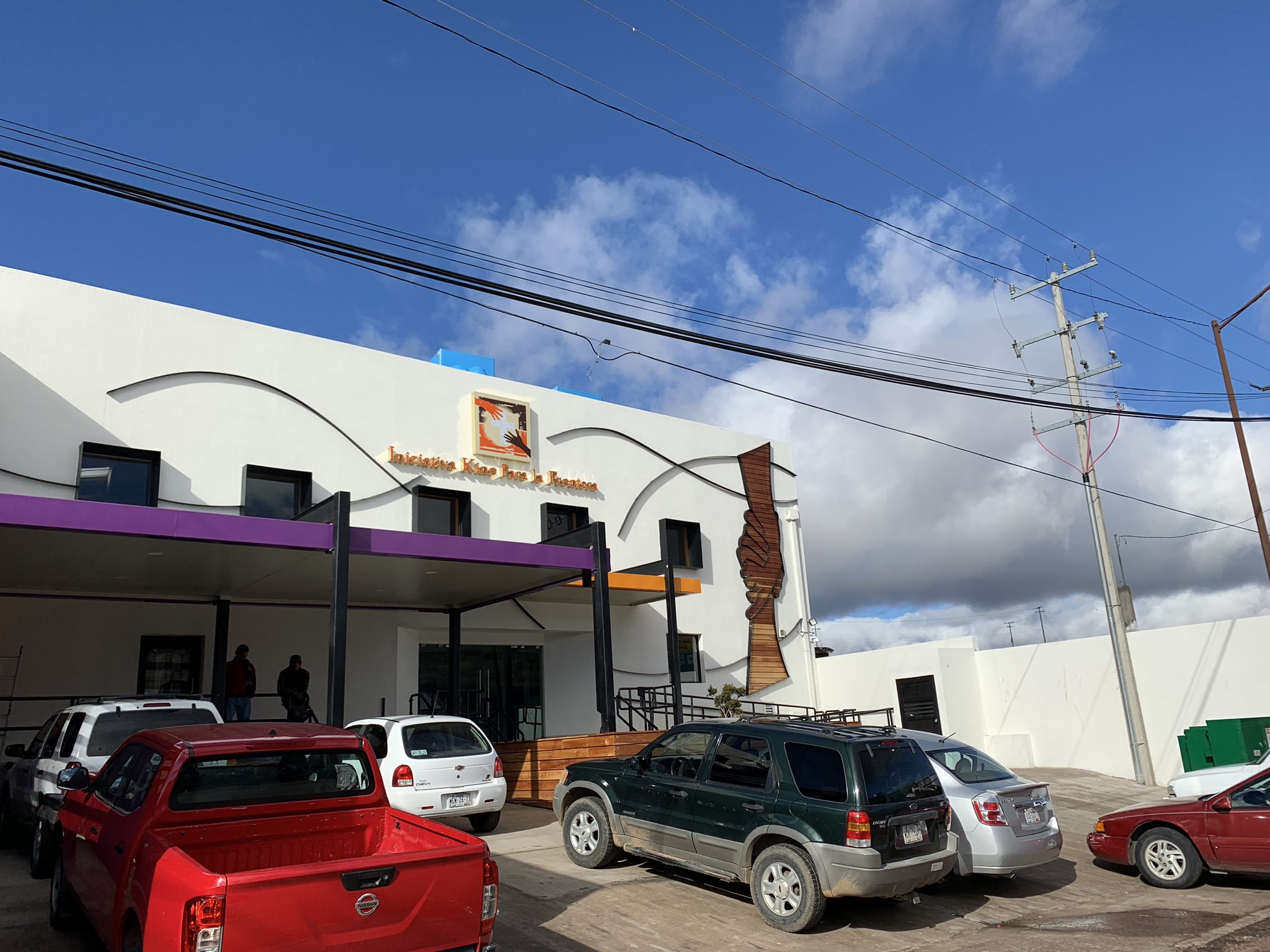
Kino Border Initiative in 2020

Kino Border Initiative (KBI) since 2008 has united six Catholic organizations in an effort to be a humanizing presence and foster bi-national solidarity on the issue of migration on the U.S.–Mexico border through direct assistance and accompaniment, education, research, and advocacy.

== History ==
In 2008 and 2009 in Nogales, Arizona, and Nogales, Sonora, Mexico, this work was begun by six organizations: the California Province of the Society of Jesus, Jesuit Refugee Service/USA, the Missionary Sisters of the Eucharist, the Mexican Province of the Society of Jesus, the Diocese of Tucson, and the Archdiocese of Hermosillo. Its purpose is to break down barriers to humane, just, and workable migration, affirming human dignity and solidarity. KBI gives direct assistance and accompanies migrants, educates communities on both sides of the border, and collaborates with networks of research and advocacy to transform policy at all levels of government. It sees its work in continuity with the historic record of the US in welcoming immigrants, and in support of international standards for the treatment of refugees.
