= Deportation of Indian nationals under Donald Trump =

The Trump administration has been deporting undocumented immigrants of Indian origin since the first presidency of Donald Trump. According to Pew Research Center, undocumented immigrants of Indian origin made up the third-largest demographic in the US after Mexicans and Salvadorans in 2024. In February 2025, the Indian Enforcement Directorate began investigating 4,300 Indians suspected of entering the US illegally between 2021 and 2024.

On 5 February 2025, the US deported 104 Indian nationals on a military plane. This drew criticism from the political opposition in India. The deportation also attracted attention within the United States and elsewhere.

== Background ==
According to the Pew Research Center, there are an estimated 18,000 Indian nationals living in the US illegally, making them one of the largest group after nationals from Mexico and El Salvador.

In 2023, 96,917 Indians were "caught or expelled" at the border, followed by 63,927 in 2022 and 30,662 in 2021. Immigrants from Punjab and Gujarat have used an immigration technique known as "Dunki" to illegally enter the United States. The practice continues despite fears of deportation under the new Trump administration.

A study at the Johns Hopkins University (JHU) found that the number of asylum seekers from India in the U.S. increased from 9,000 in 2018 to 51,000 in 2023, a 466% increase. Since the US immigration system allows foreigners arrested at the border to request asylum, these requests highlight a trend of increasing illegal immigration to the US. The number of Indian nationals arrested for illegal border crossings in the U.S. rose from 1,000 in 2020 to 43,000 in 2023, a rise of 4,200%.

In 2023, the Indian outlet Newslaundry investigated a route from Gujarat to the US. Agents took a fee, roughly ₹4,000,000 to ₹13,000,000 for illegal immigration into the US, and a number of them died whilst attempting this route. The investigation found that some NRIs from Gujarat acted as financiers for illegal immigrants from India to subsequently hire them below the minimum wage. Per the investigation, the illegal immigrants had to work for 3 to 4 years in order to pay their dues. In February 2025, the Enforcement Directorate (ED) announced that it had begun investigating at least 4,300 Indians suspected of having unlawfully entered the US between 2021 and 2024. The number of deportations of Indians from the US increased from 617 in 2023 to 2,025 in 2025.

== First presidency (2017–2021) ==
South Asian Americans Leading Together (SAALT) estimated about 20,000 Indians feared deportation from the US after Donald Trump repealed the Deferred Action for Childhood Arrivals (DACA) programme in 2017.

About 570 Indian nationals were deported to India in 2017, 790 in 2018, and 550 in the first 6 months of 2019. On average, 1,550 Indians were deported annually during Trump's first term in the office.

== Second presidency (2025–present) ==
Following the inauguration of Donald Trump, the Indian government under Narendra Modi announced that they would take back about 18,000 Indian nationals who are living in the US illegally.

On 13 February 2025, Indian PM Narendra Modi stated during a press conference "we have always said that those who are verified and are truly the citizens of India – if they live in the US illegally, India is ready to take them back".

Some Indian students were reported to have been quitting part-time jobs in the US due to fear of deportation. The students reported the increased scrutiny from law enforcement officers visiting their workplaces to check their documents.

In August, the Indian Ministry of External Affairs reported 1,703 Indians were deported from January 2025 - July 2025, averaging eight deportations per day compared to three deportations per day under the Biden administration.

=== Deportation of 104 Indians ===
On 5 February 2025, about 104 Indian nationals were deported to India on a military plane from the US. The flight landed in Amritsar, Punjab, making it the furthest deportation flight on a military plane. The immigrants were handcuffed and their legs were chained.

This deportation was criticised by the opposition of the BJP-led Indian government. Indian MP Shashi Tharoor said, "We are protesting precisely this issue — that the manner in which the U.S. did what they did was really unacceptable." Opposition leader Rahul Gandhi urged PM Narendra Modi to look into this issue, and added that "Indians deserve Dignity and Humanity, NOT Handcuffs." One Indian national described the deportation flight as "torture".

Congress MP Gaurav Gogoi criticised the Indian government for maintaining silence over the incident. External Affairs Minister S Jaishankar downplayed the incident and added that such deportations were not new. A number of Indian citizens questioned why the Modi-led government is silent over the incident contrary to the leaders of Colombia, Mexico, Brazil, and Honduras, who have raised the issue for their citizens.

Political analyst and former Indian government spokesperson Sanjay Baru said, "I’m quite surprised that my government has taken a weak-kneed approach." He added: "For a prime minister who thinks of himself as a tough political leader, he has caved in far too quickly." Author Kingshuk Nag termed the poor treatment of Indian immigrants as having demonstrated an unequal relationship between the two countries.

Over 1,000 Indian nationals were deported on commercial flights in the previous year without any reported controversy.

On 7 February, Foreign Secretary Vikram Misri said India has been notified about "487 presumed Indian nationals" who will be deported soon.

On 13 February, it was reported that two more deportation flights were expected to land in Amritsar, Punjab. Punjab finance minister Harpal Cheema wondered why the flights were landing only in Punjab but not Gujarat.

=== Deportation of 119 Indians ===
On 15 February, there were reports that a deportation flight carrying 119 Indians will be landing in Amritsar, Punjab the same day. Chief Minister Bhagwant Mann accused BJP at the centre of defaming Punjab by making Amritsar as the site for landing deportation flights. The military plane carrying the deportees landed at Amritsar around 11:40 PM. Some of the deportees saw their families at the airport to welcome them. This time, male deportees were handcuffed, and Sikh deportees, in particular, had their turbans removed. This was criticised by the Shiromani Gurdwara Parbandhak Committee.

Deportees by State
State	Number of Deportees
Punjab	67
Haryana	33
Gujarat	8
Uttar Pradesh	3
Goa	2
Maharashtra	2
Rajasthan	2
Himachal Pradesh	1
Jammu & Kashmir	1

Four of the deportees were subsequently arrested by Indian police for charges relating to murder, sexual assault on a minor and alleged snatching and theft.

=== Deportation of 112 Indians ===
An American plane carrying 157 deported Indian nationals was set to arrive on 16 February in Amritsar, Punjab. A US military plane carrying a total of 112 Indians landed at Amritsar on the same day. Subsequently, two flights with 33 of the deportees from Gujarat landed at Ahmedabad.

Deportees by State
State	Number of Deportees
Haryana	44
Gujarat	33
Punjab	31
Uttar Pradesh	2
Himachal Pradesh	1
Uttarakhand	1

=== Deportation of 54 Indians ===
On 26 October, 54 Indians from Harayana state were deported to India from the US. They were handcuffed.

=== Visa restrictions for Indian travel agents ===
In May 2025, in a major crackdown on Indian travel agents to curb illegal migration and human trafficking, the United States Department of State imposed visa restrictions on owners, executives and senior officials of travel agencies based and operating in India for knowingly facilitating illegal immigration to the United States. The move was intended to curb illegal immigration to the United States, an issue that previously brought the Donald Trump administration into focus as it oversaw hundreds of deportations. The immigration policy of the United States also aims to hold the facilitators of illegal immigration accountable.

This visa restriction policy is global and applies to individuals who otherwise qualify for the Visa Waiver Program. These actions are taken pursuant to section 212(a)(3)(C) of the Immigration and Nationality Act.

=== Aftermath ===
The opposition party Indian National Congress cited how the deportation of Nepalese nationals were carried out with chartered flights but the Indians were deported on a military plane while being handcuffed. Indian Youth Congress (IYC) president Uday Bhanu Chib criticised Modi for not raising the issue of inhumane treatment faced by deported Indian nationals. On April 4, Minister of State for External Affairs Kirti Vardhan Singh, said 682 Indians have been deported from the US since January 2025. Singh added most of these individuals illegally entered the US. Indian students reported they were being asked to leave the United States by the officials due to offences such as over-speeding and shoplifting. In 2026, Indian Ministry of External Affairs (MEA) stated that a total of 4,840 Indian nationals were deported by the US between 1 January, 2025 - 31 July, 2026.

== See also ==
- Immigration policy of the second Donald Trump administration
- Deportation and removal from the United States
- Illegal immigration to the United States
- Undocumented immigrant population of the United States
- Indians in the United States
