= Dickerson (surname) =

Dickerson is an English patronymic surname, a variant form of Dickinson, meaning "son of Dick" (a medieval pet form of the given name Richard).

Notable people with the surname include:

- Addie Whiteman Dickerson (1878–1940), American clubwoman and activist
- Alex Dickerson (born 1990), American baseball player
- Allen Dickerson, Member of the United States Federal Election Commission
- Andy Dickerson (born 1982), American football coach
- Andy Dickerson (offensive lineman, born 1963), American football player
- Angie Dickerson, American activist
- Anthony Dickerson (1957–2019), American gridiron football player
- Arque Dickerson (1923–2014), Tuskegee Airman and industrial designer
- Avante Dickerson (born 2003), American football player
- Beach Dickerson (1924–2005), American actor
- Bobby Dickerson (born 1965), American baseball coach
- Brandon Dickerson, American writer, director, and producer
- Bubba Dickerson (born 1981), American professional golfer
- Buttercup Dickerson (1858–1920), American baseball player
- Caitlin Dickerson, American journalist
- Carrie Barefoot Dickerson (1917–2006), American activist
- Carroll Dickerson (1895–1957), American jazz violinist and bandleader
- Chris Dickerson (baseball) (born 1982), American baseball player
- Chris Dickerson (bodybuilder) (1939–2021), American former professional bodybuilder
- Chuck Dickerson (1937–2024), American and Canadian football coach
- Cole Dickerson (born 1991), American basketball player
- Corey Dickerson (born 1989), American baseball player
- Dakota Dickerson (born 1996), American racing driver
- Dan Dickerson (born 1958), American sportscaster
- Dave Dickerson (born 1967), American basketball coach
- David Ellis Dickerson, American author and radio personality
- Debra Dickerson (born 1959), American writer
- Deke Dickerson (born 1968), American singer, guitarist, composer, and writer
- Denver Dickerson (1914–1981), American politician
- Denver S. Dickerson (1872–1925), American politician
- Dez Dickerson (born 1955), American guitarist and singer
- Dorin Dickerson (born 1988), American football player
- Dudley Dickerson (1906–1968), American actor
- Earl B. Dickerson (1891–1986), American politician
- Eric Dickerson (born 1960), American football player
- Ernest Dickerson (born 1951), American film director
- Fanny Dickerson Bergen (1846–1924), an American folklorist, ethnobiologist and author
- Fred I. Dickerson (1911–1917), American football coach
- Garrett Dickerson (born 1995), American football player
- Gary E. Dickerson (born 1956), American businessperson
- George Dickerson (1933–2015), American actor
- George Dickerson (baseball) (1892–1938), American baseball player
- George W. Dickerson (1913–2002), American football player and coach
- Glenda Dickerson (1945–2012), American theatre director
- Greg Dickerson, American sportscaster
- Henry Dickerson (1951–2023), American basketball coach
- Ian Dickerson (born 1969), British writer, director and producer
- Jason Dickerson, American politician
- Joe Dickerson (born 1987), American soccer referee
- John Dickerson (born 1968), American journalist
- John Dickerson (trainer) (1863–1944), American horse trainer
- John J. Dickerson (1900–1966), American politician
- John S. Dickerson (born 1982), American journalist
- Jonathan G. Dickerson (1811–1878), American judge
- Jordan Dickerson (born 1993), American professional basketball player
- Joseph Dickerson (1864–1954), American politician
- Joyce Dickerson (born 1945), American politician
- Keitha Dickerson (born 1978), American basketball player
- Kellee Hennessy Dickerson (born 1970), American politician
- Korbyn Dickerson (born 2003), American baseball player
- Kori Dickerson (born 1978), American football player
- Landon Dickerson (born 1998), American football player
- Larry Dickerson (1956–2002), American politician
- Mahala Ashley Dickerson (1912–2007), American lawyer and civil rights advocate
- Mahlon Dickerson (1770–1853), American politician
- Marianne Dickerson (1960–2015), American long-distance runner
- Mary Cynthia Dickerson (1866–1923), American herpetologist and magazine editor
- Mary H. Dickerson (1830–1914), African American businesswoman and clubwoman
- Mary Lou Dickerson (born 1946), American politician
- Matt Dickerson (born 1995), American football player
- Matthew T. Dickerson, American computer scientist and Tolkien scholar
- Mechele Dickerson (born 1962), American lawyer
- Merle Dickerson (1911–1984), Canadian politician
- Michael Dickerson (born 1975), American basketball player
- Mikey Dickerson, American computer scientist
- Nancy Dickerson (1927–1997), American TV journalist
- Noah Dickerson (born 1997), American basketball player
- Oliver Morton Dickerson (1875–1966), American historian, author, and educator
- Pam Dickerson (born 1953), American politician
- Philemon Dickerson (1788–1862), American judge
- R.Q. Dickerson (1899–1951), American jazz musician
- Rainbow Dickerson, American actress
- Rich Dickerson, American radio host
- Richard Dickerson (1937–2014), American politician
- Richard E. Dickerson (1931–2025), American biochemist
- Robert Dickerson (1924–2015), Australian artist
- Roger Donald Dickerson (born 1934), New Orleans pianist and composer
- Ron Dickerson Jr. (born 1971), American football player and coach
- Ron Dickerson (born 1948), American football player and coach
- Russell Dickerson (born 1987), American singer-songwriter
- Steven Dickerson, American politician
- Thom Dickerson (1949–2014), American journalist
- Thomas Dickerson (1889–1970), South African cricketer
- Tommy Dickerson (born 1945), American politician
- Travis Dickerson (born 2000), American musician and producer
- Tyler Dickerson (born 1993), American singer-songwriter
- Walt Dickerson (1931–2008), American jazz vibraphone player
- Warren C. Dickerson (born 1853), American architect
- Wilfred Lee Dickerson (born 1909), American politician
- William Dickerson (director), American filmmaker
- William K. Dickerson (1872–1948), American harness racing driver
- William W. Dickerson (1851–1923), American politician

== See also ==
- Dickerson (disambiguation)
