= Mechele =

Mechele is a surname and given name. Notable people with the name include:

- Brandon Mechele (born 1993), Belgian footballer
- Mechele Dickerson (born 1962), American lawyer and professor
