= Dickerson =

Dickerson may refer to:

== Places ==
In the United States:

- Dickerson, Maryland, an unincorporated place
  - Dickerson Whitewater Course near Dickerson, Maryland
  - Dickerson Generating Station
  - Dickerson (MARC station)
- Dickerson Middle School, a middle school in Georgia
- Dickerson Chapel, a church in North Carolina

== Other uses ==
- Dickerson (surname)
- Dickerson v. United States, a major U.S. Supreme Court case reaffirming the requirement of a Miranda warning
