= Wilfred Lee Dickerson =

American politician

Wilfred Lee Dickerson (September 18, 1909-?) was a politician in West Virginia. He lived in Bartley, West Virginia. He was a Democrat.

Dickerson was born in Laurel Creek, West Virginia. He represented McDowell County, West Virginia in the West Virginia House of Delegates in 1967 and 1968. He belonged to the United Mine Workers.

A Bishop, he served on a citizens advisory commission to the legislature in 1967.
