= Trump administration family separation policy =

2017–2018 U.S. border policy

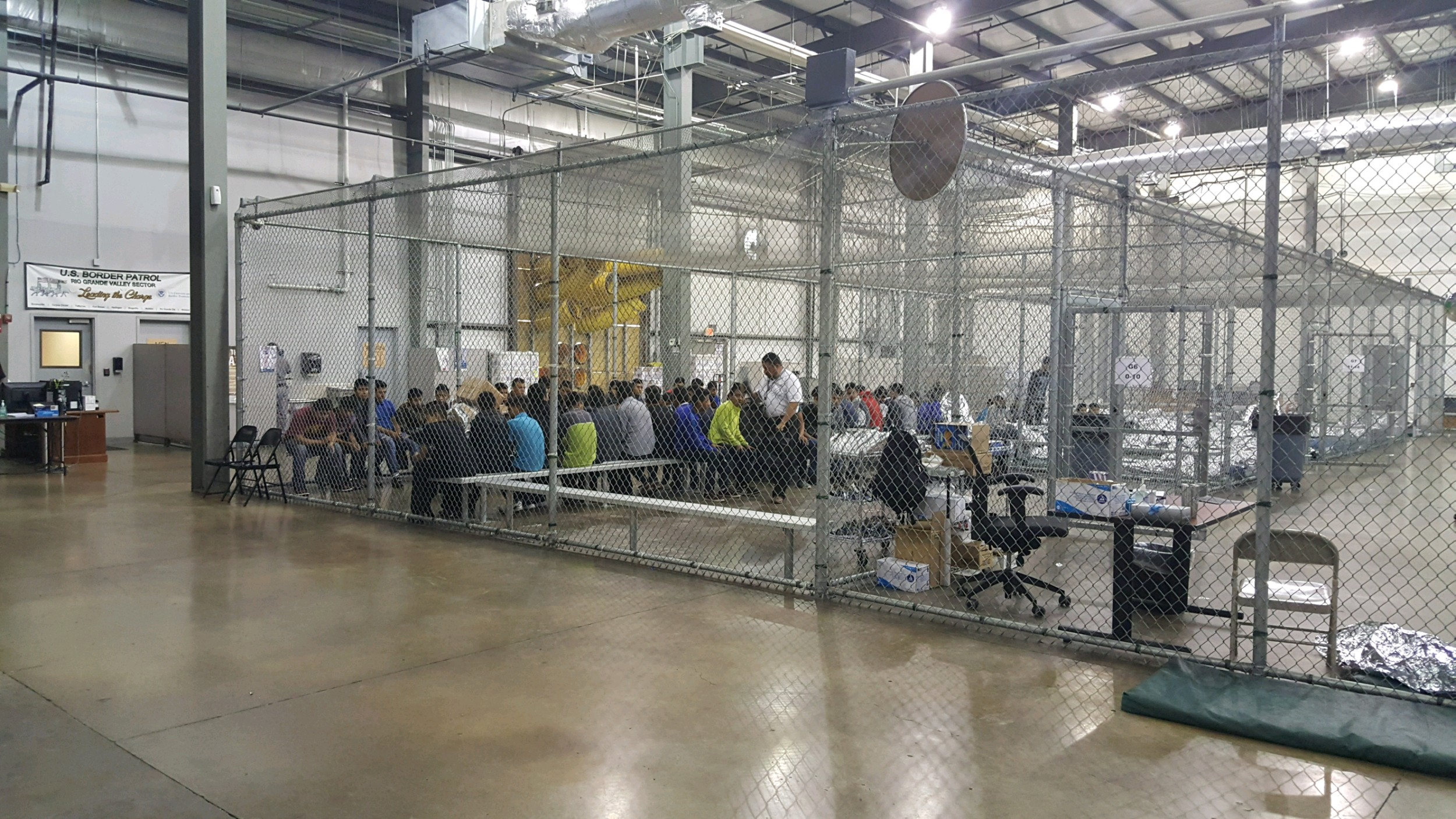
Ursula detention facility in McAllen, Texas, dated June 2018

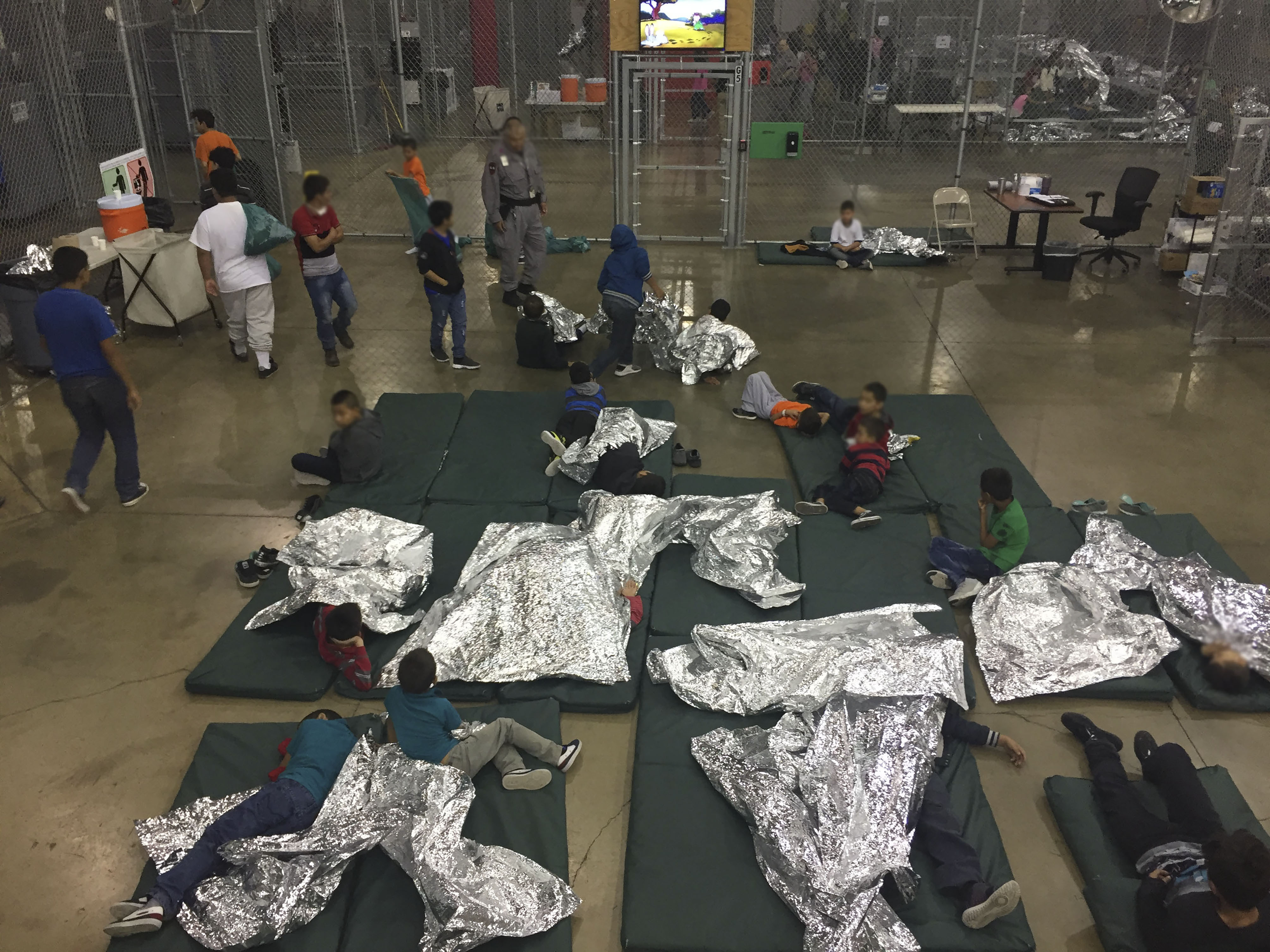
Children shown in sleeping mats and thermal blankets on floor

The family separation policy under the first Trump administration was a controversial immigration enforcement strategy implemented in the United States from 2017 to 2018, aimed at deterring illegal immigration by separating migrant children from their parents or guardians. The policy was presented to the public as a "zero tolerance" approach, intended to encourage tougher legislation and discourage unauthorized crossings. In some cases, families following the legal procedure to apply for asylum at official border crossings were also separated. Under the policy, federal authorities separated children and infants from parents or guardians with whom they had entered the U.S. The adults were prosecuted and held in federal jails or deported, and the children were placed under the supervision of the U.S. Department of Health and Human Services (HHS). Prior to their transfer to HHS, some children spent three weeks or more in overcrowded border control centers, where they reported minimal food, no access to clean clothes or bathing facilities, and no adult caretakers; girls as young as ten were taking care of younger children.

Family separations began in the summer of 2017, prior to the public announcement of the "zero tolerance" policy in April 2018. The policy was officially adopted across the entire U.S.–Mexico border from April 2018 until June 2018. The practice of family separation continued for at least eighteen months after the policy's official end, with an estimated 1,100 families separated between June 2018 and the end of 2019. In total, more than 5,500 children, including infants, were separated from their families.

By early June 2018, it emerged that the policy did not include measures to reunite the families that it had separated. Scott Lloyd, director of the Office of Refugee Resettlement, had directed his staff not to maintain a list of children who had been separated from their parents. Matthew Albence, head of enforcement and removal operations for Immigration and Customs Enforcement, had told his colleagues to prevent reunification even after the parents had been processed by the judicial system, saying that reunification "undermines the entire effort". Following national and international criticism, on June 20, 2018, Trump signed an executive order ending family separations at the border. On June 26, 2018, U.S. district judge Dana Sabraw issued a nationwide preliminary injunction against the family separation policy and ordered that all children be reunited with their parents within thirty days. In 2019, a release of emails obtained by NBC News revealed that although the administration had said that they would use the government's "central database" to reconnect the thousands of families that had been separated, the government had only enough information to reconnect sixty children with their parents. The administration refused to provide funds to cover the expenses of reuniting families, and volunteer organizations provided both volunteers and funding. Lawyers working to reunite families stated that 666 children still had not been found as of November 2020, and by March 2024 the American Civil Liberties Union increased the estimate to 2,000.

== History ==
=== Previous U.S. policy ===
Prior to the Trump administration, the United States did not routinely separate migrant parents from their children. Rather, previous administrations used either family detention facilities (allowing families to remain intact pending deportation hearings in civil immigration court) or alternatives to detention (e.g., release pending further hearings). Families traveling together were generally only separated under narrow circumstances, such as suspicion of human trafficking, an outstanding warrant, or fraud. For decades, the government did not pursue criminal charges for illegal entry, which had been a misdemeanor offense since 1929. The Immigration and Nationality Act of 1965 led to a significant change in U.S. immigration, with increased immigration from regions including Mexico and Central America, including an increase in child immigrants. Starting in the 1980s, increasing numbers of unaccompanied minors migrated to the United States from Central America.

==== Flores Settlement Agreement ====
In 1984, the director of Western Region of the INS introduced a new policy that a detained immigrant unaccompanied minor "could only be released to a parent or legal guardian". This resulted in minors allegedly being detained in poor conditions for "lengthy or indefinite" periods of time.Starting in 1985, in response to these allegations of mistreatment of unaccompanied minors in INS facilities, a series of lawsuits was initiated. In 1997, following years of litigation over these lawsuits which included Flores v. Meese and Reno v. Flores, a consent decree or settlement called the Flores Settlement Agreement was reached. It set strict standards regarding the treatment of minors by the Immigration and Naturalization Service. The government agreed to keep children in the least restrictive setting possible and to ensure their prompt release from detention. The settlement required minors to be provided with "food and drinking water as appropriate", "medical assistance if minor is in need of emergency services", "toilets and sinks", "adequate temperature control and ventilation", "adequate supervision to protect minors from others", "contact with family members who were arrested with the minor and separation from unrelated adults whenever possible".

==== Bush Administration ====
In 2005, President George W. Bush launched Operation Streamline, a "zero-tolerance" program targeting a stretch of the U.S.–Mexico border that referred unlawful entrants for criminal prosecution and expedited their deportation. Operation Streamline was later renamed the Criminal Consequence Initiative. Parents traveling with minor children were typically exempt from the policy. In 2006, Congress designated a single facility—the T. Don Hutto Residential Center—to house families together, and that facility opened in 2006. Children were nonetheless sometimes separated from their parents as a result of child welfare practices and immigration policies; a 2011 report estimated that 5,100 children were in foster care while their parents were detained or deported.

==== Obama Administration ====
The Obama administration initially rejected family detention and shuttered the Hutto Center. But, after the 2014 American immigration crisis, which was a surge in women and unaccompanied children seeking entrance to the U.S., Obama assembled a multiagency team tasked with crafting new immigration policies. This occasioned the first discussion of a family-separation policy, which was proposed by ICE official Thomas Homan, though the proposal was quickly rejected. Instead, the administration opted to expand the detention policy and built new family-detention facilities, meant to hold families indefinitely pending deportation. The journalist Caitlin Dickerson described Homan as the "intellectual father" of family separation policy.

===== Flores v. Lynch =====
In 2016, the Ninth Circuit Court of Appeals ruled in Flores v. Lynch that, pursuant to the Flores Settlement Agreement, both unaccompanied and accompanied minors could only be held in detention for a short time—roughly, 20 days. The Obama administration complied with the order, and, facing intense criticism, it also reversed course on family detention, adopting new rules that took into account the interests of parents and re-focusing the detention policy on immigrants who had previously committed crimes in the United States. Few families were ever separated under the Obama administration, and such families were generally quickly reunited once identified. Unaccompanied children were kept in holding cells, separated by age and gender, while appropriate placements were found. Supporters of Donald Trump would later claim that his family separation policy was equivalent to policies under the Obama administration, but non-partisan groups and journalists have described the assertion as false.

=== Trump administration ===
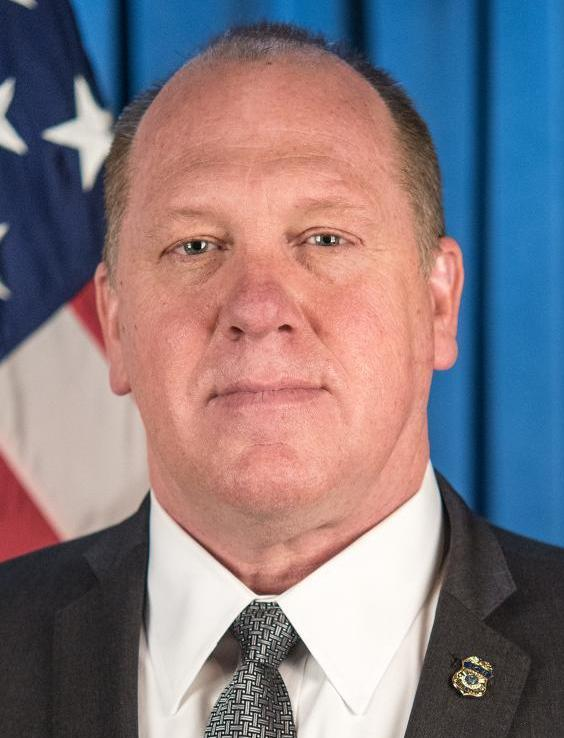
Thomas Homan

While running for president in 2016, candidate Donald Trump said ending "catch and release" was the second of his two priorities for immigration reform, after walling off Mexico. After taking office in January 2017, Trump demoted Daniel Ragsdale as director of ICE and replaced him with Thomas Homan, who had long advocated for the separation of children from their families as a means of deterring illegal immigration. While Homan's ideas had previously been dismissed, they were well received within the Trump administration. The journalist Caitlin Dickerson described Homan as the "intellectual father" of child separation, based on her Pulitzer-prize winning investigation into the policy. Trump's senior adviser Stephen Miller was also a driving force behind the Trump administration's family separation policy. NBC News reported that officials in attendance of a meeting of senior advisers said that "Miller warned that not enforcing the administration's zero tolerance immigration policy 'is the end of our country as we know it' and that opposing it would be un-American."

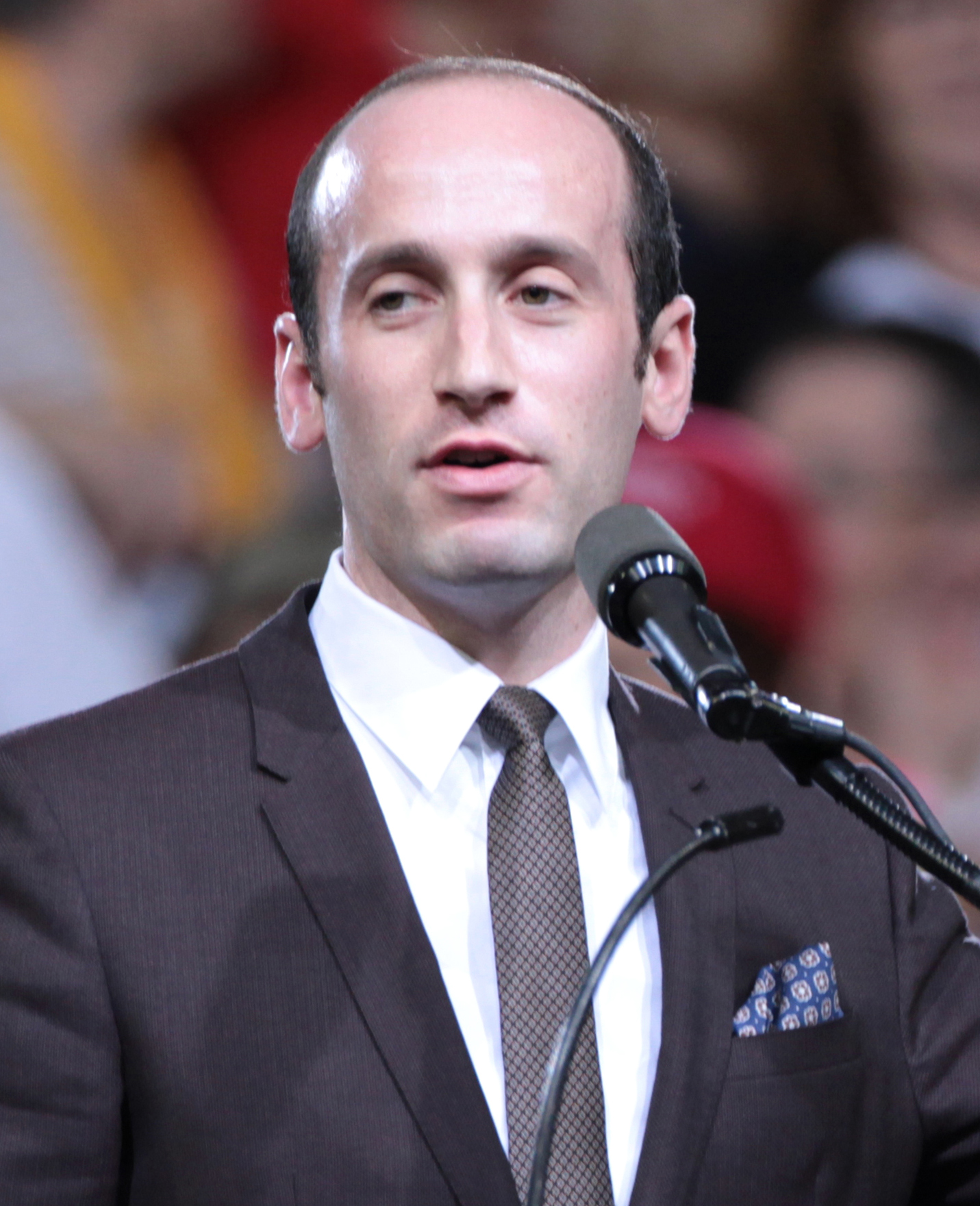
Trump Senior Advisor Stephen Miller

==== Initial proposals (Feb-April 2017) ====
Two weeks after Trump was inaugurated as president on January 20, 2017, the administration reviewed the idea of separating immigrant children from their mothers as a way to deter asylum-seekers. In March 2017, it was first reported that the Department of Homeland Security (DHS) was considering a proposal to separate parents from their children if they were caught attempting to cross the border into the United States.

John Kelly, then Secretary of Homeland Security, confirmed that the policy was under consideration, but later denied it. Speaking on Democracy Now! the director of the National Immigration Law Center said that the policy, if implemented, would amount "to state-sanctioned violence against children, against families that are coming to the United States to seek safety" and that the administration did not act with transparency in explaining what was being proposed.

On April 5, 2017, the DHS said they were no longer considering the policy partly due to the steep decline in mothers attempting to travel to the U.S. with their children.

==== DOJ escalation of prosecutions (April 2017) ====
In April 2017, Attorney General Jeff Sessions ordered Department of Justice attorneys to escalate federal prosecutions for immigration offenses. Parents were being charged with misdemeanors and jailed while their children were classed as unaccompanied and placed under DHS care. Within five months, hundreds of children were reported to have been separated from their parents.

==== DHS "pilot programs" in Yuma and El Paso (2017) ====
Beginning in May 2017, a program called the Criminal Consequence Initiative was implemented in the Yuma, Arizona Border Patrol Sector. Under that program, first-time border crossers were prosecuted and U.S. Border Patrol agents started separating migrant parents from their children, including children as young as ten months old.

From May to December 31, 2017, more than 234 families were separated in the Yuma sector. These family separations were not publicly reported at the time. Some families separated by U.S. authorities in the Yuma sector remained apart from their children in 2021, four years later, and some separated family members were deported solo and could not be found.

A separate family-separation program was run in the El Paso Border Patrol Sector. Called a "pilot program" for zero tolerance, it ran from May to October 2017. Families were separated, including families that were seeking asylum, and children were then reclassified as "unaccompanied" and sent into a network of shelters with no system created to reunite them with their parents.

In late April 2018, the media reported that a review of government data found that about 700 migrant children, more than 100 of them under the age of 4, had been taken from their parents since October 2017. At that time Department of Homeland Security officials said they split families, not to deter immigration, but rather to "protect the best interests of minor children crossing our borders".

According to an April 2018 memo obtained by The Washington Post, the government viewed the El Paso experiment as successful because during the program, there was a 64 percent drop in apprehensions while apprehensions began to rise in October when it was paused. According to a Border Patrol report, of the 1,800 family members processed during the El Paso sector initiative, approximately 281 individuals were separated from their families. This "experiment" was eventually used by ICE, CBP, and CIS to launch the zero-tolerance program across the entire Southwest border in April.

In May 2018, NPR spoke with a director at The Young Center for Immigrant Children's Rights, an agency that advocates for the children's best interests. Asked if staff had noticed an increase in children coming in with parents and then separated from them at the border, the director told NPR, "We noticed as early as late spring of 2017, and through the winter and now the spring of this year, we have seen a significant number of children referred to us for the appointment of a child advocate for kids taken from their parents at the border."

The existence of the "pilot program" in El Paso first became widely known in June 2018, with reporting by NBC News from information provided by DHS. In 2021, the Washington Post reported on newly revealed government data revealing the existence of the Yuma program, demonstrating that the Trump administration started to separate migrant families months earlier than previously known.

==== Family Case Management Program ends (June 2017) ====
Saying it would save $12 million a year, in June 2017 the Trump administration ended the Family Case Management Program, an ICE program which kept asylum-seeking mothers and their children supervised by ICE out of detention.

==== Administration issues "zero-tolerance" policy in April 2018 ====
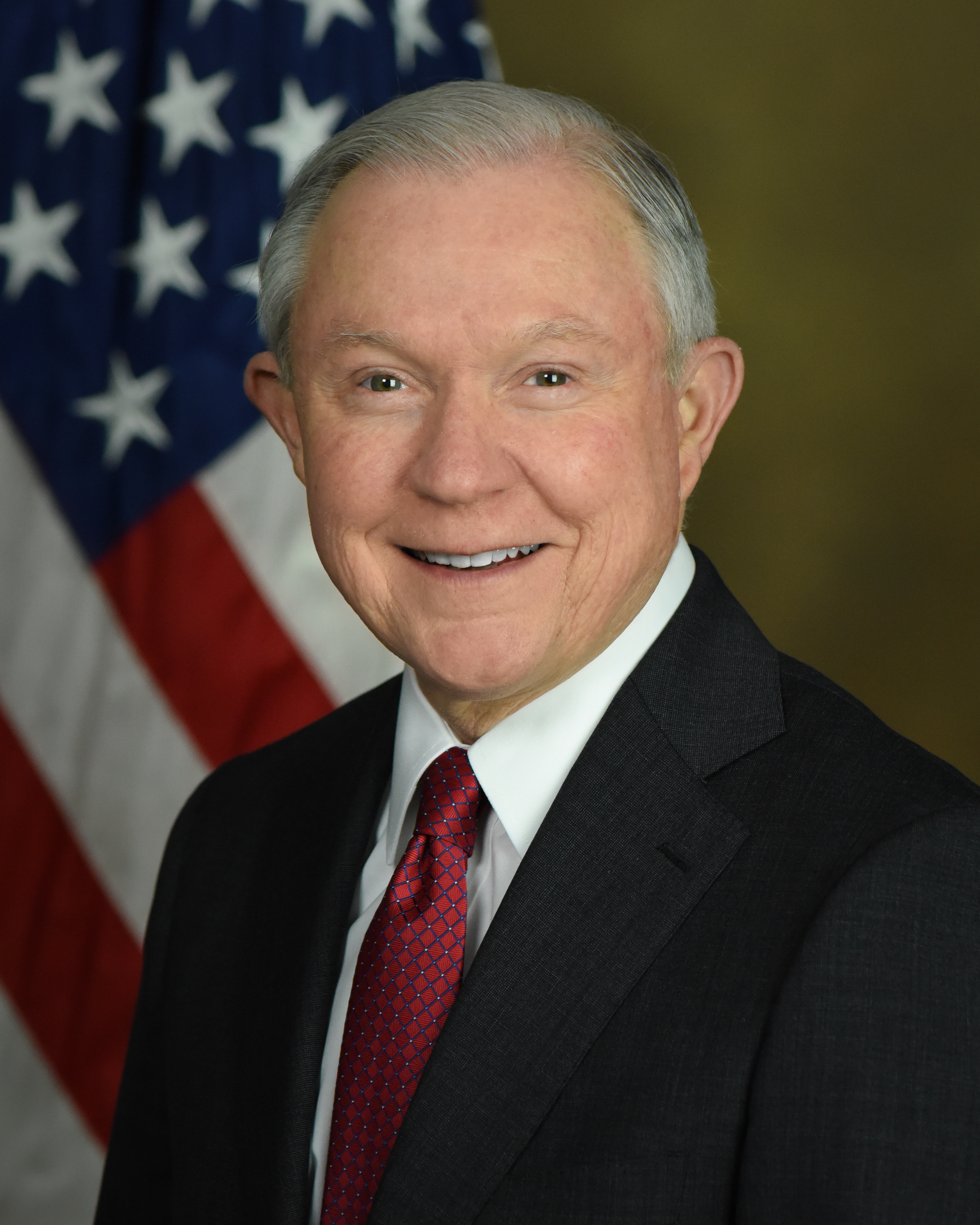
Jeff Sessions

On April 6, 2018, Attorney General Jeff Sessions directed federal prosecutors "to adopt immediately a zero-tolerance policy for all offenses" related to the misdemeanor of improper entry into the United States, and that this "zero-tolerance policy shall supersede any existing policies". This would aim to criminally convict first-time offenders when historically they would face civil and administrative removal, while criminal convictions were usually reserved for those who committed the felony of illegal re-entry after removal. On May 7, 2018, Attorney General Jeff Sessions announced:

If you cross the border unlawfully ... then we will prosecute you. If you smuggle an illegal alien across the border, then we'll prosecute you. ... If you're smuggling a child, then we're going to prosecute you, and that child will be separated from you, probably, as required by law.

Multiple media accounts, as well as direct testimony from detained migrants to members of Congress, reported that immigrant families lawfully presenting themselves at ports of entry seeking asylum were also being separated. Speaking on Face the Nation on June 17, Senator Susan Collins said that the Secretary of Homeland Security Kirstjen Nielsen had testified before the Senate that asylum seekers with families would not be separated if they presented themselves at a legal port of entry, "Yet, there are numerous credible media accounts showing that exactly that is happening, and the administration needs to put an end to that right off." Later in the day Nielsen tweeted: "We do not have a policy of separating families at the border. Period."

The departments of Health and Human Services (HHS) and Homeland Security did not take steps in advance of the April 2018 announcement to plan for family separations or a potential increase in the number of children who would be referred to HHS' Office of Refugee Resettlement (ORR) because they did not have advance notice of the announcement, according to agency officials interviewed by the Government Accountability Office. Though they did not receive advance notice of the April 2018 announcement, ORR officials said they were aware that increased separations of parents and children were occurring prior to the April announcement, saying the percentage of children referred to the agency who were known to have been separated from their parents rose by more than tenfold from November 2016 to August 2017.

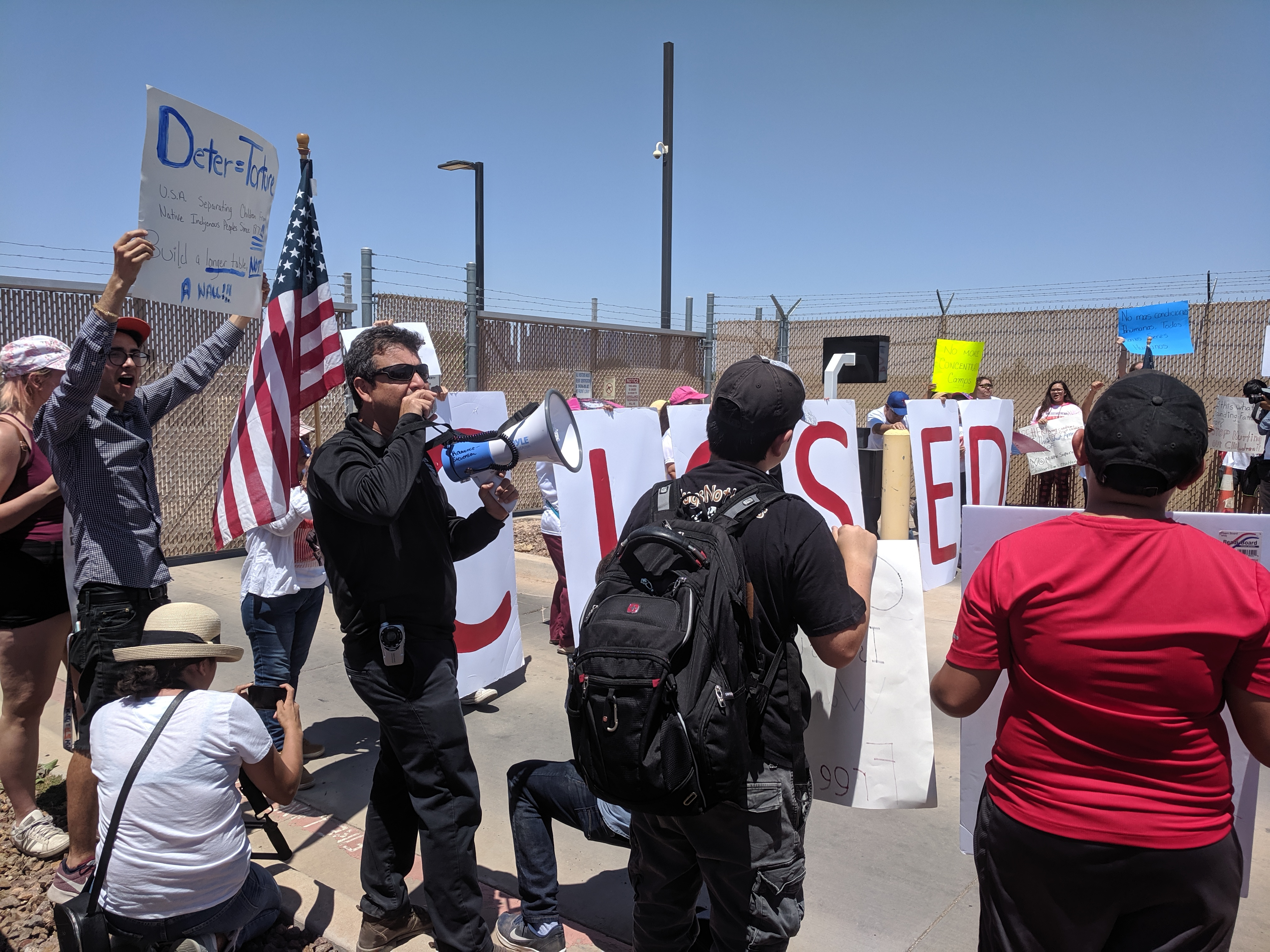
Protest against child detention outside Border Patrol facility in Clint Texas on June 27, 2019

The policy was notably unpopular, more so than any other major bill or executive action at that time. Poll aggregates showed that approximately 25 percent of Americans supported the policy, although a majority of Republicans supported it. Following the May announcement, dozens of protest demonstrations were held, attracting thousands. In Washington, D.C., Democratic members of Congress marched in protest. The Office of the United Nations High Commissioner for Human Rights called for the Trump administration to "immediately halt" its policy of separating children from their parents, and human rights activists criticized that the policy, insofar as it is also applied to asylum seekers, defied Article 31 of the Refugee Convention.

From January 2018 to June 2018, the civil rights office of the Department of Homeland Security received 850 complaints regarding family separations, most of which came from a fellow federal government agency, the ORR. Over 100 complaints predated the "zero tolerance" policy.

==== Executive order to halt separations (June 20, 2018) ====
On June 20, 2018, Trump bowed to intense political pressure and signed an executive order stating that the Administration would attempt to detain families together instead of separating families. The order instructed the Department of Homeland Security to maintain custody of parents and children jointly, "to the extent permitted by law and subject to the availability of appropriations". This was a change from previous policy in which adults were detained by ICE and children were first detained by ICE and then transferred to the Department of Health and Human Services. It also instructed the Justice Department to request to modify the Flores Agreement, which limited the time for holding children and families with children to twenty days, to allow families to be detained indefinitely pending criminal proceedings or immigration proceedings. The executive order further instructed the Department of Defense, upon request, to provide facilities "for the housing and care of alien families" and to construct such facilities if necessary. The Trump administration said they would use a "central database" to reconnect the thousands of families that had been separated. However, emails obtained by NBC News in 2019 showed that there was no central database and the government had only enough information to reconnect sixty children with their parents.

==== End of "zero tolerance" (June 25, 2018) ====
When signing the executive order, Trump had stated that the "zero tolerance" policy remained in effect. However, it became clear that "zero tolerance" could not be sustained while keeping families together within the scope of court rulings. So on June 25, Customs and Border Protection Commissioner Kevin McAleenan announced that the agency would cease referring every person caught crossing the border illegally for prosecution, effectively ending the "zero tolerance" policy. McAleenan announced a temporary suspension of detaining migrant adults who traveled with children. In this context, White House press secretary Sarah Sanders explained that the government was "out of resources" and could not hold all the undocumented families coming across the U.S.–Mexico border.Implementing "zero tolerance" had been a "huge challenge operationally for our agents", McAleenan said: Border Patrol stations were being overwhelmed by the number of children being held in crowded conditions in holding cells while their parents were processed in court and held in immigration detention, and agents were spending more time processing detained immigrants than guarding the border.

==== Continued separations (June 2018–July 2019) ====
Numerous journalists reported that family separations continued after the executive action and court rulings barring the practice. Some of the reports included USA Today in February 2019, The Boston Globe in March 2019, Los Angeles Times in April 2019, CBS News in May 2019, and Houston Chronicle in June 2019.

In March 2019, the government reported to Judge Sabraw that 245 children were removed from their families, in some cases without clear documentation undertaken to track them in order to reunite them with their parents. The House Committee on Oversight and Reform reported in July 2019 that over 700 children had been separated from their parents after the policy's official end. In July, it was reported that as many as five children per day were being separated, and by the end of the year, the total had reached over 1,100.

In April 2019, officials in the Trump administration alleged that since around the end of 2018, Trump had repeatedly attempted to convince Department of Homeland Security Secretary Kirstjen Nielsen to resume and extend family separations regardless of legality and despite public concerns. Nielsen announced that she was leaving her position as department head on April 7, 2019. Two days later, Trump denied reports he planned to renew and expand his family separation policy, asserting "President Obama had child separation. Take a look—the press knows it, you know it, we all know it. I'm the one that stopped it." In contrast to the Trump systematic family separation policy to deter migrants from entering the U.S., the Obama separation policy was used only in instances when the child's safety was in question or the adult had a prior criminal conviction.

According to Forbes magazine, "After family separation ended, Trump wanted to bring it back ...'Throughout the remainder of his presidency, Trump pushed to relaunch family separations,' reported Caitlin Dickerson."

The last reported family separation took place on July 20, 2019.

==== Congressional hearings ====
In January 2019, the congressional Oversight and Investigations Subcommittee announced that they would hold hearings "to assess the Department of Health and Human Services' (HHS) preparation and response to the Family Separation Policy, its chaotic efforts to reunify children with their families, and the long-term effects of separation on the health and wellbeing of these children".

In February 2019, the House held the first of three planned hearings to bring renewed scrutiny to the events and effects surrounding the Trump zero tolerance policy. Secretary Alex Azar refused a request to testify and Secretary Kirstjen Nielsen said she would appear at the second hearing in March. Jonathan White, who oversaw the care of minors for HHS, testified that neither he nor any other career person in the department's Office of Refugee Resettlement (ORR) had been informed of the new Trump policy and if they had they would not have supported it. He warned that "Separating children from their parents poses significant risks of traumatic psychological injury to the child. The consequences of separation for many children will be lifelong."

The second meeting was held on March 6. The committee questioned Nielsen about the treatment of migrants along the border and her claims that the Trump administration never had a family separation policy. Nielsen denied that the administration intended to separate families but was merely enforcing U.S. law: "The point of it was to increase prosecutions for those breaking the law." When questioned about the "cages", as they have been called, used as enclosures at a Border Control facility, Nielsen replied, "Sir, they're not cages."

== Controversial facility conditions ==
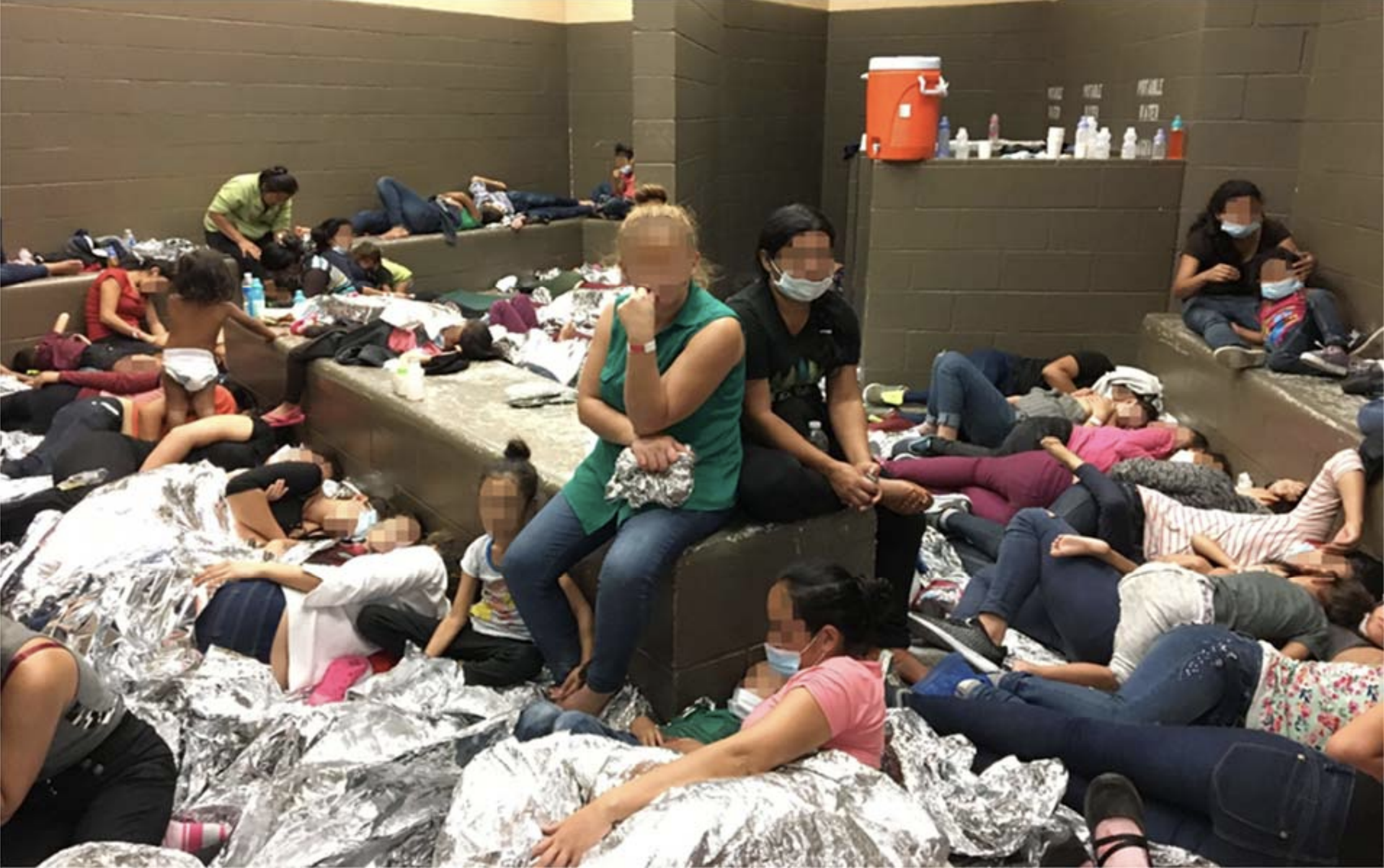
Overcrowded conditions for migrant families detained in Weslaco, Texas were reported by inspectors from the federal government in June 2019.

=== Poor conditions in ICE facilities ===
In June 2019, a group of attorneys who were involved with the Flores settlement visited a Border Patrol center in Clint, Texas. The facility housed 250 children including a 1-year-old, two 2-year-olds, a 3-year-old and "dozens more under 12". The lawyers reported that "kids are taking care of kids, and there's inadequate food, water and sanitation". They reported that the children weren't sleeping in beds but on the concrete floor with only foil blankets. Soap and toothbrushes were not supplied. When questioned, a Department of Justice attorney argued that the children were being properly cared for according to the legal standards, but the standards did not mention that the children needed soap or toothbrushes. The children told the lawyers that meals consisted of instant oatmeal, a cookie and sweetened drink for breakfast, instant noodles for lunch, and a heated frozen burrito and a cookie for dinner. They said they had not had a clean change of clothing or a bath for weeks. There were no adult caretakers; ten and fourteen year old girls were taking care of younger children. A 14-year-old girl from Guatemala who had been holding two little girls in her lap told them, "I need comfort, too. I am bigger than they are, but I am a child, too."

On July 1, 2019, several Democratic members of Congress visited migrant detention centers in Texas in a tour organized by Border Patrol agents. Representative Marc Veasey said Border Patrol "went out of their way to show us facilities that were mostly empty", but the migrant detainees inside "described being deprived of daily showers and certain other rights". Representative Madeleine Dean labelled the situation as "a human rights crisis". They reported fifteen women in their 50s and 60s sleeping in a small concrete cell with no running water and weeks without showers. They had all been separated from their families. Representative Lori Trahan said she saw women "sobbing in a crowded cell because they were separated from their kids". Representatives Alexandria Ocasio-Cortez, Judy Chu and Joaquin Castro alleged that Border Patrol had told detained migrant women to drink out of a toilet for water. Castro also said that he had met between 15 and 20 mothers who had been detained for more than fifty days, some of whom had been separated from their children. Representative Joe Kennedy III said that Border Patrol had been uncooperative, attempting to confiscate the congressmen's phones, and blocking the taking of pictures and videos. Activists who had gathered at the facility chanted support for President Donald Trump and directed racist comments towards Representative Rashida Tlaib, a Muslim.

Between January 2017 and April 2020, 39 adults died in ICE custody or immediately after being released. The ACLU reported, "As part of its recent growth, ICE has awarded contracts at facilities well known for abuse, including former prisons with conditions so terrible that the federal government terminated their contracts in prior administrations." Investigations found that some facilities were understaffed or engaged in cost-cutting measures that could endanger the health of people in detention. Medical facilities appeared dangerously unprepared, with experts raising concerns about medical mismanagement of sick individuals. In interviews, detainees shared concerns about sanitation and their ability to maintain personal hygiene standards, as they were not being provided with soap for bathing or other basic hygiene and cleaning supplies.

Reports detailed gaps in the provision of basic mental health services. Between January 2017 and March 2020, twelve people died as a result of apparent suicide while in detention. The ACLU received reports of people in distress, including survivors of torture and sexual assault who did not receive timely access to support services. Reports detail people with disabilities who failed to receive legally required reasonable assistance for their disabilities and instead faced abuse by detention officials. It was also reported that "officers have used physical force, tear gas and pepper spray, and they have threatened immigrants in detention facilities".

Multiple reports detail systematic health endangerment and neglect of detainees. Medical neglect, refusal to test immigrants for COVID-19, reported discard of medical requests submitted by detained immigrants, and fabricating medical records have been reported. Concerns have been raised regarding the rate in which hysterectomies are performed on immigrant women under ICE custody. This complaint also documents actions by ICDC management, such as allowing employees to work while they are symptomatic awaiting COVID-19 test results and hiding information from employees and detained immigrants about who has tested positive for COVID-19. In addition, this complaint documents ICDC's disregard for public health guidelines set by the Centers for Disease Control and Prevention by maintaining unsanitary conditions and punishing immigrants with solitary confinement when they speak out against these injustices.

=== Poor conditions in HHS facilities ===
In 2019, the Department of Health and Human Services (HHS), Office of the Inspector General (OIG) issued two reports which addressed the effects of separation and detainment on the mental health of migrant children and the deficiencies they found in children's holding centers including the under-staffing of mental health workers. The investigations were done in August and September 2018. Speaking with facility mental health clinicians and program directors, they reported that separated children exhibited "fear, feelings of abandonment, and post-traumatic stress" with some children exhibiting acute symptoms of grief such as crying inconsolably. While healthcare professionals have repeatedly spoken out about the trauma that is being inflicted on migrant children, this is the first time that Trump administration officials have acknowledged the harm that is being done.

After reviewing the report, the organization Physicians for Human Rights commented that the government must end family separations, reunite those who have been separated, and provide reparations for the harm that separation has caused. They advised:

No child belongs in immigration detention, even if they are detained alongside their parents. This administration should immediately adopt community-based alternatives to detention, which are humane and effective, and which lessen trauma experienced by children and families.

The report noted that the large influx of younger children and extended time they were spending in detention resulted in overcrowding and staff shortages. The investigation found that over half of the facilities that they visited had hired case managers who did not meet minimum education standards, and newly hired employees were allowed to work before their criminal and child welfare background checks had been completed. Six facilities received waivers allowing them to skip state child welfare checks altogether.

Democratic Representative Rosa DeLauro, who chairs the House subcommittee that oversees HHS appropriations, said in a statement that the two reports were proof that Trump's family separation policy "was state-sanctioned child abuse". She commented:

The OIG found that separating kids from their families inflicted unspeakable trauma on them. They also noted that this trauma was extended as kids languished in warehouse-like facilities for months on end due to additional Trump administration policies, such as fingerprinting everyone in a sponsor's household. Meanwhile, some facilities were allowed to waive background checks and fingerprinting requirements for the workers that were tasked with caring for these children. That is unacceptable.

The fingerprinting requirement was dropped in March when children were being held for as long as 93 days because sponsors feared arrest. After the fingerprint requirement was dropped, the length of stay was substantially less.

The question of whether children were being given psychotropic medications was also addressed. The report showed that around 300 children were prescribed antidepressants in May–July 2018. The report noted that staff "described some concerns that dosages or types of medication may not have been right".

In December 2019, documents which were obtained during a lawsuit revealed that the Office of Refugee Resettlement, U.S. Department of Homeland Security, and U.S. Department of Health and Human Services knew that the resettlement camps which housed many separated immigrant families were in poor condition and created health problems for some as well. The Inspector General also concluded that U.S. Customs and Border Protection officers did not accurately record possible family relationships between adults and 1,233 children detained between October 2017 and mid-February 2019.

DOJ-OIG Report (2021/01/14)

== Motivation ==
In February 2017, Immigration and Customs Enforcement (ICE) asylum chief John Lafferty told DHS employees that the Trump administration was "in the process of reviewing" several policies aimed at lowering the number of asylum seekers to the United States, which included the idea of separating migrant mothers and children.

Speaking on NPR in May 2018, White House Chief of Staff John F. Kelly described the policy as "a tough deterrent [and] a much faster turnaround on asylum seekers". When questioned if it might be considered "cruel and heartless" to remove children from their mothers, Kelly replied, "I wouldn't put it quite that way. The children will be taken care of—put into foster care or whatever."

In June 2018, Attorney General Sessions said, "If people don't want to be separated from their children, they should not bring them with them. We've got to get this message out. You're not given immunity." White House senior policy adviser Stephen Miller said: "It was a simple decision by the administration to have a zero tolerance policy for illegal entry, period. The message is that no one is exempt from immigration law."

The Washington Post quoted a White House official as saying that Trump's decision was intended to "force people to the table" to negotiate on laws in Congress. Meanwhile, Trump tweeted: "Any Immigration Bill MUST HAVE full funding for the Wall, end Catch & Release, Visa Lottery and Chain, and go to Merit Based Immigration." [sic]

== Process ==
The Department of Homeland Security (DHS) detains families suspected of illegally crossing the border. Prior to 2018, most suspected illegal border-crossers were dealt with through civil proceedings in immigration courts, where deportation proceedings and asylum hearings take place; most who were criminally prosecuted in federal court "either had been apprehended at least twice before, or had committed a serious crime". Under the Trump administration's "zero-tolerance" policy, the Department of Justice began to criminally prosecute all suspected illegal border-crossers for illegal entry, even those who crossed for the first time. Families undergo separations when parents or adult relatives were charged with unlawful entry.

Parents are held in Federal jails prior to trial. The government conducts expedited, mass trials of alleged border crossers under Operation Streamline. According to The New York Times, "Lawyers receive the roster of clients assigned to them on the morning of the hearing and meet with each one for about twenty minutes to explain the charges and the process in Spanish." People who plead guilty are typically sentenced to time served in jail, while repeat offenders may be sentenced to 30–75 days in jail. Once convicted, they are eligible for deportation. Due to the Trump executive order, DHS no longer prioritized deporting those convicted of more dangerous crimes. They are then transferred to Immigration and Customs Enforcement custody.

According to several defense lawyers working with the immigrants, in many cases the Border Patrol agents lie to the parents in order to get them to let go of their kids, telling them that the children are being taken for questioning or "to be given a bath". In other cases the children may be removed to another location while the parent is in jail being processed, which generally takes a few hours. Children are held temporarily by the DHS before being transferred to the Department of Health and Human Services' Office of Refugee Resettlement (ORR). ORR contracts the operation of around 100 facilities for child migrants to companies and nonprofit organizations. The Flores settlement requires that ORR hold children no longer than twenty days before releasing them.

Children are being transferred into foster care placements across the country. The fifty children placed in western Michigan include infants of 8 and 11 months, and have an average age of 8. Children are flown to Michigan during the overnight hours, and foster care officials report they have not been told where they are going. Officials also report that children have been waiting as long as thirty days to speak to their parents, due to difficulties locating them. According to the legal support organization KIND, in at least six cases including that of a two-year-old girl, parents being deported have not been reunited with their children, who remain in the United States.

According to a June 2018 analysis by USA Today, in most cases migrants are bused from the immigration holding facility to federal court where they plead guilty to having entered the country illegally, a misdemeanor, and are sentenced to whatever time they have already spent in the government's custody and a $10 (~$13.00 in 2025) fine. They are then bused back to the holding facility to be processed for deportation. If they have children, upon their return they may find that their children are gone.

According to a report of June 27 by Texas Tribune, immigrant children as young as three years old have been ordered into court for their own deportation proceedings. Children in immigration court are not entitled to free, court-appointed attorneys to represent them. Instead, they are given a list of legal services organizations that might help them.

=== 2021 DOJ Office of the Inspector General report ===
In January 2021, the Inspector General for the Department of Justice concluded an investigation into the "zero tolerance" policy, finding that: department leaders underestimated the difficulty of implementing it, failed to tell local prosecutors and others that children would be separated; failed to understand that separations would last longer than a few hours; and failed to halt the policy after that was discovered. The findings led Rod Rosenstein, who had been Trump's Attorney General at the time the policy was enforced, to admit that family separations "should never have been implemented". According to an NBC News report on the investigation, "The report could provide a road map for the incoming Biden administration to investigate those responsible for a policy President-elect Joe Biden has called criminal."

== Impact ==
In the past, most migrants illegally crossing the border came almost entirely from Mexico; however, the current influx now includes greater numbers of women and children fleeing violence, gang recruitment, and sexual trafficking in the Northern Triangle of Central America countries of El Salvador, Guatemala, and Honduras. Rather than illegally crossing into the U.S., they are presenting themselves at the border hoping to claim asylum, which they were legally entitled to do under certain circumstances. The Trump administration claimed the family separation policy was directed at those migrants who illegally crossed the U.S. border but they then decided to charge everyone crossing the border with illegal entry. They also charged asylum seekers in criminal court rather than waiting to see if they qualified for asylum.

In May 2018, a Honduran man, Marco Antonio Muñoz, 39, committed suicide after his 3-year-old son was forcibly taken and separated from him by Border Patrol Agents. The man had crossed the Rio Grande with his son and his wife and turned himself and his family in to authorities to ask for asylum.

In June 2018, U.S. Representative Pramila Jayapal spoke with recently arrived detainees at the Federal Detention Center, SeaTac facility located near Seattle. The facility housed 206 immigrants, 174 of them were women. Many of the women spoke of "fleeing threats of rape, gang violence and political persecution". She said more than half of the women were mothers who had forcibly been separated from their children, some as young as twelve months old, and said that many did not know where their children were being detained. Commenting on her visit of the facility, Jayapal called the women's stories "heartbreaking", saying, "I've been doing immigration-rights work for almost two decades. I am not new to these stories. I will tell you there was not a dry eye in the house. ... Some of them heard their children screaming for them in the next room. Not a single one of them had been allowed to say goodbye or explain to them what was happening." According to Jayapal, some Border Patrol had told the mothers that "their families don't exist anymore."

A journalist working for The New Yorker spoke with several women incarcerated at the Otero County Prison, a privately run facility in New Mexico, and an attorney representing them. One mother said that she had no idea where her child was and was concerned that his medical conditions were not being attended to. Another mother said that of the fifty mothers in her wing at Otero, few knew where their children were. The public defender said the family separation policy was "changing the lawyer-client relationship", saying "clients don't even care about beating the charge they're facing. It makes it harder to represent them, because all they want is to be with their children."

=== Number of children ===
The Department of Homeland Security confirmed on June 15, 2018, that 1,995 immigrant children were separated from their parents (mostly due to not crossing at a legal port of entry) during the six weeks from April 19 and May 31. This figure did not include children of families that asked for asylum at an official border crossing and were then separated. Speaking on Face the Nation on June 17, Senator Susan Collins suggested that the number may well be higher.

Steven Wagner, the Acting Assistant Secretary for the Administration for Children and Families under HHS, was unable to say in June 2018 how many separated children had been placed with sponsors or reunited with their parents, but that the department is "under a legal obligation" to place children quickly with a sponsor, however, "we actually don't have a time limit in terms of days" that the children are allowed to stay in HHS care.

Zero tolerance and the separation of children was suspended for an indefinite period of time on June 20, 2018, through an executive order. On June 26, U.S. District Court Judge Dana Sabraw issued a nationwide preliminary injunction against the family-separation policy and required the government to reunite separated families within thirty days and to reunite children under five with their parents within 14 days. On that date DHS stated that 522 migrant children, all of them in the custody of Customs and Border Protection, had been reunited with their families. After a site visit to DHS facilities, Senator Elizabeth Warren reported that, "Mothers and children may be considered 'together' if they're held in the same gigantic facility, even if they're locked in separate cages with no access to one another." The Secretary of Health and Human Services Alex Azar testified that 2,047 children—out of a total of around 2,300 ever in HHS custody—continued to be held in HHS-contracted facilities.

On July 5, Azar declared that the total number of children that had been separated was under 3,000 and that, of these, the number of children under five years was fewer than 100. On July 6, government lawyers informed Judge Sabraw that HHS would be able to meet the deadline of July 19 for only about half the concerned children. The government had connected 46 of the toddlers with parents still in custody. Concerning the other half, the lawyers stated that the parents of 19 of the children had been released and now had unknown whereabouts, and the parents of further 19 children had been deported. Two children had been connected to parents criminally ineligible to re-take custody of their children. Judge Sabraw said the time limit for reunifying the youngest children could be extended under the condition that the government would provide a master list of all children and the status of their parents. A list of 101 children was to be shared with the ACLU within the following day. A status conference was scheduled for the morning of July 9 concerning which cases would merit a delay. On July 6, a government lawyer provided the status of 102 children under five in custody to Federal Judge Dana Sabraw, and stated that numbers are approximate and "in flux".

In September 2018 it was reported that 12,800 children were being held in federal custody, and that federal shelters housing migrant children were filled to around ninety percent since May 2018.

A report by Amnesty International, published in 2018, found that the statistics on the separated children did not include children who had been separated from non-parental relationships, for example from grandparents, or those who were separated due to their documentation being insufficient. In January 2019, auditors from the Office of the Inspector General at the Department of Health and Human Services stated that the practice of separating migrant children from their families started earlier and involved thousands more children than previously known, and that in the summer of 2017 a "steep increase in the number of children who had been separated from a parent or guardian" occurred.

A followup government report released in January 2019, revealed that while HHS had previously said that the total number of children separated from their parents was 2,737, a new investigation revealed that the actual number of separated children was several thousand higher, with the exact number unknown due to poor record keeping. HHS is not able to identify or count children who were released from the government's custody before officials started identifying separated families. Following a court ruling in 2019, government officials stated that identifying all children would require a joint effort of 12 to 24 months duration led by a team of officials representing HSS, ICE and CBP.

In October 2019 the Trump administration again revised its estimate of the number of children separated from parents, adding 1,556 to the previous number and bringing the total to almost 5,500. Approximately 1,090 of those separations occurred following the court order to end family separations. The ACLU continues to look for more children who were separated prior to the "zero tolerance" announcement. In a statement, ACLU lawyer Lee Gelernt said: "It is shocking that 1,556 more families—including babies and toddlers—join the thousands of others already torn apart by this inhumane and illegal policy. Families have suffered tremendously, and some may never recover. The gravity of this situation cannot be overstated."

In October 2020, The New York Times reported that more than 5,500 children in total had been separated from their parents at the U.S. border under the Trump administration.

=== Impacts of separation on children ===
Children's mental health has had a strong correlation with forced parent–child separation and parental loss which has led to potential traumatic events (PTEs). Research has found that "forced parent–child separation and parental loss are PTEs with adverse effects on child mental health and academic functioning". Reports show that children who have experienced PTEs from parent deportation have been more prone to being diagnosed with PTSD. Research also found that "emerging research has indicated that parental detention and deportation increase risk for mental health problems such as severe psychological distress, anxiety, and depression". Due to these mental stressors, many of these children have reported symptoms of post-traumatic stress disorder from traumatic parent separations. A case study of 91 U.S. born citizens ages 6 to 12, using the UCLA Posttraumatic Stress Disorder Reaction Index and found that "29% of all child participants met criteria for full (19%) or partial (10%) PTSD diagnoses".

A 2018 study looked at the impact of parent-child separation and child detention on the mental health and development of children. The author interviewed parents and children who had experienced separation and reported that the separation of the children from their parents together with a background of chronic and acute adversity has created a "perfect storm for attachment damage, toxic stress and trauma". The author noted that a child under prolonged stress "may develop complex patterns of protective responses that can include hyperarousal—hypervigilance, agitation, flashbacks and emotional reactivity, or hypoarousal—dissociative responses, emotional numbing (self-harm may be used as a tool to 'feel alive'), passive compliance and poor access to cognitive functioning". The study's findings also suggested that enforcement of immigration laws poses "serious health challenges and risks for lifelong mental illness in children".

=== Fiscal costs and diversion of resources ===
The costs of separating migrant children from their parents and keeping them in "tent cities" are higher than keeping them with their parents in detention centers. It costs $775 per person per night to house the children when they are separated but $256 per person per night when they are held in permanent HHS facilities and $298 per person per night to keep the children with their parents in ICE detention centers.

To handle the large amount of immigration charges brought by the Trump administration, federal prosecutors had to divert resources from other criminal cases. The head of the Justice Department's major crimes unit in San Diego diverted staff from drug smuggling cases. Drug smuggling cases were also increasingly pursued in state courts rather than federal courts, as federal prosecutor were increasingly preoccupied with pursuing charges against illegal border crossings. In October 2018, USA Today reported that the number of federal drug-trafficking prosecutions on the Southern border plummeted, as prosecutorial resources were diverted to the family separation policy.

It was reported in June 2018, that the Trump administration planned to pay Texas non-profit Southwest Key more than $458 million in the fiscal year of 2018 to care for immigrant children detained crossing the U.S. border illegally.

In July 2018, it was reported that HHS had spent at least $40 million over two months to care for and reunify migrant children, and that the HHS was preparing to shift more than $200 million from other HHS accounts. Such transfers by federal agencies must be 1% or less of the donor funds and 3% or less of the recipient funding. The requests have to be sent to the relevant congressional subcommittees and approved by the chair. By September 2018, it was reported that the Trump administration planned to shift more than $260 million (~$328 million in 2025) from HHS programs, including some from cancer research and HIV/AIDS prevention, to cover the costs associated with detaining children and delaying releasing them to adults.

=== ProPublica audio tape ===
ProPublica recording of crying children separated from their families

On June 18, 2018, as reporters waited for a briefing by the Secretary of the Department of Homeland Security Kirstjen Nielsen, ProPublica posted a recording of crying children begging for their parents just after being separated from them, which the reporters listened to as they waited for her to speak. Nielsen arrived and spoke, blaming Congress for the administration's policy of separating parents from their children and saying that there would be no change in policy until Congress rewrote the nation's immigration laws. At one point during the briefing, New York magazine reporter Olivia Nuzzi played the tape. Nielsen refused to answer any questions about the material in the tape, such as "How is this not child abuse?"

The tape was made on June 17 when human rights advocates and journalists toured an old warehouse where hundreds of children were being kept in wire cages. The Associated Press reported that the children had no books or toys, overhead lighting was kept on around the clock, and the children were sleeping under foil sheets. There was no adult supervision and the older children were changing the diapers of the toddlers. Michelle Brané, director of migrant rights at the Women's Refugee Commission commented, "If a parent left a child in a cage with no supervision with other 5-year-olds, they'd be held accountable". Most of the tape consists of children crying and wailing for their parents, but a six-year-old girl is heard to repeatedly beg that her aunt be called, who she is certain will come and pick her up. She had memorized her aunt's phone number and ProPublica was able to contact the aunt, but the aunt was unable to assist for fear that her own petition of asylum would be put in jeopardy due to the recent Trump Administration decision to discontinue asylum protections for victims of gang and domestic violence. The aunt said that she was able to keep in touch with her niece by phone and that she had talked to her sister; however, her sister had not yet been allowed to speak with her child. The aunt said that the authorities had told the child that her mother may be deported without her.

Commenting on Trump's executive order and how it was related to the tape of the children crying, Republican commentator Leslie Sanchez commented on Face the Nation, "And a lot of Republicans I talked to, even bundlers, people that put big amounts of money together, said, when they heard the cries of the children, without visual, being separated, that was the moment where America knew this was too far. And that's when the president retreated."

ProPublica followed the child, Alison Jimena Valencia Madrid, and her mother and reported that in August they were reunited. A short video was posted in December 2018 which reports that Alison and her mother are learning English and Alison is going to school. Alison's mother said that gang members in El Salvador had attempted to kidnap her daughter and she had fled to the U.S. to protect her. Their future remains uncertain.

=== Allegations of forced medication and mistreatment ===
There are concerns that the facilities that children were held in may have in the past been associated with the forcible drugging of children. The Texas Tribune reported that detained children who had previously been held at the Shiloh Treatment Center said they had been forcibly treated with antipsychotic drugs by the facility personnel, based on legal filings from a class action lawsuit. According to the filings, the drugs made the children listless, dizzy and incapacitated, and in some cases unable to walk. According to a mother, after receiving the drug, her child repeatedly fell, hitting her head and eventually ending up in a wheel chair. Another child said she tried to open a window, at which point one of the supervisors hurled her against a door, choked her until she fainted and had a doctor forcibly administer an injection while she was being held down by two guards. A forensic psychiatrist consulted by the Tribune compared the practice to what "the old Soviet Union used to do".

The treatment center is one of the companies that have been investigated on charges of mistreating children, although the federal government continues to employ the private agency which runs it as a federal contractor.

U.S. Senator Kamala Harris questions Kevin McAleenan, United States Secretary of Homeland Security, about sexual abuse of immigrant children (2020).

On July 30, 2018, a federal judge ruled that government officials have been in violation of state child welfare laws when giving psychotropic drugs to migrant children without first seeking the consent of their parents or guardians. According to the ruling given by Judge Dolly Gee, staff members have admitted to signing off on medications in lieu of a parent, relative, or guardian. The judge also ordered that the government must move all children from the facility except for those deemed by a licensed professional to pose a "risk of harm" to themselves or others.

From 2014 to 2018, the Office of Refugee Resettlement received 4,556 allegations of sexual abuse or sexual harassment of immigrant children, 1,303 of which were referred to U.S. Justice Department.

=== Deterrence ===
Government data from 2018 suggests that the family separation policy did little to deter migrants from crossing the U.S. border illegally.

== Legal proceedings ==
=== Ms. L. v. ICE ===
Ms. L. v. ICE
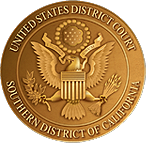
- Court: Southern District of California
- Started: February 26, 2018
- Docket nos.: 3:18-cv-00428 (S.D. Cal.); 18-56151 (9th Cir.)

Case history
- Prior action: Settlement reached on December 11, 2023; 2 years ago
- Appealed to: Ninth Circuit

Court membership
- Judge sitting: Dana Sabraw

In February 2018, the ACLU Immigrants' Rights Project representing an asylum seeker from the Democratic Republic of Congo filed Ms. L. v. ICE. In March 2018, the lawsuit was amended to seek a class action, prior to the official "zero tolerance" decision by Sessions. On June 26, Judge Dana Sabraw of the Southern District of California granted the class status and issued a nationwide preliminary injunction against the family-separation policy.

In his opinion, Sabraw wrote: "The facts set forth before the court portray reactive governance—responses to address a chaotic circumstance of the government's own making. They belie measured and ordered governance, which is central to the concept of due process enshrined in our Constitution. This is particularly so in the treatment of migrants, many of whom are asylum seekers and small children." Sabraw wrote that the federal government "readily keeps track of personal property of detainees in criminal and immigration proceedings", yet "has no system in place to keep track of, provide effective communication with, and promptly produce alien children". The injunction barred the U.S. government from separating parents and children at the border unless the adults presented a danger to children, and required the government to reunite separated families within thirty days, to reunite children under five with their parents within 14 days, and to permit all separated minors to speak with their parents within ten days.

In March 2019, Judge Sabraw issued a preliminary ruling which would potentially expand the number of migrants included in the American Civil Liberties lawsuit after newly released government documents identified thousands more families that had been separated as early as July 1, 2017. In his ruling Sabraw called the documents "undisputed" and commented, "The hallmark of a civilized society is measured by how it treats its people and those within its borders."

Judge Sabraw set a status hearing for July 6, 2018. On July 6, the Trump administration asked for more time to reunite migrant families separated, highlighting the challenge of confirming familial relationship between parents and children, with parents of 19 of 101 detained children under the age of five already deported according to a Department of Justice lawyer. The Judge set another deadline of Tuesday (July 10) for reunification, and gave the government until Saturday evening to create a list of all 101 youngest children along with an explanation of proposed difficulties. With the list the Judge believed that the two sides would be able to have "an intelligent conversation Monday (July 9) morning about which child can be reunited July 10, which can not—and then the court can determine whether it makes sense to relax the deadline".

In February 2021, President Biden signed Executive Order 14011 after which the parties entered into settlement negotiations. On December 11, 2023; 2 years ago, (the effective date) the settlement was approved. The termination date is six years after the effective date.

Asked about compensation, Biden says "$450,000 per person that's not going to happen"

The settlement:

- was expected to effect 4,500-5,000 children
- will make behavioral health services available
- will assist with certain medical costs
- provides legal access
- makes housing assistance available
- provides the opportunity to apply for parole and employment authorization for 3 years to certain class members
- limits the circumstances where children are separated (including to deter immigration) until the "Termination Date – Future Separations" (8 years after the effective date)
- does not pay
- provides mechanisms for reunification

Sabraw has found the second Trump administration to have breached the settlement. ICE detained or deported at least 25 people protected by the Ms. L settlement.

=== Grace v. Sessions ===
Charging the Trump Administration with initiating new government screening policies designed to bar immigrants from entering the country by preventing them from getting a fair hearing, on August 7, 2018, the ACLU filed Grace v. Sessions which focuses on migrants who have been placed in fast-track deportation proceedings known as "expedited removal". The lawsuit was filed on behalf of twelve migrants who failed their "credible fear" interviews, one of the first steps for asylum seekers in the fast-track removal process.

=== C.M. v. United States ===
C.M. v. United States
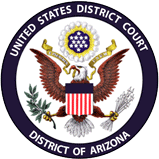
- Court: United States District Court for the District of Arizona
- Started: September 19, 2019
- Docket nos.: 2:19-cv-05217
- Verdict: dismissed with prejudice in October 2024

Outcome
- $1,353,000 settlement

Court membership
- Judge sitting: Susan Bolton

Keywords
- Federal Tort Claims Act

In September 2019, five asylum seeking parents filed C.M. v. United States under the Federal Tort Claims Act. In 2024, the court approved a $1,353,000 settlement after which the case was dismissed.

=== Challenge by 17 states ===
State of Washington v. United States
- Court: Western District of Washington; Southern District of California
- Full case name: State of Washington; Massachusetts; California; Maryland; Oregon; New Mexico; Pennsylvania; New Jersey; Iowa; Illinois; Minnesota; Rhode Island; Virginia; State of New York; Vermont; North Carolina; Delaware; and District of Columbia v. United States; Trump; Department of Homeland Security; ICE; United States Customs and Border Protection; USCIS; Department of Health And Human Services; Office of Refugee Resettlement; Kirstjen Nielsen; Tom Homan; Kevin McAleenan; Alex Azar; Scott Lloyd; and Jeff Sessions
- Started: June 26, 2018
- Docket nos.: 2:18-cv-00939 (W.D. Wash.); 3:18-cv-01979 (S.D. Cal.)

Court membership
- Judges sitting: Marsha J. Pechman; Dana Sabraw

On June 26, 2018, a separate legal challenge to the family separation was brought by 17 states (California, Delaware, Iowa, Illinois, Maryland, Massachusetts, Minnesota, New Jersey, New Mexico, New York, North Carolina, Oregon, Pennsylvania, Rhode Island, Vermont, Virginia, and Washington) against the Trump administration. The suit was filed in the U.S. District Court in Seattle. The plaintiff states, all of whom have Democratic state attorneys general, challenge the forcible separation of families as a "cruel and unlawful" violation of the constitution's Due Process and Equal Protection Clause. Washington Attorney General Bob Ferguson is leading the suit. California Attorney General Xavier Becerra, who represents California, called Trump's executive order putting a halt to the policy as an "empty and meaningless order that claims to take back policies that he [Trump] put in place himself as a political stunt".

In a new motion filed on July 2, the group asked for immediate information and access to those who are being detained. The motion included more than 900 pages of declarations from family members as well as others who have been involved in the separation of the families. On July 5, PBS Newshour reported on 12 of the 99 declarations that they believe "offer a window into what's has been happening under the family separation policy". PBS included information from the declaration of one mother who wrote that her 1-year-old son was taken from her at a legal point of entry in November. She said that when they were reunited after three months, he cried continually, and when she removed his clothing, she found him to be dirty and infected with lice. Others spoke of multiple detainees, including young children, held in very small rooms or cages, sometimes "freezing" cold, and without adequate bathroom facilities. Several others wrote of a lack of food, including food for children. One woman wrote that she was kept in a cell with nearly fifty other mothers, and they were told "that they could not eat because they were asking about their children".

=== Other court challenges ===
On August 23, 2018, the American Immigration Lawyers Association and the American Immigration Council filed a complaint with DHS alleging the "pervasive, and illegal, practice of coercing separated mothers and fathers into signing documents they may not have understood". According to the complaint, "the trauma of separation and detention creates an environment that is by its very nature coercive and makes it extremely difficult for parents to participate in legal proceedings affecting their rights". It also describes the use of "physical and verbal threats, the denial of food and water, the use of solitary confinement, the use of starvation, restrictions on feminine-hygiene products, and the use of pre-filled forms".

Separately, Beata Mariana de Jesus Mejia-Mejia, a Guatemalan woman, filed a federal lawsuit in the U.S. District Court for the District of Columbia in Washington challenging the Trump administration's practice on June 19, before the executive order. It is one of a small number of similar court challenges, with demands such as the immediate release of the child, an order prohibiting U.S. authorities from separating the family, and money for damages of pain and suffering.

Another lawsuit is that of a 9-year-old boy from Honduras who, according to the family, had fled with his father after his grandfather was murdered, was detained at the border and was separated from his father while sleeping. Another case is that of a 14-year-old girl who, so the lawsuit, had fled persecution in El Salvador and was lured away from her mother at a detention facility in Texas under the pretext of taking her to bathe. In both cases, the child was brought thousands of miles away.

On September 5, 2018, a federal lawsuit was filed to seek monetary damages on the basis of the inflicted psychological harm and the creation of a fund to support the mental health treatment of the children.

=== Flores filings ===
In 1997 the Flores settlement was signed into law. It says migrant children must be detained in the least-restrictive setting possible and only for about twenty days. On June 21, 2018, the Department of Justice (DoJ) asked U.S. District Court Judge Dolly Gee to alter her 2015 ruling in Reno v. Flores on the conditions of family detention by the Department of Homeland Security. The government seeks to end a 20-day limit on family detention and to end the requirement that children be held in day care centers that are state-licensed. The DoJ filing claims that limits on detention must be ended due to "a destabilizing migratory crisis". Attorney Peter Schey, who represents the child plaintiffs in Flores, vowed to oppose the filing. He filed an opposition on the grounds of there having been no significant change in circumstances warranting such a revision of the ruling. On June 29, the DoJ filed a statement that in future the Government will "detain families together during the pendency of immigration proceedings when they are apprehended at or between ports of entry" in place of separating them.

On July 9, Judge Gee denied the government's request to hold families together indefinitely in ICE facilities, and its request to exempt detention facilities from state licensing requirements for that purpose. Gee wrote: "Absolutely nothing prevents Defendants from reconsidering their current blanket policy of family detention and reinstating prosecutorial discretion."

On August 21, 2019, the Trump administration announced it was ending the Flores Agreement and replacing it with a new policy scheduled to take place in sixty days. The new policy will allow families with children to be detained indefinitely, until their cases are decided. Nineteen states and the District of Columbia have sued the Trump administration to block the administration plan to end the Flores Agreement. They claim that the new policy will result in the expansion of unlicensed detention centers allowing the administration to "set its own standards for care—in effect, licensing itself".

== Facilities involved ==
=== During separation ===
"Imagery from the Central Processing Center in McAllen, TX"—video from U.S. Customs and Border Protection Office of Public Affairs—Visual Communications Division

The Ursula detention facility, operated by Customs and Border Protection, in McAllen, Texas, in the Rio Grande Valley—On June 17, 2018, the facility housed 1,129 people, including 528 families and nearly 200 unaccompanied minor children. The facility has been called "the dog kennel" because chain link fencing is being used to create areas for those waiting to be processed, including children who have been separated from their parents. The caged areas are bare without toys or books for the children. Oregon Senator Jeff Merkley toured the facility in June and said that the parents were being told they would be separated from their children for "just a very short period—they go to a judge and then they're reunified [but] the reality is it's very hard for the parents to know where their kids are and to be able to connect with them".

=== Detention of parents ===
- Port Isabel Detention Center, operated by Immigration and Customs Enforcement, in Los Fresnos, Texas—This facility is surrounded by swampland and houses detained parents. Several members of Congress toured the facility in June and met with ten women who had been separated from their children. Some of them did not know where their children had been transferred to and none had been able to speak with a lawyer. One women said that she was told that her child would be put up for adoption. Rhode Island Representative David Cicilline said the women were uncontrollably sobbing.
- South Texas Detention Facility, operated by the GEO Group, in Pearsall, Texas
- Eloy Detention Center, owned and operated by CoreCivic, in Eloy, Arizona—This privately run immigration jail is ringed by barbed wire and an electrified fence. In late May 2018, detained parents had counted at least forty people who had been separated from their children among the 1,500 people detained in the facility; Immigration and Customs Enforcement did not release its own figures.
- Northwest Detention Center in Tacoma, Washington—Adults separated from their child relatives were transferred to this facility, which suffered a chicken pox outbreak in late June, preventing a visit by Congressman Derek Kilmer.

=== Detention of children ===
- Casa Padre, a private facility owned and operated by Southwest Key Programs, in Brownsville, Texas—A housing facility for children built in a former Walmart and operated under contract for the Department of Health and Human Services. On June 13, it housed 1,469 children, a plurality of whom arrived as unaccompanied minors crossing the border. Southwest Key estimated that five percent of children held there had been separated from their parents.
- Homestead Temporary Shelter for Unaccompanied Children in Homestead, Florida—A housing facility for around 1,100 children. Approximately seventy children separated from their families are housed at the facility. The facility had been opened and closed during the Obama administration and was recently reopened.

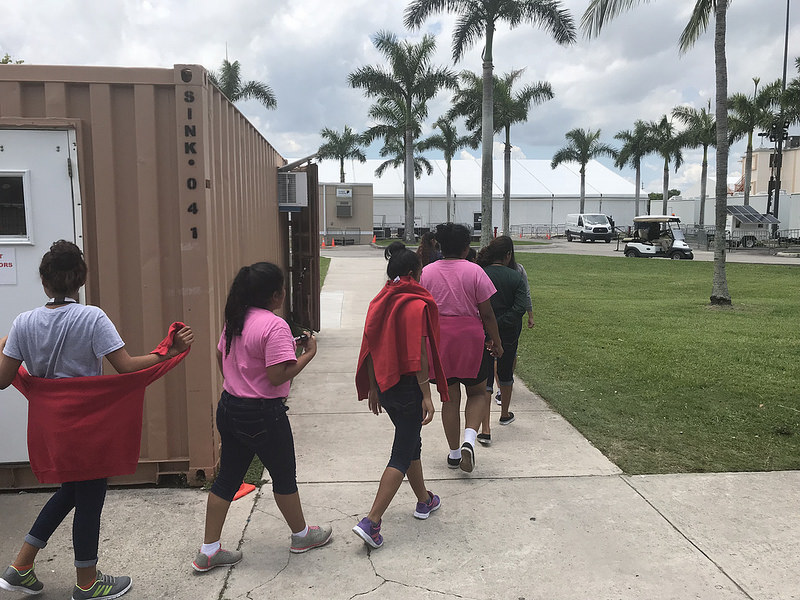
Unaccompanied minors walk in a Homestead, Florida, facility supervised by the Office of Refugee Resettlement, on June 20, 2018

- Estrella del Norte, a private facility owned and operated by Southwest Key Programs, in Tucson, Arizona—A 300-bed housing facility for children, that housed 287 children in mid-June 2018. A former staff member described conditions in the facility as increasingly "prison-like", and recounts being told to forbid siblings without their parent from hugging one another.
- Tornillo tent city, operated by the Federal government in Tornillo, Texas—Erected in the desert at the Marcelino Serna Port of Entry in western Texas. The site was chosen for a tent camp slated to house thousands of migrant children, including both unaccompanied minors and children separated from their parents. Representative Beto O'Rourke, who led a protest on Father's Day, June 17, 2018, was told that two hundred children were being detained in the camp, twenty percent of whom were separated from their parents.
- Three facilities in Combes, Raymondville and Brownsville (Casa El President, operated by Southwest Key), in southern Texas, have been set up to hold children under five and have been referred to as "tender age shelters". Medical professionals and lawyers who visited the facilities described "play rooms" filled with preschool children crying and in crisis. Colleen Kraft, the president of American Academy of Pediatrics, visited the Coombs facility and said she was "shaken" by what she saw, calling it "a heartbreaking scene" and unlike anything she'd seen in her decades as a pediatrician. She termed the practice of removing the children from their parents "government-sanctioned child abuse".

'Jacket Message Overshadows First Lady's Visit to Migrant Children', video from Voice of America

'First Lady Melania Trump Visits Texas', video from the White House

- Upbring New Hope Children's Shelter in McAllen, Texas. As of June 21, about sixty children were housed in this facility, including six who had been separated from their parents while the remaining children had arrived alone. According to American Academy of Pediatrics President Colleen Draft, this center, like other centers, confiscates any possessions the child may arrive with and care givers are not allowed to comfort or touch the children. Following Trump's June 20 executive order to stop separating undocumented immigrant parents and their children, on June 21 First Lady Melania Trump visited this facility saying, "I'm here to learn about your facility, in which I know you house children on a long-term basis and I'd also like to ask you how I can help these children to reunite with their families as quickly as possible." Critics have argued that this visit did not give the First Lady an accurate look at what many have called an unfolding crisis. She was also widely criticized for wearing a jacket that on the back stated "I Really Don't Care, Do U" when she boarded the plane for her trip to the facility.
- An East Harlem, New York shelter run by Cayuga Centers, Children's Village in Dobbs Ferry, New York, and additional shelters in Long Island, in Westchester and the Bronx are among nine facilities in New York state housing separated children. In a June 22 interview New York Governor Andrew Cuomo said that he believes that HHS sent about 700 children to his state, but he is not certain because HHS has refused to release any information about the children. The Governor said that he also contacted the foster care agencies in his state in an attempt to assess the number of children and to make sure that their needs were being met, but HHS had put a gag order on the agencies and they were not able to disclose any information either. He was allowed to visit one facility and the staff there told him that the children in their care "have a high level of psychological trauma [and] anxiety disorders".

=== Proposed facilities ===
"B-Roll of Temporary Soft Sided Facilities Donna, Texas"—video from U.S. Customs and Border Protection Office of Public Affairs—Visual Communications Division

- Houston facility for young children, pregnant girls, and teenage mothers—Southwest Key has leased a 53,600-square-foot building—419 Emancipation Avenue—formerly occupied by the non-profit Star of Hope in Houston, Texas, and applied to use it as a detention center for up to 200 migrant youth "from age 0 to 17". Advocates report that the facility would house "children younger than 12 as well as pregnant and nursing teenagers"; the Department of Health and Human Services refers to this younger age group as "tender-age children" Houston Mayor Sylvester Turner opposes the facility and has urged the Texas state government not to license it. At a press conference, Turner said, "I do not want to be an enabler in this process. I do not want the city to participate in this process. The health department has yet to provide a food permit or shelter permit. ... If we don't speak, if we don't say no, then these types of policies will continue."
- Military detention camp for migrant families at Fort Bliss
- Military detention camp for migrant children on Goodfellow Air Force Base

== Reunification ==
=== Trump Administration ===
Authorities had separated families without a plan to reunite them, resulting in numerous cases of parents and children having no contact since being forcefully separated. According to a Boston Globe investigation, it was difficult to reconnect children to their parents because children and parents entered two separate systems: parents were put in ICE custody and then entered the U.S. Department of Homeland Security to face criminal prosecution while children were classified as an "unaccompanied alien child" and transferred to the U.S. Department of Health and Human Services. Therefore, authorities no longer tracked them as a family unit and there was no system in place to reunite them. On June 23, 2018, DHS falsely claimed it and HHS had a "central database" for tracking migrants; the Department's Inspector General "found no evidence that such a database exists".

Efforts to reunify families began within HHS in late June 2018. Alex Azar, then Secretary of HHS, requested that Scott Lloyd from the Office of Refugee Resettlement (ORR) find the parents of separated children who were housed by HHS. Lloyd told Azar that the parents were in ICE custody; he could not provide more specific information. Lloyd had previously told his staff at ORR not to maintain lists of separated children, despite his staff insisting that such lists would be necessary for any future reunification effort.

Frustrated with Lloyd, Azar delegated reunification efforts to Robert Kadlec, who was the assistant secretary of preparedness and response at HHS. Because Kadlec had little experience with the HHS shelter system, he put the project under the direction of Jonathan White, a social worker at HHS who had previously worked in ORR, where he had opposed the policy of family separation. Kadlec and White then began attempting to identify which of the approximately 12,000 children in HHS care had been separated from their parents at the border. Kadlec described the disturbing process of shifting through the photographs: "You could just see that what was happening was devastating to these kids ... Some of the children were infants. Some were 1 and 2 years old, 5 years old, 10 years old."

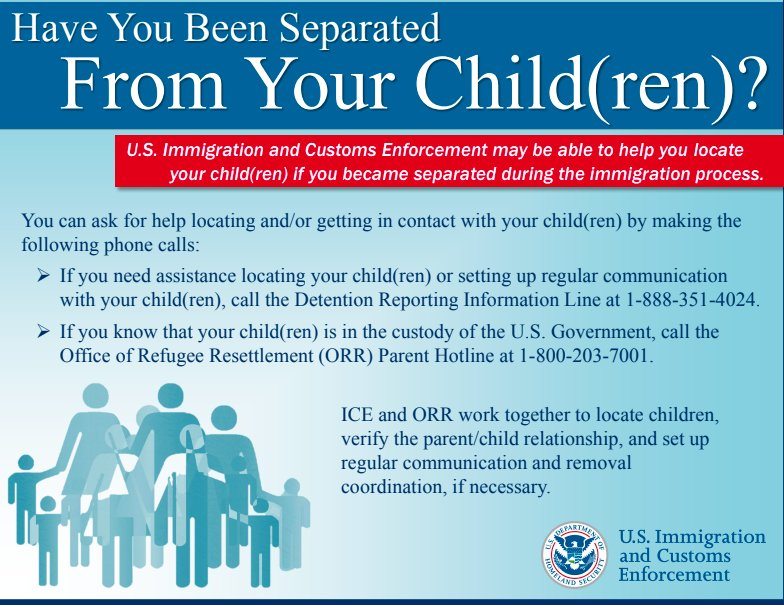
A flyer circulated by the Department of Homeland Security in 2018 offered assistance to parents separated from their children while in custody. A Spanish version was also distributed.

After the formation of the HHS reunification task force, Immigration and Customs Enforcement officials attempted to block reunification efforts, according to internal emails. Matthew Albence, head of enforcement and removal operations at ICE, told his colleagues that reunification "wasn't going to happen unless we are directed by the Dept to do so."

=== ACLU involvement ===
The American Civil Liberties Union (ACLU), through a class action lawsuit, attempted to speed the reunification process. On June 26, 2018, Dana Sabraw, the federal judge overseeing the case, ordered all separated children under five years old be reunified with parents within two weeks, and all children be reunited with their parents within thirty days.

Azar declared on July 5, 2018, that the government would meet the July 10 deadline for uniting children under five with their parents, and stated that DNA testing was being used to speed up matching parents and children. On July 25, ACLU filed a submission setting out that some of the parents had been misled to relinquish their right to reunite with their children.

"Separated Parent's Removal Form" gives a parent being deported the option of leaving their child[ren] behind.

The government failed to meet the deadline set by Judge Sabraw, and on August 1 she declared that the lack of progress was "just unacceptable". On August 2, the Justice Department filed in court that the ACLU should take responsibility for reuniting families, rather than the federal government. The ACLU responded by stating that while they are ready to help, the burden of responsibility for finding parents of minors separated at the border was the government's responsibility. The ACLU formed a steering committee to help reunite families, working with the law firm Paul, Weiss and representatives from several NGOs. The Trump administration did not supply the steering committee with phone numbers for deported parents for several months, and it was another year before the HHS inspector general provided the names of 1,500 additional families that had been separated.

In October 2020, ACLU lawyers submitted a court filing with an update saying they had not yet been able to reach the parents of 545 separated children, with about two-thirds of the parents believed to be somewhere in Central America. The lawyers reported that it had been difficult to locate the parents of about 1,500 children who had been taken from their parents in 2017, during the pilot program, because many of those parents were deported without their children and records were not kept. The Trump administration refused funding or assistance to help find the missing parents; NGOs and the ACLU provided both volunteer workers and covered all expenses related to the search. Speaking on PBS, ACLU head attorney Lee Gelernt said, "When there are families in the U.S. who have finally been reunited, and they have gone through this horrific situation, you would think the Trump administration would say, OK, we will let them stay. But, in fact, what most people don't know is, the Trump administration is trying to deport all of these previously separated families." The ACLU said that the COVID-19 pandemic added to the difficulty of finding parents, but they were committed to reuniting all of the remaining children.

=== Biden administration ===
One month after taking office in January 2021, President Biden signed an executive order establishing a family reunification task force within the government to work with the ACLU steering committee. The executive order also created a pathway for parents who had been deported while separated from their children to return to the United States to reunite with their children. A review done by the Biden administration in 2021 found that more than 1,400 parents had been deported without their children.

== Reactions ==
=== Opposition and condemnation ===
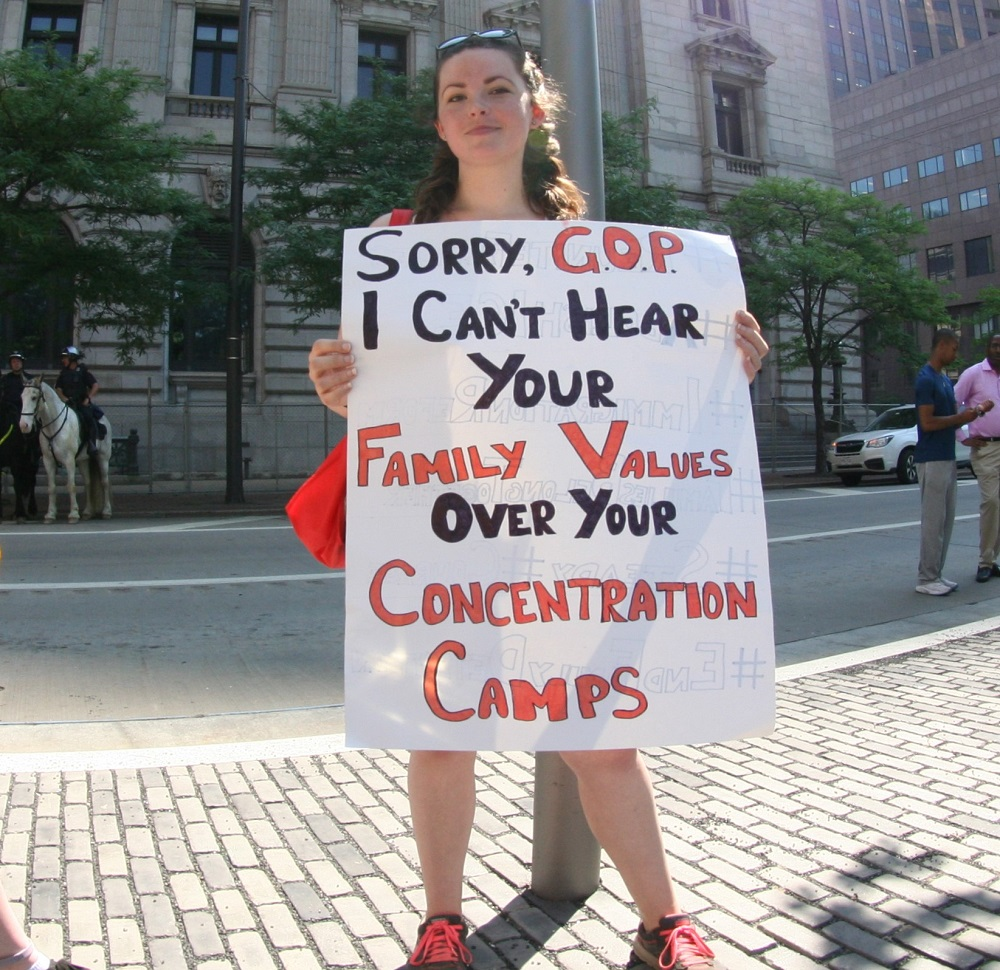
A protester compares child detention by the government to concentration camps

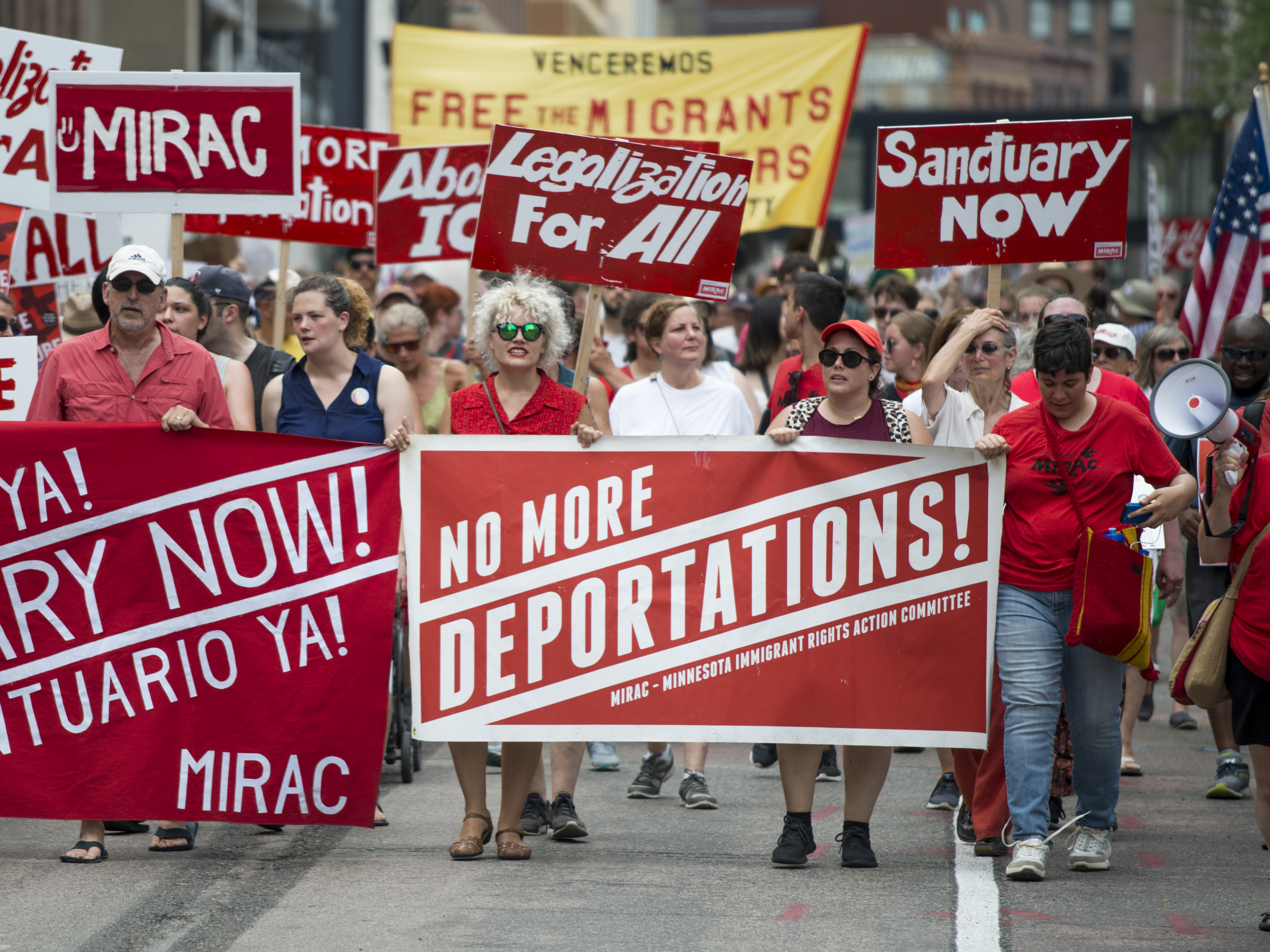
About ten thousand people gathered in downtown Minneapolis and marched through the streets to call for U.S. Immigration and Customs Enforcement (ICE) to be abolished.

The policy attracted significant condemnation from a wide array of sources including medical, scientific, religious and human rights groups. In January 2018, following testimony from Department of Homeland Security Secretary Kirstjen Nielsen in which she refused to rule out implementing the proposed policy of the separation of parents from their children, more than 200 child welfare organizations released a letter calling for the Trump administration to abandon plans to forcibly separate children from their parents at the U.S. border. The letter said, in part: "We know that this policy would have significant and long-lasting consequences for the safety, health, development, and well-being of children. Children need to be cared for by their parents to be safe and healthy, to grow and develop. Forced separation disrupts the parent-child relationship and puts children at increased risk for both physical and mental illness. The Administration's plan would eviscerate the principle of family unity and put children in harm's way." A June 2018 survey found it to be very unpopular with the public, with approximately 25 percent of Americans supporting the policy. Some politicians and observers have compared the detainment of children by the U.S. government to concentration camps.

==== Medical and scientific community ====
The policy has been condemned by the American Academy of Pediatrics, the American College of Physicians, the American Psychological Association and the American Psychiatric Association, with the American Academy of Pediatrics saying that the policy has caused "irreparable harm" to the children. Together, they represent more than 250,000 doctors in the United States. Pediatrician Nadine Burke Harris described the family separation policy as "a recipe for toxic stress". Dr. Irwin Redlener, who co-founded Children's Health Fund, called the policy "dehumanizing" and described it as a form of child abuse. A number of concerned researchers and clinicians signed an open letter to Homeland Security Secretary Nielsen calling on her to end the migrant child separations, writing, "Decades of psychological and brain research have demonstrated that forced parental separation and placement in incarceration-like facilities can have profound immediate, long-term, and irreparable harm on infant and child development."

==== Religious groups ====
Many religious groups opposed the policy including Christian organizations such as:

- The United States Conference of Catholic Bishops
- The National Association of Evangelicals
- The Greek Orthodox Archdiocese of America
- Episcopal Church
- United Methodist Church
- African Methodist Episcopal Church
- Presbyterian Church
- Evangelical Lutheran Church
- United Church of Christ
- The Church of Jesus Christ of Latter-day Saints

In response to a criticism of the policy by a cardinal of the Roman Catholic Church, Attorney General Jeff Sessions defended the policy, citing the Bible. On June 18, a group of more than 600 United Methodist Church clergy and laity announced that they were bringing church law charges against Attorney General Jeff Sessions. The members of the group accused Sessions of "child abuse, immorality, racial discrimination and dissemination of doctrines contrary to the standards of the doctrine of the United Methodist Church". The last charge refers to Sessions' "misuse" of Romans 13, which he quoted to argue that secular law must always be obeyed. The charges were dismissed in August 2018.

All four major denominations of American Judaism opposed the policy:

- Reform
- Conservative
- Orthodox
- Reconstructionist

Islamic organizations also opposed the policy.

Pope Francis supported statements by U.S. Catholic bishops who called the policy "contrary to our Catholic values" and "immoral", adding "It's not easy, but populism is not the solution."

Evangelist Franklin Graham, son of evangelist Billy Graham, called the practice "disgraceful" and said "it's terrible to see families ripped apart and I don't support that one bit." Graham did not, however, attach blame to Trump or his administration, but rather blamed "the politicians for the last 20–30 years that have allowed this to escalate to where it is today".

==== Academia ====
Many professors and administrators in colleges and universities have likened the policy to the internment of Japanese Americans during World War II. Open letters signed by various scholars denounced the policy and called for its halt.

==== Civil rights and humanitarian groups ====
A large number of civil rights groups, humanitarian organizations, and other groups condemned the family separation policy, including the Anti-Defamation League, the Lawyers' Committee for Civil Rights Under Law, the League of Women Voters of the United States, the International Rescue Committee, the NAACP, and the National Immigration Law Center.

The Tahirih Justice Center has criticized that the policy of charging asylum seekers with a criminal offense, and subsequent separation of families, is contrary to Article 31 of the Refugee Convention. This Article prohibits any party to the Convention from imposing penalties on asylum seekers on account of their illegal entry or presence, provided the asylum seekers present themselves without delay to the authorities and show good cause for their illegal entry or presence. Thus according to international law, such asylum seekers are not liable to criminal prosecution for illegal entry. The United States ratified the 1967 Protocol of the Refugee Convention in 1968, and thereby obliged itself to adhere to Articles 2 through 34 of the Convention.

The director for the Americas at the International Secretariat of Amnesty International, Erika Guevara Rosas, has said that the "severe mental suffering that officials have intentionally inflicted on these families for coercive purposes, means that these acts meet the definitions of torture under both U.S. and international law".

Human Rights Watch said the policy constituted enforced disappearance and may have constituted torture.

==== Congress ====
Forty Democratic United States Senators sent a letter to Trump urging him to "rescind this unethical, ineffective, and inhumane policy and instead prioritize approaches that align with our humanitarian and American values". In response to the policy, Senator Dianne Feinstein introduced a bill, Keep Families Together Act (S. 3036), under which the separation of a child from its parents would be allowed only under very specific conditions. By June 18, the entire Democratic caucus of 49 senators (including the two independents who caucus with the Democrats) had signed on as cosponsors.

Republicans in Congress fell into four groups on the child-separation policy:

- The vast majority of Republicans in Congress kept silent on the policy, seeking to avoid a confrontation with Trump.
- Other congressional Republicans, such as Representative Steve King of Iowa, supported the policy.
- Some congressional Republicans, such as Senator Dean Heller of Nevada and Representative Kevin Cramer of North Dakota, expressed disagreement with the policy but avoided strongly criticizing Trump.
- Another group of congressional Republicans were strongly critical of the policy, including members who are frequent Trump critics (for example, Senators Jeff Flake, John McCain, Ben Sasse, and Susan Collins), but also some who are usually aligned with Trump (for example, Senator Orrin Hatch).

Republican Senator Ted Cruz initially defended the policy in a June 11 interview. On June 18, despite his previous support of the policy, Cruz announced that he would introduce his own legislation, criticizing the Democrats' bill as "returning to the failed policy of 'catch and release'". Cruz said his bill would end the separation policy by authorizing the construction of shelters to house families, expedite asylum cases, and increase the number of federal immigration judges. Senate Minority Leader Chuck Schumer criticized Cruz's proposal, arguing that the Republicans would include "unacceptable additions" and instead urged Trump to end the policy using an executive order.

In February 2019, Democratic Representative for Illinois Jan Schakowsky described the family separation policy as "state-sponsored child abuse [and] kidnapping of children".

==== Governors ====
In early 2018, Trump requested that state governors send National Guard troops to the U.S.–Mexico border. In response to the family-separation policy, at least eight governors either recalled National Guard troops from the U.S.–Mexico border or declined to send them to the border. States that withdrew troops, reversed plans to send troops, or declined to send troops were New York, North Carolina, Virginia, Colorado, Delaware, and Rhode Island (which all had Democratic governors) and Maryland and Massachusetts (which both had Republican governors). Democratic Governor John Carney of Delaware, for example, said "Under normal circumstances, we wouldn't hesitate to answer the call. But given what we know about the policies currently in effect at the border, I can't in good conscience send Delawareans to help with that mission." (Some additional states—Vermont and Oregon—had declined Trump's request before the family-separation policy had been implemented.)

Among Republican governors, some supported Trump's policy of separating families (Phil Bryant of Mississippi, Henry McMaster of South Carolina), while others opposed the policy (Pete Ricketts of Nebraska, Bruce Rauner of Illinois, John Kasich of Ohio).

==== UN and international bodies ====
The policy has also been condemned by the Office of the United Nations High Commissioner for Human Rights. High Commissioner Zeid Ra'ad Al Hussein called it an "unconscionable" effort by a state to deter parents by abusing children.

United Nations special rapporteurs from the Human Rights Council have also condemned the policy, and have stated that detention of children "is punitive, severely hampers their development, and in some cases may amount to torture". The rapporteurs have called its rescission insufficient.

The Inter-American Commission on Human Rights has formally requested additional information from the U.S. government on the location and plans for affected children.

==== Others ====
All four living former first ladies of the United States—Rosalynn Carter, Hillary Clinton, Laura Bush, and Michelle Obama—condemned the policy of separating children from their parents. First Lady Melania Trump's office issued a statement saying, "[Mrs. Trump] believes we need to be a country that follows all laws, but also a country that governs with heart." Laura Bush wrote an op-ed in The Boston Globe condemning the use of practices "reminiscent of the internment camps for U.S. citizens and noncitizens of Japanese descent during World War II, now considered to have been one of the most shameful episodes in U.S. history".

A bipartisan group of 75 former U.S. attorneys published an open letter to Attorney General Jeff Sessions, calling for an end to the policy, writing that the policy inflicts "unnecessary trauma and suffering of innocent children" and "is a radical departure from previous Justice Department policy" that "is dangerous, expensive, and inconsistent with the values of the institution in which we served". The former U.S. attorneys also pointed out that the policy is not required by law. An employment law firm offered free legal advice to federal and state workers who refused to enforce the policy.

Fox News commentator Andrew Napolitano has criticised the policy, stating that he believes that "it is child abuse to separate children from their parents unless it's necessary to save a human life ... there's a federal statute that says you can't separate them more than 72 hours." News anchor Jorge Ramos declared that the policy violated both Article 1 of the United Nations Convention against Torture (UNCAT) that forbids torture, and Article 9 of the Convention on the Rights of the Child (CRC) that states that a child shall not be separated from his or her parents against their will. The U.S. has signed and ratified the UNCAT, and signed but not yet ratified the CRC.

Family separations were widely condemned in the business community, including by conservative groupings like the United States Chamber of Commerce and the Business Roundtable.

On June 20, 2018, three airlines—American Airlines, United Airlines and Frontier Airlines—each issued a statement requesting the federal government not to use their planes to transport migrant children who were taken from their parents. The previous day, a veteran flight attendant for a major airline recounted an episode in which an ICE agent initially told another flight attendant that the migrant children on their flight were members of a soccer team, but "when pressed, the agent finally admitted that they were, indeed children who were being relocated to assigned camps".

In February 2019, Commander Jonathan White of the Department of Health and Human Services testified that neither he nor his long-term colleagues within the Office of Refugee Resettlement would have supported a policy that would result in the separation of children and parents. He also testified that when, in February 2017, before the implementation of the policy, he had raised concerns about the prospect of family separations, he was consistently told that no such policy was pending.

==== Protests ====
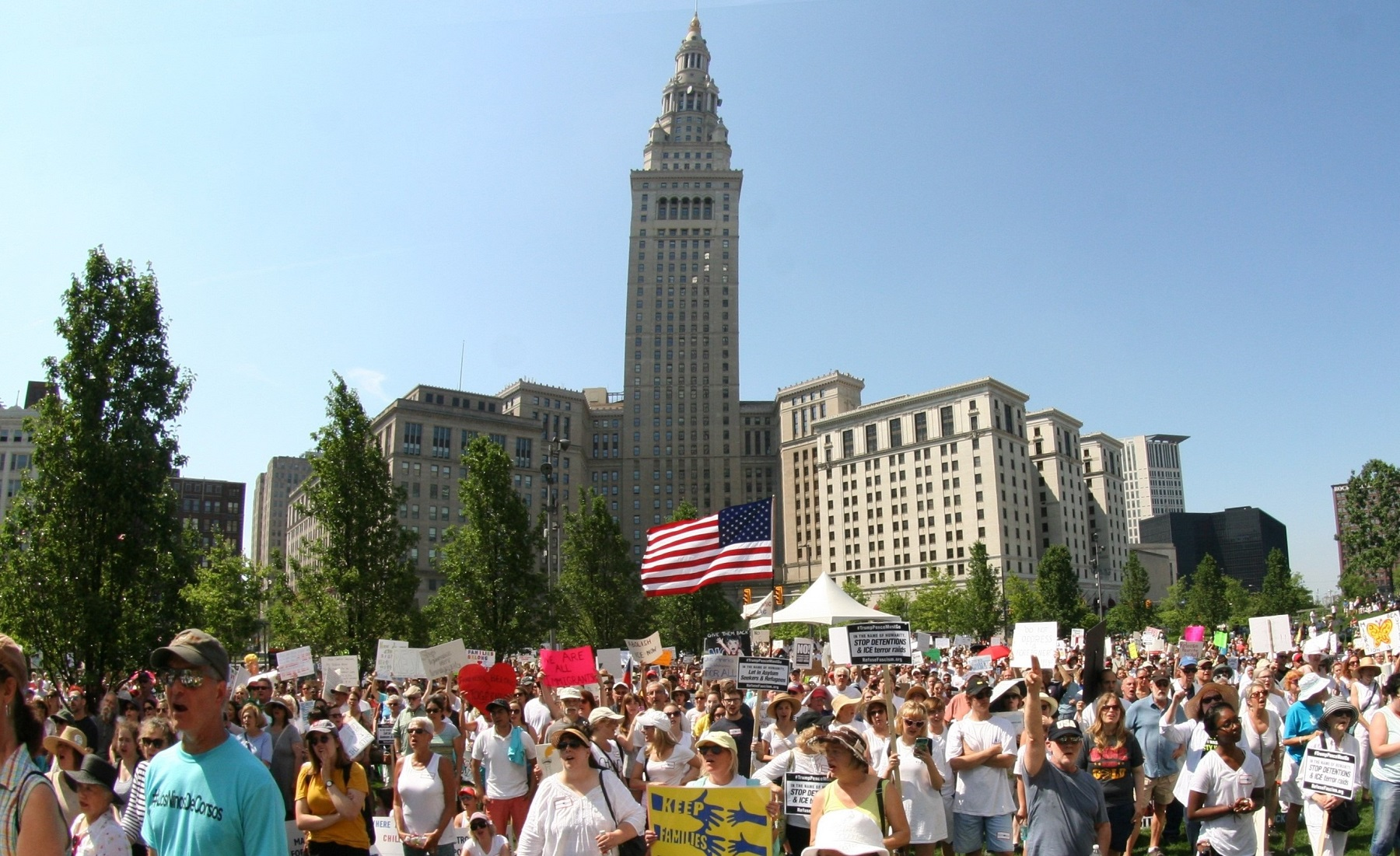
Rally to end family separation in Cleveland, Ohio (June 30, 2018)

Beginning in June 2018, protests were held in numerous cities across the nation as plans for larger nationwide protests were being formulated. On June 30, a national protest organized by the newly-formed group "Keep Families Together" was held which drew hundreds of thousands of protesters from all fifty states to demonstrate in more than 600 towns and cities. Approximately 30,000 marchers crossing the Brooklyn Bridge in New York City, chanted, "Immigrants built this bridge." Some demonstration speakers stressed the urgent need for political activism. In Atlanta Representative John Lewis spoke saying, "We've got to get out and vote like we never voted before." Lin-Manuel Miranda performed for the protesters, singing a song from his musical Hamilton, and commented, "We will not stand for a country separating children from their families, and if you are silent on that issue, or you are somehow for that issue you're not getting re-elected."

==== Fundraising response ====
Inspired by a viral photo of a crying two-year-old girl looking up at her mother, on June 16, 2018, a California couple started a fund-raising campaign on Facebook named "Reunite an immigrant parent with their child" with a goal of raising $1,500. Within the first few days the campaign was raising over $4,000 a minute and in a little over a week's time it had raised over $20 million, breaking a Facebook record for donations. The money will go to the Refugee and Immigrant Center for Education and Legal Services, or RAICES, and provide legal aid for immigrant parents who have been arrested at the border.

The photograph was taken by professional photographer, John Moore, just after the mother was asked to set her child down to be body-searched before boarding the Border Patrol van and the little girl began to cry. The mother is from Honduras and had been traveling for a month. The photo raised controversy after the father of the child said in an interview that the mother and daughter were now being detained together in McAllen, Texas. This has caused many in Trump's administration to rally against "fake news" with White House Spokeswoman Sarah Sanders tweeting that the Democrats and media "exploited this photo of a little girl to push their own agenda".

==== Public opinion ====
The family-separation policy is unpopular among Americans, as shown by four polls; on average, two-thirds of Americans oppose the policy. There is a strong partisan divide; the average of polls showed that Democrats are overwhelmingly opposed to the policy (8% support, 87% oppose, 5% other) while a plurality of Republicans favor it (49% support, 35% oppose, 16% other). Trump's approval rating fell to 41 percent, with a 55 percent disapproval rating according to a Gallup poll following increased public awareness of the policy.

==== White House ====
According to a report by Gabriel Sherman, the policy caused "chaos" and infighting among the White House staff and advisers. Sarah Huckabee Sanders was "frustrated" according to one of her friends. On the other hand, according to one White House adviser, Stephen Miller "actually enjoys seeing those pictures at the border", referring to the photographs of children separated from their parents.

=== Support ===
White House Press Secretary Sarah Huckabee Sanders, Senator Chuck Grassley and House Speaker Paul Ryan have asserted that the Trump administration are required to separate migrant families due to the 1997 Flores settlement, which requires that unaccompanied minors be released to their parents or relatives, and if a relative cannot be found then a government agency can appoint an appropriate guardian for the child. Trump administration officials also cited the Trafficking Victims Protection Reauthorization Act of 2008 (TVPRA), a 2008 anti-human trafficking statute, as a justification for the policy. Neither the Flores settlement nor the TVPRA, however, require or recommend family separations.

Following Trump's executive order ending family separation David French criticized the Democrat's position saying, "those of us with a trace of historical memory know that the Trump administration is merely asking the courts and Congress to adopt the Obama administration's legal position. ... But despite this victory, Democrats are still furious. It's not enough to stop child separation. Now, they want to prevent family detention entirely." Conservative commentator Ann Coulter on June 17 dismissed immigrant children as "child actors weeping and crying" and urged Trump not to "fall for it". Fox News television host Laura Ingraham on June 18, 2018, described the facilities where migrant children were housed as "essentially summer camps". She described criticism of the immigration policies as "faux liberal outrage".

Fox & Friends co-host Brian Kilmeade defended Trump's family separation policy, arguing that migrant children are being treated as though they are more important than "people in our country who pay taxes and have needs as well". He states, "Like it or not, these aren't our kids. Show them compassion, but it's not like [Trump is] doing this to the people of Idaho or Texas. These are people from another country."

=== Trump administration response ===
On June 19, 2018, a fact checker for The Washington Post critiqued a number of statements by Trump and members of his administration, characterizing them as "Orwellian stuff" and designating them as Four Pinocchios—the Post's highest rating of falsehood. The Trump administration had offered at least 14 contradictory statements about its policy, including contradictions about whether it was a Justice Department policy, whether separations are a deterrent, whether there was a prepared process to separate families, and whether separations are required by law. Trump has also said that he could not reverse his administration's policy via executive order, while later writing an executive order to reverse the policy.

==== President Donald Trump ====
Trump said in response to the situation: "I hate to see separation of parents and children ... I hate the children being taken away." Trump has blamed the Democrats for "that law" (also calling it "their law" and "the horrible law") on a number of occasions despite there being no law to mandate the separation of migrant parents and children. The Trump administration's own "zero tolerance" policy, announced on April 6, 2018, is responsible for spurring the separations. Trump also said he "certainly wouldn't sign the more moderate" immigration bill proposed by leaders of the House of Representatives with input from moderate Republicans and the White House.

On June 20, 2018, Trump announced that he would sign an executive order to end family separations, saying "We're going to keep families together but we still have to maintain toughness or our country will be overrun by people, by crime." He did so later the same day.

On June 22, 2018, Trump sent a tweet saying that congressional Republicans should "stop wasting their time on immigration" and should wait until after the November midterm elections to pass immigration legislation. Trump continued to attempt to rally support, by hosting "Angel Families" families whose loved ones had been killed by illegal immigrants (at the White House on June 23). Fact checks following Trump's press conference noted that illegal immigrants are 25% less likely than native-born Americans to commit homicide and are 11.5% less likely to commit sexual assault than native-born Americans, that when more illegal immigrants move into a neighborhood, violent crime goes down.

Trump has repeatedly and falsely said that he inherited the family separation policy from the previous president, Barack Obama. In November 2018, Trump said: "President Obama separated children from families, and all I did was take the same law, and then I softened the law". In April 2019, Trump said: "President Obama separated children. They had child separation; I was the one that changed it". In June 2019, Trump said: "President Obama had a separation policy. I didn't have it. He had it. I brought the families together. I'm the one that put them together ... I inherited separation, and I changed the plan". Trump's assertion was false because the Obama administration had no policy systematically separating migrant families, while the "zero tolerance" policy was only instituted by Trump's own administration in April 2018. PolitiFact quoted immigration experts that "family separations were relatively rare", and at a lower scale, before the Trump administration.

==== Homeland Security Secretary Kirstjen Nielsen ====
During a June 18, 2018, White House press conference, Homeland Security Secretary Kirstjen Nielsen contended that during the first five months of fiscal 2018, there was a "314% increase in adults showing up with kids [posing as] a family unit. Those are traffickers, those are smugglers, that is MS-13, those are criminals, those are abusers." Using DHS data, analysis by The Washington Post found that such groups constituted 0.61% of "family units" apprehended at the border during that period.

In the same press conference she said, "We now care for them. ... We have high standards. We give them meals. We give them education. We give them medical care. There's videos, there's TVs ..." and stated when asked about family separation that a "vast majority" of children held are unaccompanied minors. On June 19, 2018, Nielsen was heckled by protesters shouting "Shame! Shame! ... If kids don't eat in peace, you don't eat in peace", as she ate in a Mexican restaurant.

==== Attorney General Jeff Sessions ====
Sessions' role in implementing the family separation policy was to instruct hesitant U.S. attorneys along the Mexican border to go through with the policy.

Following Christian opposition to the policy, Sessions controversially defended it by citing the thirteenth chapter of the Epistle to the Romans in the New Testament, saying "I would cite you to the Apostle Paul and his clear and wise command in Romans 13, to obey the laws of the government because God has ordained them for the purpose of order." Several commentators noted that before the Civil War, Romans 13 was used by advocates of slavery to justify it, and to attack abolitionists.

On June 19, 2018, Sessions disputed claims by former CIA Director Michael Hayden that the separation of the immigrant families at the border was similar to Nazi concentration camps. During the interview he said that the comparisons were inaccurate as the Nazis "were keeping the Jews from leaving the country". In the same interview, he said that if the parents are deported, the children return with them, but if the parents claim asylum and stay, the children are put into HHS custody.

==== Other officials ====
In April 2019, Acting Homeland Security Secretary Kevin McAleenan said that the Trump administration "always intended to" reunite separated families.

In July 2019, Customs and Border Protection (CBP) Chief of Law Enforcement Operations Brian Hastings, testified before Congress that CBP deported parents without any knowledge on whether the child was reunited with their parents before the deportation. Hastings said that questions on reunification should be directed to HHS. Hastings additionally testified that there was no "minimum time" between telling migrant parents that a family separation would occur and the actual family separation.

== 2022 update ==
In 2022, journalist Caitlin Dickerson, writing in The Atlantic, reported on the long term effects of the sudden, forced separations on the children and parents. She also investigated the history of the separation policy, tracing its roots back to September 11. She interviewed a caseworker at a child detention facility who said that she and the other staff felt it "was unlike anything they'd ever seen," with the separated children completely inconsolable. Therapists working with the children and families said the need for therapy would continue.

Dickerson reported on the governmental employees most involved in the separation policy including: Kevin McAleenan, the head of Customs and Border Protection (CBP); Tom Homan, the head of ICE; Kirstjen Nielsen, the Department of Homeland Security (DHS) secretary; the highest-ranking law enforcement official responsible for the policy, Attorney General Jeff Sessions; and Steven Miller. Dickerson labeled this group the "hawks". None of them, except Nielsen, granted her an interview. Nielsen told her that she regretted her decisions to go along with the plan.

Dickerson wrote that the removal of children from their parents was not an accidental result of attempts to limit illegal immigration, but was an attempt to permanently remove children and thus discourage people from entering through the Mexican border. Her investigation revealed that while the hawks invented the zero tolerance and family separation plans, those she called "the bureaucrats, the career experts", who went along with the plans, were as important in the implementation of the program. The bureaucrats granted her numerous interviews. She writes:

They told me they were very concerned about separating families, but they stayed quiet. And when I asked why, they said, 'well, it wasn't strategic to speak up in these meetings' or, 'you know, I couldn't alienate myself before Stephen Miller, given how much power he had in the administration.' They figured someone else would intervene, and because of that, this policy was put into place.

Dickerson's investigation "We need to take away children" earned the 2023 Pulitzer Prize for Explanatory Reporting.

== Legacy ==
In November 2024, Donald Trump announced that Thomas Homan, who played a role in the inception of the separation policy, would be appointed "border czar", responsible for deportations. Homan was asked if families would be separated during deportation and he replied, "Families can be deported together."

In January 2025, it was estimated that 1,000 families separated under the first Trump administration had not yet been reunited.

In February 2025, Reuters reported that ICE planned to locate over 600,000 people who entered the U.S. as children without their parents, some of whom were no longer children and some of whom had rejoined and were living with parents, and either deport the children, if deportation had already been ordered, or serve notice to appear in immigration court. On March 6, 2025, ICE began to detain migrant parents and children together in a Texas detention facility. The first group contained 3 minor children.

An October 2025 review of immigration service and flight records found cases where migrant children had been misclassified as unaccompanied or otherwise separated from their parents, who were then moved between several ICE detention facilities. Advocates feared this could lead to indefinite separations should the government lose track of where it was sending parents and their children.

Separation was reported to be occurring after the first Trump presidency.

The impact of deportation in the second presidency of Donald Trump on mixed status families has been compared to family separation in the first presidency.

== See also ==
- Child displacement
- Deportation in the second presidency of Donald Trump
- Family immigration detention in the United States
- Flores Agreement
- Prison–industrial complex
- Migrant detentions under the first Trump administration
- Unaccompanied Alien Children in U.S. immigration detention

Protests:

- Abolish ICE
- Occupy ICE
- Protests against the Trump administration family separation policy
