= Scott Lloyd (lawyer) =

American lawyer (born 1979)

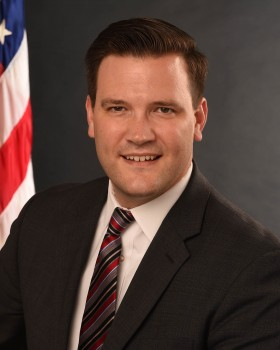

Director of the Office of Refugee Resettlement
- In office March 2017 – November 2018
- President: Donald Trump
- Preceded by: Kenneth Tota (acting)
- Succeeded by: Jonathan Hayes (acting)

Personal details
- Born: Edward Scott Lloyd; August 22, 1979 (age 46)
- Children: 7
- Education: James Madison University (BA); Catholic University (JD)

Edward Scott Lloyd (born August 22, 1979) is an American lawyer who served as the director of the Office of Refugee Resettlement (ORR). He ran the ORR during the period when it oversaw the detention of children who were separated from their families under the Trump Administration's family separation policy. Lloyd went on to serve as a senior advisor in the Center for Faith and Opportunity Initiatives.

== Education ==
Lloyd received his undergraduate education at James Madison University and earned his J.D. from the Columbus School of Law. He is licensed in Virginia.

== Career ==
Lloyd was an elementary English and social studies teacher before attending law school. He worked in private practice, at the Department of Health and Human Services (IOS/OGC), and on Capitol Hill (Government Reform Subcommittee on Criminal Justice, Drug Policy, and Human Resources). Lloyd worked for the Knights of Columbus where he served as an attorney in the public policy office. In that capacity, he helped shape the organization's humanitarian response and led its policy advocacy on behalf of the ethnic and religious minorities who are victims of ISIS.

In March 2017, Lloyd became the Director of the Office of Refugee Resettlement (ORR). Lloyd oversaw the ORR when it was responsible for housing children who had been separated from their families as part of the Trump Administration's family separation policy. Lloyd repeatedly declined to intervene when subordinates within the ORR expressed alarm about the harm that the policy inflicted on children. When James De La Cruz and other members of the ORR began compiling a list of the separated children, Lloyd directed them to stop because the list made “it look like something that isn’t happening is happening." Cruz emphasized that the list was necessary to any future effort to reunite children with their families. Lloyd allegedly told his subordinates to "lose the list." Jonathan White, a deputy director of ORR, has said that Lloyd's actions during this time make him "the most prolific child abuser in American history."

Media reports have said that Lloyd was "effectively" removed from running the ORR in mid-July 2018 amid controversy over his anti-abortion actions impacting pregnant minors. In response, Lloyd characterized such reports as "not true." He added, "you can FOIA any day's worth of work and find that I remained the decision-maker until November," and that he received an "outstanding rating -- five out of five" in a performance review.

In November 2018, he took a position at the Center for Faith and Opportunity Initiatives, where he served as a senior advisor. In this role, he worked "on outreach to faith-based partners for DHHS." He departed DHHS on June 7, 2019.

In 2020, Lloyd ran for town council in Front Royal, Virginia. After being elected to the town council and serving for fifteen months, he resigned in March 2022, citing conflicts of interest.

== Personal life ==
Lloyd resides in Front Royal, Virginia with his wife and eight children.

== Selected works ==
- Lloyd, E. Scott (2018). The Undergraduate. Liberty Island. ISBN 978-1-947942-32-5.
