= Caitlin Dickerson =

American journalist

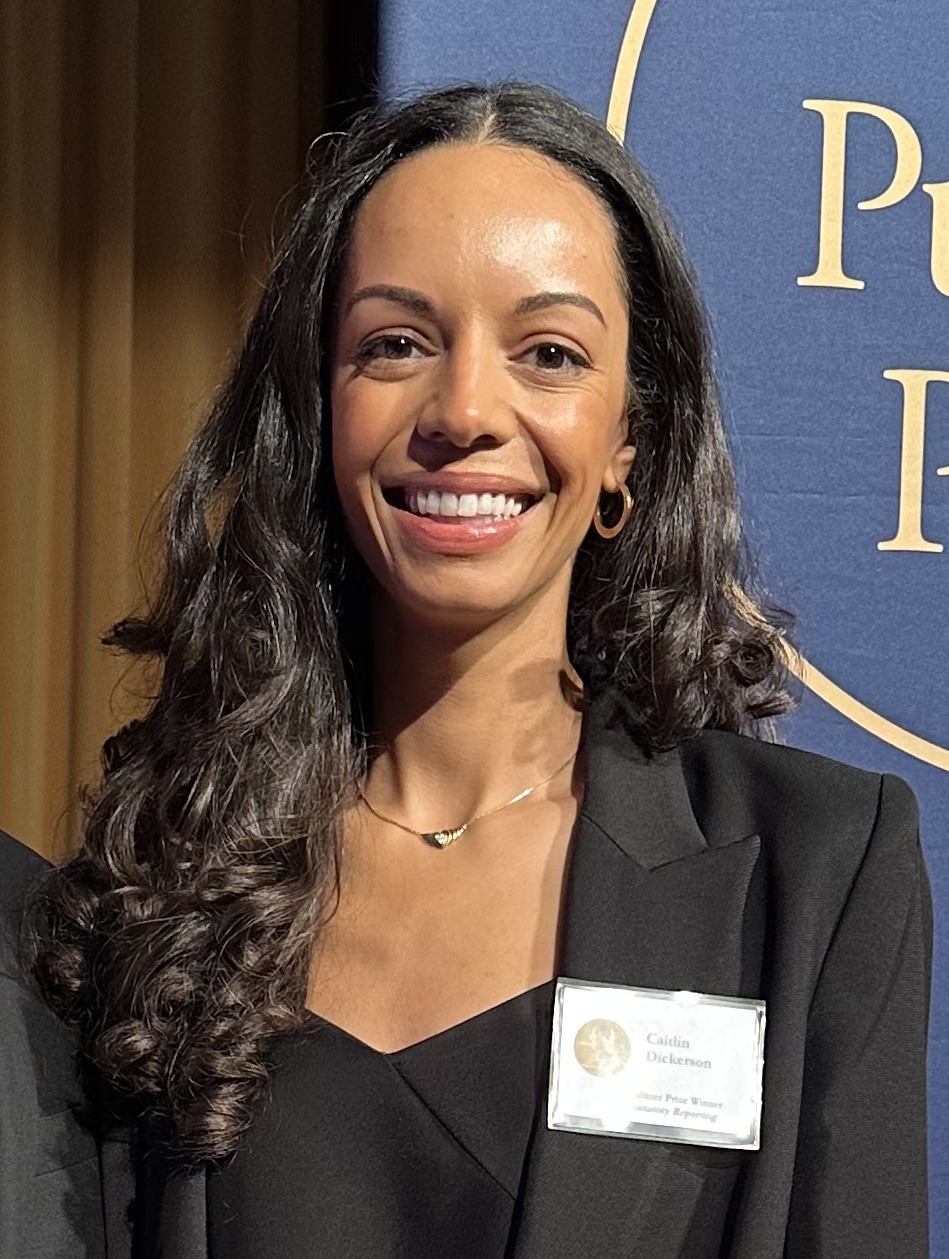
- Dickerson at the Pulitzer Prize ceremony in 2023.
- Education: California State University, Long Beach
- Occupation: Journalist
- Years active: 2011–present
- Employer: The Atlantic

Caitlin Dickerson is an American journalist. She is a reporter for The Atlantic, focused on immigration. She previously worked as a national reporter for The New York Times, a political analyst for CNN, and an investigative reporter for NPR. She was awarded a 2015 Peabody Award for an NPR special series on the testing of mustard gas on American troops in WWII. She is a 2023 winner of the Pulitzer prize.

== Career ==
Dickerson began her professional career as an intern at NPR. Following her internship, she worked at NPR as a producer, before landing a role on NPR's Investigations Desk.

In 2016, Dickerson reported on the testing of mustard gas by the U.S. military on American troops during WWII, in which subjects were grouped by race. Her reporting, published as a two-part special investigation by NPR, revealed that the Department of Veteran Affairs had broken promises it had made in the 1990s to seek out and provide compensation to veterans who had suffered permanent injuries as a result of the testing. Congress reacted to the report by calling for investigations and hearings, ultimately leading to the passage of a law to compensate test subjects. For their work, Dickerson and her investigative team were awarded a 2015 Peabody Award and a 2016 RTDNA National Edward R. Murrow Award.

In 2016, Dickerson joined the staff of The New York Times as a national immigration reporter. Dickerson broke several stories for the Times on the deportation and detention of undocumented immigrants. In June 2019 she reported on crowding and unsanitary conditions at a border station facility housing hundreds of children.

Dickerson has been a frequent guest on the news podcast The Daily and has hosted several episodes.

As of April 2021 Dickerson was a staff writer for The Atlantic magazine.

In May 2023, Dickerson won the 2023 Pulitzer Prize in Explanatory Journalism for the September 2022 Atlantic cover story, "'We Need to Take Away Children'," an examination of the Trump administration’s policy to intentionally separate migrant children from their parents. Tom Jones of Poynter called "'We Need to Take Away Children'" one of the best pieces of journalism of 2022, and described it as one of the longest-published articles in The Atlantic's history, the culmination of more than 150 interviews.

== See also ==
- New Yorkers in journalism
