= David Ellis Dickerson =

American author and radio personality

- Education: PhD in American literature, Florida State University
- Occupation: Writer
- Writing career
- Genre: Memoir

David Ellis Dickerson is an American author, humorist and contributor to National Public Radio's This American Life. Dickerson worked at Hallmark as a greeting card writer and is the unofficial Greeting Card Laureate of National Public Radio. He is creator of the web series Greeting Card Emergency, on which he writes greeting cards for unusual situations. He has also contributed to The Atlantic.

As of November 2015, he lives in Tallahassee, Florida, having moved from his native Tucson, Arizona. He also lived in New York City and Hollywood, California. He is an atheist.

== Books ==
- House of Cards: The True Story of How a 26-Year-Old Fundamentalist Virgin Learned about Life, Love, and Sex by Writing Greeting Cards, Riverhead Trade, ISBN 1594484864
- How Tolkien Sucks, Amazon Digital Services, Inc., ASIN: B009BHJGT4
- The Exy Book: Modern Myths of a Scandalous Goddess, Amazon Digital Services, Inc., ASIN: B007A2KFK6
