= John S. Dickerson =

American journalist (born 1982)

John S. Dickerson (born 1982) is a Christian pastor, author and a nationally awarded American journalist. He has written essays and opinion columns for USA Today, CNN, The New York Times Sunday Opinion Page, and the religion pages of The Washington Post.

In 2004, he joined The Scottsdale Times as a staff writer and later became features editor. While at The Scottsdale Times, his reporting earned honors from the Arizona Press Club. The Arizona Newspaper Association named him non-daily "Journalist of the Year" in 2007. He then took a staff writer position at the Phoenix New Times, an alternative weekly owned by Village Voice Media.

In 2009, he was named winner of the $10,000 Livingston Award for Young Journalists. "The Livingston Awards for excellence by professionals under the age of 35 are the largest all-media, general reporting prizes in American journalism." Charles Gibson (ABC News), Michele Norris (NPR), Tom Brokaw and Clarence Page are among the judges who selected Dickerson's investigative series about medical regulations in Arizona, "Prescription for Disaster", as the national winner for local reporting. The Association of Alternative Newsweeklies also named Dickerson national winner for investigative reporting. Three of his stories are printed in the book anthology Best AltWeekly Writing 2009 and 2010, published by Northwestern University Press. Dickerson eventually left Phoenix New Times to pastor Cornerstone Church in Prescott, Arizona.

His book The Great Evangelical Recession (Baker Publishing Group, 2013), combines his investigative journalism background with his embedded understanding of American Christianity as an insider. The book documents the decline of Christianity in the United States and suggests potential solutions for American church leaders. Ken Auletta, media critic for The New Yorker, endorsed the book: "A first rate journalist and writer, Dickerson writes with empathy, preferring to explain rather than scold. He's written an illustrious book."

In 2015 Dickerson accepted the role of teaching pastor in residence at Venture Christian Church in Los Gatos, California. The same year, HarperCollins publishers' Zondervan released his book, I Am Strong: Finding God's Peace and Strength in Life's Darkest Moments, in which he offers hope to those enduring chronic sickness or loss., On October 28, 2017, Dickerson was announced as the new lead pastor of Connection Pointe Christian Church in Brownsburg, Indiana

In October 2019 Baker Publishing Group released Dickerson's fourth book, Jesus Skeptic: A Journalist Explores the Credibility and Impact of Christianity. In Jesus Skeptic, Dickerson presents images and evidence demonstrating that "Jesus really existed and launched the greatest movement for social good in human history."
