= Laurel Creek, West Virginia =

- Unincorporated community
- Location within West Virginia Location within the United States
- Coordinates: 37°51′26″N 80°59′37″W
- Country: United States
- State: West Virginia
- County: Fayette
- Elevation: 1,742 ft (531 m)
- Time zone: UTC-5 (Eastern (EST))
  - Summer (DST): UTC-4 (EDT)
- GNIS ID: 1541399

Laurel Creek is an unincorporated community and coal town in Fayette County, West Virginia, United States.

The community takes its name from nearby Laurel Creek.
