= Mechele Dickerson =

American lawyer

- Dickerson signing her new book at the 2026 Texas Book Festival.
- Born: Mechele Dickerson; September 22, 1962 (age 64); Memphis, Tennessee, U.S.
- Education: Harvard University (BA, JD)

Mechele Dickerson (born September 22, 1962) is an American attorney, author, and university professor, She is the Arthur L. Moller Chair in Bankruptcy and Practice and University Distinguished Teaching Professor at the University of Texas School of Law.

== Early life and education ==
Dickerson was born in Memphis, Tennessee and graduated from high school in Memphis. Both of her parents were public school educators. She earned both her Bachelor of Arts and Juris Doctor degrees from Harvard University.

== Career ==
After graduating from Harvard Law School, she clerked for Judge Nathaniel R. Jones of the United States Court of Appeals for the Sixth Circuit. She practiced law in Washington, D.C. and Norfolk, Virginia before entering academia. She is an elected member of the American Law Institute and the American College of Bankruptcy.

Dickerson began her academic career at the College of William & Mary School of Law where she became the first Black female tenured professor in 2000. She joined the faculty at the University of Texas School of Law in 2006 and is the Arthur L. Moller Chair in Bankruptcy Law and Practice and a University Distinguished Teaching. Professor Dickerson holds a courtesy appointment at the LBJ School of Public Affairs and also serves as the University of Texas Faculty Athletics Representative. She served as the Associate Dean for Academic Affairs at Texas Law from 2006 to 2011.

== Books ==
Dickerson is the author of The Middle-Class New Deal: Restoring Upward Mobility and the American Dream (University of California Press, 2026), a New York Times bestseller examining the economic decline of the American middle class. The book argues that the American middle class was created through deliberate government policy during the New Deal and proposes a comprehensive set of reforms in education, labor, housing, retirement, and consumer-credit policy to restore upward mobility. Her first book, Homeownership and America's Financial Underclass: Flawed Premises, Broken Promises, New Prescriptions (Cambridge University Press, 2014) examines the failed promises of homeownership for lower- and middle-income households in this country.

== Interviews ==
- Restoring the American Middle Class One Policy at a Time (Interviewed by Jon Stewart, The Daily Show)
- What Happened to the American Middle Class and Can We Restore It? (Interviewed by Walter Isaacson, Amanpour and Company, PBS)
- Zoning Laws Are Killing the Middle Class | How to Fix It (Interviewed by John Avlon, The Bulwark)
- Does America Need A Middle Class New Deal? (Interviewed by Chuck Todd, Chuck ToddCast)
