= Homestead Temporary Shelter for Unaccompanied Children =

Migrant children's detention center in Florida, United States

Coordinates: 25.4999°N 80.3925°W

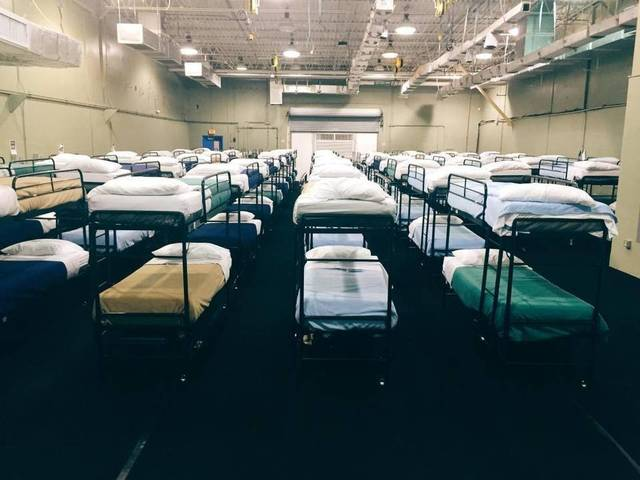
Homestead Temporary Shelter for Unaccompanied Children in 2016.

Homestead Temporary Shelter for Unaccompanied Children is a 3,200-bed migrant children's detention center in Homestead, Florida. Until August 3, 2019, the center had been operated by Comprehensive Health Services, Inc. (CHSi), which is a subsidiary of the homeland security operator Caliburn International. It was believed to be the only remaining for-profit child detention center for migrants. The organization has faced severe criticism concerning immigration. Senator Elizabeth Warren had demanded that the detention facility be "closed down", and calls for investigation and oversight grew stronger when it was revealed that the federal government had paid $33 million in just 46 days for 1,200 of the empty beds.

It was reported on February 23, 2021 that the administration of US President Joe Biden will be reopening the detention center.

== Governance ==
As of September 2019, Caliburn International, a security consulting firm, of which CHS is a subsidiary, faced criticism from south Florida media for its role, particularly because President Donald Trump's former Secretary of Homeland Security and Chief of Staff, General John Kelly, sat on the board of and worked as a lobbyist for D.C. Capital Partners (DCCP), before joining the administration in November 2017. DCCP created Caliburn in 2018. Kelly joined Caliburn's Board of Directors after leaving the White House in 2018. He was seen in April 2019 touring the facility on a golf cart. Although Caliburn, Comprehensive and DC Capital appear to have accrued financial benefits via government contracts during and subsequent to Kelly's serving as White House chief of staff, legal scholar Richard Briffault said Kelly did not necessarily break any ethics and conflict of interest rules: "It sounds like he's running between the raindrops. It doesn't sound great, but most likely he's not directly violating any policies." Briffault said government officials are prohibited from benefiting from their involvement in matters involving specific parties. That meant while he served in the White House, Kelly couldn't directly influence any contract-awarding decision to a DC Capital subsidiary. "This is classic revolving door," he continued. That employment meant Kelly couldn't lobby or attempt to influence government policy for five years, although he could return to his former company.

Caliburn's board of directors includes several other retired former flag rank military personnel including Generals Anthony Zinni and Michael Hayden and Admirals Stephen F. Loftus, Kathleen L. Martin and James G. Stavridis. Other members of the military–industrial complex on the board include scientist and bureaucrat Donald Kerr and Ambassadors Michael Corbin and decorated U.S. Navy Vietnam veteran and Reagan administration Assistant Secretary of Defense, Richard Armitage. At the end of the Vietnam war, Armitage took a central role in the evacuation of tens of thousands of refugees by sea to the Philippines. Caliburn's Chief Strategy Officer and Executive Vice President for Corporate Development is retired Vice Admiral Frank Craig Pandolfe.

== Operations ==
The Homestead Temporary Shelter was originally opened during the Obama administration, holding 8,500 juveniles while it operated between June 2016 and April 2017. It was the first in South Florida to be able to house minor immigrants to the United States. In 2017, the shelter was shut down when there was no longer a need to house unaccompanied minors, but in early 2018, the shelter was reopened "without public notice." In February 2018, CHSi won a $30 million government contract to run the shelter. The cost was a million dollars per day. It was believed that the contract had been crafted in an effort to circumvent the Flores Settlement Agreement (FSA) which had been arrived at in 1997 after over 11 years of litigation regarding the care of minor immigrants in detention.

The detention facility is surrounded by tall fencing with security checkpoints in a former Job Corps building on the Homestead Air Reserve Base. Minors in the shelter were provided with meals, snacks, medical care, recreation time and classes. The facility was operated by Comprehensive Health Services, Inc. (CHSi), used to house minors between the ages of 13 and 17. Starting in mid-April 2018, CHSi began to advertise to recruit employees to fill about 40 new positions in Homestead.

In 2019, the center became a focal point in the controversy regarding the separating of minor children of asylum seekers at the U.S. Border. On July first and second, a delegation of congressional Democrats visited the facility and raised objections to the conditions in which these minors were kept. The late Maryland Representative Elijah Cummings, who chaired the House Committee on Oversight and Reform, said, "The Trump Administration's actions at the southern border are grotesque and dehumanizing," "There seems to be open contempt for the rule of law and for basic human decency. The Committee needs to hear directly from the heads of these agencies as soon as possible in light of the almost daily reports of abuse and defiance." He invited both acting Secretary Kevin McAleenan from the Department of Homeland Security and Acting Commissioner Mark Morgan of the U.S. Customs and Border Protection at a July 12, 2019 hearing and indicated he would be prepared to subpoena top officials of President Donald Trump's administration if they refused his request to testify before the committee. "I encourage Acting Secretary McAleenan and Acting Commissioner Morgan to appear voluntarily in order to answer these critical questions," Cummings indicated that he would subpoena senior Trump officials if they declined his invitation to testify. Mississippi Representative Bennie Thompson, who chairs the House Committee on Homeland Security, joined a delegation of Democrats at the detention compound, including Democratic 2020 presidential candidates who visited it while they were in Miami for the Democratic presidential debates that were held on June 26 and 27, 2019.

On July 15, 2019, the center was visited by a congressional delegation which found the government had just rapidly reduced the number of teenagers detained there, a 42% drop in 12 days. Those legislators already intended to analyze how the facility operated and to ask for an accounting for its expenditures. A month earlier, it held 2,460 migrant children, from 13 to 17 years old, an 80% rise since it initially opened in the first quarter of 2018. On July 3, it had held 2,252 children, but by that morning, only 1,309 remained. The chairwoman of the United States House Appropriations Subcommittee on Labor, Health and Human Services, Education, and Related Agencies, Connecticut's Rosa DeLauro, wanted to know if those who had so quickly left had been paired with family members or sponsors, or just transferred to alternate shelters. Congresswoman Debbie Wasserman Schultz, who had previously been refused entry asked, "What the heck. From July 3 until July 14th, suddenly they’re able to drop 1,000 kids here when they couldn’t do that as quickly before? Where did they go?" Caliburn International did not inform them regarding possible closure but did tell them that on July 3, the shelter went on “admittance stop, so no new children have come in since then," and that DHHS began, "...releasing kids as quickly as possible." In the previous week, "448 children were released from the shelter, mostly identified as "reunifications to a sponsor," in addition to transfers to alternate facilities. There were 376 who had been reunified with family and another 70 had been transferred. Two others left because they were over 18 years old. A policy change meant that prior caregivers were no longer required to be fingerprinted. Deputy Assistant Secretary for public affairs at the DHHS, Mark Weber, described Homestead as "an emergency influx shelter for use when the standard shelter system is near capacity," and space had become available at standard shelters. Miami Congresswoman Debbie Mucarsel-Powell, who had inquired about hurricane planning, said that the lack of such an emergency policy was an "extremely dangerous form of neglect." A Caliburn representative said the facility wasn't accepting new placements and was “not sure for how long” the no-admissions policy would remain. While most of the minors in the Homestead shelter crossed the border unaccompanied, in June 2018, 94 of the roughly 1,000 children in the center at that time had been separated from their parents at the border under the Trump administration family separation policy. Protesters, which included members of the American Friends Service Committee (AFSC) gathered 128,000 signatures from opponents of the facility. On June 22, 2018, government officials were allowed to tour the facilities which had 782 boys and 387 girls on the premises. On average, minors remain in the shelter for around 25 days before they are placed in homes of family or friends who live in the U.S. This is despite current immigration laws that limit detention to only 20 days. Despite being contractually obligated to close on April 20, 2019, the facility remained open holding children until August, 2019. The facility had been opened and closed during the Obama administration and reopened in 2018, and was emptied by August 3, 2019. Its contract was canceled as of November 30, 2019, after being vacant for almost four months.

== Criticism ==
Protesters opposing the Trump administration family separation policy demonstrated in front of the Homestead shelter on June 20, 2018. The previous day, Democratic politicians including, state Representative Kionne McGhee, then-Senator Bill Nelson and Congresswoman Debbie Wasserman Schultz, were denied entry to the shelter. This led to protesters accusing the Trump administration of trying to cover up mistreatment. Senator Marco Rubio was allowed to visit Homestead on June 22, though he did not describe what he saw. In April, 2019, Wasserman Schultz, plus newly elected Congresswomen Debbie Mucarsel-Powell, and Donna Shalala, all representing parts of Miami-Dade County, were refused entry into the facility by the Department of Health and Human Services (DHHS), despite their having the legal authority to demand entry. Shalala headed DHHS for eight years during the Clinton administration. Congressman Charlie Crist, Florida's former governor, termed the situation, "...indefensible. Stunning and disappointing, to say the least." George Sheldon, a former secretary of the Florida Department of Children & Families, characterized the policy as "obscene." "There's no word I can use to describe what I think is an extremely inhumane policy."

A protest campaign by local churches, synagogues, and other religious groups has been ongoing since February 20, 2019. Nearly 100 protesters gathered there on April 19, 2019.

The conditions in which the children were being held were widely criticized including for being regimented and austere. A whistleblower, Andrew Lorentzen-Strait, quit his Immigration and Customs Enforcement job after 18 years to work in for the private non-profit Lutheran Immigration and Refugee Services. He said, "They say we are the children people, you are the enforcement people, but that is blurred now." "These aren't commodities. They're kids, and they don't need to have big box stores serving them." "You can't just order up migrant care." In February 2019, reporters on a tour of the facility were informed that older children preferred the huge dormitory holding hundreds of beds, a program manager telling them, "They say it's like a slumber party."

In Topeka, Kansas, Washburn University law professor David Rubenstein, whose research is focused on privatized immigrant detention said, "The profiteering incentive comes at the cost of cutting programs or rights or treatment or conditions."

Two former employees have filed lawsuits claiming they weren't properly trained or paid properly for their work at the shelter. They say that they were hired as travel chaperones but were asked to perform other duties. They claim that their work hours were reduced and then they were fired after complaining about their situation.

At a September 18, 2019 hearing of the U.S. House Appropriations Subcommittee on Health and Human Services, et al., in response to a question posed by Representative Mark Pocan, Jonathan Hayes, the acting director of the Office of Refugee Resettlement said the Department of Health and Human Services had spent more than $33 million in 46 days to keep the vacant Homestead center in operation although no children were currently housed there. The empty shelter cost taxpayers $720,000 a day: $600 a day for each of 1,200 empty beds at the military base facility. When children are actually present, the cost rises to $750 (~$905.00 in 2024) daily, per child. Pocan later told Newsweek that he felt the explanation Hayes provided was insufficient, and the price being paid would be more than the cost of a "night in the Four Seasons or a Trump hotel." "It's a shocking amount of money to be paying for an empty facility." In July 2018, one detainee, a 15-year-old girl from Honduras, escaped from facility workers and was found hiding in a nearby mechanic's shop. Police located her and returned her to the facility. Reports about the incident referred to the facility as a "child prison."

In February 2020, Eyal Weizman, Director of Forensic Architecture, was denied entry to the US after being classified as a “security threat” by a Homeland Security algorithm. He had been planning to help launch an investigation into Homestead by teaching local groups Forensic Architecture's research methods into alleged abuses.

=== Facility shortcomings ===
A Stanford University expert in child trauma, Ryan Matlow, expressed concerns that size of the Homestead facility was inappropriate, that it was much too large to address the individual needs of children and that the depersonalization of detainees could produce long term physical and emotional effects, including heart problems and depression. The corporation's plans for additional facilities holding up to 500 children would still be expected to produce such effects.

The shelter property abuts a military Superfund site. It is surrounded by soil and groundwater contaminated with dangerous metal and chemicals which include arsenic and lead, and adjacent land was utilized for hazardous waste, munitions, and pesticide storage. Contaminants at such sites can cause a variety of health problems, including being carcinogenic, causing renal failure and developmental damage. Because of chemical contamination, residential development on land surrounding the shelter site is forbidden. An inquiry by the Miami Herald did not disclose any evidence that the shelter site was tested for such contaminants or if it had been evaluated as to their impact on children held there. There was an additional problem regarding exposure to high levels of noise at the center as it is proximate to operations of the Homestead Air Reserve Base's F-16C fighter jets. The center was found to be in a noise zone that according to the United States Air Force (USAF), the Federal Aviation Administration (FAA) and the Department of Housing and Urban Development (HUD), is "normally unacceptable" for any human residence. According to the World Health Organization (WHO), such a level of sustained noise exposure can be damaging to the cognition and development of children.

=== Allegations of staff criminality ===
A government watchdog agency, the Office of Inspector General (OIG) for the DHHS, looked into allegations of sex abuse and extortion in the Homestead shelter. A female worker was charged with attempted coercion and enticement of a recently released minor to engage in illicit sexual activity and attempted production of child pornography. She was sentenced to ten years in prison. Questions were raised about background screening. One felon recently hired as a lead worker, had a drug conviction and was currently in drug court when he became employed.

=== Contractor favoritism ===
In December 2016, Comprehensive Health Services (CHSi) announced a new project that would "create 150 new jobs" at its Cape Canaveral headquarters. Consequently, in July 2017, the state awarded it a $600,000 (~$752,880 in 2024) "qualified target-industry" tax-incentive package. As then-Governor, now-U.S. Senator Rick Scott negotiated that tax break, Comprehensive Health concluded a deal to pay a $3.8 million settlement to the U.S. Department of Justice to settle a medical-fraud claim. The corporation paid the fine in February 2017, without admitting guilt, but the state of Florida still issued the tax breaks. Despite an absence of competitive bidding, in late April 2019, CHSi was granted a new contract worth at least $341 million, but which could increase substantially if the population of children continued to rise. A joint investigation by the Associated Press and the PBS investigative journalism flagship feature, Frontline, found that although the shelter had been completely empty for two months, it still had 2,000 staff on hand. There had been concerted initiatives on the part of the Trump administration to shift detained children from non-profit, often religious denomination-operated shelters, to Caliburn and other for-profit prison operators, such as the GEO Group. Trump's Health and Human Services Secretary, a long time Republican executive and judicial branch insider, Alex Azar, called the findings of the investigators "misleading," but avoided addressing the shifting to for-profit privatization providers, which were exclusive to Caliburn at the time. Six other Comprehensive Health Services programs in Texas that were holding migrant children were booming, including those in San Benito, Brownsville, and Los Fresnos. In early June, CHSi had been holding almost 25% of all the migrant children who were in custody at that time. The corporation had received almost $300 million in 2019 when the story was written.
