= Kathleen L. Martin =

Deputy surgeon general of the U.S. Navy

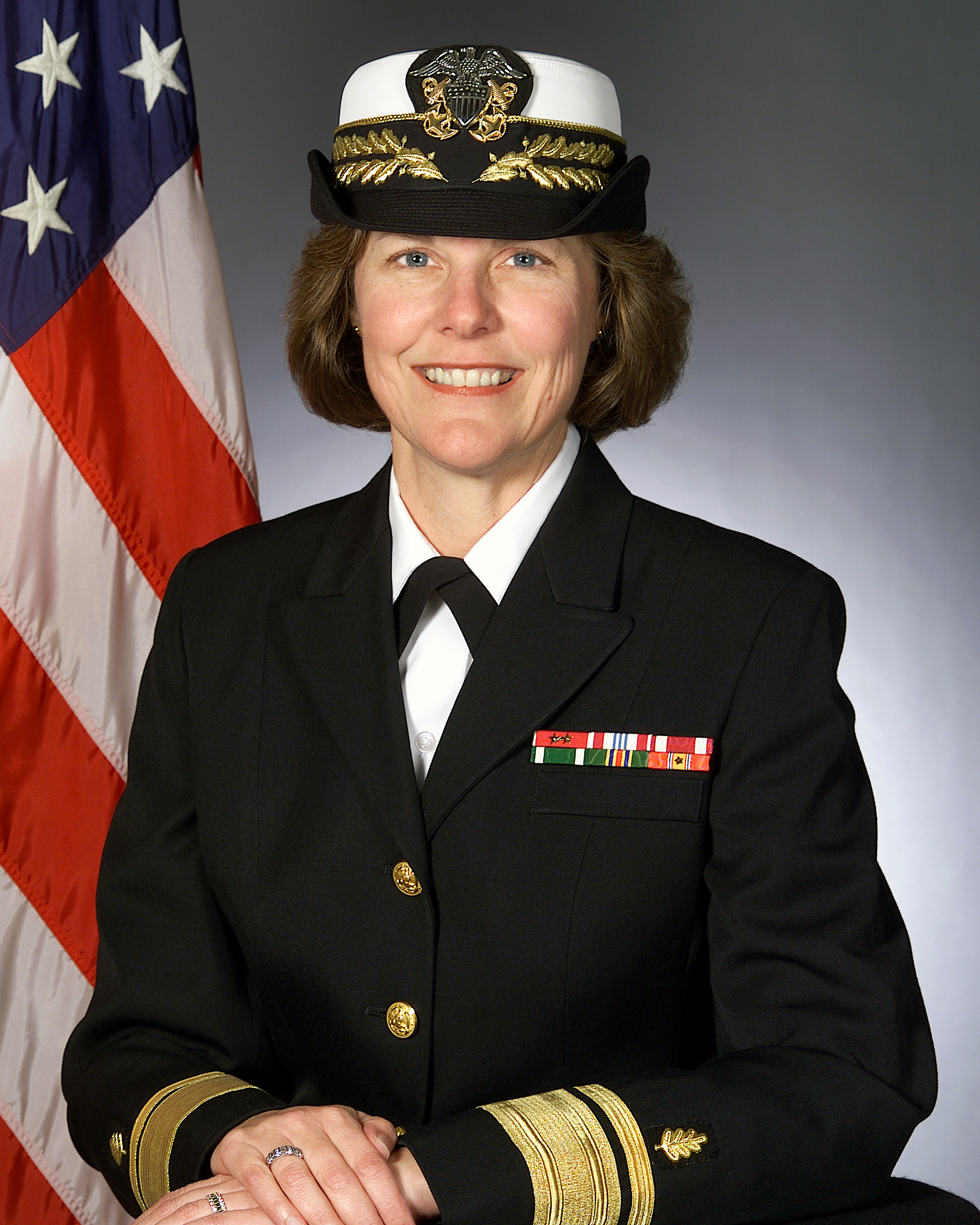
- RADM Kathleen L. Martin, USN
- Born: May 2, 1951 (age 75); Arnold, Pennsylvania, U.S.
- Military career
- Allegiance: United States of America
- Branch: United States Navy
- Service years: 1973–2005
- Rank: Rear Admiral (Upper Half)
- Commands: 19th Director of the United States Navy Nurse Corps; Naval Medical Education and Training Command, Bethesda, Maryland
- Awards: Navy Distinguished Service Medal (2); Legion of Merit (3); Defense Meritorious Service Medal; Meritorious Service Medal; Navy Commendation Medal
- Other work: CEO Vinson Hall Corporation, Executive Director, Navy Marine Coast Guard Residence Foundation

Rear Admiral Kathleen Lousche Martin (born January 14, 1951) served as Deputy Surgeon General of the Navy/Vice Chief, Bureau of Medicine and Surgery from October 2002 until her retirement in September 2005. She also held the position as the 19th Director of the Navy Nurse Corps from August 1998 to August 2001. She serves on the board of directors for Caliburn International, a military contracting conglomerate that also oversees operations of Homestead Temporary Shelter for Unaccompanied Children.

== Navy Nurse Corps career ==
A native of Arnold, Pennsylvania., Martin was commissioned an Ensign in May 1973 after graduating from Boston University. Following Officer Indoctrination School in Newport, R.I., she served at Naval Hospital, Camp Lejeune, North Carolina, as a staff nurse and later as a charge nurse in pediatrics. In 1976, she reported to Navy Recruiting District, Philadelphia, as the Medical Programs Officer.

From 1979 to 1982, Martin was assigned to Naval Hospital, Jacksonville, Florida, as the charge nurse of the pediatric ward. Following this tour of duty, she was assigned to Naval Medical Clinic, Pearl Harbor, Hawaii. During this period her duties included Division Officer of Military Medicine, Credentials Coordinator, Risk Manager, and Quality Assurance Coordinator.

In 1986, she was transferred to Naval Hospital, San Diego, California and served as head of the Ambulatory Medical Nursing Department, which encompassed eight medical specialty clinics. Rear Adm. Martin attended the University of San Diego from 1990 to 1992. Following duty under instruction, she was assigned to Naval Medical Clinic, Port Hueneme, California, as the director of nursing services.

Martin assumed her first command in 1993 as commanding officer of Naval Medical Clinic, Port Hueneme. Subsequently, she served as commanding officer, Naval Hospital, Charleston, S.C., from July 1995 to June 1998. She was promoted to the rank of rear admiral and assigned as the medical inspector general from August 1998 to October 1999. From November 1999 to October 2002, she served as commander of National Naval Medical Center. She also held the position as the 19th director of the Navy Nurse Corps from August 1998 to August 2001.

== Education ==
Martin graduated from Boston University School of Nursing in 1973. She attended the University of San Diego from 1990 to 1992, earning a Master of Science degree in both nursing administration and as a family health nurse specialist.

== Awards ==
Military decorations include the Distinguished Service Medal (two awards), Legion of Merit (three awards), the Defense Meritorious Service Medal, Meritorious Service Medal and the Navy Commendation Medal. She is a member of the American Society for Public Administration, the Association of Military Surgeons of the United States and Sigma Theta Tau.

- Navy Distinguished Service Medal with Gold Star
- Legion of Merit with two Gold Stars
- Defense Meritorious Service Medal
- Meritorious Service Medal
- Navy Commendation Medal

== See also ==
- Navy Nurse Corps
- Women in the United States Navy

Military offices
Preceded by Joan Marie Engel	Director, Navy Nurse Corps; 1998–2001	Succeeded by Nancy J. Lescavage
