= Anthony Zinni =

American Marine Corps general

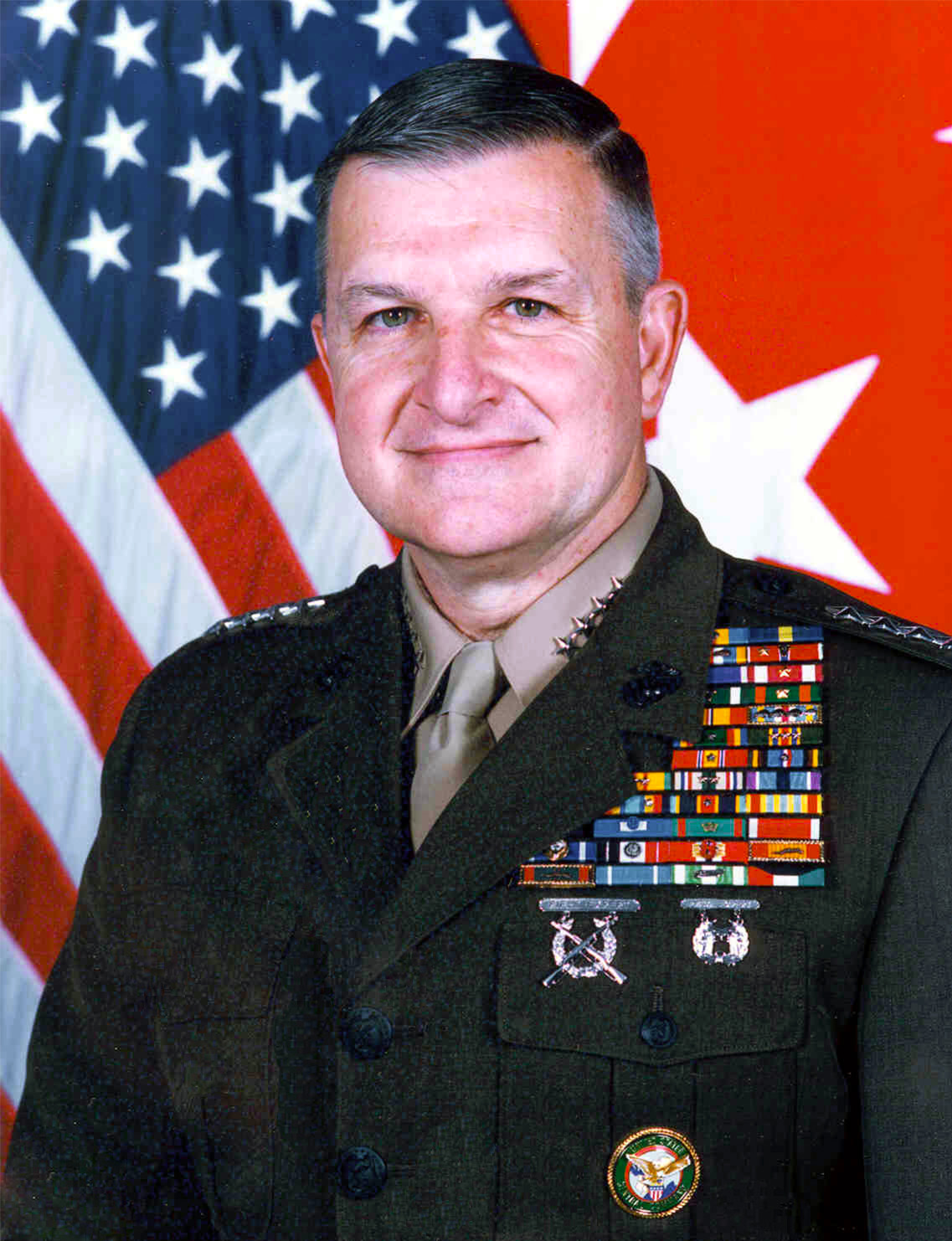

United States Special Envoy for Qatar
- In office August 2017 – January 2019
- President: Donald Trump

United States Special Envoy for Middle East Peace
- In office November 27, 2001 – March 13, 2003
- President: George W. Bush
- Preceded by: Dennis Ross
- Succeeded by: George Mitchell (2009)

Personal details
- Born: Anthony Charles Zinni; September 17, 1943 (age 83) Bryn Mawr, Pennsylvania, U.S.
- Party: Democratic (Formerly); Republican (Formerly); Independent (Currently)
- Education: Villanova University (BS); Salve Regina University (MA); Central Michigan University (MA)
- Nickname: "The Godfather"

Military service
- Allegiance: United States
- Branch/service: United States Marine Corps
- Years of service: 1965–2000
- Rank: General
- Commands: United States Central Command; I Marine Expeditionary Force; 9th Marine Regiment; 2nd Battalion, 8th Marines
- Battles/wars: Vietnam War; Unified Task Force
- Awards: Defense Distinguished Service Medal (2); Navy Distinguished Service Medal; Defense Superior Service Medal; Bronze Star Medal (2); Purple Heart

Anthony Charles Zinni (born September 17, 1943) is a retired United States Marine Corps general and a former Commander in Chief of the United States Central Command (CENTCOM). From 2001 to 2003, he served as a special envoy for the United States to Israel and the Palestinian Authority. From 2017 to 2019, he served as a special envoy to help resolve the Qatar diplomatic crisis.

While serving as a special envoy, Zinni was also an instructor in the Department of International Studies at the Virginia Military Institute. He later served as an instructor at the Sanford School of Public Policy at Duke University, a public speaker, and an author of best-selling books on his military career and foreign affairs, including Battle for Peace. As of 2005, he was involved in the corporate world, joining M.I.C. Industries as its president for International Operations in 2005.

Zinni also serves or has served on the advisory boards of a number of companies, including the security testing firm, Mu Dynamics, based in Sunnyvale, California. He joined Duke University's Terry Sanford Institute of Public Policy in spring 2008 as the Sanford Distinguished Lecturer in Residence and taught a new course in the Hart Leadership Program. Zinni also serves on the board of directors for Caliburn International, a military contracting conglomerate that includes operations for Homestead Temporary Shelter for Unaccompanied Children.

He has been credited for foresight in predicting the dangers of terrorism coming out of Afghanistan before the September 11 attacks of 2001, and for supporting the Iraq War troop surge of 2007. In October 2009, he came out firmly in support of General Stanley A. McChrystal's request for up to 40,000 additional troops in Afghanistan.

== Early life and education ==
Zinni was born in Bryn Mawr, Pennsylvania and raised in Conshohocken, Pennsylvania, the son of Lilla (née Disabatino), a seamstress and homemaker, and Antonio Zinni, a chauffeur. His parents were of Italian descent. His father was drafted into the U.S. Army shortly after immigrating and served in World War I, being promoted to corporal and later receiving citizenship. Zinni's brother served in the Korean War.

In 1965, Zinni graduated from Villanova University with a B.S. degree in economics and was commissioned a second lieutenant in the United States Marine Corps. He later earned an M.A. degree in management and supervision from Central Michigan University in 1984 and a second M.A. degree in international relations from Salve Regina College in 1987. Zinni graduated from the Marine Corps Command and Staff College in 1978 and the National War College in 1984. He attended the John F. Kennedy Special Warfare Center and School in 1967 and the Amphibious Warfare School in 1970. In 2023, Zinni was awarded an honorary degree from Salve Regina University.

== Career ==
=== U.S. Marine Corps ===
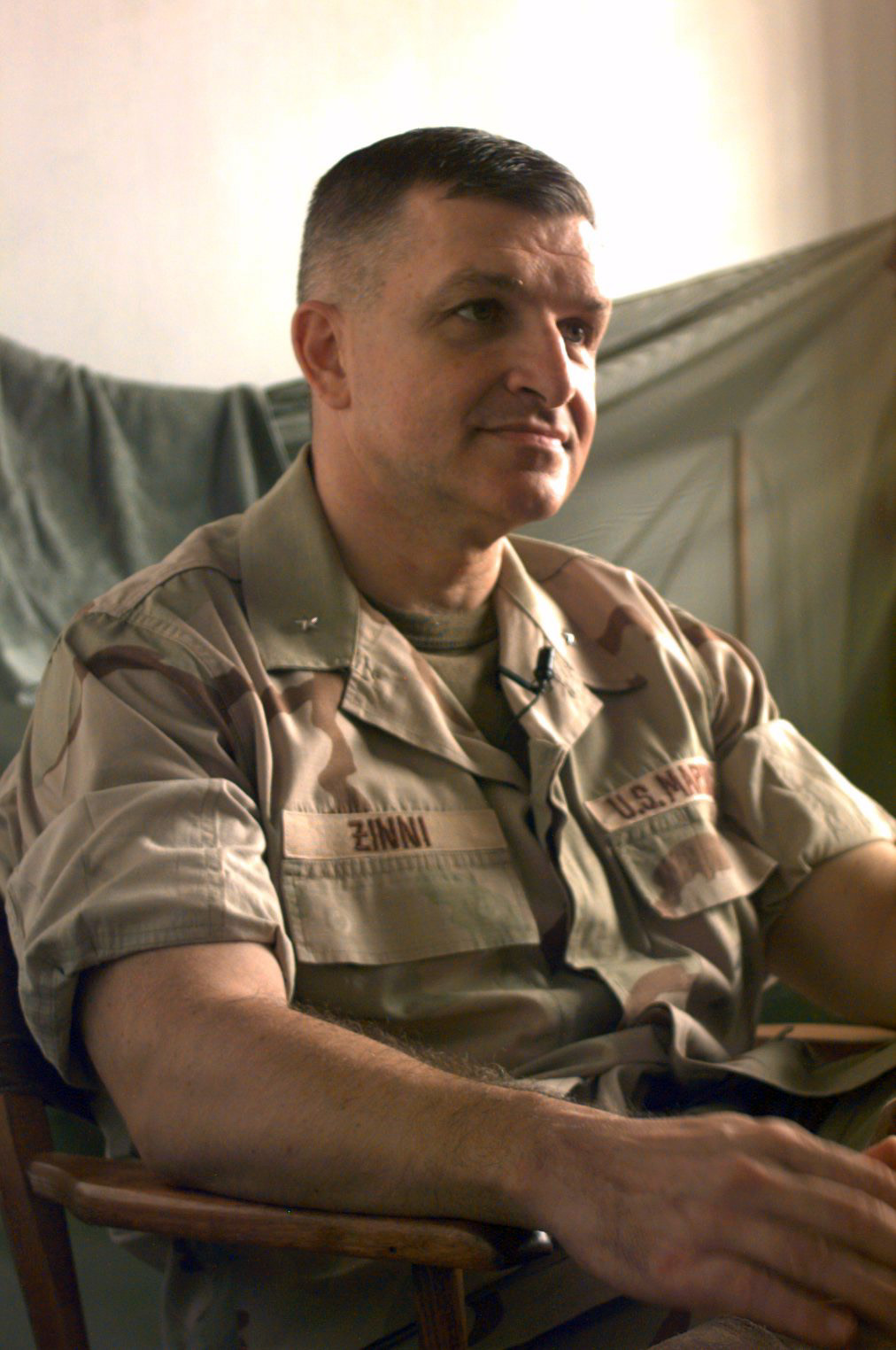
Zinni in Somalia, January 1993.

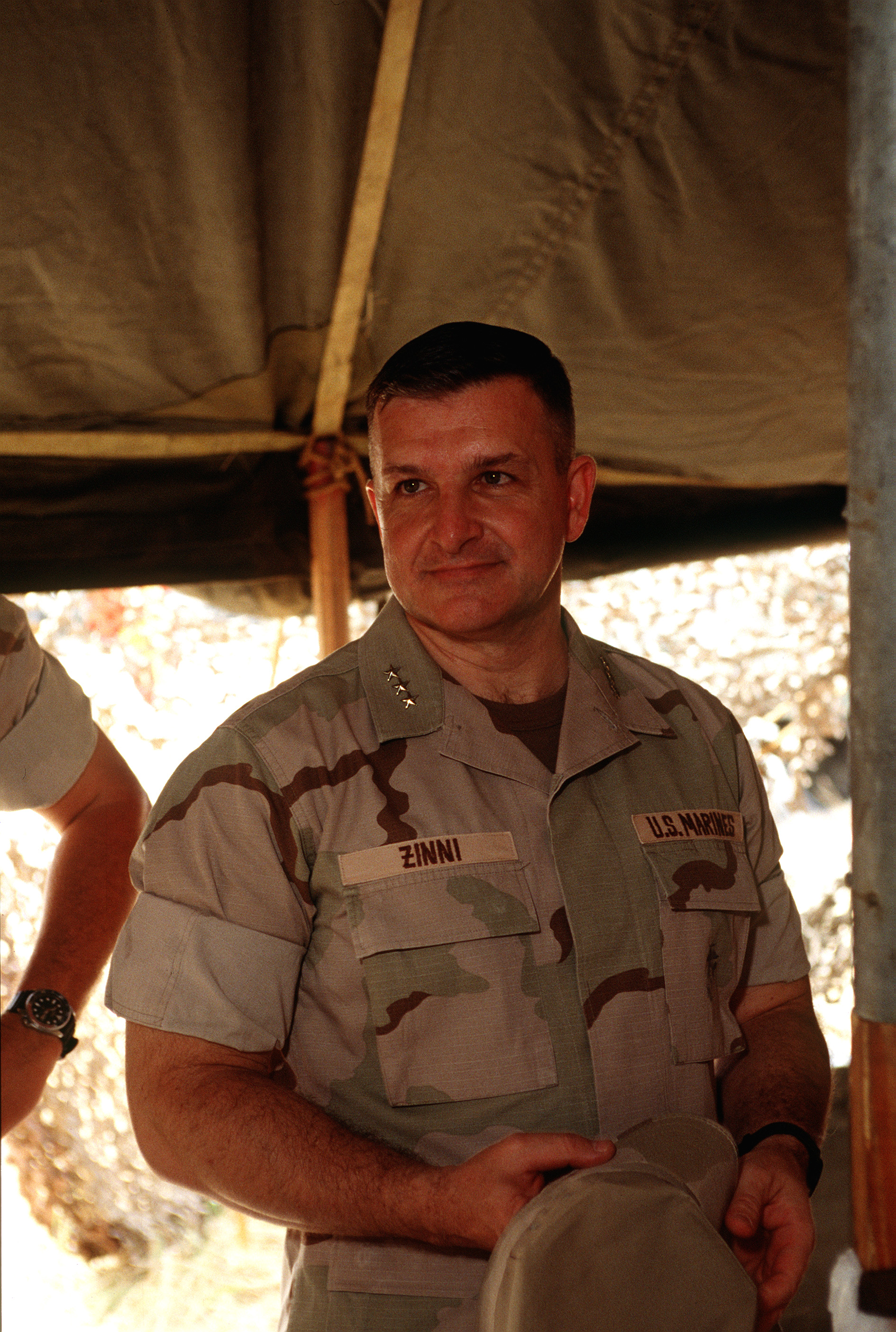
Zinni in February 1995.

After completion of the Basic School in 1965, Zinni was assigned to the 2nd Marine Division, where he served as a platoon commander, company executive officer, and company commander in the 1st Battalion, 6th Marines. He also served as a company commander in the 1st Infantry Training Regiment during this tour. In 1967, Zinni was assigned as an infantry battalion advisor to the Vietnamese Marine Corps. Following his service in the Vietnam War, he was ordered to the Basic School where he served as a tactics instructor, platoon commander, and company executive officer. In 1970, he returned to Vietnam as a company commander in 1st Battalion, 5th Marines where he was wounded, evacuated, and subsequently assigned to the 3rd Force Service Support Group on Okinawa. There he served as a company commander and guard officer. In 1971, Zinni returned to the 2nd Marine Division, where he served as a company commander in the 1st Battalion, 8th Marines, Aide de Camp to the Commanding General, and Officer in Charge of the Infantry Training Center. In 1974, he was assigned to Headquarters Marine Corps, where he was assigned as the Retention and Release Officer and Plans Officer in the Officer Assignment Branch of the Manpower Department.

Zinni again served in the 2nd Marine Division in 1978, as the Operations Officer of the 3rd Battalion, 2nd Marines, Executive Officer of the 1st Battalion, 8th Marines, Executive Officer of the 8th Marine Regiment and Commanding Officer of the 2nd Battalion, 8th Marines. In 1981, he was assigned as an operations and tactics instructor at the Marine Corps Command and Staff College at Quantico, Virginia. He was next assigned to the Operations Division at Headquarters, U.S. Marine Corps where he served as the Head of the Special Operations and Terrorism Counteraction Section and as the Head, Marine Air-Ground Task Force Concepts and Capabilities Branch. In 1984, he earned his master's degree from Central Michigan University. In 1986, he was selected as a fellow on the Chief of Naval Operations Strategic Studies Group. From 1987 to 1989, Zinni served on Okinawa as the regimental commander of the 9th Marine Regiment and the Commanding Officer of the 35th Marine Expeditionary Unit, which was twice deployed to the Philippines to conduct emergency security operations and disaster relief operations. Upon his return to the U.S., he was assigned as the Chief of Staff of the Marine Air-Ground Training and Education Center at Marine Corps Base Quantico.

His initial general officer assignment was as the Deputy Director of Operations at the U.S. European Command. In 1991, he served as the Chief of Staff and Deputy Commanding General of Combined Task Force Operation Provide Comfort during the Kurdish relief effort in Turkey and Iraq. He also served as the Military Coordinator for Operation Provide Hope, the relief effort for the former Soviet Union. In 1992–93, he served as the Director for Operations for the Unified Task Force in Somalia for Operation Restore Hope. Also in 1993, he served as the Assistant to the U.S. Special Envoy to Somalia during Operation Continue Hope/UNOSOM II. Zinni was assigned as the Deputy Commanding General, U.S. Marine Corps Combat Development Command, Quantico, Virginia, from 1992 to 1994.

From 1994 to 1996, he served as the Commanding General, 1st Marine Expeditionary Force. During early 1995, Zinni served as Commander of the Combined Task Force for Operation United Shield, protecting the withdrawal of U.N. forces from Somalia.

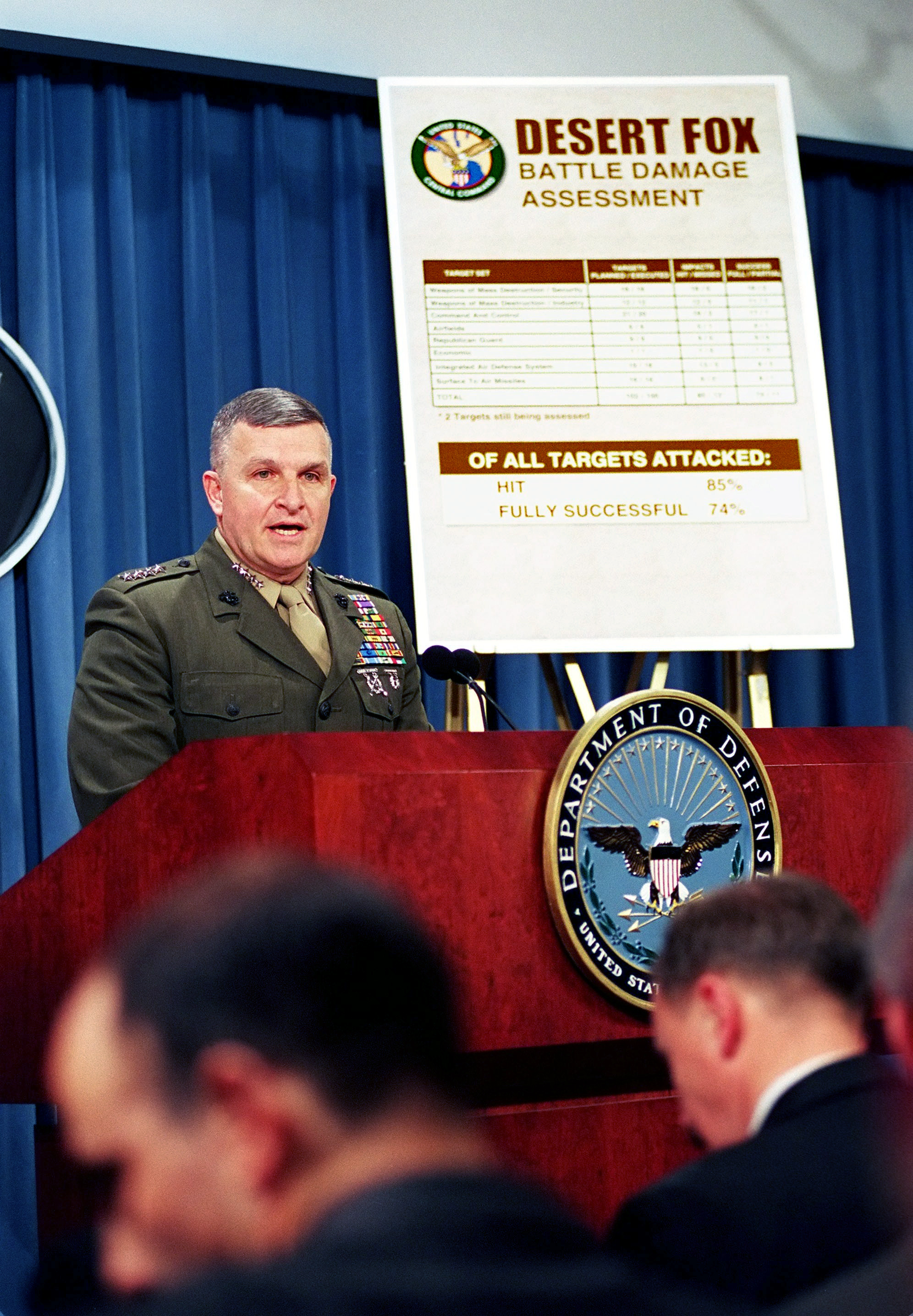
Zinni briefs reporters as to the results of Operation Desert Fox in December 1998.

From September 1996 until August 1997, Zinni served as the Deputy Commander in Chief, United States Central Command. His final tour was from August 1997 to September 2000 as the Commander in Chief, United States Central Command, MacDill Air Force Base, Florida. He organized Operation Desert Fox, a series of airstrikes against Iraq during December 1998, with the stated purpose of degrading Iraq's weapons of mass destruction program. As CinCCENT, he and General Wesley Clark, CINCEUR, held a mini-summit between their commands to determine policies over Africa. Clark was reluctant to support Zinni's activist attempts to engage more in Africa. Following his command of CENTCOM, he retired in autumn 2000.

=== Testimony before Congress ===
On March 15, 2000, Zinni testified before Congress:

Iraq remains the most significant near-term threat to U.S. interests in the Persian Gulf region. This is primarily due to its large conventional military force, the pursuit of WMD, oppressive treatment of Iraqi citizens, refusal to comply with United Nations Security Council resolutions (UNSCR), persistent threats to the enforcement of the no-fly zones (NFZ), and continued efforts to violate UN Security Council sanctions through oil smuggling. While Iraq's WMD capabilities were degraded under UN supervision and set back by Coalition strikes, some capabilities remain and others could quickly be regenerated. Despite claims that WMD efforts have ceased, Iraq probably is continuing clandestine nuclear research, retains stocks of chemical and biological munitions, and is concealing extended-range SCUD missiles, possibly equipped with CBW payloads. Even if Baghdad reversed its course and surrendered all WMD capabilities, it retains the scientific, technical, and industrial infrastructure to replace agents and munitions within weeks or months. A special concern is the absence of a UN inspection and monitoring presence, which until December 1998 had been paramount to preventing a large-scale resumption of prohibited weapons programs. A new disarmament regime must be reintroduced into Iraq as soon as possible and allowed to carry out the mandates dictated by the post-Gulf War UN resolutions.

Zinni also warned about terrorism:

Extremists like Osama bin Laden and his World Islamic Front network benefit from the global nature of communications that permits recruitment, fundraising, and direct connections to sub-elements worldwide ... Terrorists are seeking more lethal weaponry to include: chemical, biological, radiological, and even nuclear components with which to perpetrate more sensational attacks ... Three [Iraq, Iran, & Sudan ] of the seven recognized state-sponsors of terrorism are within this potentially volatile area, and the Taliban regime in Afghanistan has been sanctioned by the UN Security Council for its harboring of Osama bin Laden. Nearly one-half of the 28 recognized terrorist organizations have operational sites within the region. Afghanistan has emerged as a catalyst for regional instability offering sanctuary, support, and training facilities to a growing number of extremist elements.

=== Special envoy ===
From 2001 to 2003, Zinni served as a special envoy for the U.S. to Israel and the Palestinian Authority.

In August 2017, he traveled to the Persian Gulf at the request of United States Secretary of State Rex Tillerson to help mediate the Qatar diplomatic crisis. Zinni resigned from his position as an envoy in January 2019, for he thought he could not resolve the dispute.

== CNA Military Advisory Board ==
Gen. Zinni served on the CNA Military Advisory Board,[8] the first group of retired generals and admirals to examine the national security implications of climate change. Founded in 2006 by Sherri Goodman, the CNA Military Advisory board brought together military leaders from the United States Army, Navy, Air Force, and Marine Corps. The landmark report of the CNA Military Advisory Board, National Security and the Threat of Climate Change, established the concept of climate change as a “threat multiplier.” In the 2007 report, General Zinni referenced the inevitability of climate change and the need to take action now. General Zinni was one of the first leaders to appreciate the link between climate change, migration, terrorism, and instability. He wanted to “look at how climate change effects could drive populations to migrate. . . . What kinds of conflicts might result from their migration? You may also have a population that is traumatized by an event or change in condition triggered by climate change... It’s not hard to make the connection between climate change and instability and climate change and terrorism.”

== Personal life ==
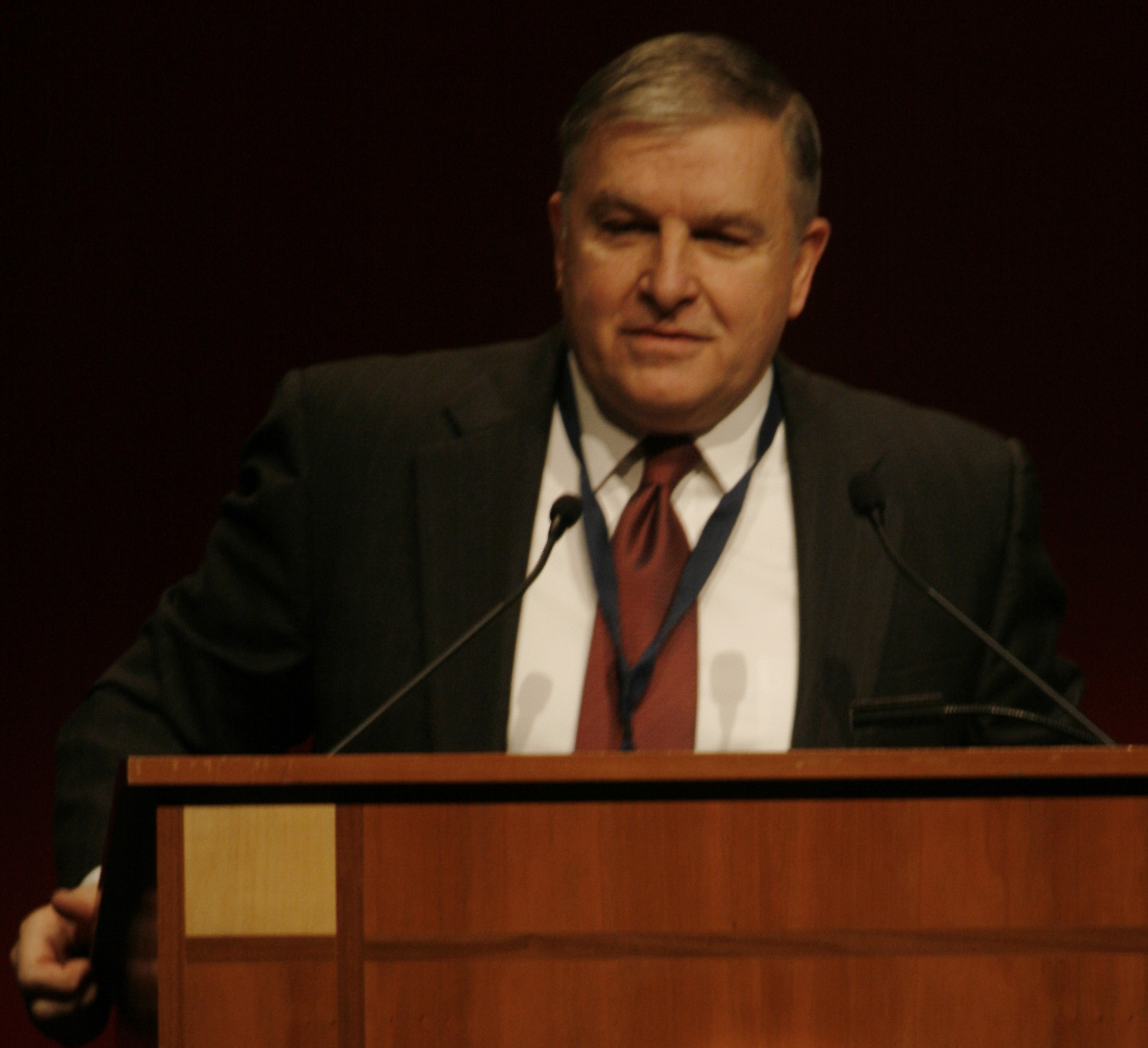
Zinni orating in January 2009

Zinni's son, Anthony Zinni, serves in the Marine Corps and was promoted to the rank of major effective September 1, 2010.

Zinni holds positions on several boards of directors of major U.S. corporations. In addition, he has held academic positions that include the Stanley Chair in Ethics at the Virginia Military Institute, the Nimitz Chair at the University of California, Berkeley, the Hofheimer Chair at the Joint Forces Staff College, and the Harriman Professorship of Government and membership on the board of the Reves Center for International Studies at the College of William and Mary. He has worked as Chairman of the Board of the Middle East Institute, with the University of California's Institute on Global Conflict and Cooperation and the Henry Dunant Centre for humanitarian dialogue in Geneva. He is also a Distinguished Advisor at the Center for Strategic and International Studies and a member of the Council on Foreign Relations. He was the Executive Vice President for Dyncorp International from July 18, 2007, to the end of 2008. He served on the Board of Directors of DynCorp International prior to that position.

He serves or has served on the board of trustees of the National Constitution Center in Philadelphia, which is a museum dedicated to the U.S. Constitution.

As of 2014, he serves as chairman of the board of governors of the Middle East Institute. He has been named honorary chairman of that institution. Zinni also serves as an honorary board member of the non-profit Wine Country Marines – a 501(c)3 dedicated to helping wounded service members, and aiding the welfare of currently serving service members, as well as addressing veterans employment and transition and healthcare.

In April 2004, Zinni gave a lecture entitled "From the Battlefield to the Negotiating Table: Preventing Deadly Conflict" at the University of San Diego's Joan B. Kroc Institute for Peace & Justice Distinguished Lecture Series.

In 2004, Zinni was named in an investigative report by Diana B. Henriques of The New York Times as being among the "retired or former military people" recruited to the corporate boards and sales forces of investment firms engaged in deceptive marketing of financial instruments aimed at military veterans in order to lend them credibility. The investment firm that had recruited Zinni, First Command Financial Planning, Inc., responded in written comments to a subsequent United States House of Representatives investigation that "It would be unfortunate if anyone inferred that these honorable individuals would take any action or support any organization that did not act in the best interests of service members." The U.S. Securities and Exchange Commission (SEC) and National Association of Securities Dealers (NASD) subsequently concluded that First Command "willfully violated the Securities Act of 1933 Section 17(a)(2) dealing with inter-state fraud." In particular, the SEC concluded that First Command had sold mutual fund investments to veterans termed "systematic plans" which had very high sales charges termed "front-end sales loads", "by, in part, making misleading statements and omissions concerning, among other things: (a) comparisons between the systematic plan and other mutual fund investments; (b) the availability of the Thrift Savings Plan ("TSP"), which offers military investors many of the features of a systematic plan at lower costs; and (c) the efficacy of the front-end sales load in ensuring that investors remain committed to the systematic plan." In December 2004, First Command entered into a $12 million settlement with the SEC and NASD without admitting guilt.

In 2006, Zinni argued that more troops were needed in Iraq in the context of preventing the then-budding civil war.

In 2007, he worked on a report entitled "National Security and the Threat of Climate Change" with 11 other retired military commanders. The report stated that global warming would act as a threat multiplier to global conflict.

General Zinni is also a "Distinguished Military Fellow" for the Center for Defense Information, a part of the World Security Institute.

In 2009, Zinni reported that he had been offered and accepted the post of United States Ambassador to Iraq for the Barack Obama administration, but that the appointment had been subsequently withdrawn without explanation. The administration's final choice for the ambassadorship was Christopher R. Hill.

On June 26, 2009, General Anthony (Tony) Zinni (USMC ret.), then a member of the BAE Systems, Inc. Board, has been appointed Chairman of the BAE Systems, Inc. Board and, pending appointment of a permanent successor to Walt Havenstein, Acting President and CEO of BAE Systems, Inc. Tony will also join the BAE Systems Executive Committee in his capacity as Acting President and CEO of BAE Systems, Inc.

General Zinni also serves or has served on the board of Kaseman which has teamed up with Blackwater to pursue security work for the State Department.

Since 2011, Anthony Zinni is a member of the board of the Peace Research Endowment.

=== Political involvement ===
Efforts to get him to run for the U.S. Senate have gone nowhere. Zinni has said he would never run for office. He says his decision to endorse President George W. Bush in 2000 was a mistake, and in 2003, indicated that he plans to avoid politics in the future. However, on March 3, 2006, Zinni joined fellow former United States Marines General Joseph P. Hoar, Lt. General Greg Newbold, Lt. General Frank Petersen, and Congressman Jack Murtha in endorsing fellow former U.S. Marine and Secretary of the Navy Jim Webb for U.S. Senate in Virginia. Zinni had been floated as a possible vice presidential running mate of Barack Obama, in 2008.

== Awards and decorations ==
Zinni's decorations include the following:

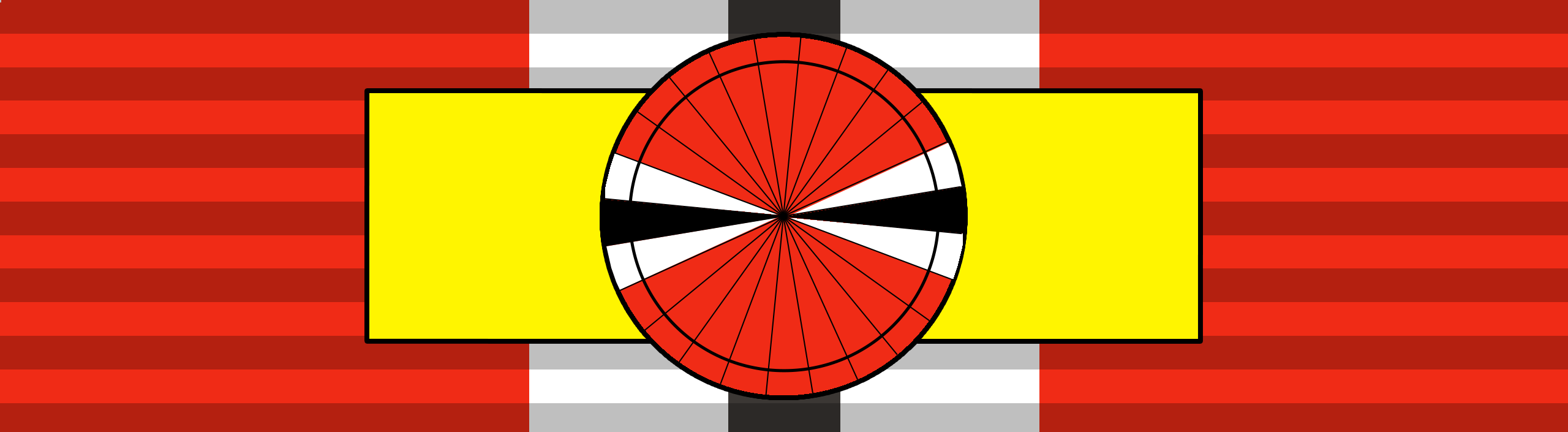

1st Row	Defense Distinguished Service Medal w/ 1 bronze oak leaf cluster	Navy Distinguished Service Medal	Defense Superior Service Medal w/ 2 oak leaf clusters	Bronze Star w/ 1 award star & Combat V
2nd Row	Purple Heart	Meritorious Service Medal w/ 1 award star	Navy and Marine Corps Commendation Medal w/ 1 award star & valor device	Navy and Marine Corps Achievement Medal w/ 1 award star
3rd Row	Combat Action Ribbon	Joint Meritorious Unit Award w/ 4 oak leaf clusters	Navy Unit Commendation w/ 1 service star	Navy Meritorious Unit Commendation w/ 3 service stars
4th Row	National Defense Service Medal w/ 1 service star	Armed Forces Expeditionary Medal w/ 1 service star	Vietnam Service Medal w/ 3 service stars	Southwest Asia Service Medal w/ 2 service stars
5th Row	Humanitarian Service Medal	Navy Sea Service Deployment Ribbon w/ 6 service stars	Navy & Marine Corps Overseas Service Ribbon w/ 1 service star	Order of Merit of the Italian Republic, Commander
6th Row	Vietnam Armed Forces Honor Medal First Class	Order of Merit (Egypt) Knight's degree	French National Order of Merit, Commander	French National Order of Merit, Officer
7th Row	Unidentified	National Reunification Medal of Yemen	The Khalifiyyeh Order of Bahrain, 1st class	Vietnam Gallantry Cross unit citation
8th Row	Vietnam Civil Actions unit citation	United Nations Medal	Vietnam Campaign Medal	Kuwait Liberation Medal (Kuwait)
Badges	Rifle Expert marksmanship badge		Pistol Expert marksmanship badge	

In addition to his U.S. military decorations, Zinni holds decorations from France, Italy, Bahrain, Egypt, Yemen, Vietnam, and Kuwait.

His civilian awards include the Papal Gold Cross of Honor, the Union League's Abraham Lincoln Award, the Italic Studies Institute's Global Peace Award, the Distinguished Sea Service Award from the Naval Order of the United States, the Eisenhower Distinguished Service Award from the Veterans of Foreign Wars, The Chapman Award from the Marine Corps University Foundation, the Penn Club Award, the St. Thomas of Villanova Alumni Medal, the George P. Shultz Award for Public Service from the U.S. Department of State, and UNICO National's Grand Patriot Award.

== Bibliography ==
- Gen. Tony Zinni (ret.) and Tony Koltz (September 2014). Before the First Shots Are Fired: How America Can Win Or Lose Off The Battlefield. Palgrave Macmillan. ISBN 978-1-137-27938-5.
- Gen. Tony Zinni (ret.) and Tony Koltz (August 2009). Leading the Charge: Leadership Lessons from the Battlefield to the Boardroom. Palgrave Macmillan. ISBN 978-0-230-61265-5.
- Gen. Tony Zinni (ret.) and Tony Koltz (foreword by Tom Clancy) (April 2006). The Battle for Peace: A Frontline Vision of America's Power and Purpose. Palgrave Macmillan. ISBN 1-4039-7174-9.
- Tom Clancy, Gen. Tony Zinni (ret.) and Tony Koltz (2004). Battle Ready. Grosset & Dunlap. ISBN 0-399-15176-1.

== See also ==
- List of United States Marine Corps four-star generals

== Notes ==
Military offices
Preceded by Binnie Peay	Combatant Commander of United States Central Command; 1997–2000	Succeeded by Tommy Franks
Diplomatic posts
Preceded by Dennis Ross	United States Special Envoy for Middle East Peace; 2001–2003	Vacant Title next held by George J. Mitchell
