= Nancy J. Lescavage =

American rear admiral

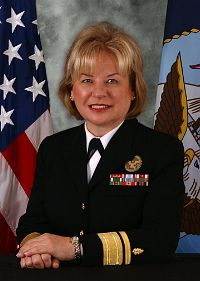
- RADM Nancy J. Lescavage, USN
- Born: June 24, 1950 (age 76); Port Carbon, Pennsylvania. U.S.
- Military career
- Allegiance: United States of America
- Branch: United States Navy
- Service years: 1972–2009
- Rank: Rear Admiral (Upper Half, O-8)
- Commands: United States Navy Nurse Corps; Naval Medical Education and Training Command, Bethesda, Maryland
- Awards: Legion of Merit (4); Defense Meritorious Service Medal

Nancy J. Lescavage is a retired American rear admiral who served as the 20th director of the Navy Nurse Corps and was the commander of Naval Medical Education and Training Command, Bethesda, Maryland.

== Early life ==
Lescavage hails from Port Carbon, Pennsylvania, and is a licensed nurse in that state.

== Navy Nurse Corps career ==
Since receiving her commission in May 1972, Rear Admiral Lescavage has held numerous senior executive leadership positions to include: Assistant Chief, Health Care Operations, Bureau of Medicine and Surgery (2001–2002); Deputy Assistant Chief for Health Care Operations, Bureau of Medicine and Surgery (1999–2001); Commanding Officer, Naval Hospital, Corpus Christi, Texas (1997–1999); Executive Officer, Naval Hospital, Great Lakes, Illinois (1995–1997); and Commanding Officer, Fleet Hospital Five (1995–1997).

Additionally, she served as a Congressional Fellow in the Office of United States Senator Daniel K. Inouye [Hawaii] (March 1993 – January 1995). Quickly recognized as an authority on the legislative process and its application to health care, she provided critical liaison with the White House and health care task forces concerning National Health Care Reform issues. From August 1989 to March 1993, as a Senior Health Facilities Planner for the Assistant Secretary of Defense (Health Affairs), Rear Adm. Lescavage was responsible for the planning and design of military medical construction projects worldwide and for performing comprehensive health care and cost-benefit analyses in support of DoD initiatives.

Prior to her Department of Defense assignments, she was in charge of the Recruit Medical Clinic at Recruit Training Command, Great Lakes, Illinois. This clinic was responsible for providing medical care to approximately 40,000 recruits annually.

Other assignments include: National Naval Medical Center Bethesda, Maryland; Naval Hospital Philadelphia; and the Navy Medical Clinic, United States Embassy, London. During these assignments, she gained expertise in the specialties of Intensive Care, Coronary Care, Operating Room, Obstetrics, Neonatology, Recovery Room, Ambulatory Care, Cardiac Surgery, Medicine and General Surgery.

Rear Adm. Nancy J. Lescavage recently served as the 20th Director of the Navy Nurse Corps and was the Commander, Naval Medical Education and Training Command, Bethesda, Maryland.

Rear Admiral Nancy J. Lescavage was assigned as the Regional Director of the TRICARE Regional Office – West, San Diego, California, overseeing Managed Care Support contracts and an integrated health care delivery system in twenty-one states covering more than 2,700,000 TRICARE eligible beneficiaries.

She retired in 2009.

== Additional career positions ==
Appointed by the Governor of Pennsylvania as the Deputy Secretary for Quality Assurance for the Pennsylvania Department of Health and additionally serves on the Pennsylvania Military Community Enhancement Commission.

== Education ==
Rear Adm. Lescavage's Diploma in Nursing is from Saint Joseph Hospital School of Nursing in Reading, Pennsylvania. She received a Baccalaureate degree in Nursing from the University of Maryland, a Graduate Degree from the University of Pennsylvania School of Nursing and a Certificate in Management from the Wharton School of Business.

== Awards ==
Rear Adm. Lescavage has had numerous articles published and has been a keynote speaker on many occasions on a variety of topics. She is the recipient of the Legion of Merit (four awards), the Defense Meritorious Service Medal, the Navy Meritorious Service Medal (two awards), the Navy and Marine Corps Commendation Medal, the Joint Service Achievement Medal, the Navy Achievement Medal, several unit commendations and the General George Joulwan Achievement Award.

She is a member of the Board of Trustees of Catholic Distance University.

== See also ==
- Navy Nurse Corps
- Women in the United States Navy

Military offices
Preceded by Kathleen L. Martin	Director, Navy Nurse Corps; 2001–2005	Succeeded by Christine Bruzek-Kohler
