= Karen Flaherty =

United States Navy Rear Admiral (born 1951)

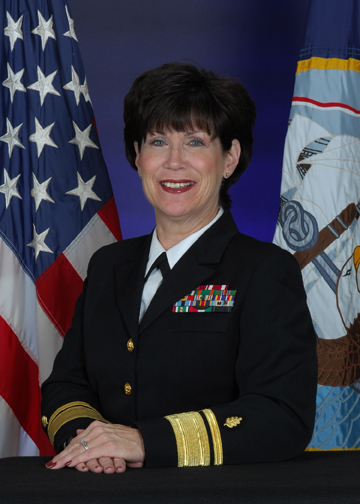
- RADM Karen Flaherty, USN
- Born: November 11, 1951 (age 74); Hartford, Connecticut
- Military career
- Allegiance: United States of America
- Branch: United States Navy
- Service years: 1974–2012
- Rank: Rear Admiral (Upper Half)
- Commands: 22nd Director of the United States Navy Nurse Corps

Rear Admiral Karen Ann Flaherty assumed duties as the Deputy Surgeon General of Navy Medicine at the Bureau of Medicine and Surgery as of August 6, 2010. Flaherty served as the 22nd Director of the United States Navy Nurse Corps as well as the Deputy Chief, Wounded, Ill, and Injured at the Bureau of Medicine and Surgery from 2009 to 2010.

== Early life ==
Flaherty is a native of Winsted, Connecticut and graduated from the Gilbert School there in 1970. She joined the United States Navy as a Nurse Corps Candidate in July 1973. She graduated from Skidmore College and attended Officer Indoctrination School at Newport, R.I., in August 1974.

== Navy Nurse Corps career ==
Flaherty's first assignment was Quantico Naval Hospital where she served as a staff nurse and charge nurse in the Surgical ward, Orthopedic ward, and the Maximum Care Unit. Upon transfer to the Philadelphia Naval Medical Center in 1977, she assumed the duties as charge nurse for the General Surgery Unit and the Obstetric and Gynecology clinic. Flaherty reported for duty as the Officer Programs Officer for Naval Recruiting Command, Navy Recruiting District New Jersey in 1979. She transitioned to the Naval Reserve in 1982.

Flaherty's subsequent reserve tours included assignments to numerous Naval Hospitals and Fleet Hospital commands. She has served as Commanding Officer Fleet Hospital Fort Dix, Executive Officer, Director of Nursing Services, Officer-in-Charge, and Training Officer. In February 1991, she was recalled to serve with Fleet Hospital 15, Al Jubail, Saudi Arabia, in support of Operation Desert Shield/Storm. She served as CO OPNAV 093 prior to assuming Flag duties as the Deputy Commander Force Integration National Capital Area and the Deputy Chief for Health Care Operations at the Bureau of Medicine and Surgery.

=== Director, Navy Nurse Corps ===
Flaherty was the 22nd Director of the Navy Nurse Corps and the Deputy Chief, Wounded, Ill, and Injured at the Bureau of Medicine and Surgery from 2009 to 2010. In August 2010, she assumed duties as the Deputy Surgeon General of Navy Medicine at the Bureau of Medicine and Surgery. She was relieved by Rear Adm. Dr. Michael H. Mittelman in November 2011 and retired from the Navy in January 2012.

== Education ==
Flaherty received her Masters of Science in Nursing Administration from the University of Pennsylvania and has held senior executive leadership positions at Thomas Jefferson University Hospital in Philadelphia, Pennsylvania, St. Francis Hospital in Wilmington, Delaware, and the Philadelphia Veterans Affairs Medical Center in Philadelphia, Pennsylvania.

== Awards ==
Flaherty is authorized to wear the Legion of Merit (two awards), Meritorious Service Medal, Navy and Marine Corps Commendation Medal (two awards), Navy and Marine Corps Achievement Medal, Meritorious Unit Citation (two awards), National Defense Service Medal (three awards), Humanitarian Service Medal, Armed Forces Reserve Medal, Navy and Marine Corps Overseas Service Ribbon, Saudi Arabia and Kuwait Liberation Medals.

== Personal ==
Flaherty is married to Steve Oxler, a physician specializing in emergency medicine. They have one daughter, Lizzy Oxler.

== See also ==
- Navy Nurse Corps
- Women in the United States Navy

Military offices
Preceded by Christine Bruzek-Kohler	Director, Navy Nurse Corps; 2009–2010	Succeeded by Elizabeth Niemeyer
