= Christine Bruzek-Kohler =

United States admiral

Christine M. Bruzek-Kohler
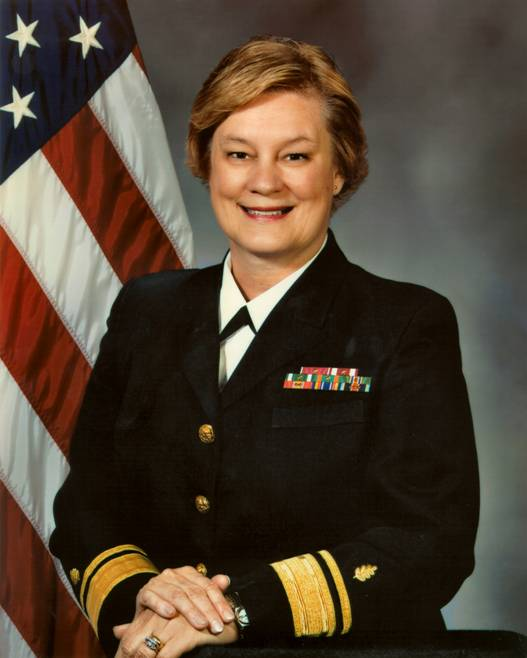
- RADM Christine M. Bruzek-Kohler, USN
- Born: February 28, 1952 (age 74); Camden, New Jersey
- Military career
- Allegiance: United States of America
- Branch: United States Navy
- Service years: 1974–2010
- Rank: Rear admiral (upper half)
- Commands: 21st director of the United States Navy Nurse Corps
- Awards: Legion of Merit (2); Meritorious Service Medal (2); Navy and Marine Corps Commendation Medal (2); Navy and Marine Corps Achievement Medal (2)

Rear Admiral Christine M. Bruzek-Kohler was the 21st director of the United States Navy Nurse Corps, and served as the commander Naval Medical Center San Diego and Navy Medicine West from May 2009 to August 2010. She officially retired from the Navy in December 2010.

== Early life ==
Bruzek-Kohler is a native of Camden, New Jersey, and attended Villanova University, where she received a Bachelor of Science in nursing and her commission as an ensign in 1974.

== Navy Nurse Corps career ==
In her distinguished career Bruzek-Kohler has served as charge nurse, National Naval Medical Center, Bethesda, Maryland; Staff Nurse, U.S. Naval Regional Medical Center, Naples, Italy; ambulatory care coordinator, Naval Hospital Newport, R.I.; director of Academic Support Department, Naval School of Health Sciences, Bethesda; head of enlisted training programs, Naval Health Sciences Education and Training Center; director of nursing and acting executive officer, Naval Hospital Great Lakes, Illinois; director of nursing, U.S. Naval Hospital, Guam; executive officer, Naval Hospital, Pensacola, Florida; commanding officer, Naval Hospital, Lemoore, California; and assistant deputy chief for medical operations support, Bureau of Medicine and Surgery, Washington, D.C.

=== Director, Navy Nurse Corps ===
Bruzek-Kohler was the 21st director of the Navy Nurse Corps and the chief of staff, Bureau of Medicine and Surgery, Washington, D.C., from 2005 to 2009. She then served as the commander Naval Medical Center San Diego and Navy Medicine West from May 2009 to August 2010.

== JTF CapMed ==
Bruzek-Kohler is currently an executive director for the Joint Task Force National Capital Region Medical.

== Education ==
Bruzek-Kohler earned a Bachelor of Science in nursing from Villanova University in 1974. She also holds a Master of Education from Providence College and a Master of Arts and Doctor of Education from George Washington University. Bruzek-Kohler is a Fellow of the American College of Healthcare Executives.

== Awards ==
Bruzek-Kohler's personal decorations include the Legion of Merit (four awards), Meritorious Service Medal (two awards), Navy and Marine Corps Commendation Medal (two awards), Navy and Marine Corps Achievement Medal (two awards), and various service awards.

- Legion of Merit with Gold Star
- Meritorious Service Medal with Gold Star
- Navy and Marine Corps Commendation Medal with Gold Star
- Navy and Marine Corps Achievement Medal with Gold Star

== See also ==
- Navy Nurse Corps
- Women in the United States Navy

== Sources ==
- Rear Admiral Christine M. Bruzek-Kohler Official U. S. Navy Biography
- Nurses and the U.S. Navy -- Overview and Special Image Selection Naval Historical Center
- Stutz, Douglas H. (2007-05-17), "Navy Nurse Corps Celebrates 99th Birthday", NAVY.mil, archived from the original on June 13, 2007

Military offices
Preceded by Nancy J. Lescavage	Director, Navy Nurse Corps; 2005–2009	Succeeded by Karen Flaherty
