= Comprehensive Health Services =

Medical management services provider

Comprehensive Health Services, Inc. (CHS) is a for-profit medical management services provider that contracts with the United States federal government. It was founded in 1975, and is now a subsidiary of Caliburn International.

== About ==
Comprehensive Health Services is located in Cape Canaveral, Florida and provides health and medical services to government agencies and commercial entities. It was founded in 1975 and is a for-profit company. In 2016, CHS expanded its services in Cape Canaveral.

CHS was awarded a government contract with the United States Customs and Border Protection (CBP) agency in 2014. The contract was worth $97 million and was for CHS to provide medical exam services. President Trump appointed John Kelly to DHS and he subsequently initiated child separation policy. Kelly is now on the board of directors that operates the Homeland Detention Center.

In 2017, CHS paid the federal government a settlement of $3.818 million in a whistleblower lawsuit for knowingly double charging and mischarging the government for medical services.
