= John F. Kelly =

Former White House Chief of Staff (born 1950)

John Kelly
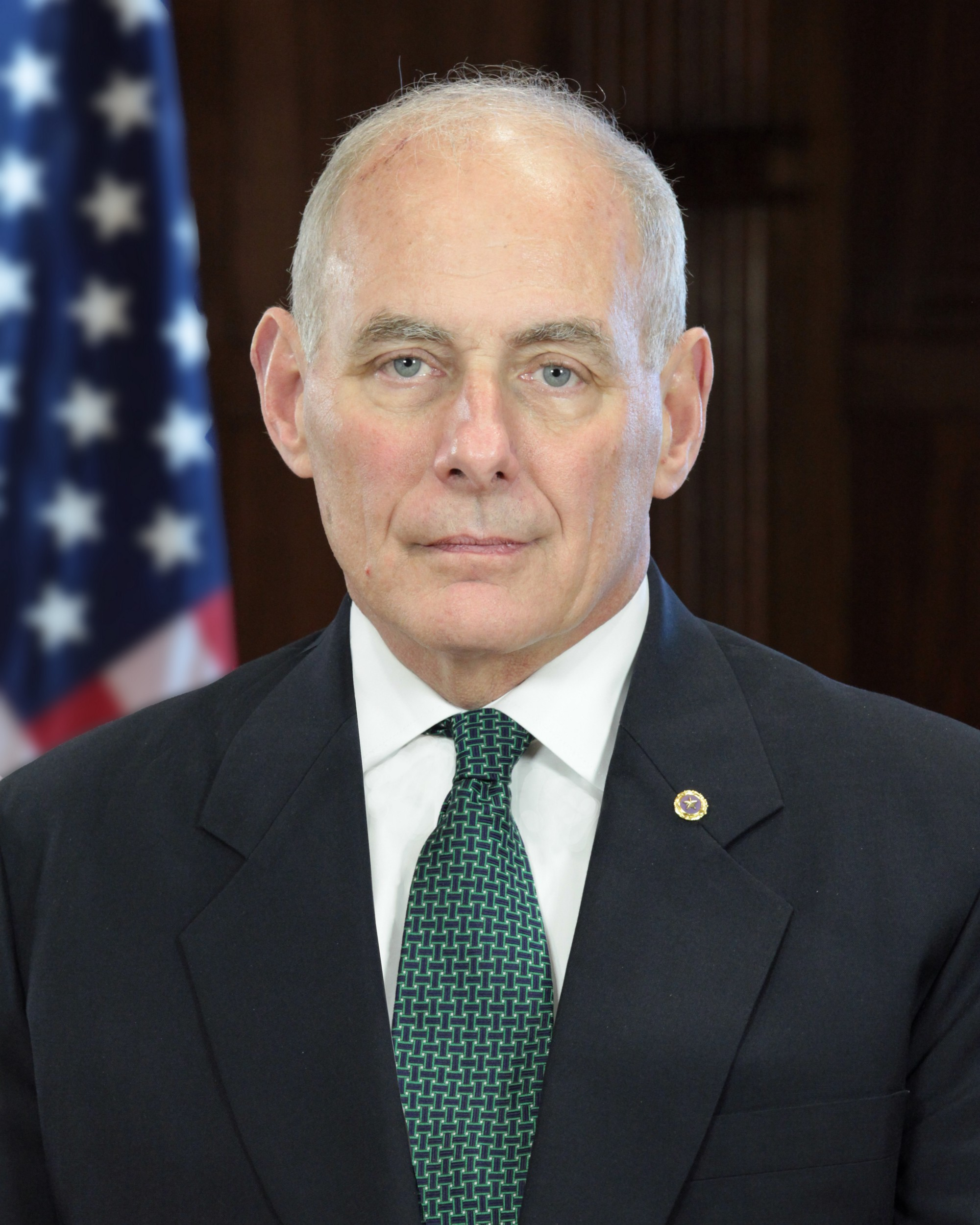
- Official portrait, 2016

28th White House Chief of Staff
- In office July 31, 2017 – January 2, 2019
- President: Donald Trump
- Principal Deputy: Kirstjen Nielsen; James W. Carroll; Zachary Fuentes
- Preceded by: Reince Priebus
- Succeeded by: Mick Mulvaney (acting)

5th United States Secretary of Homeland Security
- In office January 20, 2017 – July 31, 2017
- President: Donald Trump
- Deputy: Elaine Duke
- Preceded by: Jeh Johnson
- Succeeded by: Kirstjen Nielsen

Commander of the United States Southern Command
- In office November 19, 2012 – January 16, 2016
- President: Barack Obama
- Preceded by: Douglas M. Fraser
- Succeeded by: Kurt W. Tidd

Personal details
- Born: John Francis Kelly; May 11, 1950 (age 76) Boston, Massachusetts, U.S.
- Party: Independent
- Spouse: Karen Hernest (m. 1976)
- Children: 3
- Education: University of Massachusetts, Boston (BA); Georgetown University (MA); National Defense University (MS)

Military service
- Branch/service: United States Maritime Service; United States Marine Corps
- Years of service: 1969 (USMS); 1970–1972 (USMC); 1972–1975 (inactive reserves); 1975–2016 (USMC)
- Rank: General
- Commands: United States Southern Command; 1st Light Armored Reconnaissance Battalion; Multinational Force West
- Battles/wars: Gulf War; Operation Desert Storm; Iraq War
- Awards: Defense Distinguished Service Medal; Defense Superior Service Medal; Legion of Merit (2) with valor
- Kelly's voice Kelly on how people can prepare for hurricane season Recorded June 2, 2017

John Francis Kelly (born May 11, 1950) is an American former political advisor and retired U.S. Marine Corps general who was the White House chief of staff for President Donald Trump from 2017 until 2019. He had previously been the secretary of homeland security in the Trump administration and was commander of United States Southern Command. Kelly is a board member at Caliburn International, a professional services provider. Following his firing from the first Trump administration in December 2018, Kelly became one of Trump's most notable critics among former cabinet members and administration officials, alleging in The Atlantic that Trump would often praise authoritarian regimes in private meetings. In October 2024, Kelly described Trump as "fascist" prior to the 2024 presidential election.

Born in Boston, Massachusetts, Kelly enlisted in the Marine Corps during the Vietnam War and was commissioned as an officer near the end of college. He rose through the ranks, eventually serving in his last military post from 2012 to 2016 as a four-star general leading United States Southern Command, the unified combatant command responsible for American military operations in Central America, South America, and the Caribbean.

Before joining the Trump administration in January 2017, Kelly had been on the board of advisors of DC Capital Partners, an investment firm that owns Caliburn International. Kelly was selected as the Trump administration's first Secretary of Homeland Security. Kelly earned a reputation for being an aggressive enforcer of immigration law. After six months, he was selected to replace Reince Priebus as White House chief of staff in an attempt to bring more stability to the White House. He was the first career military officer to serve in the position since Alexander Haig during the Nixon and Ford administrations.

== Early life and education ==
Kelly was born on May 11, 1950, in Boston, Massachusetts, the son of Josephine "Honey" (Pedalino) and John F. Kelly. Born to a Catholic family, his father was of Irish ancestry and his mother of Italian descent. His father was a postal worker in Brighton. He grew up in the Brighton neighborhood of Boston. Before the age of 16, he hitchhiked to Washington state and rode the trains back, including a freight-hop from Seattle to Chicago. He then served for one year in the United States Merchant Marine, where he says "my first time overseas was taking 10,000 tons of beer to Vietnam".

In 1970, when his mother told him that his draft number was coming up, he enlisted in the U.S. Marine Corps. He served in an infantry company with the 2nd Marine Division at Camp Lejeune, North Carolina, and was discharged to the inactive reserve as a sergeant in 1972 so that he could attend college. He returned to active duty with the Marines in 1975, completed Officer Candidates School, and was commissioned as a second lieutenant on December 27, 1975. In 1976, he graduated from the University of Massachusetts Boston and in 1984, he received a Master of Arts degree in National Security Affairs from the Georgetown School of Foreign Service. In 1995, Kelly graduated from the National Defense University in Washington, D.C., with a Master of Science in strategic studies.

== Military career ==
Kelly returned to the Second Marine Division where he served as a rifle platoon and weapons platoon commander, company executive officer, assistant operations officer, and rifle company commander. Sea duty in Mayport, Florida, followed, at which time he served aboard aircraft carriers USS Forrestal (CV-59) and USS Independence (CV-62). In 1980, then-Captain Kelly attended the U.S. Army's Infantry Officer Advanced Course at Fort Benning, Georgia. After graduation, he was assigned to Headquarters Marine Corps in Washington, D.C., serving there from 1981 through 1984, as an assignment monitor. Kelly returned to the Second Marine Division in 1984, to command a rifle company and weapons company. Promoted to major in 1987, he then served as a battalion operations officer.

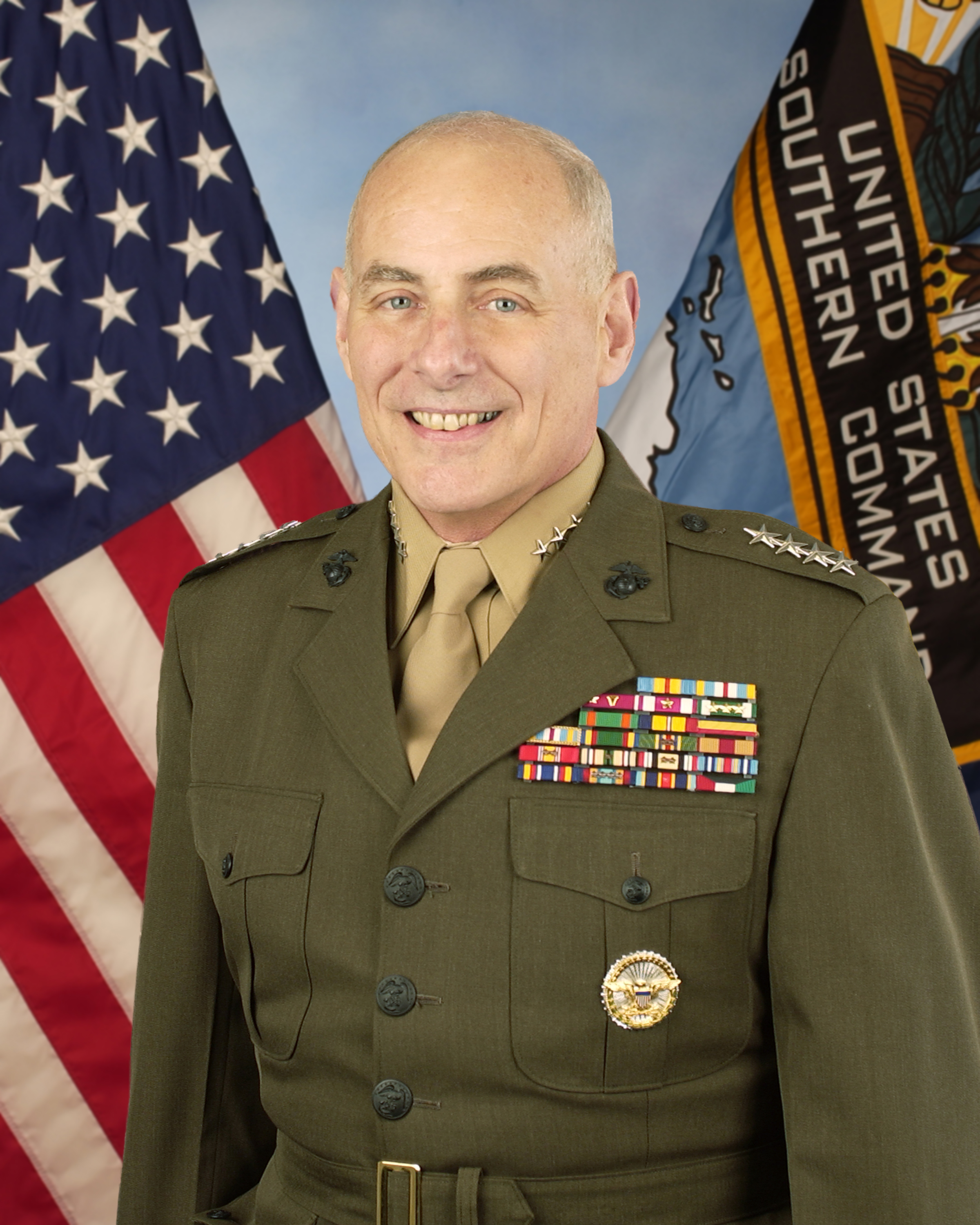
Kelly's official U.S. Southern Command portrait

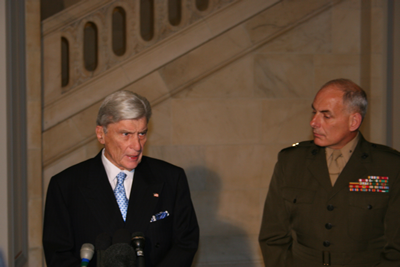
Kelly and U.S. Senator John Warner hold a briefing regarding the status of investigations into the Haditha incident on May 25, 2006.

In 1987, Kelly transferred to the Basic School in Quantico, Virginia, serving first as the head of the Offensive Tactics Section, Tactics Group, and later assuming the duties of the director of the Infantry Officer Course. After three years of instructing young officers, he attended the Marine Corps Command and Staff College, and the School for Advanced Warfare, both located at Quantico.

Completing duty under instruction and selected for lieutenant colonel, he was assigned as commanding officer, 1st Light Armored Reconnaissance Battalion (1st LAR), 1st Marine Division, Camp Pendleton, California. During his tenure, 1st LAR was called in to provide augmentation support for police in the city of Long Beach, California during the Los Angeles riots of 1992. Holding this command position for two years, Kelly returned to the East Coast in 1994, to attend the National War College in Washington, D.C. He graduated in 1995 and was selected to serve as the commandant's liaison officer to the U.S. House of Representatives, Capitol Hill, where he was promoted to colonel.

In 1999, Kelly transferred to joint duty and served as the special assistant to the supreme allied commander, Europe, in Mons, Belgium. He returned to the United States in 2001 and was assigned to a third tour of duty at Camp Lejeune, now as the assistant chief of staff G-3 with the Second Marine Division. In 2002, Kelly again served with the 1st Marine Division, this time as the assistant division commander. Much of Kelly's two-year assignment was spent deployed in Iraq. In March 2003, while in Iraq, Kelly was promoted to brigadier general, which was the first known promotion of a Marine Corps colonel in an active combat zone since that of another First Marine Division assistant division commander, Chesty Puller, in January 1951.

In April 2003, Kelly took command of the newly formed Task Force Tripoli and drove it north from Baghdad into Samarra and Tikrit. Kelly has stated that during the initial assault on Baghdad he was asked by a reporter for The Los Angeles Times if, considering the size of the Iraqi Army and the vast supplies of tanks, artillery and chemical weapons available to Saddam's forces, he would ever consider defeat. Kelly's response, as recounted by him at a 2007 San Diego Military Advisory Council networking breakfast, was, "hell these are Marines. Men like them held Guadalcanal and took Iwo Jima, Baghdad ain't shit."

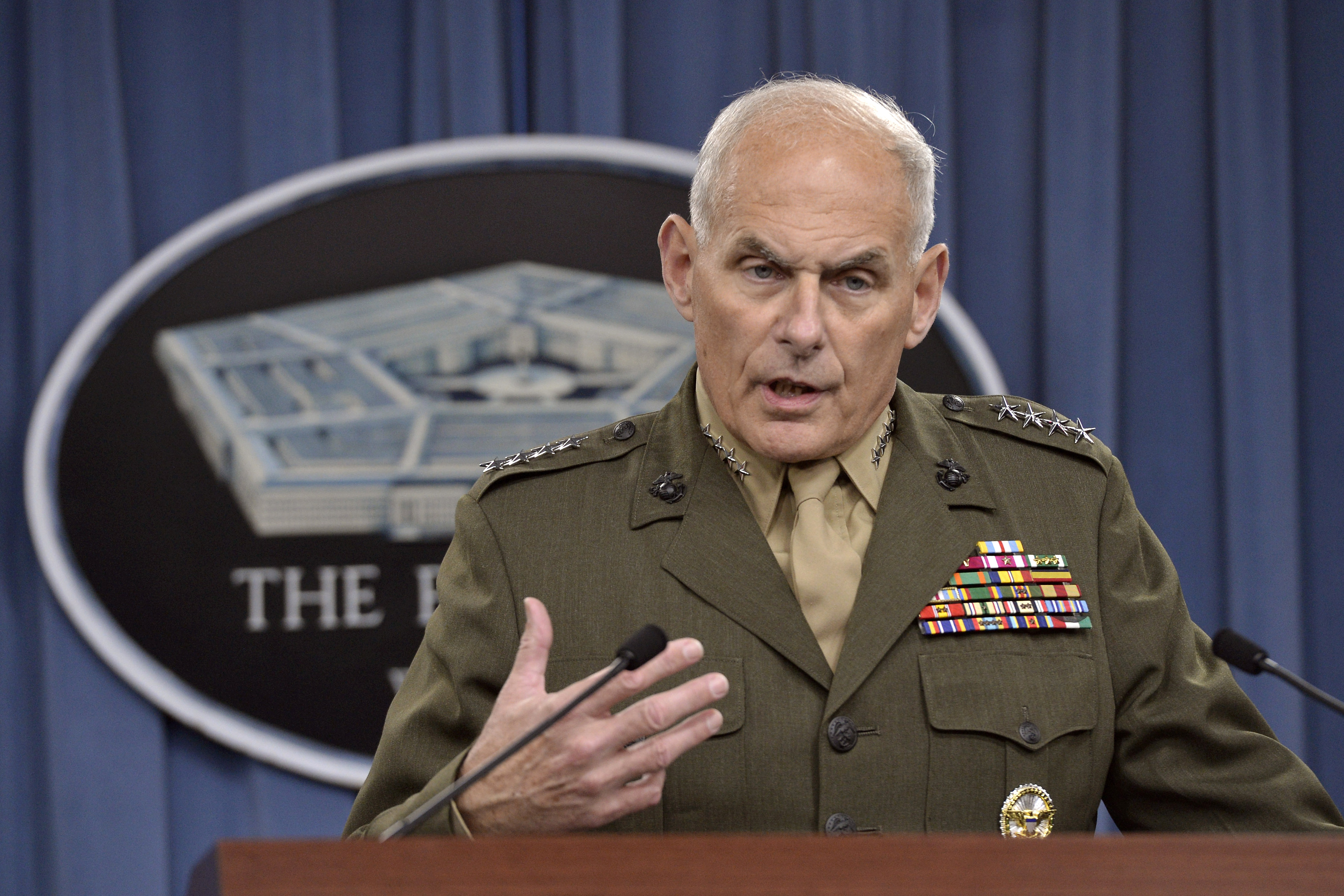
Kelly briefing reporters at the Pentagon in Arlington, Virginia

His next assignment was as legislative assistant to the commandant of the Marine Corps, Michael Hagee. In January 2007, Kelly was nominated for major general, and confirmed by the U.S. Senate on September 11, 2007.

Kelly's next assignment, in July 2007, was as commanding general, I Marine Expeditionary Force (Forward). On February 9, 2008, Kelly assumed command of the Multi-National Force–West in Iraq, replacing Major General Walter E. Gaskin. After a year in Iraq, Kelly returned to the United States in February 2009.

Kelly was nominated for lieutenant general on March 9, 2011, and confirmed by the U.S. Senate on March 16, 2011.

Kelly was the senior military assistant to the secretary of defense and personally greeted Secretary Leon Panetta at the entrance to the Pentagon on July 1, 2011, Panetta's first day as secretary. Kelly was nominated for General on January 31, 2012, and confirmed by the U.S. Senate on July 26, 2012. He succeeded General Douglas M. Fraser as commander of U.S. Southern Command on November 19, 2012.

In a May 2014 speech regarding the war on terror, Kelly said:

If you think this war against our way of life is over because some of the self-appointed opinion-makers and chattering class grow 'war weary,' because they want to be out of Iraq or Afghanistan, you are mistaken. This enemy is dedicated to our destruction. He will fight us for generations, and the conflict will move through various phases as it has since 9/11.

Kelly was succeeded as commander by Navy admiral Kurt W. Tidd on January 14, 2016.

== Secretary of Homeland Security ==
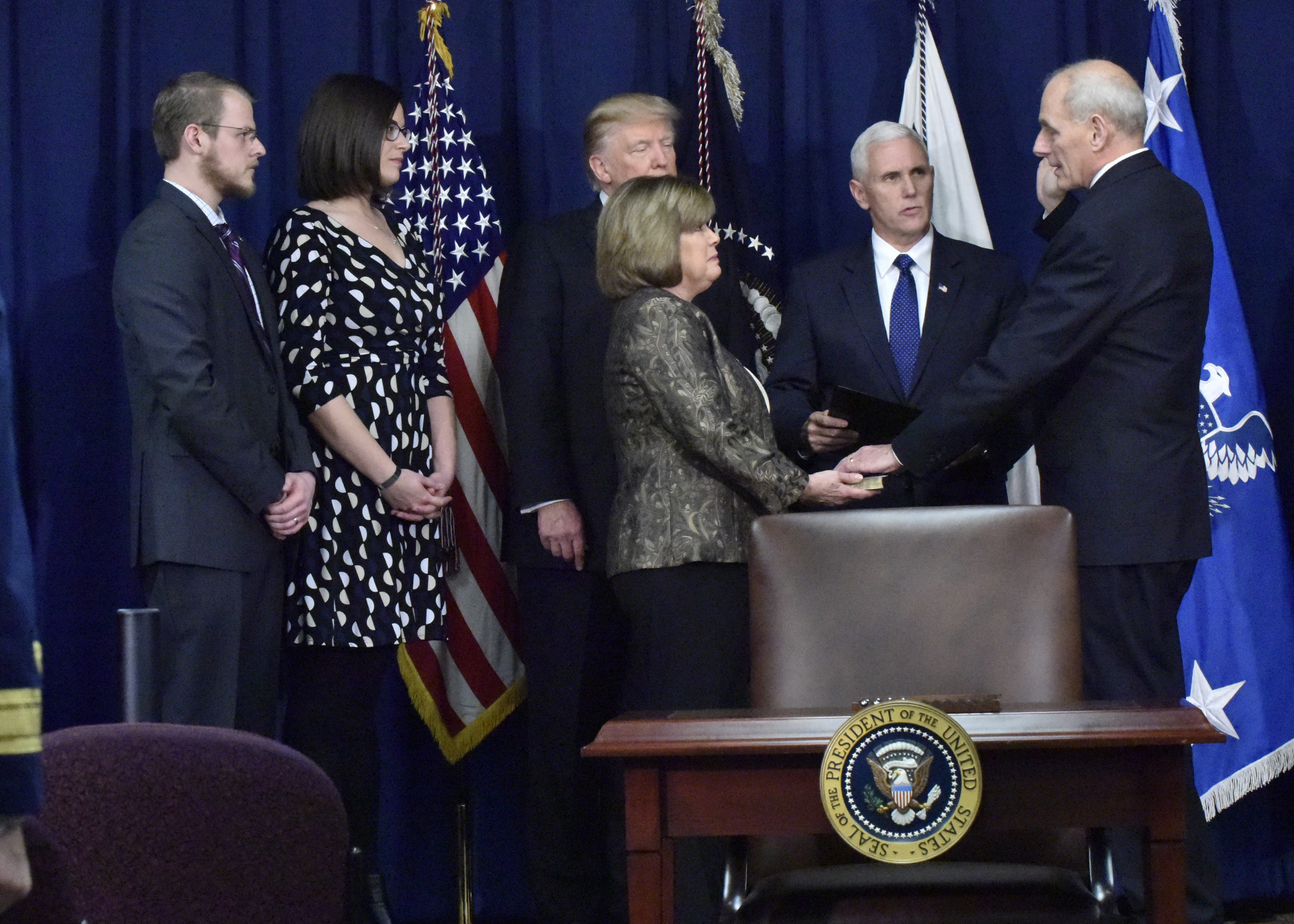
Kelly is ceremonially sworn in prior to President Trump's speech at DHS Headquarters on January 25, 2017. Kelly was actually sworn in five days prior.

On December 7, 2016, then President-elect Donald Trump nominated Kelly to head the Department of Homeland Security (DHS), a cabinet-level position. People familiar with the transition said that Trump's team was drawn to Kelly because of his southwest border expertise. On January 20, 2017, Kelly was confirmed as Secretary of Homeland Security by the United States Senate with a vote of 88–11. On that evening, he was sworn in by Vice President Mike Pence.

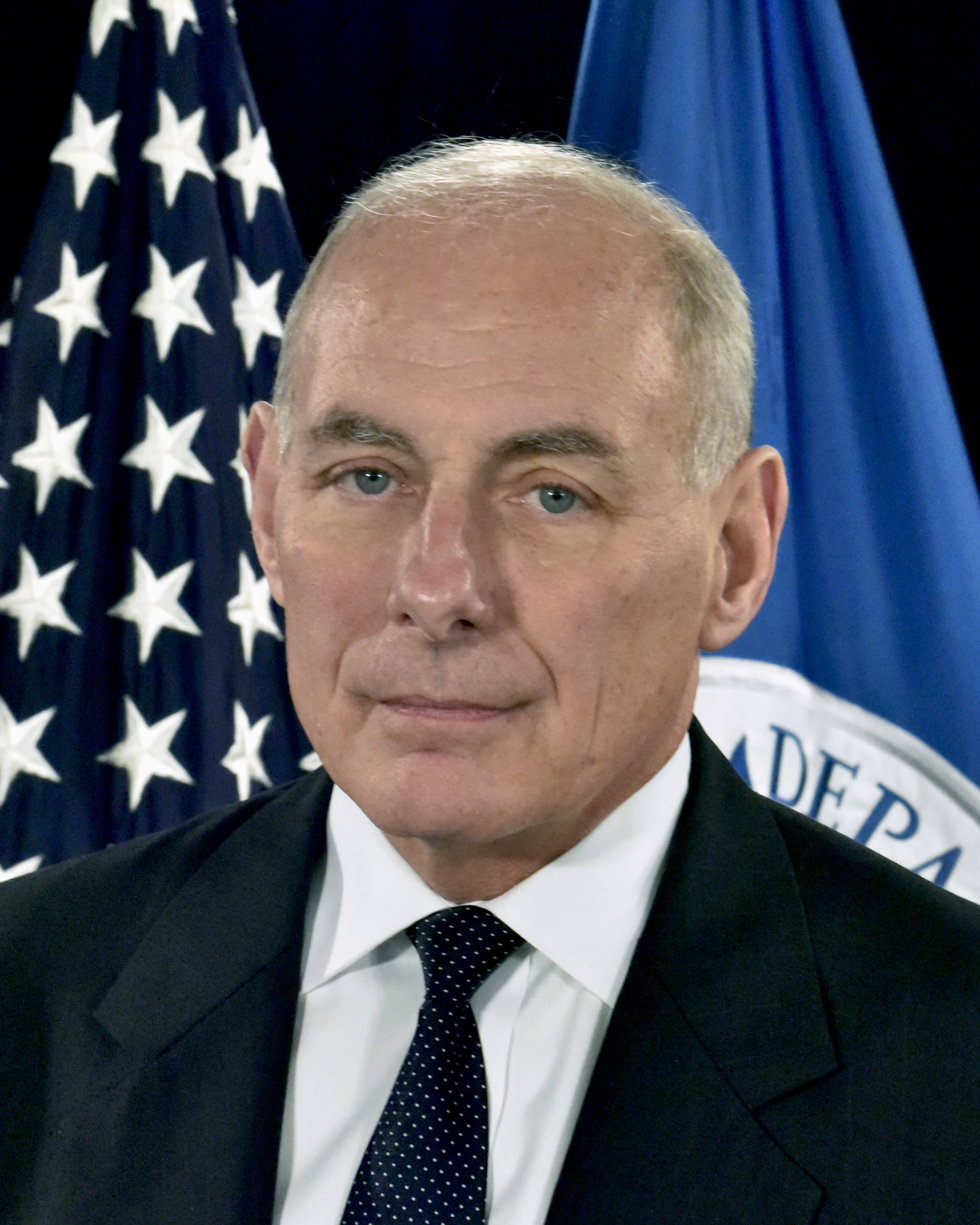
Kelly's official portrait as Secretary of Homeland Security, 2017

In an April 2017 speech at George Washington University, Kelly said, "If lawmakers do not like the laws they've passed and we are charged to enforce, then they should have the courage and skill to change the laws. Otherwise they should shut up and support the men and women on the front lines."

Kelly indicated days into the administration his interest in having the U.S.–Mexico border wall completed within two years. On April 21, 2017, Kelly said the U.S.–Mexico border wall would begin construction "by the end of the summer." Two days later, Kelly said he believed "a border wall is essential" as there were "tremendous threats" such as drugs and individuals coming into the US. On May 2, Kelly stated his surprise in office holders "rejoicing in the fact that the wall will be slower to be built and, consequently, the southwest border under less control than it could be."

In May 2017, Kelly said of terrorism, "It's everywhere. It's constant. It's nonstop. The good news for us in America is we have amazing people protecting us every day. But it can happen here almost anytime." He said that the threat from terrorism was so severe that some people would "never leave the house" if they knew the truth. In July, Kelly allegedly blocked Milwaukee County Sheriff David Clarke from taking a position in the DHS, though it was never confirmed.

=== Assessment of tenure ===
Of his tenure as Secretary of Homeland Security, USA Today wrote, "Kelly oversaw some of the most controversial policies of Trump's agenda, including a travel ban targeting several majority-Muslim countries, a reduction in refugee admissions and stepped-up deportations of undocumented immigrants." According to the New Yorker, Kelly left the DHS with a:

...reputation as one of the most aggressive enforcers of immigration law in recent American history. His record belies the short length of his tenure. In six months, Kelly eliminated guidelines that governed federal immigration agents' work; vastly expanded the categories of immigrants being targeted for deportation; threatened to abandon the Obama-era program that grants legal status to undocumented immigrants who were brought to the U.S. as children; and has even broached the idea of splitting up mothers and children at the border to "deter" people from coming to the U.S.

The DHS under Kelly "became one of the few branches of the federal government that has been both willing and able to execute Trump's policy priorities." Unlike other agency heads, Kelly did not clash with Trump.

== White House chief of staff ==
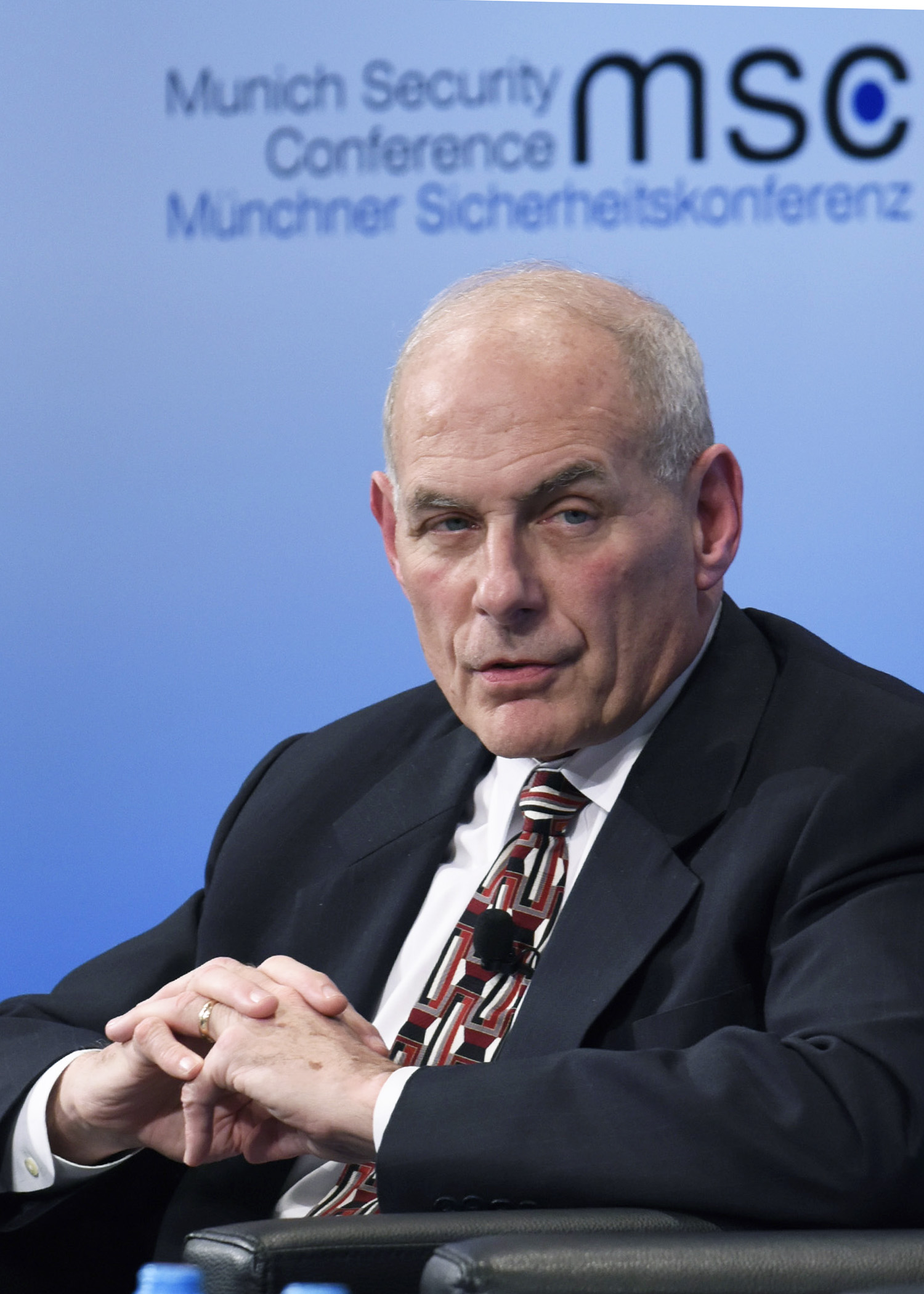
Kelly during the MSC 2017

Kelly with President Donald Trump in the Oval Office, July 2017

Trump appointed Kelly to the post of White House chief of staff on July 28, 2017, replacing Reince Priebus. Priebus's ousting and Kelly's appointment followed an internal power struggle within the White House. Kelly took office on July 31, 2017. That same day, with Trump's approval, Kelly removed Anthony Scaramucci from his role as White House communications director just ten days after Scaramucci was appointed to that role. Reportedly, Kelly had requested permission to remove Scaramucci after "Scaramucci had boasted about reporting directly to the president, not the chief of staff." On August 18, 2017, Kelly removed Steve Bannon from his role as White House chief strategist on behalf of President Trump. In September 2017, Kelly folded the Office of Trade and Manufacturing Policy, which was led by Peter Navarro, into the National Economic Council, which meant that Navarro would report to NEC director Gary Cohn.

Early into his tenure, media outlets such as The New York Times, The Washington Post, and FiveThirtyEight speculated that Kelly would bring moderation and discipline to the White House. In August 2017, early into Kelly's tenure, The Washington Post wrote that Kelly had "left no discernible imprint on the White House's philosophy" and that it was unclear if he would bring calm and rigor to the White House. In a lengthy October 2017 article on Kelly's tenure, Peter Baker, of The New York Times, wrote that "for all of the talk of Mr. Kelly as a moderating force and the so-called grown-up in the room, it turns out that he harbors strong feelings on patriotism, national security and immigration that mirror the hard-line views of his outspoken boss." By February 2018, Kelly had emerged as a hardliner on several issues, particularly on immigration. He supported the administration's policy of separating children from their parents as a means of deterring illegal immigration, and he rejected the idea that family separation was inhumane, telling an NPR reporter, "The children will be taken care of — put into foster care or whatever." He was also embroiled in controversy after defending an aide who was accused of domestic violence, and there were reports of pressure on Kelly to resign.

When Trump arrived in Singapore in June 2018 for the North Korea–United States summit, The New York Times reported that Kelly had told a recent group of visiting American senators that the White House was "a miserable place to work." The reported comment renewed months-long speculation that Kelly would resign from his job as White House chief of staff.

According to several news outlets in early 2018, Kelly's influence in the White House had been diminished and Trump made several key decisions without his presence. On December 7, 2018, CNN and others reported that Kelly and Trump were no longer on speaking terms and that Kelly was expected to resign in the coming days. On December 8, Trump announced that Kelly would be leaving at the end of the year. On December 14, 2018, the White House announced that Mick Mulvaney would replace John Kelly as the White House chief of staff.

On the day after the 2021 United States Capitol attack, Kelly said he supported Trump's removal from office by use of the Twenty-fifth Amendment to the United States Constitution, adding, "What happened on Capitol Hill yesterday is a direct result of his poisoning the minds of people with the lies and the frauds."

Kelly released a statement in October 2023 confirming much of the 2020 reporting by Jeffrey Goldberg that Trump had expressed disdain for veterans and American servicemembers killed in action. Kelly harshly condemned Trump in several respects, characterizing him as "a person that has nothing but contempt for our democratic institutions, our Constitution, and the rule of law."

In an October 2024 interview with Michael S. Schmidt of The New York Times, Kelly again remarked on Trump's recent comments about using the military against the "enemy within" the United States. Kelly said Trump met the definition of a fascist, would govern like a dictator if allowed, and had no understanding of the Constitution or the concept of rule of law. He confirmed previous reports that Trump had made admiring statements about Adolf Hitler and had expressed contempt for disabled veterans and those who had died. He said Trump wrongly believed that the uniformed and retired senior generals he brought in to work for him would be loyal to him above all else, including the Constitution.

== Controversies ==
=== DC Capital Partners conflict of interest ===
In January 2017, The Intercept reported that Kelly failed to disclose his position as vice-chair on the Spectrum Group, a defense contractor lobbying firm, on his ethics form, while taking a position at the Department of Homeland Security. In 2019, Kelly's appointment to the board of Caliburn International, a subsidiary of DC Capital Partners that operates for-profit detention facilities for migrant children at the Southern Border and in Florida, raised conflict of interest concerns. Some members of Congress have described "prison-like" living conditions in the company's facility in Homestead. Caliburn CEO James Van Dusen said, "With four decades of military and humanitarian leadership, in-depth understanding of international affairs and knowledge of current economic drivers around the world, General Kelly is a strong strategic addition to our team." Candidates in the 2020 Democratic Party presidential primaries objected, including Cory Booker, who said Kelly's actions in joining the board were "disgusting," and Elizabeth Warren, who called his role, "corruption at its absolute worst." In July 2019, the House Oversight Committee announced it was probing Kelly's conflict of interest in the camps while he was the White House Chief of Staff.

=== Frederica Wilson dispute ===
In October 2017, Congresswoman Frederica Wilson (D-FL) criticized Trump for his phone call to the widow of a slain U.S. soldier, saying his remarks had been insensitive. Wilson had been in the widow's car when Trump had called her. A few days later, Kelly held a press briefing where he defended Trump's phone call, which he had overheard, saying Trump "expressed his condolences in the best way that he could." Kelly harshly criticized Wilson, calling her "the empty barrel that makes the most noise" and stating that in a 2015 speech Wilson had "stood up" to inappropriately claim credit for securing federal funding for an FBI building in her district. The South Florida Sun-Sentinel found video of her 2015 speech which showed his description to be inaccurate. PolitiFact published an article fact-checking Kelly's comments, which were ruled "false"; the article stated that Kelly had "mischaracterized her remarks in significant ways". Later that month, while in an interview with conservative commentator Laura Ingraham, Kelly said he stood by his comments on Wilson and would never apologize for his comments. Kelly said he would "talk about before her comments and at the reception afterwards" as a "package deal", but refused to elaborate further.

=== Civil War remarks ===
In the same October 2017 interview with Laura Ingraham, Kelly said that "the lack of ability to compromise led to the Civil War." He also described Robert E. Lee as an "honorable man" who "gave up ... his country to fight for his state," and claimed, "men and women of good faith on both sides made their stand where their conscience had to make their stand." Several historians of the Civil War described Kelly's remarks as ignorant, and as a misuse of history reminiscent of Lost Cause mythology. They also broadly reject Kelly's remark that a failure to compromise led to the Civil War, noting that the war was predominantly fought over slavery and that a number of compromises on slavery were made in the lead-up to the war. The White House defended Kelly's remarks, citing non-fiction writer and historian Shelby Foote.

=== DACA remarks ===
On February 6, 2018, Kelly made recorded remarks concerning a discrepancy between how many had enrolled in DACA (Deferred Action for Childhood Arrivals) and how many were to be offered a path to citizenship, by saying "The difference between 690 [thousand] and 1.8 million were the people that some would say were too afraid to sign up; others would say are too lazy to get off their asses, but they didn't sign up".

=== Confrontation with Corey Lewandowski ===
In February 2018, The New York Times reported that Kelly had been in a physical confrontation with former Trump campaign manager Corey Lewandowski. According to anonymous sources, Kelly had a heated argument with Lewandowski in which he accused him of profiting off Trump's presidency. This led to Kelly grabbing Lewandowski by the collar and pushing him up against the wall just outside the Oval Office. The sources said Lewandowski did not respond physically to Kelly, and when Secret Service agents arrived, Lewandowski and Kelly went their separate ways.

=== Firing of White House aide Rob Porter ===
On February 7, 2018, White House staff secretary Rob Porter resigned in the wake of reports that his two ex-wives accused him of domestic abuse, allegations that Porter said are false and "a coordinated smear campaign". One ex-wife had a protective order from 2010 against Porter, and the other had photographic evidence of the alleged abuse. The protective order had prevented Porter from obtaining a full security clearance, though the order's associated ex-wife said Porter's "integrity and ability to do his job is impeccable". According to an unnamed senior administration official, Kelly was aware of the protective order and the domestic abuse allegations, and had promoted Porter within the White House. Approached by media about the allegations, Kelly initially praised Porter, saying he was a "man of true integrity and honor, and I can't say enough good things about him. He is a friend, a confidante and a trusted professional. I am proud to serve alongside him." Per an unnamed White House official, Porter resigned over the objections of Kelly, who had worked closely with Porter since becoming White House Chief of Staff.

In a February 8 email to White House staff, Kelly wrote, "While we are all processing the shocking and troubling allegations made against a former White House staffer, I want you to know that we all take matters of domestic violence very seriously. Domestic violence is abhorrent and has no place in our society". On February 9, 2018, The Washington Post reported that Kelly had instructed senior staff and aides to tell reporters that Kelly took immediate action to fire Porter upon hearing that domestic abuse allegations were credible; the Post noted this "version of events contradicts both the public record and accounts from numerous other White House officials in recent days as the Porter drama unfolded." Kelly told reporters on March 2, 2018 that he sought Porter's resignation immediately after learning of the accusations on February 6 and regretted his handling of Porter's departure.

=== Firing of Omarosa Manigault ===
In August 2018, a tape was released of Kelly firing White House staffer Omarosa Manigault in the Situation Room, and allegedly threatening her legally as well as reputationally, saying to her: "I'd like to see this be a friendly departure. There are pretty significant legal issues that we hope don't develop into something that, that'll make it ugly for you." When questioned whether the President knew of the firing, Kelly replied: "The [White House] staff, and everybody on the staff, works for me and not the president." Kelly's use of the Situation Room to isolate and fire Manigault also led to controversy about potential misuse of the high-security facility by Kelly, as well as the fact he was unknowingly recorded within it.

=== Donald Trump's comments on Adolf Hitler ===
According to New York Times reporter Michael C. Bender in his 2021 book 'Frankly, We Did Win This Election': The Inside Story of How Trump Lost, during a 2018 trip to France to commemorate the 100th anniversary of the end of World War I, then President Donald Trump told Kelly, "Well, Hitler did a lot of good things", specifically pointing to the recovery of Germany’s economy in the 1930s. The story was first reported on July 6, 2021. The next day, Trump's spokesperson denied that the former president praised Hitler, calling the claim "totally false". Kelly also recalled Trump saying that "I need the kind of generals that Hitler had" during a meeting in the White House, and insisted that they were "totally loyal to him" after Kelly pointed out they had tried to kill him multiple times.

== Personal life ==
Kelly married Karen Hernest in 1976. They raised three children together: Robert, John Jr., and Kathleen.

On November 9, 2010, Kelly's 29-year-old son, First Lieutenant Robert Michael Kelly, was killed in action when he stepped on a land mine while leading a platoon of Marines on a patrol in Sangin, Afghanistan.

The younger Kelly was a former enlisted Marine and was on his third combat tour, his first combat tour as a U.S. Marine Corps infantry officer. At the time of his death, Robert Kelly was with Lima Company, 3rd Battalion, 5th Marines. Robert Kelly's death made John Kelly the highest-ranking American military officer to lose a child in Iraq or Afghanistan. Kelly's other son is a Marine Corps Lieutenant Colonel.

== Military awards ==
Kelly's military decorations and awards:

Defense Distinguished Service Medal
Defense Superior Service Medal	Legion of Merit w/ Gold Star and Combat "V"	Meritorious Service Medal w/ Gold Star	Navy and Marine Corps Commendation Medal w/ 3 Gold Stars
Navy and Marine Corps Achievement Medal	Combat Action Ribbon	Navy Presidential Unit Citation	Joint Meritorious Unit Award w/ Oak Leaf Cluster
Navy Unit Commendation	Navy Meritorious Unit Commendation w/ 2 Bronze Stars	Marine Corps Expeditionary Medal	National Defense Service Medal w/ 2 Bronze Stars
Southwest Asia Service Medal w/ Bronze Star	Iraq Campaign Medal w/ 3 Bronze Stars	Global War on Terrorism Expeditionary Medal	Global War on Terrorism Service Medal
Navy Sea Service Deployment Ribbon w/ 4 Bronze Stars	Navy and Marine Corps Overseas Service Ribbon	Grand Officer of the Order of San Carlos (Colombia)	Kuwait Liberation Medal (Kuwait)
Office of the Secretary of Defense Identification Badge

== See also ==
- List of people who have held multiple United States Cabinet-level positions

Military offices
Preceded by Walter Gaskin	Commander of Multi-National Force West; 2008–2009	Succeeded by Richard T. Tryon
Preceded by Jack Bergman	Commander of the United States Marine Corps Reserve; 2009–2011	Succeeded by Darrell Moore; Acting
Preceded by Jack Bergman	Commander of the United States Marine Corps Forces Northern Command; 2009–2011	Succeeded by Darrell Moore; Acting
Preceded by Joseph D. Kernan	Senior Military Assistant to the Secretary of Defense; 2011–2012	Succeeded by Thomas D. Waldhauser
Preceded by Douglas Fraser	Commander of United States Southern Command; 2012–2016	Succeeded by Kurt Tidd
Political offices
Preceded by Jeh Johnson	5th United States Secretary of Homeland Security; 2017	Succeeded by Kirstjen Nielsen
Preceded by Reince Priebus	28th White House Chief of Staff; 2017–2019	Succeeded by Mick Mulvaney; Acting
U.S. order of precedence (ceremonial)
Preceded by Jim Mattis as Former U.S. Cabinet Member	Order of precedence of the United States as Former U.S. Cabinet Member	Succeeded by Betsy DeVos as Former U.S. Cabinet Member
