= Acuity International =

Private contractor to the U.S. government

- Founded: 2018
- Headquarters: Reston, Virginia, U.S.
- Key people: Thomas J. Campbell, Chairman; Tony Corbi, CEO
- Owner: DC Capital Partners
- Number of employees: 2,800 (February 2024)
- Subsidiaries: Comprehensive Health Services; Sallyport Global
- Website: acuityinternational.com

Acuity International, formerly Caliburn International LLC, is a professional services provider headquartered in Reston, Virginia, with about 2,800 employees. They offer occupational health, disaster response and recovery, global health services, program and construction management, munitions response and demilitarization services, global security services, and base and critical facilities management. They serve the U.S. government and commercial clients worldwide, including the Department of Defense and Department of State.

== Company ==
The company was formed by DC Capital Partners and is currently managed by Tony Corbi, former chief financial officer and chief operations officer of Owl Cyber Defense. The board includes Generals John F. Kelly, Anthony Zinni, Michael Hayden, and admirals Stephen F. Loftus, and Kathleen Martin. Retired Admiral James G. Stavridis previously served on the board and resigned in September 2019.

== Stock market ==
In October 2018, the company announced plans to sell $100 million shares public stocks in an initial public offering, promising significant growth related to Trump's immigration and border policies, while warning potential investors of risks related to the "politically charged environment". Caliburn withdrew its registration statement for the offering in March 2019 following negative press and scrutiny. The prospectus included an annual payment of at least $100,000 for board members and $200,000 bonus if the company went public.

== Criticisms ==
Caliburn has received scrutiny for operations by subsidiary companies Sallyport Global and Comprehensive Health Services The company is being investigated for alleged bribery of Iraqi officials for exclusive contracts. As of May 2019, the non-partisan watchdog group Citizens for Responsibility and Ethics in Washington requested documentation regarding Kelly's involvement with Trump's child separation policy and his then-current role at Caliburn. Comprehensive Health Services also operated at Balad Air Base during the time that Sallyport Global is accused of worker mistreatment and neglect.
